= Dev Hynes discography =

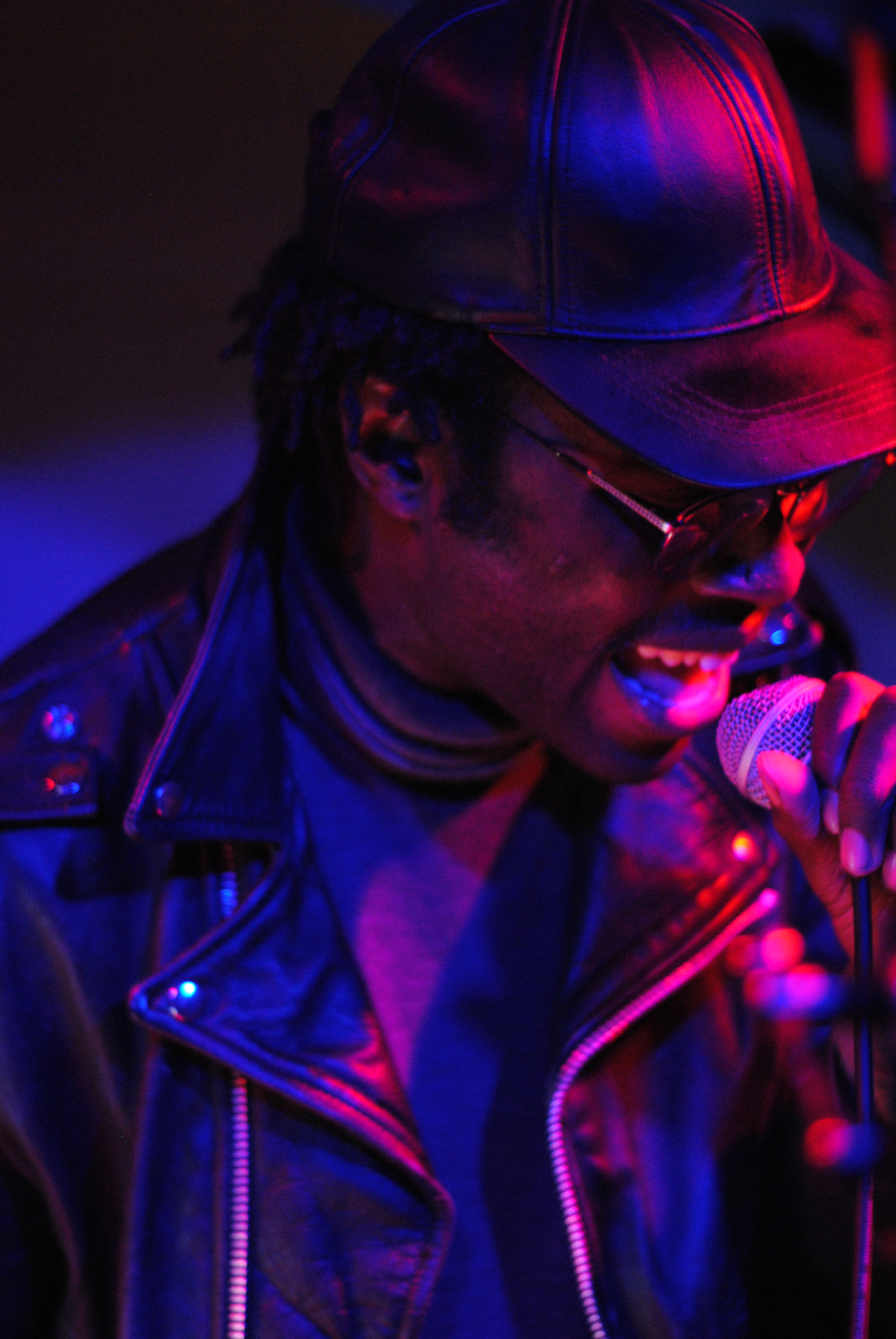
Hynes performing as Blood Orange in 2011

The discography of English singer, composer, songwriter, producer and author Dev Hynes consists of work with groups like Test Icicles and solo work produced under the aliases Lightspeed Champion and Blood Orange. This list is also comprehensive of productions credited to his given name, Devonté Hynes.

== Test Icicles (with Rory Attwell, Sam Mehran) ==
=== Studio albums ===
| Title | Details | Peak chart positions | | |
| Title | Details | UK | UK Indie | SCO |
|---|---|---|---|---|
| For Screening Purposes Only | Released: 31 October 2005; Label: Domino; Formats: CD, LP, digital download | 69 | 4 | 66 |

=== Extended plays ===
| Title | Details | Peak chart positions |
| Title | Details | UK Indie |
|---|---|---|
| What's Michelle Like? | Released: 1 August 2004; Label: Self-released; Formats: CDr | — |
| Boa vs. Python | Released: 1 November 2005; Label: Domino; Formats: CD, LP | — |
| Dig Your Own Grave | Released: 24 April 2006; Label: Domino; Formats: CD, LP, digital download | 25 |
"—" denotes a recording that did not chart or was not released in that territory.

=== Singles ===
| Title | Year | Peak chart positions | | | | Album |
| Title | Year | UK | UK Indie | UK Rock | SCO | Album |
|---|---|---|---|---|---|---|
| "Boa vs. Python" | 2005 | 46 | 5 | 2 | 41 | For Screening Purposes Only |
| "Circle. Square. Triangle" | 2005 | 25 | 3 | — | 24 | For Screening Purposes Only |
| "What's Your Damage" | 2006 | 31 | 6 | — | 22 | For Screening Purposes Only |
| "Totally Re-Fucked" | 2006 | 133 | 13 | 4 | 84 | Non-album single |
"—" denotes a recording that did not chart or was not released in that territory.

== Lightspeed Champion ==
Lightspeed Champion discography
- Studio albums: 2
- EPs: 3
- Singles: 9
- Mixtapes: 7

=== Studio albums ===
| Title | Details | Peak chart positions | | | | |
| Title | Details | UK | UK Indie | FRA | GRE | SCO |
|---|---|---|---|---|---|---|
| Falling Off the Lavender Bridge | Released: 21 January 2008; Label: Domino; Formats: CD, LP, digital download | 45 | 5 | 105 | — | 72 |
| Life Is Sweet! Nice to Meet You | Released: 1 February 2010; Label: Domino; Formats: CD, LP, digital download | 102 | 10 | 181 | 30 | — |
"—" denotes a recording that did not chart or was not released in that territory.

=== Extended plays ===
| Title | Details |
|---|---|
| Patrick Wolf E.P. | Released: 2007; Label: Domino Records; Formats: CD |
| Lightspeed Champion | Released: 2008; Label: Domino Records; Formats: CD |
| Bye Bye | Released: 13 December 2010; Label: Domino Records; Formats: CD, 10" |

=== Singles ===
| Title | Year | Peak chart positions | | | Album |
| Title | Year | UK | UK Indie | SCO | Album |
|---|---|---|---|---|---|
| "How Do You Do?" (with Whirlwind Heat) | 2007 | — | 25 | — | Non-album single |
| "Galaxy of the Lost" | 2007 | 180 | 4 | 43 | Falling Off the Lavender Bridge |
| "Midnight Surprise" | 2007 | — (Note: "Midnight Surprise" did not enter the UK Singles Chart, but peaked at number 84 on the UK Physical Singles Chart.) | 10 | — | Falling Off the Lavender Bridge |
| "Tell Me What It's Worth" | 2008 | 72 | 3 | 12 | Falling Off the Lavender Bridge |
| "My Turn" (with Basement Jaxx) | 2009 | — | — | — | Scars |
| "Marlene" | 2010 | — | — (Note: "Marlene" did not enter the UK Independent Chart, but peaked at number 15 on the UK Independent Singles Breakers Chart.) | — | Life Is Sweet! Nice to Meet You |
| "Madame Van Damme" | 2010 | — | — | — | Life Is Sweet! Nice to Meet You |
"—" denotes a recording that did not chart or was not released in that territory.

==== Promotional singles ====
| Title | Year | Album |
|---|---|---|
| "Heavy Purple" | 2009 | Non-album single |
| "I Don't Want to Wake Up Alone" | 2010 | Life Is Sweet! Nice to Meet You |

=== Mixtapes ===
| Title | Details |
|---|---|
| Bad Covers E.P. | Released: 8 July 2007; Label: independent; Formats: digital download |
| Team Perfect Cover Green Day's Nimrod (with Florence Welch) | Released: 16 July 2007; Label: independent; Formats: digital download |
| I Wrote and Recorded This in Less Than Five Hours | Released: August 2007; Label: independent; Formats: digital download |
| Garageband Xmas EP | Released: 8 December 2007; Label: independent; Formats: digital download |
| Album in a Day 2 | Released: 4 October 2008; Label: independent; Formats: digital download |
| House-Sitting Songs | Released: June 2009; Label: independent; Formats: digital download |
| Icky Pasta | Released: 5 May 2010; Label: independent; Formats: digital download |

== Blood Orange ==
Blood Orange discography
- Studio albums: 5
- EPs: 1
- Singles: 24
- Mixtapes: 2

=== Studio albums ===
| Title | Details | Peak chart positions | | | | | | | | | |
| Title | Details | UK | AUS | BEL (FL) | BEL (WA) | FRA | GER | NLD | NOR | SWI | US |
|---|---|---|---|---|---|---|---|---|---|---|---|
| Coastal Grooves | Released: 30 August 2011; Label: Domino; Formats: CD, LP, digital download | 180 | — | — | — | — | — | — | — | — | — |
| Cupid Deluxe | Released: 18 November 2013; Label: Domino; Formats: CD, LP, digital download | 178 | — | 133 | — | — | — | — | — | — | 183 |
| Freetown Sound | Released: 28 June 2016; Label: Domino; Formats: CD, LP, digital download | 154 | — | 78 | 125 | — | 81 | 141 | 23 | 88 | 159 |
| Negro Swan | Released: 24 August 2018; Label: Domino; Formats: CD, LP, digital download | 64 | 99 | 40 | 161 | 165 | — | 76 | — | 72 | 98 |
| Essex Honey | Released: 29 August 2025; Label: RCA; Formats: CD, LP, digital download | 69 | 64 | 63 | 113 | 115 | — | — | — | 43 | — (Note: Essex Honey did not enter the US Billboard 200 but did peak at number 41 on the US Album Sales chart.) |
"—" denotes a recording that did not chart or was not released in that territory.

=== Extended play ===
| Title | Details |
|---|---|
| Four Songs | Released: 16 September 2022; Label: RCA |

=== Singles ===
| Title | Year | Peak chart positions | | | | | | | | | | Certifications | Album |
| Title | Year | UK Phys. | UK Indie | AUS | BEL (FL) Tip | CAN | LTU | MEX Ing. | NZ Hot | US Bub. | US Rock | Certifications | Album |
|---|---|---|---|---|---|---|---|---|---|---|---|---|---|
| "Dinner" | 2011 | — | — | — | — | — | — | — | — | — | — | | Non-album singles |
| "Toshito" | 2011 | — | — | — | — | — | — | — | — | — | — | | Non-album singles |
| "Sutphin Boulevard" | 2011 | — | — | — | — | — | — | — | — | — | — | | Coastal Grooves |
| "Champagne Coast" | 2011 | — | 12 | 95 | — | 88 | 25 | — | — | 5 | 16 | BPI: Gold; MC: Gold; RIAA: Platinum | Coastal Grooves |
| "Forget It" | 2012 | — | — | — | — | — | — | — | — | — | — | | Coastal Grooves |
| "Chamakay" | 2013 | — | — | — | — | — | — | — | — | — | — | | Cupid Deluxe |
| "You're Not Good Enough" | 2013 | — | — | — | 42 | — | — | 35 | — | — | — | | Cupid Deluxe |
| "Uncle Ace" | 2014 | — | — | — | — | — | — | — | — | — | — | | Cupid Deluxe |
| "Is It All Over My Face & Tower of Meaning" | 2014 | — | — | — | — | — | — | — | — | — | — | | Non-album single |
| "Sandra's Smile" | 2015 | — | — | — | — | — | — | — | — | — | — | | Freetown Sound |
| "Hadron Collider" (featuring Nelly Furtado) | 2016 | — | — | — | — | — | — | — | — | — | — | | Freetown Sound |
| "Augustine" | 2016 | — | — (Note: "Augustine" did not enter the UK Independent Chart, but peaked at number 19 on the UK Independent Singles Breakers Chart.) | — | — | — | — | — | — | — | — | | Freetown Sound |
| "I Know" | 2016 | — | — | — | — | — | — | — | — | — | — | | Freetown Sound |
| "Better Than Me" | 2016 | — | — | — | — | — | — | — | — | — | — | | Freetown Sound |
| "Charcoal Baby" | 2018 | — | — | — | — | — | — | — | — | — | — | MC: Gold; RIAA: Gold; RMNZ: Gold | Negro Swan |
| "Smoke" (remix) (with Yves Tumor featuring Ian Isiah) | 2018 | — | — | — | — | — | — | — | — | — | — | | Negro Swan |
| "Chewing Gum" (featuring A$AP Rocky And Project Pat) | 2018 | — | — | — | — | — | — | — | 32 | — | — | | Negro Swan |
| "Black History" | 2018 | 16 | — | — | — | — | — | — | — | — | — | | Non-album single |
| "Benzo" | 2019 | — | — | — | — | — | — | — | — | — | — | | Angel's Pulse |
| "Dark & Handsome" (featuring Toro y Moi) | 2019 | — | — | — | — (Note: "Dark & Handsome" did not enter the Flanders Ultratop 50, but charted as an "extra tip" on the Ultratip chart.) | — | — | — | 40 | — | — | | Angel's Pulse |
| "Call Me (Freestyle)" (with Park Hye Jin) | 2020 | — | — | — | — | — | — | — | — | — | — | | Non-album single |
| "The Field" (featuring The Durutti Column, Tariq Al-Sabir, Caroline Polachek and Daniel Caesar) | 2025 | — | — | — | — | — | — | — | 38 | — | — | | Essex Honey |
| "Somewhere In Between" | 2025 | — | — | — | — | — | — | — | — | — | — | | Essex Honey |
| "Mind Loaded" (featuring Caroline Polachek, Lorde and Mustafa) | 2025 | — | — | — | — | — | — | — | 22 | — | — | | Essex Honey |
| "Essex_Honey.mp3" | 2026 | — | — | — | — | — | — | — | 18 | — | — | | Non-album single |
"—" denotes a recording that did not chart or was not released in that territory.

==== Promotional singles ====
| Year | Title | Album |
|---|---|---|
| 2011 | "Sutphin Boulevard" | Coastal Grooves |
| 2011 | "Said No" | Coastal Grooves |
| 2014 | "It Is What It Is" | Cupid Deluxe |
| 2022 | "Jesus Freak Lighter" | Four Songs |

=== Other charted songs ===
| Title | Year | Peak chart positions | | Album |
| Title | Year | JPN Over. | NZ Hot | Album |
|---|---|---|---|---|
| "Look at You" | 2025 | — | 29 | Essex Honey |
| "Thinking Clean" | 2025 | — | 36 | Essex Honey |
| "Vivid Light" | 2025 | 15 | 17 | Essex Honey |

=== Mixtapes ===
| Title | Information | US |
|---|---|---|
| Home Recordings Mixtape | Released: 2011; Label: independent; Formats: CD, digital download | — |
| Angel's Pulse | Released: 12 July 2019; Label: Domino; Formats: Digital download, streaming, cassette | 163 |

== VeilHymn (with Bryndon Cook) ==
=== Single ===
| Year | Name | Information |
|---|---|---|
| 2017 | Hymn | Project with Bryndon Cook (Starchild & The New Romantic); Released: 8 February 2017; Hymn was created for an ad campaign by the email advertising company Mailchimp |

== Devonté Hynes ==
=== Film and television scores ===
| Year | Name | Director |
|---|---|---|
| 2013 | Palo Alto | Gia Coppola |
| 2019 | "Queen & Slim: The Soundtrack" with single: "Runnin' Away" (with Ian Isiah & Jason Arce) | Melina Matsoukas |
| 2020 | We Are Who We Are | Luca Guadagnino |
| 2020 | Mainstream | Gia Coppola |
| 2021 | In Treatment | Paris Barclay |
| 2021 | Passing | Rebecca Hall |
| 2021 | Beckett (Single: "Born to Be") | Ferdinando Cito Filomarino |
| 2022 | Master Gardener | Paul Schrader |
| 2026 | The Invite | Olivia Wilde |

=== Extended Plays ===
| Year | Name | Information |
|---|---|---|
| 2013 | Myths 001 (with Connan Mockasin) | Written and recorded with Connan Mockasin in Marfa, Texas as part of the 2015 Marfa Myths festival.; Released: 16 September 2015; Format: Streaming, digital download, vinyl (12", 45 rpm, 140g) |

=== Classical Works ===
| Year | Name | Information |
|---|---|---|
| 2019 | Fields | Accompaniment: Third Coast Percussion; Released: 11 October 2019; Label: Cedille Records; Formats: Streaming, CD, digital download |
| 2020 | Evil N****r (Live on the Black Power Live Broadcast, Los Angeles, 2020) | Released: 27 June 2020; Composer: Julius Eastman; Label: Swan House |

== Production, features, and writing discography ==
| Title | Year | Artist | Album | Credits |
|---|---|---|---|---|
| "Me & You" | 2010 | Diana Vickers | Songs from the Tainted Cherry Tree | Writing, production |
| "Everything Is Embarrassing" | 2012 | Sky Ferreira | Ghost | Writing, co-production |
| "Sleep in the Park" | 2012 | Solange Knowles | —N/a | Writing, production |
| "Losing You" | 2012 | Solange Knowles | True | Writing, production |
| "Some Things Never Seem to Fucking Work" | 2012 | Solange Knowles | True | Writing, production |
| "Locked in Closets" | 2012 | Solange Knowles | True | Writing, production |
| "Lovers in the Parking Lot" | 2012 | Solange Knowles | True | Writing, production |
| "Don't Let Me Down" | 2012 | Solange Knowles | True | Writing, production |
| "Look Good with Trouble" | 2012 | Solange Knowles | True | Writing, production |
| "Bad Girls" (Verdine Version) | 2012 | Solange Knowles | True | Writing, production |
| "Flatline" | 2013 | Mutya Keisha Siobhan | The Lost Tapes | Writing, production |
| "Fugitive" | 2013 | Tinashe | Black Water | Production |
| "Crystallize" | 2014 | Kylie Minogue | —N/a | Writing, production |
| "Hours" | 2014 | FKA twigs | LP1 | Writing, production, guitar |
| "Figure It Out (feat. Devonte Hynes & the Force MD's) [Bonus Track]" | 2014 | Theophilus London | Vibes | Writing, Vocals |
| "Want Your Feeling" | 2014 | Jessie Ware | Tough Love | Writing, additional production, guitar |
| "Bet" | 2014 | Tinashe | Aquarius | Writing, additional production, guitar |
| "Why Don't You Love Me?" | 2014 | Kindness | Otherness | |
| "Undiscovered" | 2015 | Laura Welsh | Fifty Shades of Grey: Original Motion Picture Soundtrack | Writing |
| "Unravel" | 2015 | Laura Welsh | Soft Control | Writing, production |
| "Home (feat. Dev Hynes)" | 2015 | Heems | Eat Pray Thug | Vocals |
| "All That" | 2015 | Carly Rae Jepsen | Emotion | Writing, production, programming, guitar |
| "Change" | 2015 | Le1f | Riot Boi | Writing, production |
| "A Kiss Goodbye (feat. Charlotte Gainsbourg, Sampha & Devonte Hynes)" | 2015 | Emile Haynie | We Fall | |
| "Body Language" | 2016 | Carly Rae Jepsen | Emotion: Side B | Writing |
| "Ghetto Boy" | 2016 | Tinashe | Nightride | Writing, production |
| "Nothing to Hide (feat. Devonté Hynes & Wiki)" | 2016 | Sporting Life | Slam Dunk, Vol. 3 - EP | Vocals |
| "You Never Knew" | 2017 | Haim | Something to Tell You | Writing, electric piano |
| "Long Time" | 2017 | Blondie | Pollinator | Writing, production |
| "Oh No" | 2017 | Willow | The 1st | Writing, production |
| "Hun43rd" "Brother Man" | 2018 | ASAP Rocky | Testing | Writing, production |
| "Hurt Feelings" | 2018 | Mac Miller | Swimming | Writing, production |
| "Self Care" | 2018 | Mac Miller | Swimming | Writing |
| "Everything to Me" | 2018 | Empress Of | Us | Writing, vocals |
| "Margiela Problems" (feat. Blood Orange) | 2018 | MadeinTYO | Sincerely, Tokyo | Writing, vocals, production |
| "Giving Me Life (feat. Slick Rick & Blood Orange)" | 2018 | Mariah Carey | Caution | Writing, vocals, production |
| "Shine" | 2019 | Danny Brown | U Know What I'm Sayin? | Writing, vocals |
| "did you feel me slip away?" | 2019 | BEA1991 | Brand New Adult | Bass |
| "i'm a goldmine" | 2019 | BEA1991 | Brand New Adult | Additional production |
| "Jade" (feat. Blood Orange) | 2019 | Lolo Zouaï | Ocean Beach - Single | Vocals |
| "rangerover" | 2019 | Porches | Ricky Music | Writing, vocals |
| "Even If It Hurts" (Blood Orange) | 2020 | Tei Shi | La Linda | Writing, Production |
| "This Is What They Say" | 2020 | Carly Rae Jepsen | Dedicated Side B | Writing |
| "We Will Always Love You" | 2020 | The Avalanches | We Will Always Love You | Writing, vocals |
| "Alien Love Call" | 2021 | Turnstile | Glow On | Writing, vocals |
| "Endless" | 2021 | Turnstile | Glow On | Vocals |
| "Lonely Dezires" | 2021 | Turnstile | Glow On | Vocals |
| "Bound" | 2021 | Wet | Letter Blue | Vocals, Production |
| "Choral No. 1 - Devonté Hynes Remodel (Featuring Emily Schubert)" | 2022 | Ryuichi Sakamoto | A Tribute to Ryuichi Sakamoto - To the Moon and Back | Production, Remix |
| "Prayer" | 2022 | Blackhaine | Armour II | Vocals |
| "Give my all - Blood Orange EDIT" | 2024 | Astrid Sonne | Great Doubt EDITS | Writing, Vocals, Production, Remix |
| "Baby Blue (featuring Norwill Simmonds)" | 2025 | Daniel Caesar | Son of Spergy | Writing |
| "Touching God (featuring Yebba and Blood Orange" | 2025 | Daniel Caesar | Son of Spergy | Writing & Vocals |
