= Sisteray =

British rock band

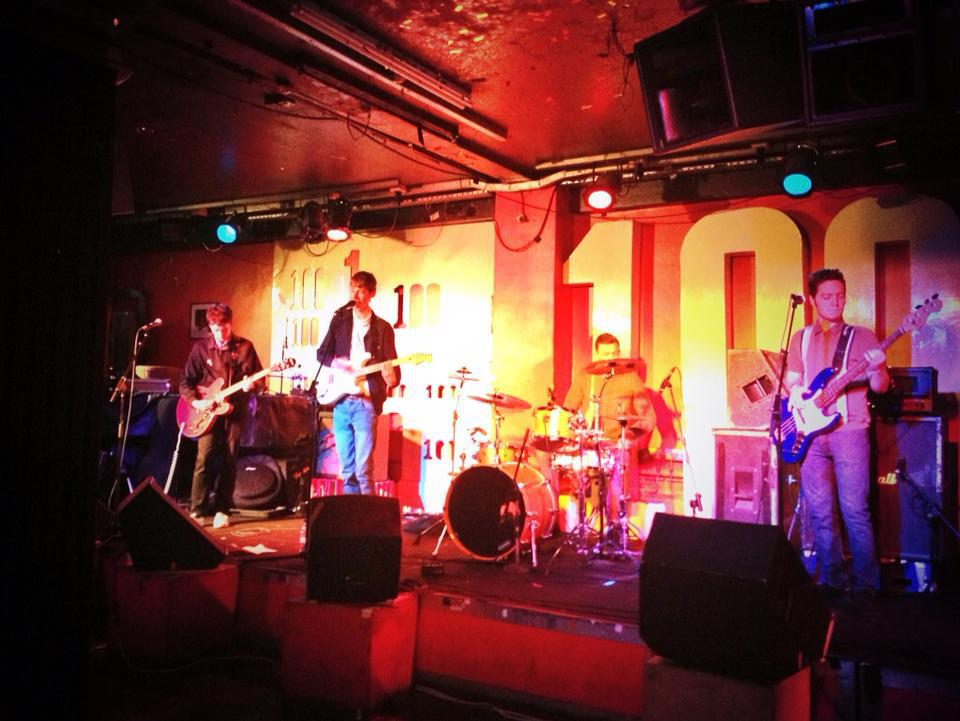
- Sisteray playing at the 100 Club

Background information
- Origin: London, England
- Genres: Rock and roll, Punk rock, Alternative
- Years active: 2015–present
- Label: Vallance Records
- Members: Niall Rowan; Daniel Connolly; George Greenhaulgh; Michael Hanrahan
- Past members: Ryan Connolly; Marco Biagini; Calum Landau
- Website: sisteray.com

Sisteray are a British four-piece rock band from London, UK. Formed in 2015, the band consists of Niall Rowan (lead vocals/rhythm guitar), Michael Hanrahan (bass/vocals), Daniel Connolly (lead guitar/vocals) and George Greenhalgh (drums).

== History ==
The band formed in Camden, London. Sisteray is an alternative four piece guitar band from East London formed around the songwriting partnership of singer Niall Rowan and lead guitarist Daniel Connolly, along with Michael Hanrahan on bass guitar and Ryan Connolly, younger brother of Daniel, on drums.

Ryan left the band to focus on his university studies in 2015 and was replaced by Italian national Marco Biagini. Marco brought with him a "musical background, playing in the Conservatory Music in Italy for 18 years'".

The band released their debut single No Escape in June 2015, which was recorded and produced at Bark Studios, London by Brian O'Shaunessey (Primal Scream).

In late 2015, the band recorded a Double A-side single, A Wise Man Said / Back to Yours, recorded at Lightship 95 in London, produced and mixed by former Test Icicles frontman Rory Attwell (Palma Violets, The Vaccines). The single was released on 12 February 2016, having already gained radio airplay from BBC Radio 1, BBC 6 Music, Radio X and Amazing Radio and being named This Feeling's Track of the Day in January 2016. This was followed up by the release of a single track 'Who R Ya?' in collaboration with 1234 Records (Buzzcocks).

In December 2016, Sisteray signed to Independent Label, Vallance Records. They released on the label was 00:01:57 Faaast Food on 24 February 2017. This was followed up by 5 track EP 15 Minutes on 14 April, peaking at 22 in the iTunes charts. The project title, 15 Minutes, refers to Andy Warhol's famous "15 minutes of fame" statement. The band explain: "Now more than ever, people seem to be given 15 minutes and 15 minutes only. It's not an album and it's not a single. It's simply a statement about the times we are living in..." The release saw the bands popularity grow, having been championed by BBC Radio 1, Radio X, BBC 6 Music, Louder Than War, Fred Perry and Clash. The band went on to play Camden Rocks and Reading festival that same year, followed by sold-out shows in Sheffield and London.

The band run a regular club night called Welcome to the Monkey House at various venues in London. The club night has grown in popularity and has seen the band open internationally, with two Paris nights.

In 2018, the band announced a new 4-track EP titled 'Sisteray Said' was released in September, following a sold-out show at London's Dingwalls. The EP gained notable press, with Louder Than War describing "Sometimes when you hear a band for the first time you know that there is just that little ‘je ne sais quoi’ about them. Something that sets them aside slightly, something that makes you sit up and pay attention as they distance themselves from the rest of their counterparts. Yes, you've guessed it, Sisteray are one such band." The EP peaked at number 9 in the iTunes chart. Notable performances at Isle of Wight Festival, Camden Rocks Festival, Tramlines, The Great Escape and a live streamed Pirate Studios session on Facebook; along with a performance live on Radio X and a series of radio plays has seen the bands popularity grow significantly. The band toured the new EP in October and November of 2018, concluded with a sold-out show at London's famous The 100 Club, which was attended by former England defender Stuart Pearce, after championing the band on TalkSport.

On April Fools' Day, 1 April 2019, premiered their new Brexit themed single April Fools on John Kennedy's Radio X show.

In November 2019, Sisteray released the single All Boys Club, produced and mixed by Rhys Downing (Bruno Mars, Pete Doherty).

== Musical style ==
Sisteray are influenced by 1970s punk era bands such as the Buzzcocks, the Gun Club and the Clash. Other influences include the Smiths, Nirvana and the Pogues. Sisteray have also cited John Cooper Clarke and Patti Smith as influences on their music.

== Personnel ==
- Niall Rowan - lead vocals and rhythm guitar
- Daniel Connolly - lead guitar and backing vocals
- George Greenhalgh - drums
- Michael Hanrahan - bass and backing vocals

== Discography ==
- No Escape (2015)
- A Wise Man Said / Back to Yours (2016)
- Gentrification (2016)
- Who R Ya? (2016)
- 00:01:57 Faast Food' (2017)
- 15 Minutes of Sisteray (2017)
- 00:03:08 Queen's English (2017)
- 3 Minutes of 00:03:53 (2017)
- White Knuckle Joyride Feral Five Remix (2017)
- Algorithm Prison (2018)
- Wannabes (2018)
- Algorithm Prison Feral Five Reconstruction (2018)
- Sisteray Said (2018)
- April Fools (2019)
- All Boys Club (2019)
