= NLS Crew =

- Genres: Hip hop, crunk, thrash metal, electro
- Years active: 2005–2006
- Members: Sam E Danger (a.k.a. Sam Mehran); Nigga Bullshit (a.k.a. Devonte Hynes); Velour Gangsta (a.k.a. Deano Jo, Head of Real Gold); Ben.L.S (a.k.a. Ben Rayner)
- Website: Official MySpace

NLS Crew was a short lived hip hop and thrash metal fusion group, formed as a spin-off from Test Icicles.

== History ==
The group was formed in February 2005 by Devonte Hynes, Sam Mehran, Deano Jo and photographer Ben Rayner. NLS Crew amalgamized the music of crunk, West Coast rap, thrash metal and electro, in a way similar to Hynes and Mehran's primary band, Test Icicles. The acronym "NLS" was taken from Mehran's Australian childhood friends, who used to use the term "Next Level Shit" to describe anything of quality.

In April 2005, the group self-released a 4 track EP, made entirely of music made using the Zoom SB-246. The group played two shows, one in Liverpool and the other in London, both of them in supporting Death from Above 1979 in May 2005, who later commissioned a 'Sammy Danger NLS Edit' of their track "Black History Month".
