= No Grace =

Studio album by Paws
- Released: 17 June 2016
- Studio: Chem19, Glasgow
- Length: 26:43
- Label: FatCat
- Producer: Mark Hoppus; Paws

Paws chronology
Youth Culture Forever (2014)	No Grace (2016)	Your Church On My Bonfire (2019)

Singles from No Grace
- 1. "No Grace" / "Gone So Long" Released: 12 April 2016

No Grace is the third album by Scottish band Paws. It was released on 17 June 2016 on FatCat Records.

== Background and release ==
Paws released their debut Cokefloat! in October 2012, and their second album Youth Culture Forever in June 2014. They toured both albums extensively, which led to feelings of burnout.

No Grace was recorded and produced by Blink-182 bassist Mark Hoppus. The tracks "No Grace" and "Gone So Long" were released as singles in April 2016, and sold as a cassette single called No Grace Tape.

== Themes ==
Taylor told DIY that title track "No Grace" is about "touring and friends sticking it out", and that "a lot of the other songs are a mish-mash of emotions that derive from being in a band, or just things between the three of us, and what we come up against." Adam Feibel of Exclaim! wrote that the album is "all about getting knocked down, picking yourself back up and taking your next swing." Writing for The Line of Best Fit, Dave Beech praised a sense of carpe diem in the writing.

== Critical reception ==
Professional ratings
Aggregate scores
Source	Rating
AnyDecentMusic?	7.1/10
Metacritic	76/100
Review scores
Source	Rating
The 405	7.5/10
AllMusic	3.5/5 stars
Clash	7/10
DIY	3/5 stars
Drowned in Sound	8/10
Exclaim!	7/10
The Line of Best Fit	8/10
The Skinny	4/5 stars
Under the Radar	8/10

On review aggregator Metacritic the album holds a score of 76/100, based on 9 reviews, indicating a "generally favorable" reception. Under the Radar called No Grace a career highlight for Paws, and rated it 8/10. The Skinny called the album a "breezy treat", and praised Hoppus' production work. Nina Keen of DIY was critical of Taylor's shift to singing with an American accent.

On 14 June 2016 Seattle radio station KEXP chose lead single "No Grace" to be their "Song of the Day", describing it as "the kind of anthem that was built to soundtrack life-changing basement shows."

== Track listing ==
No.	Title	Length
1.	"No Grace"	03:11
2.	"N/A"	03:29
3.	"Impermanent"	02:45
4.	"Gone So Long"	02:17
5.	"Complete Contempt"	03:15
6.	"Gild The Lily"	02:57
7.	"Empire State"	01:24
8.	"Salt Lake"	02:16
9.	"Clarity"	02:04
10.	"Asthmatic"	02:58
Total length:		26:43

== Personnel ==
Paws

- Phillip Jon Taylor – vocals, guitar, lyrics
- Josh Swinney – drums
- Ryan Drever – bass

Other credits

- Phillip Jon Taylor – piano on "Impermanent"
- Mark Hoppus – additional vocals on "Impermanent"

Technical

- Mark Hoppus, Paws – production
- James Ingram – engineering
- Alan Douches – mastering
- Stephen Watkins – mixing

Artistic

- Erin McGrath – cover art, liner art
