= Paws (band) =

Scottish alternative rock band

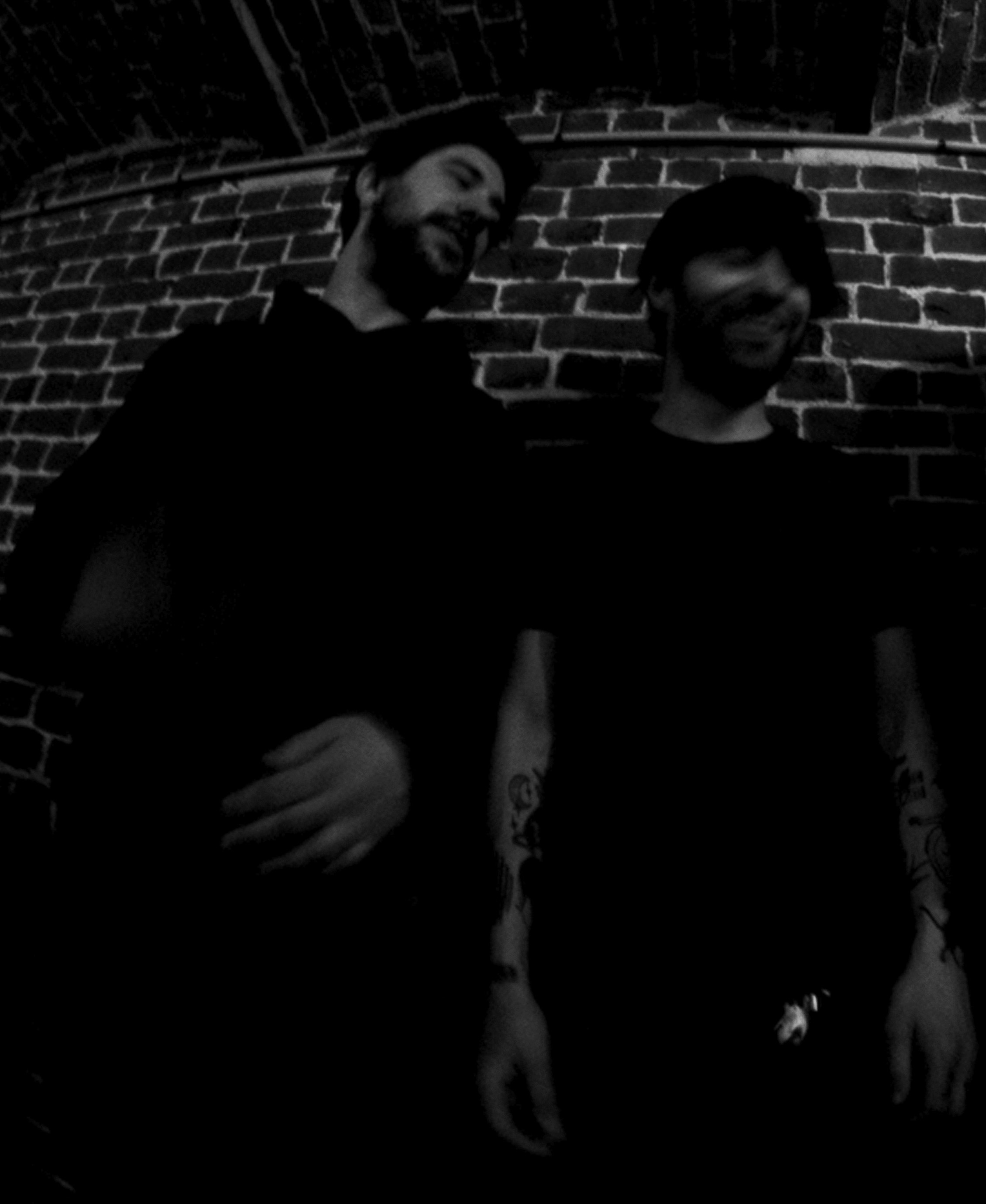

Background information
- Origin: Highlands/Glasgow/Edinburgh, Scotland
- Genres: Alternative rock; indie rock; punk rock
- Years active: 2010–present
- Labels: FatCat; Ernest Jenning; Wish Fulfillment Press; Cath Records
- Members: Phillip Jon Taylor; Josh Swinney
- Past members: Matthew Scott; Ryan Drever; John Bonnar
- Website: thebandpaws.com

Paws are a Scottish alternative rock band formed in Glasgow in 2010. To date, they have released five studio albums via FatCat Records and Ernest Jenning.

== History ==
=== 2009–2012 ===
Paws formed in 2010 after the disbandment of a short lived DIY folk-punk band situated in Glasgow called A Copenhagen Hope. Their first official show as Paws was on 17 May 2010 at Stereo Cafe Bar in Glasgow opening for Dum Dum Girls. Following this, the band played regularly in Glasgow and other parts of Scotland establishing their presence in the Scottish music scene. In their first year, they opened for many other touring acts from the US including Ariel Pink, No Age, Wavves and Ty Segall. During this time, Paws released their first home recordings on hand made compact cassette tapes via the band's DIY imprint CATH Records.

In 2011 Gerry Loves Records released the first Paws vinyl single. "Lekker/Booger" was released as a double A-side single on one side of a split 7-inch on 8 August 2011. The band made their first music festival appearances this same summer in Scotland at T in the Park Festival, Wickerman Festival, Belladrum Tartan Heart Festival, Loopallu Festival and Go North Festival.

=== 2012–2013 ===
In 2012 the band signed with New York City/Brighton based label FatCat Records. In January the band recorded their debut studio album with Rory Attwell on the Lightship 95, a professional recording studio on a 550 tonne ship, permanently moored at Trinity Buoy Wharf, East London. The band released a self-recorded cassette EP entitled Misled Youth and embarked on tours with Bleached and Japandroids throughout the United Kingdom and Europe. Paws's debut studio album Cokefloat! was released on FatCat Records on 8 October 2012.

To support the album's release, the band toured extensively for the entirety of 2013 and this included their first tour of North America. Shortly after completing a UK tour in February, the band played their first gig in the United States at Glasslands in Brooklyn, NY on 5 March 2013. Matthew Scott announced his departure from Paws and played his final performance with the band on 4 May 2013 in Dublin, Ireland. Cokefloat! also received a nomination for the Scottish Album of the Year Award in 2013.

Close friend Kacey Underwood of London-based group Big Deal filled in playing bass guitar for Paws in order to help maintain a booking commitment that was made for the band to perform at Tufnell Park Dome supporting Brooklyn based band Beach Fossils on 14 May 2013.

Ryan Drever was added as the band's official third member shortly after, and the new line-up embarked on a second U.S tour which included an appearance at New York's Seaport Music Festival as well as dates supporting Fucked Up and Mates of State. The band returned home from this tour to open for the Breeders at the ABC in Glasgow and then immediately began back to back UK tours including support tours with We Are Scientists and the Cribs. In November 2013 Paws began recording their second studio album for FatCat Records in Upstate New York. The album was co-produced by band members Taylor and Swinney alongside engineer Jeremy Backofen. The cello arrangements on the recording sessions were performed by Isabel Castelvi as well as some accompaniment piano playing by Adam Pierce (Mice Parade). The album was mixed by Peter Katis. A live and impromptu cover of Decepticon by Le Tigre was recorded during the album recording as the band did not want to waste tape. Friend of the band Michelle Zauner later added vocals to the recording. After this tracking session, the band embarked on a coast to coast tour of the U.S playing a number of these recently recorded and unreleased album tracks. The second leg of which saw them play debut performances on the West Coast which included their debut live appearance on KEXP-FM Seattle. Their first Los Angeles performance was at the Satellite in the Silver Lake neighbourhood on 26 November 2013. The performance was recorded and later released as live album and limited edition hand made cassette tape via CATH Records.

=== 2014 ===
Beginning in February, Paws embarked on a UK tour that led straight into a three-month-long tour with friends We Are Scientists throughout Europe, the United States and Canada for the first time. During the two-month tour of the U.S., on 8 May 2014, as the band travelled towards the Constellation Room in Santa Ana, California, where they were expected to perform that evening, the band were informed that their performance would not go ahead as planned due to a Morrissey concert taking place at the same time in the Constellation Room's sister venue, the Observatory. Upset by their contracted performance becoming abruptly cancelled by the artist, the band took to social media to express their upset, which resulted in viral news media reporting. After much dispute, it was scheduled that both performances would go ahead under the condition that the sold out We Are Scientists and Paws show would take place once the Morrissey concert had ended. Youth Culture Forever was released in the U.S and Canada on 5 May 2014 and 2 June in the UK/Europe/Rest of the world. Youth Culture Forever was placed in many end of year lists by the music press. ABC News placed the album at number 35 in their "Top 50 Albums of the Year" list and Youth Culture Forever became the band's second studio album to receive a nomination for Scottish Album of the Year (SAY Award).

=== 2015–present ===
In July 2015 the band completed their third studio album, No Grace. The album was produced by Mark Hoppus of blink-182. It was released on 17 June 2016.

Bass player Ryan Drever left the band shortly after a long stretch of European touring to promote the album. He was replaced by Glasgow musician John Bonnar and the band continued touring extensively to campaign the albums release. This schedule included performances at SXSW, a co-headline North American tour with Dude York, a second live performance broadcast on KEXP-FM Seattle, a debut live session at Audiotree in Chicago, joining Frightened Rabbit on their tour of the UK and Europe to promote their album Painting of a Panic Attack and a North American tour with the Cribs. Other live performances in 2018 included dates with Mastersystem, Death Cab for Cutie, Idlewild and a co-headline UK tour with Daddy Issues (band). Taylor also toured Europe as a solo act for the first time in spring 2018 after being invited to open for Japanese Breakfast. Taylor also opened the billing as a solo act for Death Cab for Cutie in Amsterdam at the Bostheater.

In 2019, Paws released their fourth album, Your Church On My Bonfire. Produced by Frightened Rabbit's Andy Monaghan, it presented a more acoustic and reflective sound, with lyrics dealing with the personal turmoil of the previous few years experienced by band members. Guest vocals on the track "The Slow Sprint" were recorded by Gregory and the Hawk. For initial shows in the US and the UK to promote the release of the record, the band were joined by Frightened Rabbit's Simon Liddell on guitar.

== Discography ==
=== Studio albums ===
- Cokefloat! (2012)
- Youth Culture Forever (2014)
- No Grace (2016)
- Your Church On My Bonfire (2019)
- Paws (2023)

=== Live albums ===
- Live Los Angeles at the Satellite (2014)

=== Cassettes ===
- Paws Vol. 1 (2010)
- Paws Vol. 2 (2011)
- Paws Vol. 3 (2011)
- Misled Youth EP (2012)
- Tiger Lily Demo Tape (2013)
- Live in Los Angeles at the Satellite (2014)

=== 7" singles ===
- "Lekker" / "Booger" (2011)
- "Omaha" / "Eventual Hell" (2017)
