= Apple tree (disambiguation) =

An apple tree is a plant species known for its fruit, the apple.

Apple tree, Appletree and similar may also refer to:

== Places ==
- Appletree Cove, a bay in Washington, USA
- Appletree Eyot, an island in the River Thames in England

== Music ==
- AppleTree, an indie rock band from Bogotá, Colombia
- Apple Tree (album), a 1996 EP by Applejaxx
- "Apple Tree", a song by Australian band Wolfmother from their self-titled debut album
- "Apple Tree", a song by Aurora from A Different Kind of Human (Step 2)
- "Apple Trees", a song by Faun Fables from Early Song
- "Apple Trees", a song by Eels from End Times
- "Appletree" (song), a 1998 song by Erykah Badu
- The Apple Tree, a 1966 Broadway musical

== Other uses ==
- Apple Tree (horse), a French Thoroughbred racehorse
- Apple Trees (film), a 1992 German film
- The Apple Tree (anthology), a 1952 book by Daphne du Maurier
- "The Apple Tree" (short story), a 1916 short story by John Galsworthy
- AppleTree Markets, an American supermarket chain
- Isaac Newton's apple tree, an aspect of the scientific analysis of gravity

== See also ==
- Malus, the genus of apple trees
