= Vant (band) =

British indie rock band (2014–2021)

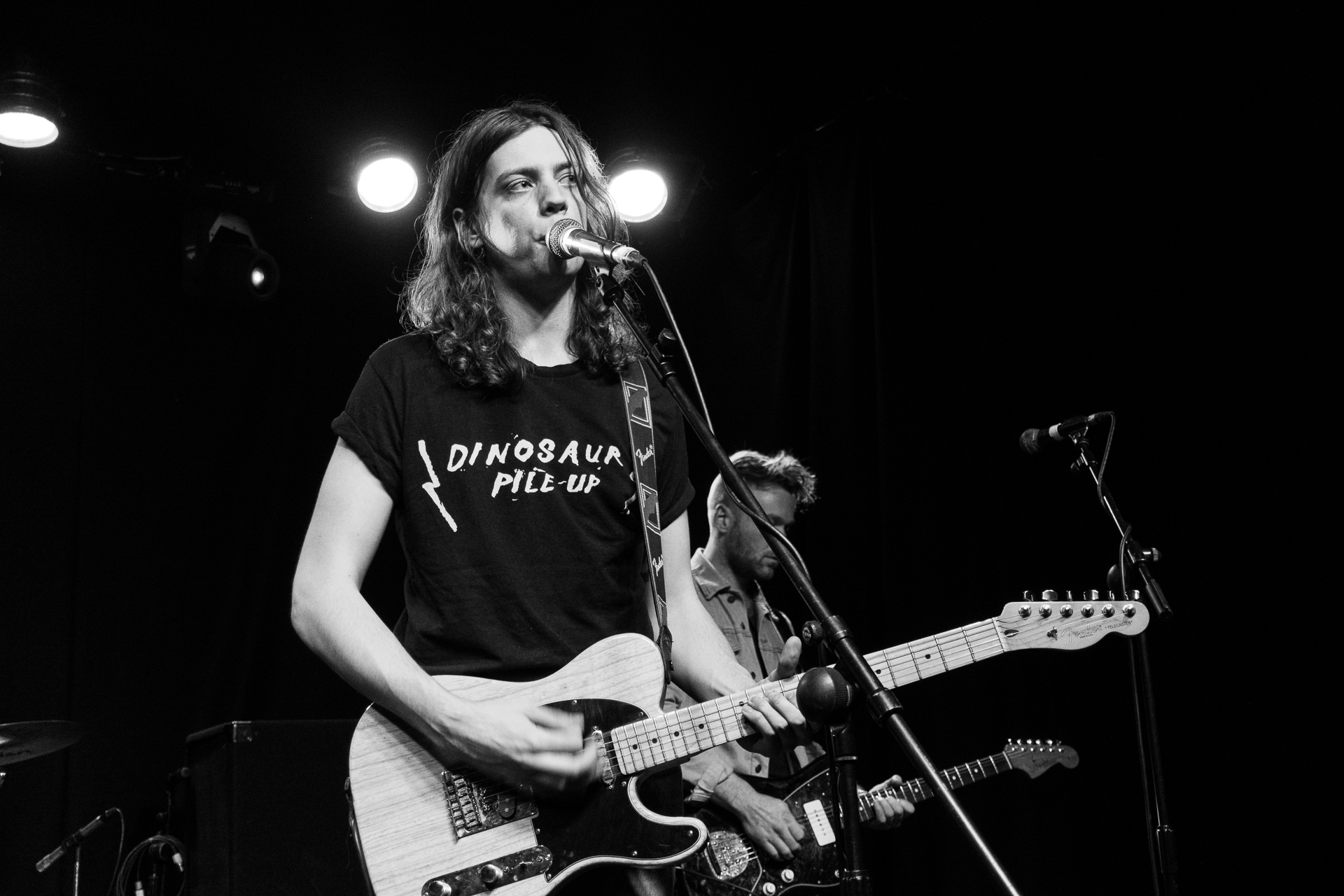
- Vant at Boston Music Rooms in 2015 by Paul Hudson

Background information
- Origin: London, England
- Genres: Alternative rock; punk rock; garage rock
- Years active: 2014–2021
- Labels: Parlophone, Dumb Blood
- Past members: Mattie Vant
- Website: wearevant.co.uk

Vant (stylised as VANT) were an English indie rock band, formed in 2014 by frontman and songwriter Mattie Vant. In 2015, Vant signed to Parlophone Records. The band announced an "indefinite hiatus" in 2017 to take effect at the end of their Last Days of Punk tour during November. The band released a new song, "Propaganda Machine" in December 2018 and teased new music in 2019.

Vant currently performs under the name Father Hell.

== Background ==
The band came together in London, while Mattie was working at Dalston venue, Birthdays. Originally from Seaham, Mattie has played in various bands, formulating the style for Vant while living in Brighton.

A lot of Vant's lyrical themes deal with political issues, with Mattie citing inspiration from global issues; "My concerns are worldwide things. It's not strictly centred around the UK - it's wars, global conflict, global warming". With this philosophy, Vant prefer to refer to their origin as 'Planet Earth' - rather than associate with a particular nationality. Of this issue, Mattie says "I don't believe in borders, I was born on Planet Earth". This is evidenced in the lyrics to "Birth Certificate".

Vant toured throughout 2015 and have made appearances with Royal Blood, toured on DIY Magazine's NEU tour with The Big Moon and InHeaven and appeared at several festivals through the summer, including Reading and Leeds Festivals, Secret Garden Party and Dot To Dot Festival. They started 2016 with an appearance on BBC Radio 1's Future Festival and toured the UK and Europe through the beginning of the year. They continue into festivals through the summer, including Glastonbury Festival, 2000 Trees, Japan's Fuji Rock Festival, Reading and Leeds Festivals, plus one off dates with Biffy Clyro and Catfish and the Bottlemen.

The songs "The Answer", "Parking Lot", "Fly by Alien", "Karma Seeker" and "Peace & Love" have all received premieres on BBC Radio 1 as Annie Mac's 'Hottest Record in the World'. The song "Parking Lot" was featured in the trailer for the video game Pro Evolution Soccer 2017. The track also appears on the game's soundtrack.

The band released their debut album Dumb Blood on 17 February 2017. It peaked at number 46 on the UK Albums Chart.

On 2 October 2017, the band announced via a Facebook post they were taking an "indefinite hiatus". With the announcement the band also declared their upcoming tour, "The Last Days of Punk" to be their final and announced a final mini-album called Talk like Thunder.

On 18 November 2018, exactly a year after the band's last show, a video was posted on the band's social media pages of lead singer Mattie as well as their profile pictures being turned into a black screen and the stylization of the band's name being changed to lower case. On 3 December those signed up to the band's mailing list were sent a link to a new song entitled "Propaganda Machine". The song showed the band turning away from punk rock sound of their previous music and turn towards a hip-hop/pop inspired sound. On 12 April the band released the EP Exoskeleton, which featured "Propaganda Machine" and the previously released single "Thank Lucifer".

== Band members ==
=== Studio ===
- Mattie Vant – vocals, various instruments (2014–present)

=== Live ===
- Mattie Vant – lead vocals, guitar (2014–present)
- Alice Costelloe - bass guitar (2019–present)
- Ed Hayes - guitar (2019–present)
- Adam Gammage - drums (2019–present)

==== Past live members ====
- Billy Morris – bass guitar (2014-2017)
- Henry Eastham – guitar (2014-2017)
- Martin Söderin - drums (2014-2015)
- David 'Greenie' Green – drums (2015-2017)

== Discography ==
=== Studio albums ===
- Dumb Blood (2017)
- Conceived in the Sky (2020)
- Extinction Ballads (2021)

=== Mini albums ===
- Talk Like Thunder (2017)

=== EPs ===
- Karma Seeker (2016)
- Exoskeleton (2019)

=== Singles ===
Title	Release date
"Parasite"	22 April 2015
"The Answer"	24 July 2015
"Parking Lot"	30 September 2015
"Fly-By Alien"	10 February 2016
"Karma Seeker"	21 June 2016
"Peace & Love"	11 October 2016
"Do You Know Me?"	1 January 2017
"Thank Lucifer"	25 January 2019
"Propaganda Machine"	22 February 2019
"Exoskeleton"	12 April 2019
