= Sam Mehran =

American-Australian musician, songwriter, and producer

- Mehran in a promotional shot for Outer Limits Recordings, 2010

Background information
- Also known as: Sam Meringue; Sam Crowley; Blues Runner; Explorers; Flashback Repository; Matrix Metals; Moon Rax; Sam E. Danger; Outer Limitz; Outer Limits Recordings; P.aisley Mist; S*A*M; Wingdings
- Born: August 17, 1986; Miami, Florida, U.S.
- Died: July 28, 2018 (aged 31) Los Angeles, California, U.S.
- Genres: Lo-fi; hypnagogic pop
- Occupations: Musician; songwriter; producer
- Instruments: Vocals; guitar; keyboards
- Years active: 2001–2018
- Labels: Domino; Olde English Spelling Bee; Hippos In Tanks; Gunk TV Records
- Formerly of: 2 X Love; 90210; Green Crack; LA Vampires; Greatest Hits; Raw Thrills; NLS Crew; The Sweethearts; Test Icicles; Yoga

Sam Mehran (/ˈmɜːræn/ MUR-an; August 17, 1986 – July 28, 2018) was an American-Australian musician, songwriter, and producer who co-founded the punk band Test Icicles and later formed the solo projects Matrix Metals and Outer Limits Recordings (OLR). His solo work differed substantially from Test Icicles and was often produced in a lo-fi manner. He received little critical notice in his lifetime, a Dazed Digital editor commented, however, "Mehran possessed an incomparable talent that belied his relatively low public profile." His first album as Matrix Metals, Flamingo Breeze, was described as a pioneering work of the vaporwave genre.

== Career ==
Mehran, along with Rory Attwell and Devonté Hynes, founded Test Icicles in 2004. The band was active until 2006, when it broke up. Mehran began releasing music under the alias Outer Limits Recordings in 2010, which was immediately associated with the era's loose-knit, early hypnagogic pop and chillwave scene. He described himself being influenced mostly by Ariel Pink, R. Stevie Moore, and "basically most music that was recorded before 1990." Music journalist Paul Lester characterized OLR as "heavenly hooks and catchy choruses". Marc Masters of The Wire compared his Foxy Baby album to Ariel Pink's "AM pop blender", and described the Matrix Metals album Flamingo Breeze as a "mini-masterpiece of sub-disco loops".

OLR issued numerous cassette tapes and limited edition vinyl discs, and according to Mehran, the project lasted until "somewhere in the spring of 2011". Its first LP release was the compilation Singles, Demos and Rarities (2007-2010), released on April 15, 2013, and was intended to be its only album. A follow-up, Birds, Bees, Babys, Bacteria, was issued on cassette later that year. After OLR, Mehran co-wrote and co-produced Katie Rush's Law of Attraction (2014). He then produced Puro Instinct's Autodrama (2016) and Samantha Urbani's Policies of Power (2017).

His last work released before his death was his co-writing and co-production of Ssion's O (2018). Prior to his death, he was working on co-writing and production of Katie Rush's second and third album. The second Katie Rush album Stage Life was released postmortem in April 2019.

== Death ==
Mehran died by suicide at his home in Hollywood on July 28, 2018, aged 31. His body was found the following morning. His final album, titled Cold Brew, was eventually released on July 28, 2021, the third anniversary of his death.

== Discography ==
Studio albums

- Mind Surfers Installation 04/12/08 (2009) (as Blues Runner)
- Bermuda Telepaths (2009) (as Explorers)
- Flashback Repository (2009) (as Flashback Repository)
- Flamingo Breeze (2009) (as Matrix Metals)
- Foxy Baby (2009) (as Outer Limits Recordings)
- Wingdings I: Return to Earth (2009) (as Wingdings)
- Wingdings II: Zarathustra's Puzzle (2009) (as Wingdings)
- Wingdings III: Symbol of Infinity (2009) (as Wingdings)
- So Unreal (2011) (as Matrix Metals, collaboration with LA Vampires)
- I Kontact (2012) (as Outer Limitz)
- Birds, Bees, Babys, Bacteria (2013) (as Outer Limits Recordings)
- Birds, Bees, Babys, Bacteria (GTVR Edition) (2016) (as Outer Limits Recordings)
- Cold Brew (2021) (posthumous)

Compilation

- Singles, Demos & Rarities 2007-2010 (2013) (as Outer Limits Recordings)

See also

- For Screening Purposes Only (2005) (Test Icicles)
- Megafauna (2009) (Yoga)
- The Flower Lane (2013) (Ducktails)
