= Cokefloat! =

Studio album by Paws
- Released: 8 October 2012
- Studio: Lightship95, London
- Length: 41:49
- Label: FatCat Records

Paws chronology
Cokefloat! (2012)	Youth Culture Forever (2014)

Singles from Cokefloat!
- 1. "Jellyfish / Bloodline" Released: 30 July 2012; 2. "Sore Tummy" Released: 1 October 2012

Cokefloat! is the debut album by Scottish band Paws. It was released on 8 October 2012 on FatCat Records.

== Background and promotion ==
In 2010 and 2011, Paws released four EPs on cassette label Cath Records, which they owned and ran from the house they shared. Some songs from those EPs were re-recorded for Cokefloat!. Paws signed to FatCat in 2012 and released the EP Misled Youth in May of that year.

Several tracks on Cokefloat! have lyrics about songwriter Phillip Jon Taylor's mother, who died of cancer when he was 21.

The single "Sore Tummy" was a playable track in the video game Rocksmith 2014.

== Critical reception ==
Professional ratings
Aggregate scores
Source	Rating
AnyDecentMusic?	6.9/10
Metacritic	66/100
Review scores
Source	Rating
AllMusic	4/5 stars
DIY	3.5/5 stars
Pitchfork	7.1/10
PopMatters	4/10

On Metacritic the album holds a score of 66/100, based on 9 reviews, indicating a "generally favorable" reception. Ian Cohen of Pitchfork described "Catherine 1956" and "Bloodline" as "frankly astonishing."

Several reviewers noted a strong influence of 90s grunge on the album. Writing for BBC Music, Mike Haydock described the album as "tuneful and energetic but a little unoriginal" and drew comparisons to Sonic Youth, Dinosaur Jr. and The Lemonheads, as well as to contemporaries like Yuck. Pitchfork described the album as "alternately thrilling and mildly embarrassing for being the sum of its 90s influences." Jason Lymangrover of AllMusic wrote that the album "references '90s guitar rockers like Dinosaur Jr. and Teenage Fanclub, and manages to channel the fun aspects of noisy slacker pop."

The album was shortlisted for the 2013 Scottish Album of the Year Award, losing to RM Hubbert's Thirteen Lost & Found.

== Track listing ==
No.	Title	Length
1.	"Catherine 1956"	03:05
2.	"Jellyfish"	02:41
3.	"Homecoming"	03:24
4.	"Pony"	04:05
5.	"Bloodline"	02:05
6.	"Boregasm"	02:21
7.	"Sore Tummy"	03:34
8.	"Get Bent"	03:54
9.	"Tulip"	03:06
10.	"Miss American Bookworm"	03:26
11.	"Bird Inside Birdcage, Ribcage Inside"	03:06
12.	"Winners Don't Bleed"	02:00
13.	"Poor Old Christopher Robin"	05:07
Total length:		41:49

== Personnel ==
Paws

- Phillip Jon Taylor
- Josh Swinney
- Matthew Scott

Other musicians

- Phillip Jon Taylor – lyrics on all tracks
- Alice Costelloe – vocals on "Sore Tummy"
- Catherine Helen Taylor – lyrics on "Tulip"

Technical

- Rory Attwell – recording
- Alan Douches – mastering

Artistic

- Jessical Penfold – cover artwork
