= Conceived in the Sky =

Studio album by Vant
- Released: 10 January 2020
- Recorded: 2018–19
- Genre: Indie rock, punk rock
- Length: 34:53
- Label: Dumb Blood
- Producer: Sam Miller

Vant chronology
Talk Like Thunder (2017)	Conceived in the Sky (2020)	Extinction Ballads (2021)

Singles from Conceived in the Sky
- 1. "Thank Lucifer" Released: 25 January 2019; 2. "Propaganda Machine" Released: 22 February 2019; 3. "Exoskeleton" Released: 12 April 2019

Conceived in the Sky is the second studio album by British band, Vant. The album was released on 10 January 2020 through Dumb Blood Records.

== Track listing ==
All lyrics are written by Mattie Vant; all music is composed by Mattie Vant and Henry Eastman.

No.	Title	Length
1.	"On My Way Through"	1:33
2.	"Mary Don't Miss Me"	3:52
3.	"Around for the Aesthetic"	0:42
4.	"Lie to Myself"	3:46
5.	"Best Friends"	3:42
6.	"Exoskeleton"	3:57
7.	"Propaganda Machine"	3:28
8.	"He Just Wants to Fuck with Us"	0:14
9.	"Thank Lucifer"	3:21
10.	"Photographic Head"	4:08
11.	"La La La Blow My Brains Out"	1:43
12.	"Atlas Falling"	3:22
13.	"Give Up - Morrissey's Racist"	1:00
Total length:		34:53
