= Boa vs. Python (song) =

Single by Test Icicles

from the album For Screening Purposes Only
- B-side: "Dancing on Pegs"
- Released: 1 August 2005
- Recorded: 2005
- Genre: Dance-punk, indie rock
- Length: 3:02
- Label: Domino
- Songwriter(s): Rory Attwell, Sam Mehran
- Producer(s): James Ford

Test Icicles singles chronology
"Boa vs. Python" (2005)	"Circle. Square. Triangle" (2005)

"Boa vs. Python" is the debut single by Test Icicles from their debut album For Screening Purposes Only. It was released on 1 August 2005. The song peaked at No. 46 on the UK Singles Chart.

== Track listing ==
CD: Domino / DNO 76 - U.S.

No.	Title	Length
1.	"Boa vs. Python"	3:02
2.	"All You Need Is Blood"	4:07
3.	"LMNO Hoes"	1:17
4.	"What's in the Box"	3:04

CD: Domino / RUG205CDP - UK

No.	Title	Length
1.	"Boa vs. Python"	3:02
2.	"Dancing on Pegs"	2:16

7": Domino / RUG205 - UK

No.	Title	Length
1.	"Boa vs. Python"	3:02
2.	"Dancing on Pegs"	2:16

12": Domino / DNO 76 - U.S.

No.	Title	Length
1.	"Boa vs. Python"	3:02
2.	"All You Need Is Blood"	4:07
3.	"LMNO Hoes"	1:17
4.	"What's in the Box"	3:04

== Charts ==
Charts (2005)	Peak position
UK Singles Chart	46
