= AppleTree =

Colombian rock band

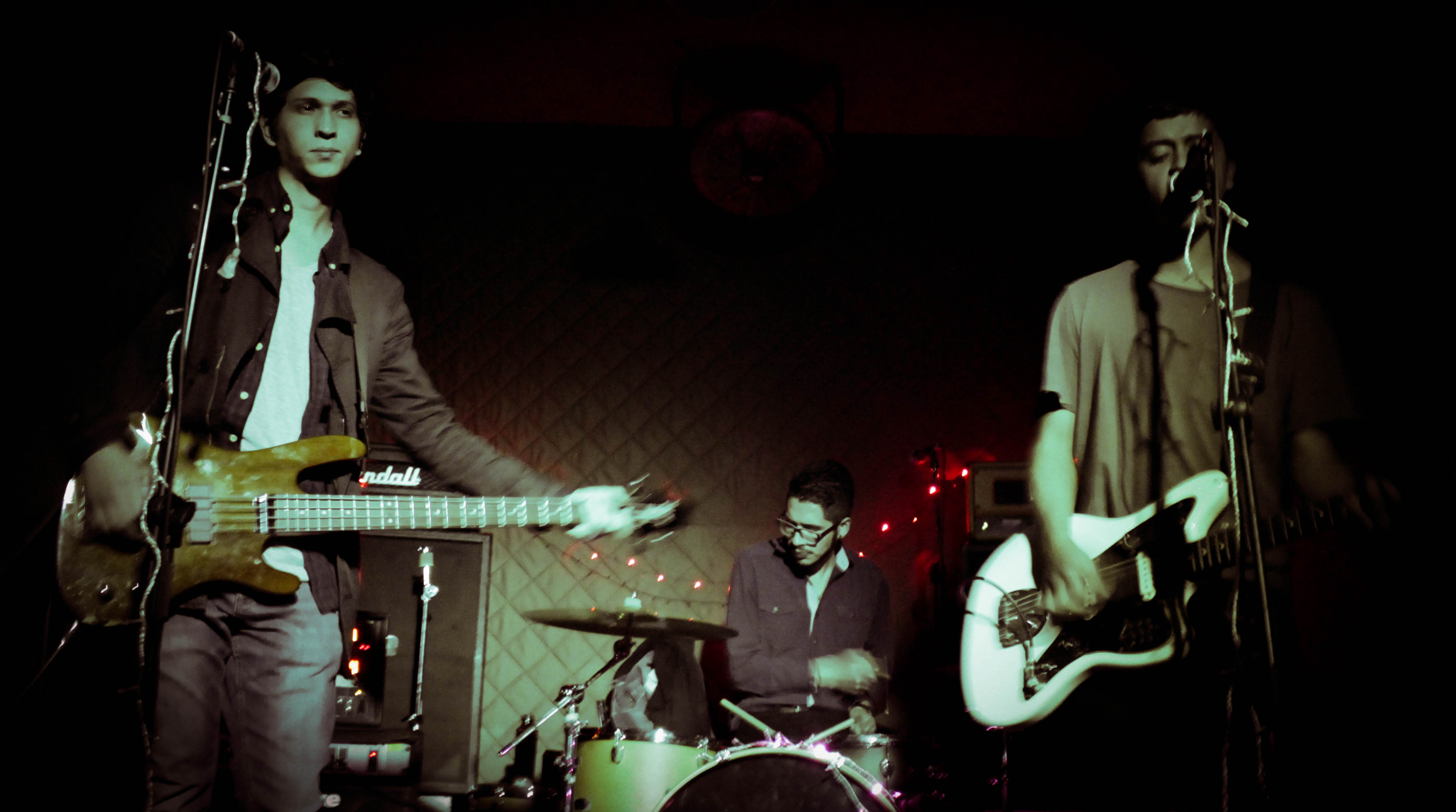
- AppleTree performing in Bogotá, 2015

Background information
- Origin: Bogotá, Colombia
- Genres: Lo-fi, indie rock, garage rock revival, post-punk revival, punk rock
- Years active: 2012–present
- Labels: Elpatron Records
- Members: Camilo Andres Cardenas; Alex Gonzalez; Cristian Galeano
- Website: appletree.bandcamp.com

AppleTree is a Colombian rock band formed in Bogotá in 2012. It consists of Camilo Andrés Cárdenas (lead vocals, guitar), Alex González (bass) and Cristian Galeano (drums). Their music is inspired by indie rock bands with Lo-Fi aesthetics like Pavement, Guided by Voices, Dinosaur Jr. and Sebadoh.

== Beginning: Draft (EP) ==
They recorded their first EP called Draft by mid 2012 with Fabián Cárdenas as producer and their bedrooms as studio. This EP was mastered in Blue Mountain in Nashville, USA. In October 2012 Galeano joined the band and they played their first gigs opening for the British band the Palace of Justice in different cities of Colombia.

Draft was reviewed by blogs and media in the US, England, Germany, Switzerland, Canada, Mexico, Argentina, Costa Rica, Venezuela and Colombia. In 2013 AppleTree was listed as one of the "seven overseas bands you've gotta listen" by I.R.C. (U.S.A.)

== Stand Out of My Sunlight ==
In 2014 AppleTree release the video of their new song "Stand Out of My Sunlight" and announced their new EP of the same name, released some weeks later through the independent label Elpatron Records. This EP was listed in the top 10 of Colombian albums by Escena Indie en Colombia, one of the most important music websites of Colombia.

The Stand Out of My Sunlight EP was recorded in Bogotá and mastered at UTC Studio, Stoke-on-Trent, England. The EP was broadcast on British radio stations like Radicals Rising and 6 Towns Radio. Again, musical press reviewed their work and pointed the advance of AppleTree in this new EP, inspired by bands like the Replacements and Buzzcocks.

"Subterranean Gardens", the second video of the EP was released in 2015. It was directed by Gabriel Muelle, longtime collaborator of the band, who created the artwork of the EP too.

In September 2015 they released the video for "Witch Hunt", the third video from Stand Out of My Sunlight.

== "Queen & Drones" / "Nube Blanca" ==
In October 2015 AppleTree announced gigs in London, where they played at venues like the New Cross Inn, the Islington and 12 Bar. In February 2016, they released their new singles "Queens & Drones" / "Nube Blanca" that were recorded in London by Rory Attwell, producer of bands like the Vaccines, Palma Violets and Yuck.

== Horas Perdidas ==
During the end of 2017 AppleTree traveled to Nashville, Tennessee to record their first album Horas Perdidas with Ken Coomer, founding member of Wilco, as drummer and producer, at Cartoon Moon studio. This work was mixed by Patrick Miller and mastered by Jonathan Pines at Private Studios in Urbana, Illinois. Two guitarists from the indie rock scene in Bogotá, Harry Revelo (Las Malas Lenguas) and Gabe Silva (No Stories) joined the band for the shows of the new album.

Horas Perdidas was released in September 2018, through Elpatron Records, and the title song "Horas Perdidas" was the main single. At the end of 2018 the specialized blog This Is Music named Horas Perdidas as the number one album of the year in Colombia, and the single "Horas Perdidas" was included in the list of new Colombian songs from Shock magazine along with artists like Carlos Vives and J Balvin.

== Members ==
- Camilo Andrés Cárdenas (vocals, guitar)
- Alex González (bass)
- Cristian Galeano (drums)

== Discography ==
Albums

- Horas Perdidas (2018)

EPs

- Draft (2012)
- Stand Out of My Sunlight (2014)

Singles

- "Queens & Drones" / "Nube Blanca" (2016)
- "Humo y TV" (2020)
