= Youth Culture Forever =

Studio album by Paws
- Released: 2 June 2014
- Recorded: Late 2013
- Length: 41:48
- Label: FatCat Records
- Producer: Paws, Jeremy Backofen

Paws chronology
Cokefloat! (2012)	Youth Culture Forever (2014)	No Grace (2016)

Singles from Youth Culture Forever
- 1. "Tongues" Released: February 2014; 2. "Owls Talons Clenching My Heart" Released: April 2014

Youth Culture Forever is the second album by Scottish band Paws. It was released on 2 June 2014 on FatCat Records.

== Background and release ==
Paws' debut album Cokefloat! was released on FatCat Records in October 2012. In spring 2013 bassist Matthew Scott left the band, and Ryan Drever took his place. Paws toured the US and UK extensively in 2013, playing shows with We Were Promised Jetpacks, Frightened Rabbit, Fucked Up, and Little Big League, as well as festivals including SXSW, Seaport Music Festival, and T in the Park.

Youth Culture Forever was recorded in late 2013 in upstate New York. Taylor said that compared to their debut, Paws "wished to spend that little bit more time on emphasising the dynamics in the new songs that we've crafted. Experimenting with new instruments in overdubbing for a touch of depth." He told Spin that "before we just went in and blasted the songs out. But this time it’s been nice to think about placements and stuff." Taylor's vocals were intentionally muffled by recording them on a Talkboy.

Youth Culture Forever was released on CD and LP by FatCat Records on 2 June 2014. In Japan, the album was released on Thomason Sounds, and included the 2012 EP Misled Youth as bonus tracks. The title of the album is a quote from Finn the Human of Adventure Time.

The tracks "Tongues" and "Owls Talons Clenching My Heart" were released as singles in early 2014.

== Critical reception ==
Professional ratings
Aggregate scores
Source	Rating
AnyDecentMusic?	7.0/10
Metacritic	69/100
Review scores
Source	Rating
AllMusic	4/5 stars
Clash	7/10
DIY	4/5 stars
God Is in the TV	3/5
Line of Best Fit	6.5/10
Loud and Quiet	7/10
NME	3.5/5 stars
Pitchfork	7.2/10
The Skinny	4/5 stars
Under the Radar	7/10

On Metacritic the album holds a score of 69/100, based on 7 reviews, indicating a "generally favorable" reception.

Steve Mcgillivray of Louder Than War wrote that "a real standout aspect is Philip Taylor's brutally honest songwriting...this is an album that deserves to be heard widely." Clash called the album "enlivening, inspiring, frustrating and maddening in equal measure", and noted a more raw production compared to their debut. Billy Hamilton of Under the Radar wrote that "while it's hardly adventurous, there's plenty of thrill on offer."

As with Paws' debut Cokefloat!, reviewers noted an influence of 90s grunge on Youth Culture Forever. Jeremy Gorden of Pitchfork wrote that "you can pinpoint PAWS' 90s alt rock influences from a mile away — there's a bit of Mascis, Malkmus, Cuomo, and the like." DIY said that "PAWS haven’t lost their 90s alt-rock sound...but they've beefed it up considerably."

Youth Culture Forever was shortlisted for the 2015 Scottish Album of the Year Award.

== Track listing ==
Youth Culture Forever track listing
No.	Title	Length
1.	"Erreur Humaine"	03:19
2.	"Tongues"	02:13
3.	"Someone New"	02:23
4.	"Owls Talons Clenching My Heart"	03:34
5.	"Give Up"	02:21
6.	"Alone"	03:55
7.	"An Honest Romance"	02:47
8.	"Narcissist"	01:55
9.	"Let's All Let Go"	02:43
10.	"Great Bear"	01:58
11.	"YCF"	02:51
12.	"War Cry"	11:43
Total length:		41:48

Japanese CD release bonus tracks
No.	Title	Length
13.	"BAINZ"	03:16
14.	"The Hospital Song"	01:51
15.	"Linus Van Pelt"	03:10
16.	"Misled Youth"	01:24
17.	"Oh, The Places You'll Go"	03:05

== Personnel ==
Paws

- Phillip Jon Taylor – vocals, guitar, lyrics
- Josh Swinney – drums
- Ryan Drever – bass

Other credits

- Isabel Castellvi – cello on "Erreur Humaine", "Owls Talons Clenching My Heart", and "Alone"
- Adam Pierce – piano on "Tongues"

Technical

- Jeremy Backofen, Paws – production
- Alan Douches – mastering
- Peter Katis – mixing

Artistic

- Jill Collins – illustration
- Gracie Magee, Josh Swinney – photography
