= 180 (album) =

Studio album by Palma Violets
- Released: 25 February 2013
- Genre: Indie rock, garage rock
- Label: Rough Trade
- Producer: Rory Attwell, Steve Mackey

Palma Violets chronology
180 (2013)	Danger in the Club (2015)

Singles from 180
- 1. "Best of Friends" Released: 22 October 2012; 2. "Step Up for the Cool Cats" Released: 10 January 2013; 3. "We Found Love" Released: 29 April 2013

180 is the first studio album by London indie rock group Palma Violets. It was released on 25 February 2013 and follows their debut single "Best of Friends" the previous year, which was selected as 'Best Track Of 2012' by NME magazine.

== Background ==
The album title is taken from the studio in Lambeth, London in which the band often performs. Palma Violets signed to Rough Trade Records in May 2012, a label that features The Libertines, The Strokes and The Smiths as signed artists.

Professional ratings
Aggregate scores
Source	Rating
Metacritic	73/100
Review scores
Source	Rating
Sputnikmusic	2.0/5
Nu.nl	3.5/5
Pitchfork	7/10

== Track listing ==
No.	Title	Length
1.	"Best of Friends"	3:30
2.	"Step Up for the Cool Cats"	3:08
3.	"All the Garden Birds"	3:10
4.	"Rattlesnake Highway"	2:36
5.	"Chicken Dippers"	3:08
6.	"Last of the Summer Wine"	4:09
7.	"Tom the Drum"	2:32
8.	"Johnny Bagga' Donuts"	3:07
9.	"We Found Love"	3:16
10.	"Three Stars"	3:51
11.	"14" (Contains Hidden Track 'Brand New Song')	8:03
