= Rory Attwell =

- Also known as: Raary Decihells, Rory Brattwell, R.O.R.Y. (Result of Reckless Youth).
- Born: Thomas Ronald Attwell; 24 April 1980 (age 46)
- Origin: United Kingdom
- Genres: Indie rock, dance-punk, post-punk
- Instruments: Vocals, guitar, drums
- Labels: Domino, Trouble Records, Marshall Teller Records
- Website: http://www.myspace.com/brattwell

Rory Attwell is an English musician, best known for his part in UK punk trio Test Icicles, who formed in 2004 and played a handful of concerts before disbanding on 22 April 2006, after their sold out final show at the Astoria in London. During their time together they released the album For Screening Purposes Only, and had UK Top 40 singles with "What's Your Damage" and "Circle. Square. Triangle".

== Career ==
After Test Icicles split he went on to form RAT:ATT:AGG (later known as Wrists), with members of Bullet Union, Navajo Code and Abandon Ship. In 2006 they released their debut single "Can We Fix It" on Moshi Moshi records, with a limited run of 1000 7"s. In May 2007 they released an extended EP with demos and radio sessions on the Rallye/Klee label exclusively for the Japanese audience, entitled And on the First Day God Created.... They also provided remixes for bands such as Fake Shark - Real Zombie! and The Kills. However the band announced their official split on 30 November 2007 and offered fans free downloads of their songs. Attwell went on to play drums and guitar in the post punk band KASMs, but he left the band in April 2010.

He is also a notable and sought-after record producer, and under the guise 'Brattwell' has produced recordings for bands including albums for Palma Violets, Big Deal, Stagecoach, Veronica Falls, Let's Wrestle, Sisteray, Evans The Death, and Paws. Other bands produced include S.C.U.M, The Vaccines, Yuck, Mazes, and Male Bonding.

In January 2010 Attwell was named one of five people set to "shape the sound of 2010" by BBC Radio 1 Newsbeat and had a 3-page spread in the music magazine Loud and Quiet.

In December 2010, after his departure from the band Kasms earlier the same year, Attwell announced the release of a solo album, Old Volcanoes. It was released on Marshall Teller Records on 8 August 2011 under the guise Warm Brains, with all compositions performed, written and recorded by Attwell.

In 2012 Attwell produced 180, the debut album by Palma Violets. The songs Attwell produced on the album were favourably compared to bands such as The Libertines.

The debut single "Best of Friends", produced by Attwell earlier that year at Lightship95 Recording studio, was named NME Track of the Year in 2012. The album was released early the following year on Rough Trade Records and charted at Number 11 in the Official UK Top 40.

In 2015 he joined Die! Die! Die!, who were reforming after a 6-month break but had lost bassist Mike Logie. They recorded What Did You Expect, a five-track EP, in a single day in Attwell's recording studio. In December 2015, the Colombian indie rock band AppleTree recorded the double single "Queens & Drones / Nube Blanca" with Attwell in Lightship 95.
