= Semifinalists =

- Origin: London, England, United Kingdom
- Genres: Experimental rock, indie rock
- Years active: 2005–2009
- Label: V2 Records
- Past members: Adriana Alba; Ferry Gouw; Chris Steele-Nicholson
- Website: www.semifinalists.co.uk

Semifinalists were an English indie rock band.

== History ==
Adriana Alba (vocals/keyboards), Ferry Gouw (vocals/guitar) and Chris Steele-Nicholson (vocals/guitar/bass/drums/keyboards) met at London Film School; the group attempted to create a soundtrack for a friend's film. Jamming and experimenting in a rehearsal space from this period brought about the embryonic sounds of the Semifinalists' self-titled debut album.

After signing to V2, their debut album was released on 10 April 2006 on their own label imprint, Regal Bear.

The group recorded the follow-up to their self-titled debut album, entitled 2, which was released 23 June 2008. Alba left the band in spring 2008.

The group toured with Lightspeed Champion in 2008, where Hynes played with the group in place of Alba on occasion.

== Other projects ==
In 2005 Gouw and Steele-Nicholson started a film production company called Muscle and went on to make the video for "I Ain't Saying My Goodbyes" by Tom Vek. Gouw has directed music videos for the latest musical project of Devonte Hynes, the folk-act Lightspeed Champion. Gouw directed the videos for "Galaxy of the Lost" and "Midnight Surprise".

In early 2009, Steele-Nicholson started a new band called Oh Minnows and released the Might EP that year. For Shadows LP was released in 2011.

== Discography ==
Albums

- Semifinalists (2006)
- 2 (2008)

Singles

- "Show the Way" (A side) / "Your Heart" (B side)
- "You Said" (A side) / "Whispering Mice" (B side)
- "DC" (A side) / "Moonlight Bounced" (B side)
- "Odd Situation" (A side) / "Odd Situation - Tapedeck Remix" (B side)
