= Life Is Sweet! Nice to Meet You =

Life is Sweet! Nice to Meet You

Studio album by Lightspeed Champion
- Released: 15 February 2010
- Recorded: 2008–2009; Mission Sound, Brooklyn, New York
- Genre: Indie rock, folk
- Length: 49:50
- Label: Domino
- Producer: Ben Allen, Devonté Hynes

Lightspeed Champion chronology
House-Sitting Songs (2009)	Life is Sweet! Nice to Meet You (2010)

Singles from Life is Sweet! Nice to Meet You
- 1. "Marlene" Released: 25 January 2010; 2. "Madame Van Damme" Released: 10 May 2010

Professional ratings
Aggregate scores
Source	Rating
Metacritic	72/100
Review scores
Source	Rating
AllMusic	4/5 stars
Drowned in Sound	7/10 stars
Rock Sound	8/10 stars
Pitchfork	(6.7/10)
Clash	(8/10)

Life is Sweet! Nice to Meet You is the second album by British artist Lightspeed Champion, released on 15 February 2010 in the UK, and 16 February 2010 in the US, although it was originally to be released on 1 February 2010, before being pushed back.

== Recording ==
The album began recording in late 2008 in Brooklyn with main Lightspeed Champion musician Dev Hynes and producer Ben Allen (known for his recent work with Gnarls Barkley, Animal Collective, and The Constellations), though it soon had to take a hiatus due a throat surgery Dev was required to undertake. It was then tracked within nine days at the beginning of March. Dev periodically posted five "studio reports" on his YouTube channel between 25 December 2008 and 18 March 2009.

"Smooth Day (at the Library)" originally appeared as a track on his EP, Album In A Day 2, then called simply "smooth day".

== Track listing ==
All tracks are written by Devonté Hynes, except where noted.

Standard edition CD (WIGCD235), LP (WIGLP235), digital download (WIG235D)
No.	Title	Length
1.	"Dead Head Blues"	4:07
2.	"Marlene"	3:50
3.	"There's Nothing Underwater"	4:44
4.	"Intermission"	1:23
5.	"Faculty of Fears"	5:14
6.	"The Big Guns of Highsmith"	4:26
7.	"Romart"	3:30
8.	"I Don't Want to Wake Up Alone"	2:29
9.	"Madame Van Damme"	3:13
10.	"Smooth Day (at the Library)"	3:46
11.	"Intermission 2"	0:38
12.	"Sweetheart"	4:38
13.	"Etude Op.3 'Goodnight Michalek'"	1:49
14.	"Middle of the Dark"	4:15
15.	"A Bridge and a Goodbye"	1:47
Total length:		49:50

Japanese edition bonus track
No.	Title	Length
16.	"Tete Morte"	4:21
Total length:		53:11

UK limited edition bonus CD (WIGCD235X)
No.	Title	Length
1.	"Devil in Disguise" (Bill Giant/Bernie Baum/Florence Kaye)	3:05
2.	"Marlene" (live)	4:07
3.	"Madame van Damme" (live)	3:11
4.	"Faculty of Fears" (live)	4:39
5.	"Sweetheart" (live)	4:41

== Release history ==
Date	Country	Label
15 February 2010	United Kingdom	Domino Records (WIG235)
16 February 2010	United States/Canada	Domino Records (DNO254)
24 February 2010	Japan	Hostess Entertainment

== Personnel ==
- Devonté Hynes – vocals, main instrumentation, composition, arrangement
- Spacecamp (Jon Wiley, Steven Mertens, Chris Egan, Omar Shamesh) – additional instrumentation, group male vocals
- Michael Siddel – violin, additional strings
- Jon Webber – violin
- Jesse Reagen – cello
- Sally Wall – oboe
- Ben Allen – production, recording, mixing
