= Danger in the Club =

Studio album by Palma Violets
- Released: 4 May 2015
- Genre: Indie rock, garage rock, punk rock
- Label: Rough Trade
- Producer: John Leckie

Palma Violets chronology
180 (2013)	Danger in the Club (2015)

Singles from Danger in the Club
- 1. "Danger in the Club" Released: 17 February 2015; 2. "English Tongue" Released: 21 April 2015; 3. "Peter and the Gun" Released: 31 July 2015; 4. "The Jacket Song" Released: 20 October 2015; 5. "Coming Over to My Place" Released: 11 January 2016; 6. "Matador" Released: 29 April 2016; 7. "Secrets of America" Released: 25 November 2016

Danger in the Club is the second and final studio album by British rock band Palma Violets. It was released on 4 May 2015 through Rough Trade Records.

== Accolades ==
Publication	Accolade	Year	Rank
Rough Trade	Albums of the Year 2015	2015	20

Professional ratings
Aggregate scores
Source	Rating
Metacritic	64/100
Review scores
Source	Rating
Pitchfork Media	4.5/10
Q	3/5 stars
NME	8/10
The Guardian	4/5 stars
musicOMH	3/5 stars

== Track listing ==
No.	Title	Length
1.	"Sweet Violets"	0:23
2.	"Hollywood (I Got It)"	3:08
3.	"Girl, You Couldn’t Do Much Better on the Beach"	2:03
4.	"Danger in the Club"	3:27
5.	"Coming Over to My Place"	4:10
6.	"Secrets of America"	3:00
7.	"The Jacket Song"	2:56
8.	"Matador"	4:25
9.	"Gout! Gang! Go!"	2:28
10.	"Walking Home"	2:57
11.	"Peter and the Gun"	4:59
12.	"No Money Honey"	3:09
13.	"English Tongue"	3:26
14.	"Five Gold Rings"	3:46
15.	"Man Is Asleep"	3:26
16.	"In the Rain"	2:59
17.	"Scandal"	4:54
