= House-Sitting Songs =

EP by Lightspeed Champion
- Released: 2009
- Genre: Alternative rock, indie, folk
- Length: 27:29
- Producer: Lightspeed Champion

Lightspeed Champion chronology
Album In A Day 2 (2007)	House-Sitting Songs (2009)	Life is Sweet! Nice to Meet You (2010)

House-Sitting Songs is an album of demos released by British artist Lightspeed Champion onto the internet via his MySpace account (before hastily being removed). It was written and recorded in a week while he was house-sitting for a friend.

The album features a duet with Charlotte Froom of The Like on a cover of a Patience and Prudence song, as well as another cover of a song by The Organ.

== Track listing ==
No.	Title	Length
1.	"Tonight You Belong To Me (Patience and Prudence cover, featuring Charlotte Froom)"	1:11
2.	"Saleri's Deposit"	2:13
3.	"Baby Baby Nooooo"	2:56
4.	"Keep Me In The Cold"	2:22
5.	"Never In A Million Years"	2:02
6.	"You Didn't See A Thing"	1:48
7.	"Fire In The Ocean (The Organ cover)"	1:54
8.	"I Can't Wait Anymore"	2:26
9.	"Is This Really Me?"	3:22
10.	"The Ainslie In Us All"	2:08
11.	"Repetititititit"	5:07
