= Pirate studies =

Interdisciplinary field of academic study

Pirate studies is an interdisciplinary field of academic study typically using historical and literary techniques to understand piracy and its cultural connotations.

C.R. Pennell in Who Needs Pirate Heroes? documents the evolution of Pirate Studies. He argues that the first academic historians using properly historical techniques such as archival sources began to examine piracy around the late nineteenth and early twentieth centuries. In this context Penell mentions two works: Stanley Lane-Poole's The Barbary Corsairs (1890) and C.H. Haring's Buccaneers in the West Indies in the Seventeenth Century (1910). But the growth and respectability of the academic study was significantly aided by the work of Professor John Bromley, the British maritime historian. A collection of this work was published as J.S. Bromley, Corsairs and Navies, 1660–1760 (1987). By the end of 1990s much of the work in Pirate studies, Pennell notes, could be grouped under three headings: the economics of piracy, the political and ideological importance of piracy, and women pirates.

== Economics of piracy ==
Key sources on the economics of piracy, documented by Pennell (1998) include the following. An early study by Cyrus Karraker ((1953) Piracy was a Business) where Karraker discusses pirates in terms of contemporary racketeering. Patrick Crowhurst who documented French piracy and David Starkey who discussed British 18th century piracy.

=== Piracy and Entrepreneurship ===
Recent research ventures embarked on links between entrepreneurship and piracy. In this context, the claim is made for a nonmoral approach to piracy as a source of inspiration for entrepreneurship research in general and business model generation in particular.

== Political and ideological importance of piracy ==
Key sources, documented by Pennell (1998) include Barry Burg's (1998) Sodomy and the Pirate Tradition.

== Women pirates ==
Jo Stanley's edited collection (1995) Bold in Her Breeches:Women Pirates across the Ages is listed as the starting point for the study of women and piracy.

== Criticism ==
As an academic subject, Pirate studies has been criticized as embodying or symptomatic of the deep methodological difficulties within the humanities. Rosenthal reports that Pirate studies have been found "to be unsystematic or even anti-systematic". In Pirate studies the Pirates "stumble across genres and straddle multiple ideological possibilities", they lack "stable meaning, but suggest different possibilities at different moments".

== Key sources ==
- Bromley, John S. (1987) Corsairs and Navies, 1660–1760, London: Hambledon

=== Sources on: the economics of Piracy ===
- Karraker, Cyrus Harreld (1953) Piracy was a Business, Rindge
- Crowhurst, Patrick (1989) The French War on Trade:Privateering, 1793-1815 Aldershot
- Starkey, David J. (1990) British Privateering Enterprise in the Eighteenth Century
