= Flamingo Breeze =

Studio album by Matrix Metals
- Released: 2009
- Genres: Hypnagogic pop; lo-fi; chillwave
- Length: 29:06
- Label: Not Not Fun
- Producer: Sam Mehran

Matrix Metals chronology
Flamingo Breeze (2009)	So Unreal (2010)

Sam Mehran chronology
Flashback Repository (2009)	Flamingo Breeze (2009)	Foxy Baby (2009)

Flamingo Breeze is an album by American recording artist Sam Mehran, released under the alias Matrix Metals. The album was originally released in the summer of 2009 by the label Not Not Fun Records.

== Release ==
The album was originally released in the summer of 2009 on cassette tape by the label Not Not Fun Records in a limited quantity of 125 copies. It was later remastered and released in an edition of 500 copies on vinyl LP, as well as digital download by the label Olde English Spelling Bee.

Two music videos were released to promote the re-release on OESB. A music video for "Flamingo Breeze, Part 4", directed by Ivan Gaytan was released on January 25, 2010, followed by a video for "Tanning Salon, Part 2", directed by Luke Wyatt on January 29.

== Composition ==
Flamingo Breeze is a lo-fi hypnagogic pop album built on synthesizer loops. The album consists of three long tracks (Note: The tracks are split into parts on the digital release.), with sudden switches in mood and tempo. Selim Bulut of Dazed Digital described the album as using repetition to create a "startlingly strange effect" and being "eerie and hypnotic, and spiritually psychedelic". David Keenan called the album "alien lounge music" and "hypnagogic kosmische" and noted the influence of "1980s soundtrack styles" and textures of "brain-fogging static".

== Track listing ==
All tracks are written by Sam Mehran.

Side A
No.	Title	Length
1.	"Flamingo Breeze, Part 1"	3:49
2.	"Flamingo Breeze, Part 2"	4:14
3.	"Flamingo Breeze, Part 3"	1:57
4.	"Flamingo Breeze, Part 4"	4:50

Side B
No.	Title	Length
5.	"Ray Ban Meltdown, Part 1"	4:39
6.	"Ray Ban Meltdown, Part 2"	2:17
7.	"Tanning Salon, Part 1"	3:25
8.	"Tanning Salon, Part 2"	3:56

== Reception ==
Professional ratings
Review scores
Source	Rating
The Wire	(favourable)

Marc Masters of the music magazine The Wire described the album as a "mini-masterpiece of sub-disco loops", and "like a memory so vivid it almost feels real". The album was named the 31st best album of the year by Tiny Mix Tapes, with reviewer Tyler Craig praising the simple, nostalgic loop-based formula and describing it as "the perfect soundtrack to the shittiest summer of your life".
