= Semifinalists (album) =

Studio album by Semifinalists
- Released: 10 April 2006
- Recorded: Plant Studios; The Ice House, San Francisco
- Genre: Experimental rock Indie rock indietronica
- Label: V2 Records, Columbia Records
- Producer: Chris Steele-Nicholson

Semifinalists chronology
Semifinalists (2006)	2 (2008)

Promo cover
- Promo album cover

Professional ratings
Review scores
Source	Rating
Stylus Magazine	B− link

Semifinalists is the eponymous debut album by British indie band Semifinalists, which was released on April 10, 2006.

== Personnel ==
- Adriana Alba
- Ferry Gouw
- Chris Steele-Nicholson

== Album credits ==
- Written by Semifinalists
- Produced by Chris Steele-Nicholson
- Engineered by Scott Steiner
- Mixed by Chris Steele-Nicholson and Scott Steiner
- Mastered by Adam Ayan at Gateway Mastering
- Cover Design by Semifinalists
- Artwork by Ferry Gouw

== Track listing ==
- CD B000E5KJT8 (UK),B000FGG2K6 (US)
1. Origin Song
2. Show The Way
3. The Chemicals That Wait
4. Lets Kill This
5. You Said
6. D.C.
7. A Short Acoustic Song
8. Hwy. 101
9. I Saw You In The Hall
10. Upstream
11. Whispering Mice
12. From Several To Many
