= Dumb Blood =

Studio album by Vant
- Released: 17 February 2017
- Recorded: 2015–16
- Studio: Fish Factory Studios, London; Red Bull Studios, London; Angelic Studios, London; Hits & Art
- Genre: Indie rock, punk rock
- Length: 41:40
- Label: Parlophone
- Producer: Sam Miller

Vant chronology
| Karma Seeker (2016) | Dumb Blood (2017) | Talk Like Thunder (2017) |

Singles from Dumb Blood
- 1. "Parasite" Released: 22 April 2015; 2. "The Answer" Released: 29 July 2015; 3. "Parking Lot" Released: 30 September 2015; 4. "Fly-By Alien" Released: 10 February 2016; 5. "Karma Seeker" Released: 21 June 2016; 6. "Peace & Love" Released: 11 October 2016; 7. "Do You Know Me?" Released: 1 January 2017

Dumb Blood is the debut studio album by indie rock band Vant. The album, produced by Sam Miller, was released on 17 February 2017 by Parlophone. A deluxe edition of the album was simultaneously released featuring tracks from the band's "Karma Seeker" EP, B-sides and previously un-released songs.

== Background ==
Vant formed in London in 2014. The band met in a Death Metal Club in London where they had moved to pursue music. The band took heavy influence from global issues such as "equality, education and the environment". Front man Mattie aimed to make music with messages behind them feeling that it was lost in Rock music and something only found in Hip-Hop. He cites The Clash, Neil Young, Nina Simone, M.I.A. and Bob Dylan as artists who inspired him cause they stood for what they believed in. The band self-released their debut single, the double A side, "Parasite/Do You Know Me?" on 22 April 2015. Shortly after its release the band signed to Parlophone Records and received extensive airplay from BBC Radio 1, XFM and Amazing Radio. Zane Lowe made the band his "Next Hype" and played "Parasite" 3 times in one show. Their following singles "The Answer", "Parking Lot", "Fly-By Alien", "Karma Seeker" and "Peace & Love" were all debuted on BBC Radio 1 as Annie Mac's 'Hottest Record in the World'. "Dumb Blood" was announced on Annie Mac's show after the premiere of "Peace & Love" on 11 October 2016.

== Critical reception ==
Professional ratings
Aggregate scores
| Source | Rating |
|---|---|
| Metacritic | 69/100 |
Review scores
| Source | Rating |
| Rock Sound | 6/10 |
| The Times | 3/5 stars |
| Kerrang! | 8/10 |
| Q | 8/10 |
| The Guardian | 1/5 stars |
| AllMusic | 3.5/5 stars |

Dumb Blood received mixed reviews from music critics. At Metacritic, which assigns a normalized rating out of 100 to reviews from mainstream critics, the album received an average score of 69, based on 6 reviews.

== Track listing ==
All lyrics are written by Mattie Vant; all music is composed by Mattie Vant and Henry Eastman

| No. | Title | Length |
|---|---|---|
| 1. | "The Answer" | 2:48 |
| 2. | "Put Down Your Gun" | 3:29 |
| 3. | "Peace & Love" | 3:24 |
| 4. | "Lampoon" | 3:01 |
| 5. | "Parking Lot" | 2:51 |
| 6. | "Do You Know Me?" | 2:34 |
| 7. | "I Don't Believe in God" | 3:25 |
| 8. | "Fly-By Alien" | 2:29 |
| 9. | "Headed for the Sun" | 2:20 |
| 10. | "Parasite" | 1:25 |
| 11. | "Are We Free?" | 7:07 |
| 12. | "Karma Seeker" | 3:55 |
| 13. | "Time & Money" | 2:52 |
| Total length: | | 41:40 |

Deluxe edition
| No. | Title | Length |
|---|---|---|
| 1. | "The Answer" | 2:48 |
| 2. | "Put Down Your Gun" | 3:29 |
| 3. | "Peace & Love" | 3:24 |
| 4. | "Lampoon" | 3:01 |
| 5. | "Parking Lot" | 2:51 |
| 6. | "Do You Know Me?" | 2:34 |
| 7. | "Freedom of Movement" | 1:56 |
| 8. | "I Don't Believe in God" | 3:25 |
| 9. | "(Transmission)" | 0:51 |
| 10. | "Fly-By Alien" | 2:29 |
| 11. | "Headed for the Sun" | 2:20 |
| 12. | "Parasite" | 1:25 |
| 13. | "Are We Free?" | 7:07 |
| 14. | "Karma Seeker" | 3:55 |
| 15. | "Time & Money" | 2:52 |
| 16. | "Peace & Love (Reprise)" | 2:44 |
| 17. | "Welcome to the Wonderful World of Berners Lee" | 1:40 |
| 18. | "Mess Around" | 2:14 |
| 19. | "Birth Certificate" | 2:51 |
| 20. | "Bribe Me to My Grave" | 0:23 |
| 21. | "All Our Babies" | 2:41 |
| 22. | "Holy Water" | 1:24 |
| Total length: | | 57:57 |

== Personnel ==
Adapted from the album's liner notes.

Vant

- Mattie Vant – lead vocals, guitar, bass guitar, keyboards
- Henry Eastman – guitar, backing vocals, bass guitar
- Billy Morris – bass guitar
- David 'Greenie' Green – drums and percussion.

=== Additional musicians ===
- Sam Miller – Percussion on "The Answer", "Peace & Love", "Do You Know Me?", "Headed for the Sun", "Karma Seeker", "Time & Money", "Mess Around", "Birth Certificate", "All Our Babies" and "Holy Water", keyboards on "Put Down Your Gun" and synthesizers on "Peace & Love", "Karma Seeker", "Time & Money", "Birth Certificate".
- Martin Söderin – drums on "The Answer", "Parking Lot", "I Don't Believe in God" and "Mess Around"
- Henry Bennett – drums on "Do You Know Me?", "Headed for the Sun", "Parasite" and "Birth Certificate".

=== Production ===
- Sam Miller – production and mixing
- Martin Brammer – co-producer on "Do You Know Me?" and "Parasite"
- Rich Costey – mixing on "The Answer"
- Howie Weinberg – mastering
- Gentry Studer – mastering
- LANDR – mastering on "Parking Lot"
- John Davis – mastering on "Do You Know Me?" and "Parasite"

=== Design ===
- Mattie Vant – art direction, design
- Richard Welland – art direction, design
- Steve Gullick – photography

== Charts ==
| Chart (2017) | Peak position |
|---|---|
| Belgian Albums (Ultratop Flanders) | 155 |
| Dutch Albums (Album Top 100) | 185 |
| Scottish Albums (OCC) | 64 |
| UK Albums (OCC) | 46 |
