= John Selwyn Bromley =

British navy historian

- Born: 1913
- Died: 17 April 1985 (aged 71–72); Southampton, England
- Education: Bedford School, New College, Oxford
- Scientific career
- Fields: Historian
- Workplaces: University of Oxford, University of Southampton

Professor John Selwyn Bromley (1913 – 17 April 1985), was a prominent British Naval Historian.

== Biography ==
Born in 1913, John Selwyn Bromley was educated at Bedford School and at New College, Oxford. He joined the Civil Service and was Private Secretary to the Financial Secretary to the Treasury between 1941 and 1946. He was Fellow in Modern History at Keble College, Oxford, between 1947 and 1960, and Professor of Modern History at the University of Southampton, between 1960 and 1977. He published widely and is best known for Volume VI of the New Cambridge Modern History, published in 1970.

Professor John Selwyn Bromley died in Southampton on 17 April 1985, aged 71.

== Publications ==
- Corsairs and Navies, 1660–1760, 1987
- The Clockmakers' Library : the catalogue of the books and manuscripts in the library of the Worshipful Company of Clockmakers, 1977
- Britain and the Netherlands, Volume V, Some Political Mythologies : papers delivered to the fifth Anglo-Dutch Historical Conference [held at the University of Southampton, September, 1973], 1975
- The Manning of the Royal Navy : selected public pamphlets, 1693-1873, 1974-1976
- Statesmen, Scholars and Merchants : essays in eighteenth-century history presented to Dame Lucy Sutherland, 1973
- New Cambridge Modern History - Volume VI - The Rise of Great Britain and Russia, 1688-1715, 1970
- Metropolis, Dominion and Province : papers delivered to the Fourth Anglo-Dutch Historical Conference, 1969
- Britain and the Netherlands in Europe and Asia : papers delivered to the third Anglo-Dutch Historical Conference, 1968
- William III and Louis XIV : Essays 1680-1720, 1968
- Britain and the Netherlands : Papers delivered to the Anglo-Dutch Historical Conference, 1962, 1964
- History and the Younger Generation : an inaugural lecture delivered at the University on 28th November, 1961, 1962
- The Armorial Bearings of the Guilds of London : a record of the heraldry of the surviving companies with historical notes, 1960
- Britain and the Netherlands : papers delivered to the Oxford-Netherlands Historical Conference, 1959, 1960
- The Man of Ten Talents : A Portrait of Richard Chenevix Trench, 1807-86; Philologist, Poet, Theologian, Archbishop, 1959
- A Select List of Works on Europe and Europe Overseas, 1715-1815, 1956-1974
