= I Wrote and Recorded This in Less Than Five Hours =

EP by Lightspeed Champion
- Released: August 2007
- Recorded: 2007
- Genre: Indie, folk
- Length: 21:11

Lightspeed Champion chronology
Bad Covers EP (2007)	I Wrote and Recorded This in Less Than Five Hours (2007)	Garageband Xmas EP (2007)

I Wrote and Recorded This in Less Than Five Hours is an official bootleg album by UK based artist Lightspeed Champion and, as the title says, was written and recorded in less than five hours in his flat after returning from the V Festival and having a musical buzz. When asked in an interview "Are projects like I Wrote and Recorded This In Less Than Five Hours something you intend to keep up? Or was it just for fun?", Champion responded

Both. I do it almost every day when I’m not touring or busy. I tend to either show no one or like two people. If you imagine someone plays football, and they play games against their garage door every day, it’s kinda like that. Ha ha.

== Track listing ==
No.	Title	Length
1.	"Onedayrecord1"	1:52
2.	"Onedayrecord2"	3:16
3.	"Onedayrecord3"	1:56
4.	"Onedayrecord4"	2:15
5.	"Onedayrecord5"	1:44
6.	"Onedayrecord5andahalf"	1:58
7.	"Onedayrecord6"	2:34
8.	"Onedayrecord7"	2:06
9.	"Onedayrecord8"	2:14
10.	"Onedayrecord9"	1:16
