= Real Gold =

British music and arts brand

- Product type: Merchandise; Recorded music Events; Print publishing Arts spaces
- Country: United Kingdom
- Website: wearerealgold.com

Real Gold is a British music and arts brand established in London in Summer 2006.

The brand operates across various industries including recorded music, event promotion, print publishing and merchandising. It is commonly associated with the hospitality sector, having opened The Alibi, and Pamela bar in Dalston, Five Miles in Seven Sisters and more.

There is a heavy use of cataloguing with all the brand's output very similar to that of Factory Records.

== History ==
The brand was founded by Dean 'Deano Jo' Joannides. The first incarnation of Real Gold was that of a DJ collective, before evolving into a more focused event promotion organisation. Real Gold began creating merchandise that showcased various types of creative talent, which were labelled as 'Releases', most commonly taking the form of t-shirts, vinyl records and fanzines.

With early Real Gold associates becoming known independently in their own respective careers (see Collaborators), in 2009 the brand evolved into the working alias for Deano Jo and enveloped most of his entrepreneurial work.

Deano Jo was listed in The Independent's 2009 feature on 'The 15 people who will define the future of arts in Britain' and profiled in Dazed & Confuzed's article on the world's most inspiring young entrepreneurs.

== Collaborators ==
Early members and frequent collaborators include photographer Ben Rayner, creative director Ronojoy Dam, art director Ben Freeman, chef Gabriel Pryce, artist Lewis Teague Wright and many more.

Real Gold worked with musicians Adele, Florence and the Machine and Laura Marling at early stages in their careers.

In 2017 they commissioned and presented 'The Best of Risky Roadz' at Rio Cinema, Dalston and The Mockingbird Cinema, Birmingham.

In 2020 they presented the debut art exhibition for musician Frank Carter.

== Associated Businesses and Organisations ==
=== Current ===
° Love Brother
° Pamela
° Sweeney
° Thug Nation
° Yeah Boi!

=== Previously ===
° The Alibi
° Birthdays
° Five Miles
° Future Artefacts
° Rita's

== Releases ==
Catalogue Number	Title	Year
RG0001A	"Halloween" T-shirt by Jack Bechtler	2006
RG0002A	"Turkish Gold" T-shirt by Kate Moross and Georgia-Rose Fairman (collaboration with Young Turks)	2006
RG0003A	"We Got Your Back" T-shirt by Ted Lovett and Ben Rayner	2006
RG0004A	"Real Gs Mixtape" CD by Team Mega Mix	2007
RG0005A	"Romancing The Bottle" 7 inch by The Train Chronicles	2007
RG0006A	"Waterparks" T-shirt by Jack Bechtler	2008
RG0007A	Sticker Pack 1	2009
RG0008A	Poster Set 1	2009
RG0009A	"Don't Forget The Struggle, Don't Forget The Streets" T-shirt	2010
RG0010A	"Real Gold Photographers' Senate - 01" Zine	2011
RG0011A	"Real Gold Photographers' Senate - 02' Zine	2011
RG0012A	"Real Bold" T-Shirt designed by Nick Richie (collaboration with Bold Tendencies)	2011
RG0013A	"The Alibi Faces" T-Shirt by Ted Pearce	2012
RG0014A	"Fight Back" T-Shirt	2012
RG0015A	"Mass Movement" T-Shirt (collaboration with T-Shirt Party)	2012
RG0016A	"06" T-Shirt by Lucas Donaud	2012
RG0017A	"Hatred Alone Is Immortal" (Black) T-Shirt by Dylan Hughes	2013
RG0017B	"Hatred Alone Is Immortal" (White) T-Shirt by Dylan Hughes	2013
RG0018A	“Know We” T-Shirt	2013
RG0019A	James Pearson-Howes x Tim Head "Cerebus" T-Shirt	2014
RG0019B	James Pearson-Howes x Tim Head "London Lad" T-Shirt	2014
RG0019C	James Pearson-Howes x Tim Head "Pink Sky" T-Shirt	2014
RG0020A	"Larger Than Life, Twice As Ugly" Zine by Louie Jenkins	2014
RG0021A	"The Alibi 5th Birthday" Zine	2015
RG0022A	"Dalston Squad" Badge by Rob Whoriskey	2015
RG0023A	"X years in London" Video by Joe Ridout	2016
RGo\o	"X years in London OST" Cassette Tape by Braiden (collaborative release with Off Out)	2016
RG0024A	Poundlandbandit "Memes About Ket Fiends" Zine by poundlandbandit	2017
RG0025A	"The Alibi Women" T-Shirt by Ted Pearce	2018
RG0026A	"Takeaways" Zine by Rae Chen Elliman	2024
RG0027A	"Palestine: Khawa" Zine by BB and Jorj Goss	2025

== Events ==
=== Main Event Series ===
° RGEVENT
° RGCOLLAB
° RGDJ

=== Other Event Series ===
° Cough / Cool
° North Angel
° Rich History
° The Golden Gloves
° The International Amalgamation of Champions

=== RGEVENT ===
Catalogue Number	Title	Year
RGEVENT0001	"A Large Party"	2006
RGEVENT0002	"A Fucked Up New Year"	2006
RGEVENT0003	"Goldtube"	2007
RGEVENT0004	"The Train Chronicles Release Show"	2007
RGEVENT0005	"The Train Chronicles"	2007
RGEVENT0006	"Cheeseburger Pool Party"	2007
RGEVENT0007	"A Larger Party"	2008
RGEVENT0008	"Suedeheads"	2008
RGEVENT0009	"Every Man For Himself"	2009
RGEVENT0010	"RIP Roger / Larry Troutman"	2009
RGEVENT0011	"Real Gold's 3rd Birthday"	2009
RGEVENT0012	"New Year's Eve"	2009
RGEVENT0013	"1-800 Mega Death "	2010
RGEVENT0014	"Real Gold Photographers Senate Edition One"	2011
RGEVENT0015	"The Alibi's First Birthday"	2011
RGEVENT0016	"Real Gold Photographers Senate Edition Two"	2011
RGEVENT0017	"Real Bold 1"	2011
RGEVENT0018	"Aaliyah - 10 Years Gone"	2011
RGEVENT0019	"Real Gold - Five"	2011
RGEVENT0020	"One Night Stand"	2011
RGEVENT0021	"The Alibi’s 2nd Birthday"	2012
RGEVENT0022	"Magnitude"	2012
RGEVENT0023	"6th Birthday Party - NTS Takeover"	2012
RGEVENT0024	"6th Birthday Party"	2012
RGEVENT0025	"The Alibi 3rd Birthday"	2013
RGEVENT0026	"XX By XXXVI"	2013
RGEVENT0027	"The Alibi 4th Birthday"	2014
RGEVENT0028	"Real Gold Summer Jam"	2014
RGEVENT0029	"Larger Than Life, Twice As Ugly"	2014
RGEVENT0030	"DJ Funk"	2014
RGEVENT0031	"DJ Q"	2014
RGEVENT0032	"The Alibi 5th Birthday"	2015
RGEVENT0033	"The Alibi 6th Birthday"	2016
RGEVENT0034	"Pammy's First Birthday"	2016
RGEVENT0035	"Show Me The Body"	2016
RGEVENT0036	"X years in London"	2016
RGEVENT0037	"10 Years"	2016
RGEVENT0038	"The Alibi 7th Birthday"	2017
RGEVENT0039	"Five Miles Launch Party"	2017
RGEVENT0040	"The Best of Risky Roadz"	2017
RGEVENT0041	"The Best of Risky Roadz : Birmingham"	2017
RGEVENT0042	"PoundlandBandit - Memes About Ket Fiends"	2017
RGEVENT0043	"The Alibi Women T-Shirt Launch Party"	2018
RGEVENT0044	"The Alibi 8th Birthday"	2018
RGEVENT0045	"Real Gold Summer Jam"	2018
RGEVENT0046	"REAL GOLD UK Garage Jam - Summer Block Party"	2019
RGEVENT0047	"Real Gold 15th Birthday - Next 15"	2021

=== RGCOLLAB ===
Catalogue Number	Title	Year
RGCOLLAB0001	"Best Window" with BEST	2006
RGCOLLAB0002	"Chalk" with Chalk Club	2006
RGCOLLAB0003	"Turkish Gold" with Young Turks	2006
RGCOLLAB0004	"New Kids On The Yacht 1" with Young Turks & Team Mega Mix	2006
RGCOLLAB0005	"New Kids On The Yacht 2" with Young Turks & Team Mega Mix	2006
RGCOLLAB0006	"Louis Enchante & Friends" with Louise Enchante	2006
RGCOLLAB0007	"Young and Lost" with Young and Lost Club	2006
RGCOLLAB0008	"Silver and Gold" with Silverspoon Attire	2006
RGCOLLAB0009	"Wallfly" with This Is Music	2009
RGCOLLAB0010	"Bold Tendencies 5 Launch" with Bold Tendencies	2011
RGCOLLAB0011	"Mass Movement" with T-Shirt Party	2012
RGCOLLAB0012	"Live Evil" with Live Evil Festival	2014
RGCOLLAB0013	"10 Years — Dinner" with Nike 1948	2016
RGCOLLAB0014	"Liam Hodges" with Liam Hodges	2017
RGCOLLAB0015	"Off Out" with Off Out Records	2017
RGCOLLAB0016	"Daytime Party Fun Day Awesome Fest #2" with Five Miles	2018
RGCOLLAB0017	"Five Miles NYE" with Five Miles	2018
RGCOLLAB0018	"Lucky 13th Birthday Dinner" with Hennessy	2019
RGCOLLAB0019	"900 Days of Chaos" with Frank Carter	2020

=== RGDJ ===
Catalogue Number	Title	Year
RGDJ0001	"Gabriel's Leaving"	2006
RGDJ0002	"Troubled Minds"	2006
RGDJ0003	"1-800 Mega Mix Battle 1"	2006
RGDJ0004	"Dummy Sunday"	2006
RGDJ0005	"Socks Off"	2006
RGDJ0006	"1-800 Mega Mix Battle 2	2006
RGDJ0007	"Four Years Of Vice Magazine"	2006
RGDJ0008	"Anna Su"	2006
RGDJ0009	"Fucked Up"	2006
RGDJ0010	"People Are Germs"	2007
RGDJ0011	"So In Love"	2007
RGDJ0012	"The Do Club"	2007
RGDJ0013	"Push"	2007
RGDJ0014	"Haiti Fundraiser"	2010
RGDJ0015	"Dazed Live"	2011
