= Circle. Square. Triangle =

Single by Test Icicles

from the album For Screening Purposes Only
- B-side: "LMNO Hoes"
- Released: 24 October 2005
- Recorded: 2005
- Genre: Dance-punk, indie rock
- Length: 3:02
- Label: Domino
- Songwriter(s): Sam Mehran, Rory Attwell, Devonte Hynes
- Producer(s): James Ford

Test Icicles singles chronology
"Boa vs. Python" (2005)	"Circle. Square. Triangle" (2005)	"What's Your Damage" (2006)

"Circle. Square. Triangle" is a song by Test Icicles which was released as the second single from their debut album For Screening Purposes Only on 24 October 2005. The song is their most successful having peaked at No. 25 on the UK Singles Chart.

== Track listing ==
CD: Domino / DNO 76 - UK

No.	Title	Length
1.	"Circle. Square. Triangle"	3:02
2.	"What's in the Box"	3:04
3.	"Circle. Square. Triangle" (MC Lars Extended Mix)	6:27
4.	"Circle. Square. Triangle" (James Ford Full Length Mix)	4:56

7": Domino / RUG210 - UK

No.	Title	Length
1.	"Circle. Square. Triangle"	3:02
2.	"LMNO Hoes"	1:17

12": Domino / DNO 76 - U.S.

No.	Title	Length
1.	"Circle. Square. Triangle" (James Ford Full Length Mix)	4:56
2.	"Circle. Square. Triangle" (James Ford Full Length Instrumental)	4:56
3.	"Circle. Square. Triangle" (MC Lars Extended Mix)	6:27
4.	"Circle. Square. Triangle" (Chrome Hoof Remix)

Digital download: Domino

No.	Title	Length
1.	"Circle. Square. Triangle"	3:02
2.	"LMNO Hoes"	1:17

Digital download: Domino

No.	Title	Length
1.	"Circle. Square. Triangle" (James Ford Radio Edit)	3:04
2.	"Circle. Square. Triangle" (MC Lars Radio Edit)	3:18

Digital download: Domino

No.	Title	Length
1.	"Circle. Square. Triangle"	3:02
2.	"What's in the Box"	3:04
3.	"Circle. Square. Triangle" (MC Lars Extended Mix)	6:27
4.	"Circle. Square. Triangle" (James Ford Full Length Mix)	4:56

== Charts ==
Charts (2005)	Peak position
UK Singles Chart	25
