= Falling Off the Lavender Bridge =

Falling off the Lavender Bridge

Studio album by Lightspeed Champion
- Released: 21 January 2008
- Recorded: 2007
- Studios: ARC Studios, Omaha, Nebraska
- Genres: Indie rock, folk
- Length: 43:00
- Label: Domino
- Producer: Mike Mogis

Lightspeed Champion chronology
Garageband Xmas EP (2007)	Falling off the Lavender Bridge (2008)	Album in a Day 2 (2008)

Singles from Falling off the Lavender Bridge
- 1. "Galaxy of the Lost" Released: 16 July 2007; 2. "Midnight Surprise" Released: 15 October 2007; 3. "Tell Me What It's Worth" Released: 14 January 2008; 4. "Galaxy of the Lost (Re-Release)" Released: 12 May 2008

Professional ratings
Aggregate scores
Source	Rating
Metacritic	70/100
Review scores
Source	Rating
AllMusic	3/5 stars
Drowned in Sound	6/10
NME	9/10
Pitchfork	6.3/10
PopMatters	6/10

Falling off the Lavender Bridge is the debut album by British artist Lightspeed Champion, which was released on 21 January 2008. The album features the singles "Galaxy of the Lost", "Midnight Surprise" and "Tell Me What It's Worth".

== Recording ==
Devonté Hynes, the main musician in Lightspeed Champion, flew to Omaha, Nebraska in early 2007 to flesh out the songs that he'd written with Mike Mogis, resident producer for Saddle Creek records and a member of Bright Eyes. He stayed there for several months in a guest house decorated by Mogis and Conor Oberst. An assortment of musicians came around to hang out and ended up playing on the record including Mogis himself, trumpet player and pianist Nate Walcott, The Faint's drummer Clark Baechle and guest vocalist Emmy the Great—along with moonlighting members of Cursive and Tilly and the Wall.

According to Hynes, the album is in two-halves; a mixture of his dreams and life experiences. The lavender in the album title refers to a toy frog (made from lavender) Hynes' mother gave to him as a child to help him sleep.

== Track listing ==
CD WIGCD186, LP WIGLP186
No.	Title	Length
1.	"Number One"	0:25
2.	"Galaxy of the Lost"	3:58
3.	"Tell Me What It's Worth"	2:41
4.	"All to Shit"	1:12
5.	"Midnight Surprise"	9:56
6.	"Devil Tricks for a Bitch"	4:40
7.	"I Could Have Done This Myself"	3:26
8.	"Salty Water"	2:26
9.	"Dry Lips"	3:46
10.	"Everyone I Know Is Listening to Crunk"	3:03
11.	"Let the Bitches Die"	2:38
12.	"No Surprise (for Wendela)/Midnight Surprise"	5:06

Limited Edition Acoustic Bonus Disc
No.	Title	Length
1.	"Never Meant to Hurt You" (Good Shoes cover)	3:29
2.	"Souvenirs" (Patrick Wolf cover)	3:08
3.	"Flesh Failures" (from the musical Hair)	4:05
4.	"Xanadu" (Olivia Newton-John cover)	3:46

== Notes ==
Hynes claims "I Could Have Done This Myself" is "about losing [his] virginity" going on to state, "which is why it's called I Could Have Done This Myself. I later realised that it was actually referring to the second time I had sex; the first time was so traumatic I'd just blanked it out of my memory."

"Dry Lips" describes the last time Hynes - who has to lead a relatively sober life because of stomach ulcers - had a hangover.

The 'Wendela' mentioned in the name of the final track ("No Surprise (For Wendela)") is a reference to Hynes' mother.

== Personnel ==
- Devonté Hynes - vocals, guitar
- Emmy the Great - additional vocals (tracks 1, 2, 3, 9, 10, 11, 12)
- Tim Kasher - additional vocals (track 3)
- Derek Pressnall, Kianna Alarid, Susan Sanchez, David Coyote Bones, Nik Fackler, Joe Knapp - group vocals (tracks 7, 12)
- Clark Baechle - drums
- Kimberley Salistean, Cynthia Ricker, Donna Carnes and Tracy Sands - strings
- Nate Walcott - strings arrangement
- Tom Clarke - cello
- Miguel Picanco - oboe
- Mark Benson - clarinet
- Karen Murphy - flute
- Mike Mogis - producer, mixer, engineer

== Charts ==
Chart (2008)	Peak position
UK Albums Chart	45
French Albums Chart	105
