= Tell Me What It's Worth =

2008 single by Dev Hynes

Single by Lightspeed Champion

from the album Falling Off the Lavender Bridge
- Released: 14 January 2008
- Recorded: 2007
- Genre: Folk
- Length: 2:41
- Label: Domino
- Songwriter: Devonte Hynes
- Producer: Mike Mogis

Lightspeed Champion singles chronology
"Midnight Surprise" (2007)	"Tell Me What It's Worth" (2008)	"Galaxy of the Lost" (2008)

Music video
- "Tell Me What It's Worth" on YouTube

"Tell Me What It's Worth" is the third single from Lightspeed Champion's debut album Falling Off the Lavender Bridge, released on CD and 7" vinyl by Domino Records on 14 January 2008.

The lyrics of the song concern the verbal abuse lead singer Devonte Hynes' receives from other black people; "The only racial hatred I ever get walking down the street in Dalston is from rude boys. It's really weird."

It entered the UK Singles Chart at #72

== Track listing ==
7" #1 RUG260T
No.	Title	Writer(s)	Length
1.	"Tell Me What It's Worth"	Devonte Hynes	2:42
2.	"Tristan"	Patrick Wolf	2:25

7" #2 RUG273X
No.	Title	Writer(s)	Length
1.	"Tell Me What It's Worth"	Devonte Hynes	2:42
2.	"Xanadu"	Jeff Lynne	3:47

CD RUG260T
No.	Title	Writer(s)	Length
1.	"Tell Me What It's Worth"	Devonte Hynes	2:42
2.	"Back To Black"	Amy Winehouse/Mark Ronson	3:50
