= Test Icicles =

English rock band

- Origin: London, England
- Genres: Dance-punk; new rave; sasscore; post-hardcore; indie rock
- Years active: 2004–2006
- Label: Domino
- Past members: Sam Mehran; Rory Attwell; Dev Hynes
- Website: Myspace.com/testicicles

Test Icicles were an English rock band from London, active from 2004 to 2006. The band consisted of Rory Attwell, Dev Hynes and Sam Mehran.

Influenced by dance-punk, indie rock and post-hardcore, the band was formed when Hynes and Mehran were both 18. They released one album, For Screening Purposes Only, in 2005. Two of its singles, "Circle. Square. Triangle" and "What's Your Damage", reached the top 40 of the UK singles chart.

Following the band's split, Hynes earned further recognition for his solo project Blood Orange.

== History ==
Prior to forming the band, Attwell, Hynes and Mehran (all of whom shared vocal and guitar duties) had met each other through mutual friends. The trio's preference for the same nightspots (such as the Afterskool night club, in London) also led to frequent meet-ups. Initially the band formed under the moniker Balls with Ferry Gouw, who shortly after went on to form Semifinalists, effectively in the role Hynes eventually filled. Gouw left the band for an extended trip to Indonesia, at which time Attwell and Mehran recruited Hynes and changed the band name to Test Icicles, the new band name also being a suggestion from Gouw.

All three members of the group were involved in numerous, short-lived musical projects before the forming of Test Icicles.

== Split ==
In February 2006, the band announced they were splitting up.

On 26 April 2006 the band released Dig Your Own Grave, an EP meant as a farewell from the band. It featured a CD with remixes and unreleased tracks, and a DVD with the band's music videos.

== Post-Test Icicles ==
After the band split, the individual members continued to stay active, becoming involved in a number of side projects between them.

Mehran was believed to have moved back to America after the split and claimed to have been spotted working in a record store in New York.

In July 2018, Mehran was found dead in his Hollywood home due to suicide, just after completing work on a planned solo album. Hynes paid tribute to him on Instagram, saying, “Every time I was with you we were 17 again. You were such a gift to this world. The floor has gone and I don’t know where to stand. RIP.”

== Members ==
- Rory Attwell (aka Raary Deci-hells, Raary Rambert RAT ATT AGG, Rory Brattwell) English (born in London, England) — guitar and vocals
- Sam Mehran (aka Sam E Danger, Sam E Slaughter) American (born in Miami, moved to Adelaide, Australia, then to New York City before moving to England) — vocals and guitar (died July 2018)
- Devonté Hynes (aka Dev Metal, !Ved) English (born in London, England) — guitar, keyboards and vocals

=== Touring members ===
- Adam Bainbridge (aka DJ Jitset) English (Born in Peterborough, England) — DJ

== Equipment ==
- Rory Attwell (Guitars - Wilson Bros. Venture VM-75, Fender '72 Deluxe Telecaster)
- Devonté Hynes (Guitars - Squier HH Showmaster (hot pink), Aria II Pro ZZ Deluxe, and in earlier shows, he used a Telecaster copy).
- Sam Mehran (Guitars - Les Paul Deluxe copy, Peavey Raptor)

Amps - All three of the members would switch guitar duties, usually sharing the same amps. They usually used a Peavey Valveking 1x12, a small Trace Elliot combo, or a Fender Hot Rod deluxe.

Keyboard - Dev used a Korg Microkorg.

Effects - It is hard to see which effects they used, but one picture shows an Electro Harmonix WORM modulation pedal, which is probably responsible for the ring modulation effect in the song "Boa vs. Python". In an interview they claimed to use the same effects as nu-metal group KoЯn.

== Discography ==
=== Studio albums ===
- For Screening Purposes Only (31 October 2005) #69 UK

=== Singles and EPs ===
| Year | Title | UK | UK Indie | Album |
|---|---|---|---|---|
| 2005 | "Boa vs. Python" | 46 | 5 | For Screening Purposes Only |
| 2005 | "Circle. Square. Triangle" | 25 | 3 | For Screening Purposes Only |
| 2006 | "What's Your Damage" | 31 | 9 | For Screening Purposes Only |
| 2006 | "Boa vs. Python (Grime Remixes)" | - | - | Boa vs. Python (Grime Remixes) |
| 2006 | "Totally Re-Fucked" | 133 | - | Totally Re-Fucked |
| 2006 | Dig Your Own Grave | - | - | |

=== Demos ===
- "4 Track Demo" (July 2004)
