= Palma Violets =

English band

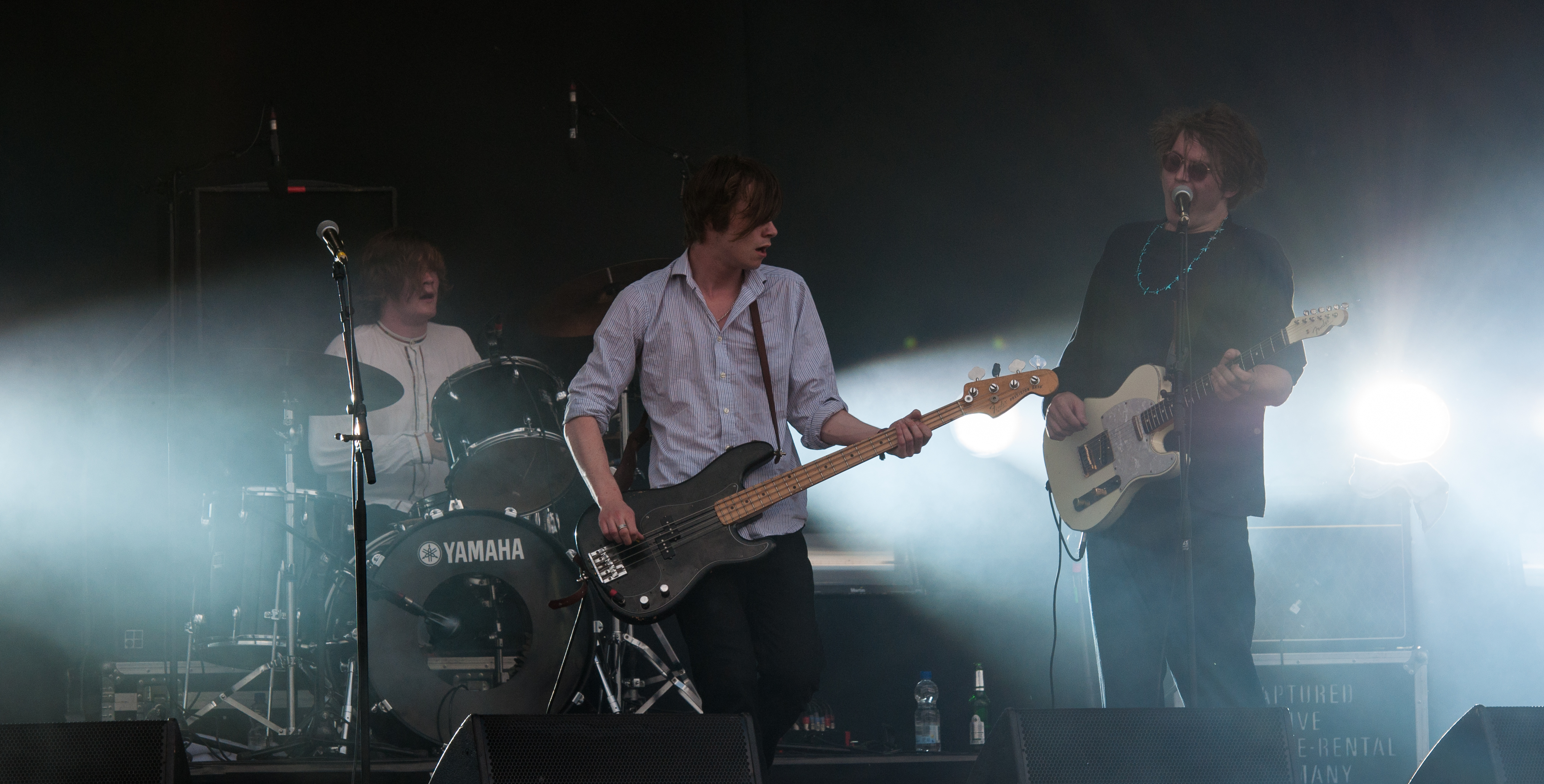
- Palma Violets performing in 2013

Background information
- Also known as: 'The Violets' and 'the Palmas'
- Origin: Lambeth, London, England
- Genres: Indie rock, garage rock
- Years active: 2011–2016
- Label: Rough Trade
- Past members: Samuel Fryer; Alexander Jesson; Jeffrey Mayhew; William Doyle; Paul Band

Palma Violets were an English band from Lambeth, London. The band formed in 2011, based on the musical partnership of frontmen Samuel Fryer and Chilli Jesson.

The band's musical output is primarily in the indie rock genre, with some garage rock and psychedelic influences. Palma Violets' first single, "Best of Friends", was voted NME's song of the year for 2012, and their debut album 180 was released on 25 February 2013.

Much like The Libertines, the band gained a substantial fan base online before the release of their first single – with multiple live videos of their gigs being uploaded by fans. The band were signed to Rough Trade Records. Palma Violets appeared on the 2013 NME Awards Tour, along with Miles Kane, Django Django and Peace. Since that time they have been heavily promoted by NME and have appeared in numerous magazine editions.

On 9 December 2012, the BBC announced that the band had been nominated for the Sound of 2013 poll.

== Biography ==
Palma Violets were formed by bassist/vocalist Alexander "Chilli" Jesson, guitarist/vocalist Samuel Thomas Fryer, keyboardist Jeffrey Peter Mayhew and drummer William Martin Doyle (not to be confused with East India Youth). On 10 January, the band premièred their track, "Step Up for the Cool Cats" on BBC Radio 1. Having been selected as Zane Lowe's Hottest Record in the World, the Steve Mackey-produced track was released on to iTunes shortly after; serving as the second single to be taken from 180 following the Rory Attwell produced debut single, and winner of NME's 'Track of the Year 2012', "Best of Friends".

On 16 February the band premiered the track "Danger in the Club" on BBC Radio 1. The next day they announced the release of their new album Danger in the Club, produced by John Leckie would be released 4 May via Rough Trade Records.

In December 2015, the band released a Christmas song called "Last Christmas on Planet Earth" with a release on 7" vinyl which featured on the B Side a rendition of "All the Garden Birds", sung by The Rhythm Studio Kids Choir.

Following the release of Danger in the Club, there was a noted silence from the band on social media leading to speculation that the band had split up. This was confirmed in an interview by Matt Wilkinson with guitarist Sam Fryer on 11 July 2018. All the members of Palma Violets bar Chilli Jesson were in a new band called Gently Tender with Celia Archer of The Big Moon. Chilli Jesson went on to form the band Crewel Intentions,

== Discography ==
=== Studio albums ===
Album	Details	Peak positions		Certification
Album	Details	UK	SWE	Certification
180	Released: 25 February 2013; Label: Rough Trade; Format: CD, LP, Digital download	11	52	
Danger in the Club	Released: 4 May 2015; Label: Rough Trade; Format: CD, LP, Digital download	25	–	

=== EPs ===
Title	Details
Invasion of the Tribbles	Released: 20 August 2013; Label: Rough Trade; Format: LP

=== Singles ===
Title	Year	Album
"Best of Friends"/"Last of the Summer Wine"	2012	180
"Step Up for the Cool Cats"	2013	180
"We Found Love"	2013	180
"Danger in the Club"	2015	Danger in the Club
"English Tongue"	2015	Danger in the Club
"Peter and the Gun"	2015	Danger in the Club
"The Jacket Song"	2015	Danger in the Club
"Last Christmas on Planet Earth"	2015	Non-album single
"Coming Over to My Place"	2016	Danger in the Club
"Matador"	2016	Danger in the Club
"Secrets of America"	2016	Danger in the Club

== Awards and nominations ==
Year	Organization	Award	Work	Result
2012	BBC	Sound of 2013	—N/a	Nominated
2012	NME Awards	50 Best Tracks of 2012	Best of Friends	Won
2013	NME Awards	Best New Band	—N/a	Won
2013	Q Awards	Best New Act	—N/a	Nominated
2014	NME Awards	Best British Band	—N/a	Nominated
2014	NME Awards	Best Live Band	—N/a	Nominated
2014	Ivor Novello Awards	Best Song Musically and Lyrically	Best of Friends	Nominated
