= Big Deal (band) =

English pop rock duo active from 2011 to 2016

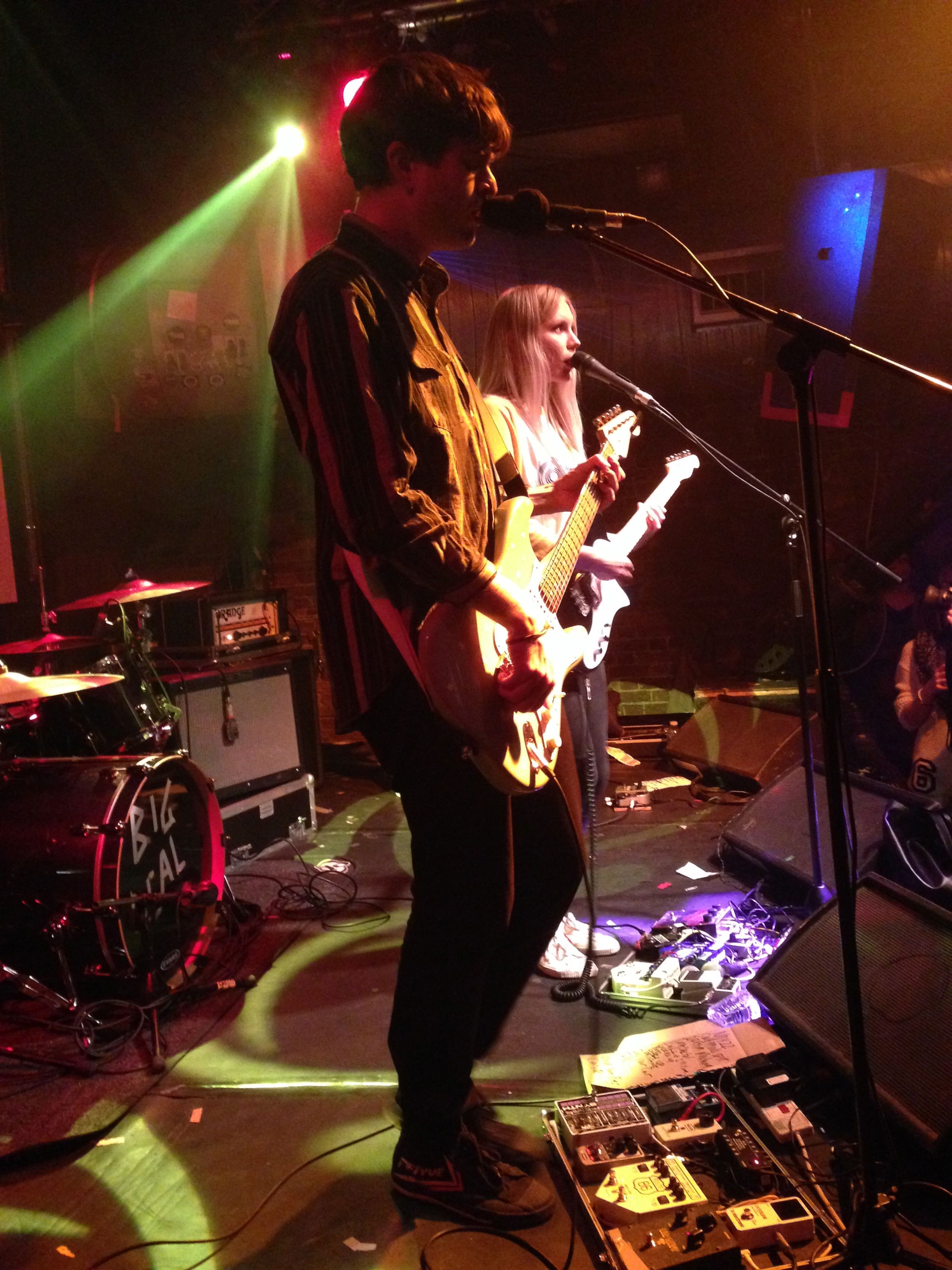
- Underwood and Costelloe in London 2013

Background information
- Origin: Underwood: California, USA; Costelloe: London, UK
- Genres: Pop rock, new wave, synthpop
- Years active: 2011–2016
- Labels: MUTE Artist Ltd.; FatCat Records
- Members: Kacey Underwood; Alice Costelloe
- Past members: Mel Rigby; Huw Webb
- Website: https://wearebigdeal.bandcamp.com/

Big Deal were a pop/rock band composed of Kacey Underwood and Alice Costelloe. Underwood was raised near Yucca Valley in California while Costelloe came from an artistic household in London. They rose to prominence following the release of their second album June Gloom which received airplay on BBC 6Music in 2013. The band toured Europe with Depeche Mode in 2014. On 1 September 2016 they announced their break up.

== Lights Out ==
2011's Lights Out, a 12 track LP, is a collection of folk and grunge folk songs. It was recorded without a drum or bass track and produced by Underwood and producer Dean Reid. Sam Wolfson of NME called the album "more grungy than gooey". Video singles "Talk", "Chair", and "Homework" were released, with "Talk" becoming a single release in its own right.

== June Gloom ==
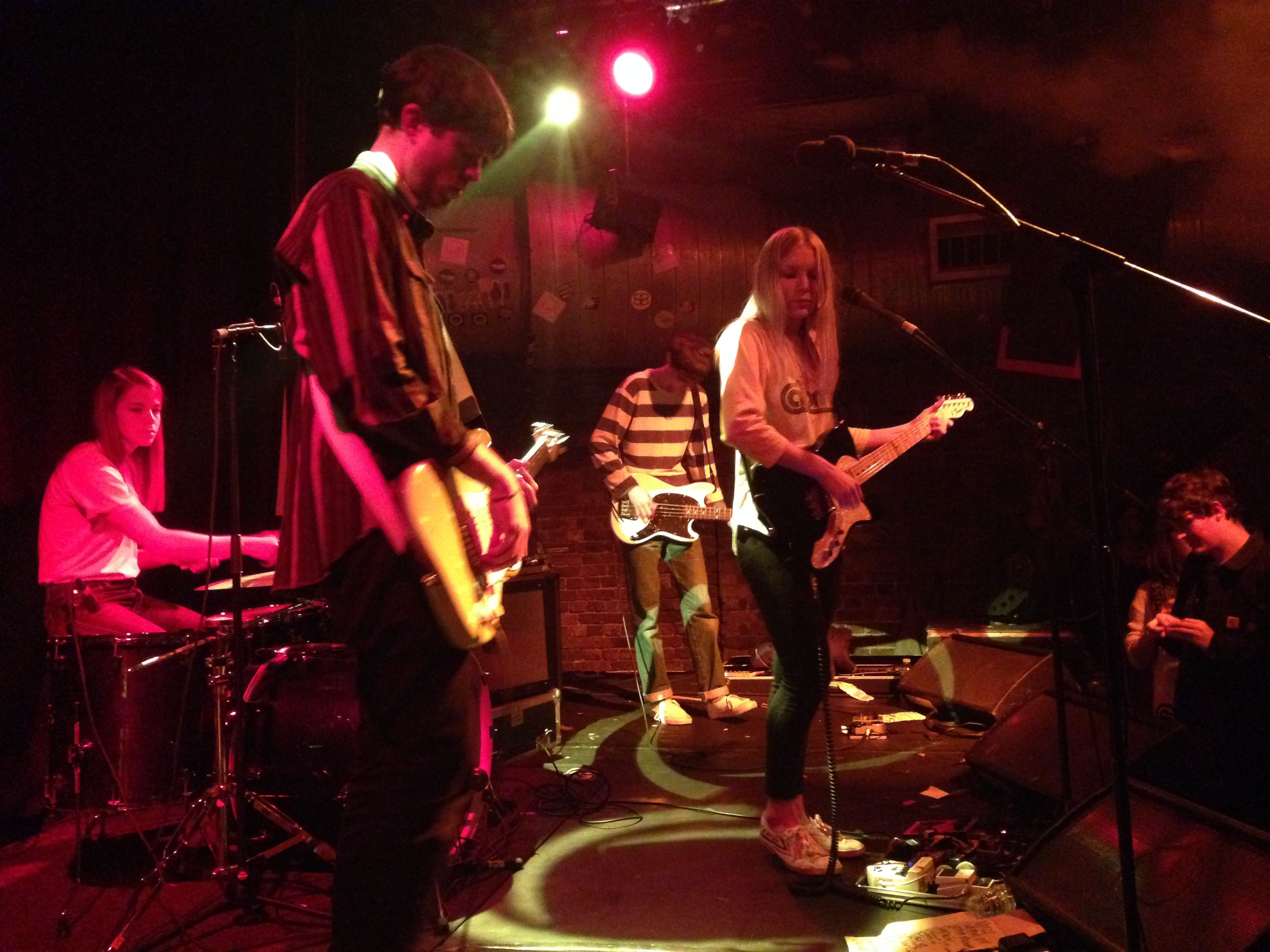
Pic from side of stage from Left, Mel Rigby, K.C. Underwood, Huw Webb and Alice Costelloe

June Gloom was released on June 4, 2013 and featured regularly on BBC 6Music radio. Its lead single "Swapping Spit" was accompanied by a live video clip all in VHS taping style. The heavy, grunge guitars of Costelloe and Underwood coupled with the heavily compressed explosive drumming of new addition Mel Rigby saw a distinct change from 2011's Lights Out. Bass guitarist Huw Webb provided a musical shadow to Costelloe's rhythm guitar work and, with Rigby, brought the band from a dual guitar folk duet to an explosive wall-of-sound band of dynamic shifts and crafted songwork. Heather Phares of allmusic reviewed June Gloom and wrote "Here and throughout the album, Big Deal is nostalgic not just for the sounds of the '90s, but for the best--and worst--parts of being in love."

Notable live gigs in support of June Gloom included July 13 at Herk-de-Stad's Rock Herk and London's Love Box on the 20th of July and Secret Garden Party in Cambridge on the 27th of July. With a doubling of personnel on stage, live performances at this time strongly acknowledged the shoe-gaze influences of Underwood and Costelloe, with the band minimally interacting with the audience. Live performances were also reminiscent of influences of Pixies, where the album was recreated live with the assistance of multiple effects (mostly from Underwood).

== Say Yes ==
Released 10 June 2016, Say Yes was Big Deal's third and final album. Created during the break up of Costelloe and Underwood's relationship, the production of the album was also marred by losing all their demos when Underwood's laptop was stolen at a house party and leaving their record label Mute. The project was self-funded and was picked up by FatCat Records with most of the record finished, and to generally favourable reviews. When the band unexpectedly split in September 2016, their tour and festival appearances were cancelled.

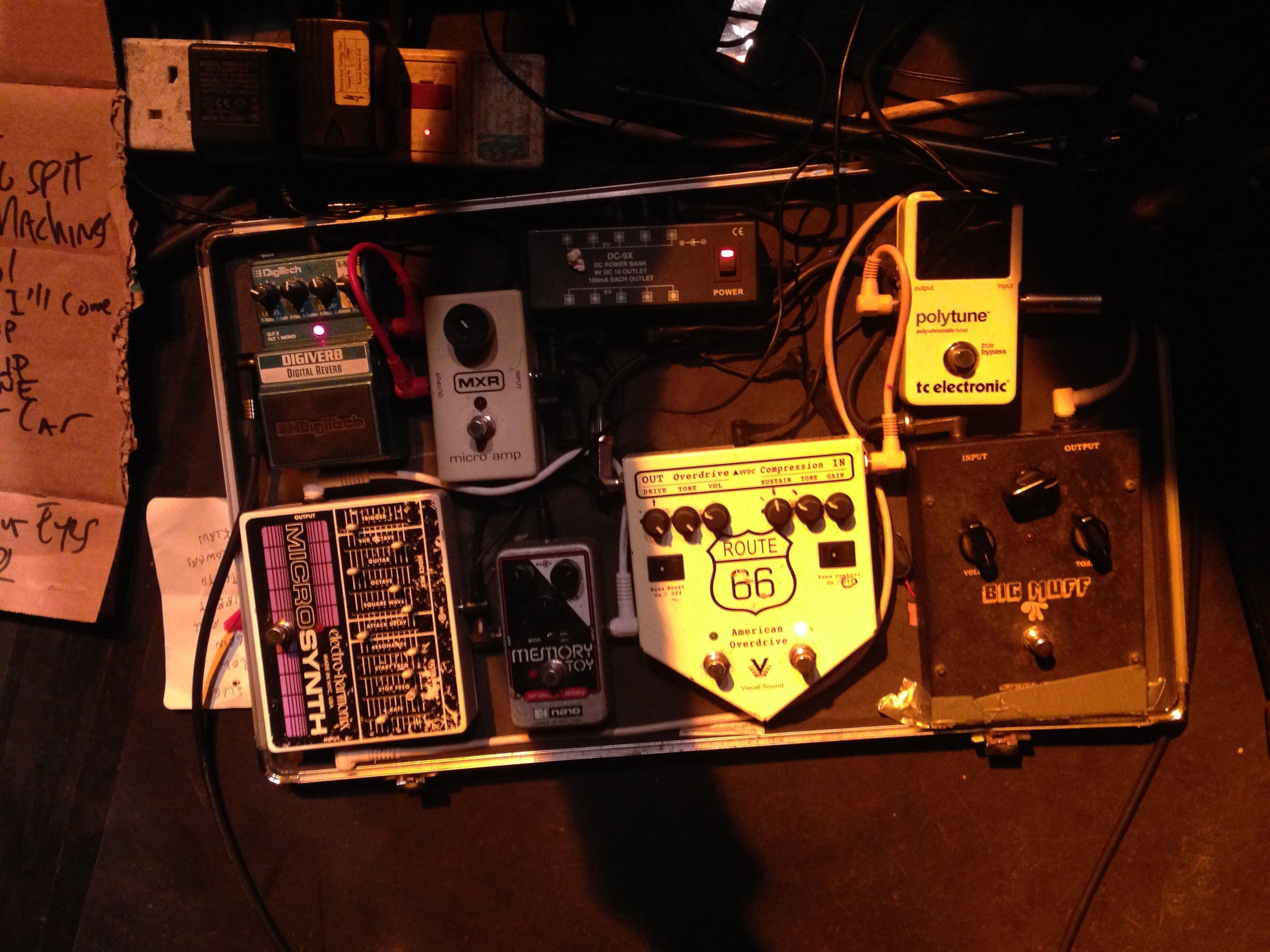
Kacey Underwood's pedal line up for 2013's June Gloom
