= For Screening Purposes Only =

Studio album by Test Icicles
- Released: 31 October 2005
- Recorded: 2005 at Black Box Studios, France
- Genre: Dance-punk; hardcore punk; noise rock; post-hardcore
- Length: 55:06
- Label: Domino (UK)
- Producer: James Ford; Simian

Test Icicles chronology
| For Screening Purposes Only (2005) | Dig Your Own Grave EP (2006) |

Professional ratings
Aggregate scores
| Source | Rating |
|---|---|
| Metacritic | 66/100 |
Review scores
| Source | Rating |
| AllMusic | 3.5/5 stars |
| The Guardian | 2/5 stars |
| NME | 8/10 |
| Pitchfork | 8.1/10 |
| PopMatters | 5/10 |
| Rolling Stone | 3/5 stars |
| Tiny Mix Tapes | 4/5 marks |

For Screening Purposes Only is the debut studio album by UK dance-punk trio Test Icicles, released in 2005. It was critically praised for being unique and compelling in an increasingly homogenous indie music scene. Following the group's split in February 2006, the album remains Test Icicles' only LP.

== Title ==
The name of the album is derived from the 1999 film Thicker Than Water. In the movie the phrase "For screening purposes only" appears on screen whenever any violence occurs in the film. Band member Rory Atwell has also stated that the first song on the album, "Your Biggest Mistake", is about the film.

== Composition ==
The sounds on Screening Purposes fit somewhere between "cleaned-up" death-disco and "manicured" noise rock and dons "dance-punk verve and hardcore mayhem". It also digs into "hook-filled, slash-and burn" post-hardcore.

However, the trio bring in eclectic sounds of avant-pop, doom metal, funk and hip hop throughout.

== Track listing ==
Track listings and writing credits.

1. "Your Biggest Mistake" - 4:01 (Sam Mehran)
2. "Pull the Lever" - 3:58 (Rory Attwell)
3. "Interlude" - 0:52 (Instrumental)
4. "Boa vs. Python" - 3:02 (Sam Mehran)
5. "Circle. Square. Triangle" - 3:06 (Sam Mehran, Rory Attwell, Devonte Hynes)
6. "Catch It!" - 3:38 (lyrics by Devonte Hynes, music by Sam Mehran)
7. "Maintain the Focus" - 3:35 (Sam Mehran)
8. "Snowball" – 3:12 (Rory Attwell)
9. "What's Your Damage?" - 4:09 (Sam Mehran)
10. "All You Need Is Blood" - 4:07 (Devonte Hynes + reversed rap by Sam Mehran)
11. "Sharks" – 3:42 (Sam Mehran)
12. "Dancing on Pegs" - 2:16 (Rory Attwell)
13. "Party on Dudes (Get Hype)" - 12:30 (Sam Mehran)
14. "What's Michelle Like?" (Sam Mehran, Rory Attwell, Devonte Hynes) (US Bonus Track) (UK Hidden Track)
15. "What's In the Box?" (Rory Attwell) (US Bonus Track)
16. ""Circle. Square. Triangle (MC Lars Edit)" - 3:06 (Sam Mehran, Rory Attwell, Devonte Hynes) (Japan Bonus Track)
17. ""Circle. Square. Triangle (James Ford Remix)" - 3:14 (Sam Mehran, Rory Attwell, Devonte Hynes) (Japan Bonus Track)
