= Bryndon Cook =

American actor, singer-songwriter and producer-composer

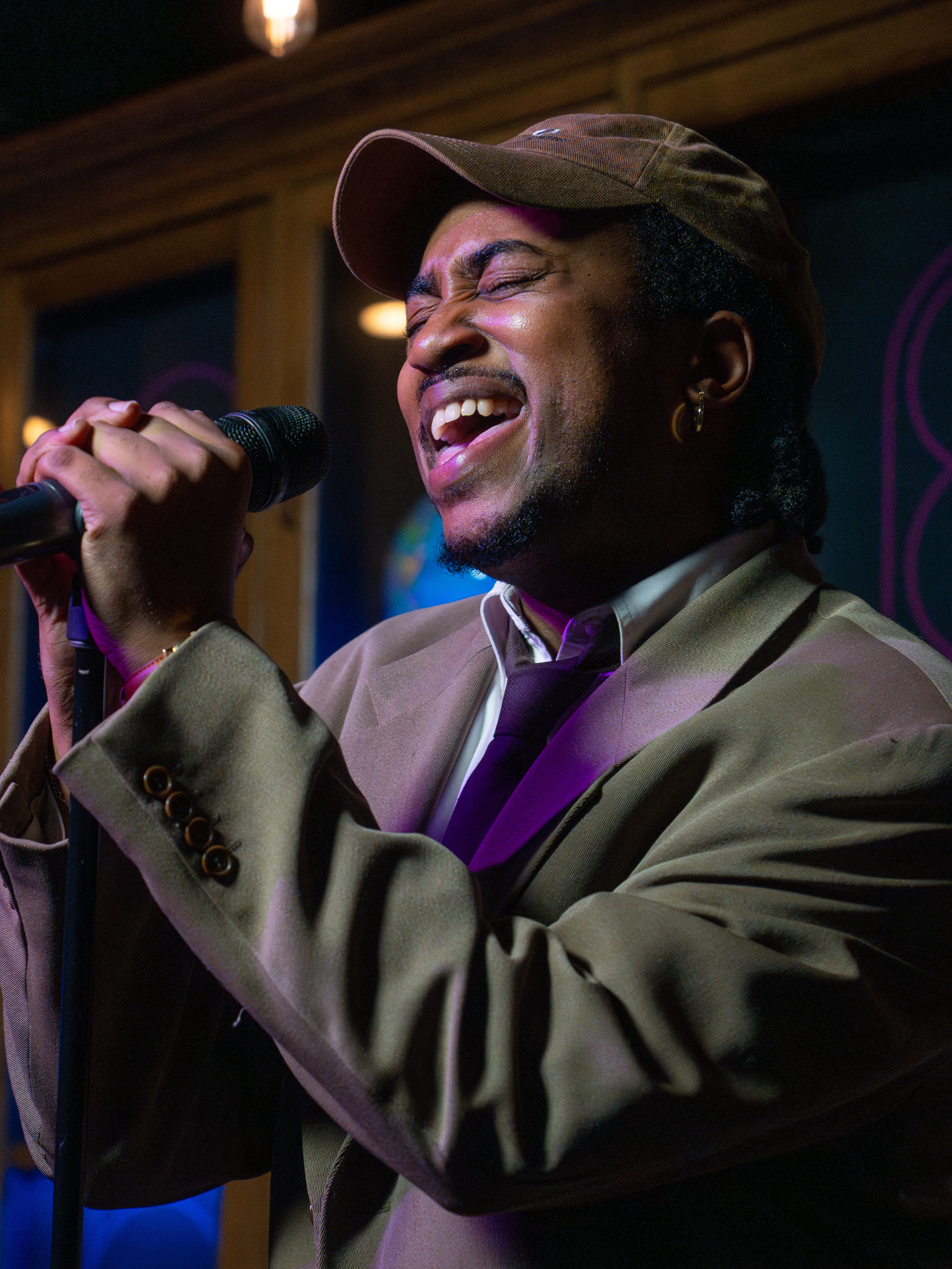
- Cook in 2025

Background information
- Also known as: Starchild
- Born: Bryndon Cook; 1992 or 1993 (age 33–34)
- Genres: R&B, funk
- Occupations: Musician, producer, singer-songwriter
- Instruments: Guitar, keyboard, bass, drums, tenor saxophone
- Years active: 2012–present
- Labels: Ghostly, New Romantic World
- Website: newromanticworld.net

Bryndon Cook, who also goes by the solo act Starchild & the New Romantic, is an American musician, producer, and singer-songwriter. He is best known for his work as the touring guitarist and music director for singer Solange Knowles, and his collaborations with musician Dev Hynes.

== Early life ==
Cook grew up in Maryland. His family had also lived in Mississippi. In an Interview magazine article, Cook said that his family moved to Atlanta, Georgia during his "very formative years, when I was 9 to 13 or 14", and he taught himself guitar and playing by ear while watching VH1 Classic and listening to Prince's music. In high school, he was interested in journalism and worked on the student newspaper. He returned to the Washington DC area to finish high school.

He attended State University of New York at Purchase, graduating in 2015 with a BFA in Theater. He also did an internship with music website Pitchfork.

== Music career ==
=== Collaborations career ===
In 2012, while still a student at SUNY Purchase, he reached out to singer and friend "Blood Orange" Dev Hynes, and ended up performing a rap at the end of Hynes's single "Neptune". He would also later contribute vocals for several tracks on the 2016 Blood Orange album Freetown Sound and the music video "Augustine". In 2017, he collaborated with Hynes as a duo called VeilHymn and releasing a single called "Hymn".

In 2013, he met Patrick Wimberly of the band Chairlift, who told him of an opportunity to join Solange Knowles's band as the guitarist for an upcoming album tour, replacing Dev Hynes. He has since become a regular touring member, also supporting tour mates Kindness and Chairlift. Cook worked on Knowles's 2016 album A Seat at the Table, co-producing and playing bass guitar on the track "Don't Touch My Hair", which reached number 91 on the Billboard Hot 100. In 2017, he became Knowles' band leader and music director. He also worked with Kindness on the latter's 2019 single "Raise Up", where he plays brass and piano.

In 2021, he served as the music director and guitarist for cellist Kelsey Lu on the latter's operatic project This Is a Test at The Shed in New York City.

=== Solo career ===
While touring with Solange, Hynes, and Chairlift, Cook wrote songs and music for his own solo career, where he goes under the moniker Starchild & the New Romantic, which was inspired by the P-Funk collective as well as Prince. He described his moniker as a portmanteau bridging the traditions of afrofuturism and new romanticism.

On March 18, 2016, he released his debut EP Crucial consisting of eight tracks, under the Ghostly label. He produced and recorded the EP on his own. The name was based on frequently used slang words "crucial" and "vicious" at the time and he likens the theme of the songs to diary entries from his teenage years. It was also named after an unreleased bootleg album attributed to Prince.

On February 23, 2018, he released his first studio album Language. He described the concept for the album as "from a 'very specific heartbreak and break up' toward the end of his college days when he first started working on the record", and "It's been pieced together with a lot of different experiences from the end of college and stepping into adulthood, but trying to maintain what makes you truly yourself." He wrote many of songs while on the road with various bands including Kindness.

He released his second EP, VHS 1138 on his own label on November 3, 2019.

He released his second album Forever on June 19, 2020.

=== Other media appearances ===
Cook has walked or worked for fashion brands, including: Telfar, Dolce & Gabbana and ASOS

In 2019, Cook participated in the third TV season of The Marvelous Mrs. Maisel as an actor and as providing music. He also had a role in a season 1 episode of Godfather of Harlem. He was part of the "TTB Band" in the 2021 Lin-Manuel Miranda-directed film Tick, Tick... Boom! which released on Netflix.

== Discography ==
=== EPs ===
- Crucial (Ghostly, 2016)
- VHS 1138 (New Romantic World, 2019)

=== Studio albums ===
- Language (Ghostly, 2018)
- Forever (New Romantic World, 2020)
