= A Seat at the Table =

Studio album by Solange
- Released: September 30, 2016
- Recorded: 2013 – June 21, 2016
- Studios: New Iberia, Louisiana
- Genres: Neo soul; funk; R&B
- Length: 51:43
- Labels: Saint; Columbia
- Producers: Solange Knowles; Raphael Saadiq; Dave Longstreth; Sir Dylan; Sampha; Kwes; Patrick Wimberly; Adam Bainbridge; John Kirby; Troy Johnson; Dave Andrew Sitek; Bryndon Cook; Questlove; Ray Angry; Majical Cloudz; Olugbenga; Sean Nicholas Savage; Q-Tip

Solange chronology
True (2012)	A Seat at the Table (2016)	When I Get Home (2019)

Singles from A Seat at the Table
- 1. "Cranes in the Sky" Released: October 5, 2016

A Seat at the Table is the third studio album by American singer-songwriter Solange. It was released on September 30, 2016, by Saint Records and Columbia Records. During the process of creating the album, Solange released an EP, titled True (2012) and launched her own record label named Saint Records. Writing for the album began as early as 2008, while the recording sessions took place from 2013 to June 2016. Solange enlisted a variety of collaborators including rappers Lil Wayne and Q-Tip; singer-songwriters The-Dream, BJ the Chicago Kid, Kelly Rowland and Tweet; and musicians Sampha, Kelela and David Longstreth.

A Seat at the Table was widely acclaimed by music critics and became Solange's first number-one album on the Billboard 200 in the United States, debuting with 72,000 album-equivalent units. The album's lead single, "Cranes in the Sky", won the Grammy for Best R&B Performance, becoming Solange's first Grammy nomination and win. In 2020, the album was ranked at 312 on Rolling Stone's 500 Greatest Albums of All Time list.

== Background ==
In 2009, in an interview with MTV, Solange revealed that she was determining the type of sound for the follow-up to Sol-Angel and the Hadley St. Dreams. Solange rented a house in Santa Barbara, California to get into a certain state of mind while writing and making music. In an interview with Vibe on July 7, 2010, Solange said she suffered "a little bit of a breakdown" while recording her new album: "I literally gave up my sanity for a while to do this record. ... We literally were waking up in the morning and just making music all day and all night. ... It just started to wear on me in so many different ways. I started having these crazy panic attacks." Solange explained how she made sacrifices "mentally, emotionally and financially", and continued, "It's more than an album to me. It's a transitional time in my life." While still working on her third studio album, Solange released an EP titled True, for digital download on iTunes November 27, 2012. On May 14, 2013, Solange announced that she had launched her own record label named Saint Records, which she will be using to release her third full-length album and future music projects distributed through Sony.

On May 15, 2015, Solange performed a new song at an HBO-sponsored event. The song, which is titled "Rise" was inspired by police killings in Ferguson and Baltimore and the subsequent protests. The song is the opening track on the album and is a funk song that utilizes synth. The day after the performance, Solange revealed she had written twenty-four songs for her third studio album; the songs were written to piano, with Solange structuring them on her own before finding the producers to finish them. In July 2015, Solange announced that her third studio album was nearly complete, and that she was laying low on the performance side until her new music was complete, however she made an exception performing at the FYF festival. On her thirtieth birthday, she stated that she completed A Seat at the Table, her third studio album (fourth overall) three days before her birthday, on June 21, 2016. On September 27, 2016, Solange announced via her Twitter account: "I am overwhelmed with gratitude & excitement to share this work I've written and created, with you... #ASeatAtTheTable". In a statement, Solange described the new album as "a project on identity, empowerment, independence, grief and healing." Set for release on September 30, she had reportedly been working on the album since 2013.

== Recording ==
In the early days of recording sessions, Solange experimented with different sounds and ideas, which did not feature on the official track listing but did inform her on creating the album's identity, sound, early lyrics and concepts. The initial conception of the album happened on Long Island and in New Orleans where she began to collaborate on ideas with various artists. Solange stated that during these stages it was just her "singing a melody" or "somebody playing her a synth or bass line that would turn into an hour-long track". Following these sessions, Solange traveled to New Iberia in Louisiana along with the hour long tracks. Solange went there with her engineers and began creating the songs' actual structures, building the sounds, writing the lyrics and creating melodies. Eventually, Solange took these tracks to Los Angeles to collaborate with Raphael Saadiq and Troy Johnson, stating: "When I look back at the beginning stages, I remember the powerful energy that set the tone, and that I'm so grateful followed us everywhere during the creation of this record."

Solange wrote "Cranes in the Sky" eight years prior to the album's release. In 2008, producer and singer Raphael Saadiq handed Solange a CD with a few instrumentals on it. One consisted of just drums, strings and bass. That night Solange returned to her hotel and wrote "Cranes in the Sky". Eight years later when Solange had finished writing and creating A Seat at the Table in New Iberia, Louisiana she revisited "Cranes in the Sky". Shortly after that she called Raphael and asked if he would help to produce a few of the other songs of the album. American rapper Master P worked on the majority of the album's interludes with Solange. Solange contacted Master P and asked if he would narrate some of the album's songs; the interludes were created from conversation regarding the world's issues.

== Music and lyrics ==
The album's themes include rage, despair and empowerment. It comprises funk, neo soul, psychedelic soul and contemporary R&B. The album opens with 90-second long track "Rise" released a year earlier. "Weary" is a track filled with organs, guitar and bass and speaks about weariness and loneliness. "Borderline (An Ode to Self-Care)" has the same theme. "Interlude: The Glory Is in You" has the theme of finding self-peace. "Cranes in the Sky" is an upbeat track that speaks about attempts to alleviate the pain in alcohol, sex, music or even running away. In the following interview, Solange's father and former manager Mathew Knowles speaks about his childhood filled with integration, segregation and racism, which left him "angry for years". "Mad", featuring Lil Wayne, is a track about indignation and anger. "Don't You Wait" contains elements of funk, drums and bass and contains a statement from Solange's mother Tina Knowles. "Don't Touch My Hair" comprises electronic and funk music and explores a common experience for African-American women. Following interlude speaks about worth and independence. "F.U.B.U." is a nod to 1990s fashion label For Us By Us. The following interlude has the message "Don't let anybody steal your magic". "Don't Wish Me Well" contains elements of electronic and psychedelic soul music. "Pedestals" also has a theme of self-care. "Scales" is a down-tempo track. Also, all lyrics were written alongside images in an accompanying digital art book, released on Solange's official website.

== Visuals ==
Solange said that A Seat at the Table was an exercise in world-making, through which she could reclaim a sense of home. By representing Black cowboys in her album visuals, she attempted to reclaim narratives about Houston, Texas which had been whitewashed. The album visuals also featured elements of chopped and screwed and candy painting culture from Houston.

== Release and promotion ==
A Seat at the Table was released for digital download and streaming on September 30, 2016, through Solange's recording label Saint Records. Distributed through Columbia Records and Sony Music Entertainment, its physical release was November 18 on CD, and December 9 on LP. The album was promoted with two music videos, directed by Solange and Alan Ferguson, "Don't Touch My Hair" and "Cranes in the Sky" which premiered on October 3. Solange performed both songs on Saturday Night Live on November 5. On December 8, Solange was interviewed by Helga Davis on the Q2 Podcast. On December 15, she performed a medley of "Rise" and "Weary" on The Tonight Show Starring Jimmy Fallon. On January 10, 2017, Solange was interviewed by her sister Beyoncé for Interview. On February 9, Solange's interview with Elle was released. In 2017, she performed at numerous festivals including Essence, Glastonbury, WayHome, Panorama, and Pitchfork. Solange later embarked on her "Orion's Rise" performance art tour, fusing music and art in performances at select theaters, including the art piece "Scales" in the city of Marfa, Texas, during Chinati Foundation Weekend.

== Critical reception ==
Professional ratings
Aggregate scores
Source	Rating
AnyDecentMusic?	8.5/10
Metacritic	89/100
Review scores
Source	Rating
AllMusic	5/5 stars
Chicago Tribune	3.5/4 stars
Entertainment Weekly	A
Financial Times	4/5 stars
The Guardian	4/5 stars
The Independent	3/5 stars
NME	4/5
The Observer	4/5 stars
Pitchfork	8.7/10
Rolling Stone	4/5 stars

A Seat at the Table was met with widespread critical acclaim. At Metacritic, which assigns a normalized rating out of 100 to reviews from mainstream publications, the album received an average score of 89, based on 26 reviews.

Reviewing the album in Rolling Stone, Maura Johnston described it as a "fantastic-sounding LP that takes sonic cues from dusty soul sides while sounding as timely as a freshly sent tweet". Financial Times critic Ludovic Hunter-Tilney said like Beyoncé's Lemonade album, "A Seat at the Table explores themes of prejudice and blackness. But it does so in a different register, setting [Solange's] deft soprano to an updated version of psychedelic funk and soul." Emily Mackay from The Guardian wrote, "[Solange has] long been engagingly outspoken on issues of race, and from the title down, A Seat at the Table is an intensely personal testament to black experience and culture; the likes of 'F.U.B.U.,' 'Mad,' 'Don't Touch My Hair' and interludes in which her parents talk about their encounters with racism go deep. Sonically, the album's take on modern psychedelic soul is languid, rich, lifted by airy, Minnie Riperton–esque trills on the gorgeous likes of 'Cranes in the Sky' or the darkly glimmering 'Don't Wish Me Well'; it's a world away from 2008's peppier, poppier Sol-Angel and the Hadley St. Dreams or 2012's indie-crossover-hit True EP. Guest spots from artists as diverse as Lil Wayne, Sampha, Tweet and Kelela only serve to amplify Solange's fascinating voice. It's safe to say that though big sis Beyoncé has run her close recently, she's once more the most intriguing Knowles sibling." Gerrick D. Kennedy from Los Angeles Times wrote: "Those two worlds of black existence — at home and in the world at large — serves [sic] as the basis for Solange Knowles' exquisite, sumptuous new album, A Seat at the Table." BET.com gave the album a positive review, stating: "Thankfully, Solange's A Seat at the Table is the journal we don't get the time to write, the conversations we don't get to have and the exclamations we're too tired to repeat."

Some reviewers expressed reservations. Andy Gill from The Independent credited Knowles for acknowledging "a world beyond romantic cliche", but concluded "there's little punch or pop charm to the album, which boasts a surfeit of luscious textures and feisty attitudes, but a shortfall of killer melodies." Robert Christgau was less enthusiastic about the album after listening to it several times: "I assume its rep isn't just some mass delusion—that there's something there, and that it has to do with black female identity. But it left me unmoved, indeed untouched, and I'm not gonna lie about it." Tom Hull observed "a big production with scores of writers, producers, and guests, but the sound hardly suggests such scale, and the songs are laced with a male commentary which while interesting in its own right could just as well belong to a completely different album."

=== Listicles ===
A Seat at the Table was included in many 2016 year-end lists, being ranked the best album of the year by Pitchfork, Spin, and Vibe. The album was ranked sixth on Pitchfork's 2010s decade-end list and 312th on Rolling Stone's 2020 revision of the "500 Greatest Albums of All Time".

Select year-end lists for A Seat at the Table
Publication	Accolade	Rank	Ref.
The A.V. Club	Top 50 Albums of 2016	13	
Chicago Tribune	Top Albums of 2016	9	
The Independent	Best Albums of 2016	14	
Pitchfork	The 50 Best Albums of 2016	1	
The Quietus	Albums of the Year 2016	2	
Rolling Stone	50 Best Albums of 2016	11	
The Skinny	Top 50 Albums of 2016	2	
Spin	The 50 Best Albums of 2016	1	
Time	The Top 10 Best Albums of 2016	2	
Vibe	The 25 Best Albums of 2016	1	

== Commercial performance ==
A Seat at the Table debuted at number one on the US Billboard 200, becoming her first album to reach the top of the chart, and also topped the US Top R&B/Hip-Hop Albums chart. It debuted with 72,000 album-equivalent units, out of which 46,000 were pure album sales and 24,000 streaming and track equivalent units. As the album reached number one, Solange and Beyoncé became the first sisters, who are both solo artists, to achieve number one albums on the Billboard 200 in the same calendar year. On January 17, 2019, the album was certified gold by the Recording Industry Association of America (RIAA) for combined sales and album-equivalent units of over 500,000 units in the United States.

It also became her first album to chart in several countries. In United Kingdom, it peaked at number seventeen on UK Albums Chart, number two on UK R&B Albums Chart and number eight on UK Digital Albums, all published by the Official Charts Company (OCC). It also peaked at number sixty-six on Scottish Albums Chart, also published by OCC. It peaked at number twenty-one on Australian Albums Chart, published by the Australian Recording Industry Association (ARIA). In Belgium, it peaked at number fifty-three on Ultratop Flanders album chart and number eighty-three on Ultratop Wallonia album chart. It reached top forty in Norway and Sweden, peaking at numbers thirty-two and thirty-nine, respectively. It reached top thirty in New Zealand and Netherlands, peaking at numbers twenty-three and twenty-five, respectively. It also reached the top ten on the Canadian Albums Chart.

== Track listing ==
A Seat at the Table standard track listing
No.	Title	Writer(s)	Producer(s)	Length
1.	"Rise"	Solange Knowles	Knowles; Raphael Saadiq; Questlove; Ray Angry; Majical Cloudz	1:41
2.	"Weary"	Knowles	Knowles; Saadiq; Sir Dylan	3:14
3.	"Interlude: The Glory Is in You"	Knowles	Knowles; Saadiq; Dylan	0:17
4.	"Cranes in the Sky"	Knowles	Knowles; Saadiq	4:10
5.	"Interlude: Dad Was Mad"	Knowles	Knowles; Saadiq; Dylan; Dave Longstreth	0:46
6.	"Mad" (featuring Lil Wayne)	Knowles; Dwayne Carter	Knowles; Saadiq; Dylan; Longstreth	3:55
7.	"Don't You Wait"	Knowles	Knowles; Sampha; Longstreth; Olugbenga; Troy Johnson; Kwes; Adam Bainbridge	4:05
8.	"Interlude: Tina Taught Me"	Knowles	Knowles; Sampha; Dave Andrew Sitek; Patrick Wimberly; Bryndon Cook	1:14
9.	"Don't Touch My Hair" (featuring Sampha)	Knowles; Sampha Sisay	Knowles; Sampha; Sitek; Wimberly; Cook	4:17
10.	"Interlude: This Moment"	Knowles	Knowles; Bainbridge	0:49
11.	"Where Do We Go"	Knowles	Knowles; Saadiq; Dylan; Wimberly; Kwes; Sean Nicholas Savage	4:24
12.	"Interlude: For Us by Us"	Knowles	Knowles; John Kirby	0:52
13.	"F.U.B.U." (featuring The Dream and BJ the Chicago Kid)	Knowles; Terius Nash	Knowles; Longstreth	5:13
14.	"Borderline (An Ode to Self Care)" (featuring Q-Tip)	Knowles	Knowles; Q-Tip	3:02
15.	"Interlude: I Got So Much Magic, You Can Have It" (featuring Kelly Rowland and Nia Andrews)	Knowles		0:26
16.	"Junie"	Knowles	Knowles; Kirby; Saadiq	3:06
17.	"Interlude: No Limits"	Knowles	Knowles; Kirby	0:39
18.	"Don't Wish Me Well"	Knowles	Knowles; Kwes; Longstreth; Sampha; Bainbridge	4:15
19.	"Interlude: Pedestals"	Knowles	Knowles	0:57
20.	"Scales" (featuring Kelela)	Knowles	Knowles; Kwes; Longstreth; Wimberly	3:39
21.	"Closing: The Chosen Ones"	Knowles	Knowles; Johnson	0:42
Total length:				51:43

Notes

- "Interlude: The Glory Is in You", "Interlude: For Us by Us", "Interlude: No Limits", "Interlude: Pedestals" and "Closing: The Chosen Ones" are performed by Master P.
- "Interlude: Dad Was Mad" is performed by Mathew Knowles.
- "Interlude: Tina Taught Me" is performed by Tina Knowles.
- "Interlude: This Moment" is performed by Master P, Kelsey Lu, Sampha and Devonte Hynes.
- "Rise" features additional vocals by Raphael Saadiq.
- "Weary" features additional vocals by Tweet.
- "Mad" features additional vocals by The Dream, Moses Sumney and Tweet.
- "Don't You Wait" features additional vocals by Olugbenga.
- "Where Do We Go" features additional vocals by Sean Nicholas Savage.
- "F.U.B.U." features additional vocals by Tweet.
- "Junie" features uncredited vocals by André 3000.
- "Borderline (An Ode To Self Care)" contains a portion of the composition "More Than a Woman", written by Stephen Garrett and Tim Mosley.

== Personnel ==
- Nia Andrews – featured artist (track 15), interlude performance (track 15)
- Ray Angry – production (track 1)
- Jake Aron – additional recording engineer
- Thayod Ayusar – additional recording engineer
- Adam Bainbridge – production (tracks 7, 10, 18), guitar (track 7), additional synth editing (track 4), additional vocal editing (track 20)
- Rostam Batmanglij – piano (track 13), organ (track 13), shaker (track 13), additional horn production (track 13)
- Casey Benjamin – keyboards (track 14)
- Mikaelin 'Blue' BlueSpruce – recording engineer, mixing
- Bobby Campbell – additional recording engineer
- BJ the Chicago Kid – featured artist (track 13)
- Rogét Chahayed – synths (track 4)
- Bryndon Cook – production (tracks 8, 9), additional bass (track 9), additional cowbell (track 9)
- Josh David – bass (track 14)
- The Dream – featured artist (track 13), additional vocals (track 6)
- "J Sounds" Holt – additional recording engineer
- Devonte Hynes – interlude performance (track 10)
- Hotae Alexander Jang – additional recording engineer
- Troy "R8dio" Johnson – associate producer, production (tracks 7, 21), bass (track 7), recording engineer
- Gloria Kaba – additional recording engineer
- Kelela – featured artist (track 20)
- John Kirby – production (tracks 12, 16, 17), synths (tracks 4, 16), piano (track 14)
- Mathew Knowles – interlude performance (track 5)
- Solange Knowles – lead artist, executive producer, production (tracks 1–14, 16–21), piano (track 19), interlude performance (track 15)
- Tina Knowles – interlude performance (track 8)
- Dave Kutch – mastering
- Kwes – production (tracks 7, 11, 18, 20)
- Lil Wayne – featured artist (track 6)
- Dave Longstreth – production (tracks 5–7, 13, 18, 20), guitar (track 7)
- Kelsey Lu – interlude performance (track 10)
- Majical Cloudz – production (track 1)
- Master P – interlude performance (tracks 3, 10, 12, 17, 19, 21)
- Olugbenga – production (track 7), bass (track 7), additional vocals (track 7)
- Ken Oriole – additional recording engineer
- Kevin Peterson – mastering assistance
- Q-Tip – featured artist (track 14), production (track 14), keyboards (track 14), drums (track 14)
- Questlove – production (track 1)
- Sam Robles – saxophone (track 9)
- Kelly Rowland – featured artist (track 15), interlude performance (track 15)
- Steve Rusch – additional recording engineer
- Raphael Saadiq – executive producer, production (tracks 1–6, 11, 16), additional bass (tracks 1, 9, 14), additional vocals (track 1)
- Sampha – featured artist (track 9), production (tracks 7–9, 18), interlude performance (track 10)
- Sean Nicholas Savage – production (track 11), additional vocals (track 11)
- Chris Sholar – guitar (track 14)
- Leon Silva – horns (track 21)
- Todd Simon – trumpet (track 9), flugelhorn (track 9)
- Sir Dylan – production (tracks 2, 3, 5, 6, 11), additional synth (track 1)
- Dave Andrew Sitek – production (tracks 8, 9)
- Moses Sumney – additional vocals (track 6)
- Tweet – additional vocals (tracks 2, 6, 13)
- Vic Wainstein – additional recording engineer
- Blair Wells – additional recording engineer
- Dontae Williams – horns (track 21)
- Kevin Williams – horns (track 21)
- Patrick Wimberly – production (tracks 8, 9, 11, 20), bass (track 7), additional synth (track 1)
- Nino Villanueva – recording engineer

== Charts ==
=== Weekly charts ===
Weekly chart performance for A Seat at the Table
Chart (2016–17)	Peak position
Australian Albums (ARIA)	21
Belgian Albums (Ultratop Flanders)	23
Belgian Albums (Ultratop Wallonia)	83
Canadian Albums (Billboard)	10
Danish Albums (Hitlisten)	17
Dutch Albums (Album Top 100)	17
French Albums (SNEP)	74
Irish Albums (IRMA)	28
New Zealand Albums (RMNZ)	23
Norwegian Albums (VG-lista)	30
Scottish Albums (Official Charts)	66
Swedish Albums (Sverigetopplistan)	39
Swiss Albums (Schweizer Hitparade)	64
UK Albums (Official Charts)	17
UK R&B Albums (Official Charts)	2
US Billboard 200	1
US Top R&B/Hip-Hop Albums (Billboard)	1

=== Year-end charts ===
2016 year-end chart performance for A Seat at the Table
Chart (2016)	Position
US Billboard 200	180
US Top R&B/Hip-Hop Albums (Billboard)	38

2017 year-end chart performance for A Seat at the Table
Chart (2017)	Position
Belgian Albums (Ultratop Flanders)	156
US Top R&B/Hip-Hop Albums (Billboard)	99

== Certifications ==
Region	Certification	Certified units/sales
Denmark (IFPI Danmark)	Gold	10,000^{‡}
United Kingdom (BPI)	Silver	60,000^{‡}
United States (RIAA)	Gold	500,000^{‡}
^{‡} Sales+streaming figures based on certification alone.

== Release history ==
List of release dates, showing region, format(s), label(s) and references
Region	Date	Format(s)	Label(s)	Ref.
Various	September 30, 2016	Digital download; streaming	Saint; Columbia; Sony Music	
Various	November 18, 2016	CD	Saint; Columbia; Sony Music	
Various	December 9, 2016	LP	Saint; Columbia; Sony Music	
