= Mercy (John Cale album) =

Studio album by John Cale
- Released: 20 January 2023
- Studio: ARM Studios (Los Angeles); EastWest Studios (Los Angeles); Vox Studios (Los Angeles); Snap Studios (London)
- Length: 71:34
- Label: Double Six
- Producer: John Cale; Nita Scott

John Cale chronology
M:FANS (2016)	Mercy (2023)	Poptical Illusion (2024)

Mercy is the seventeenth studio album by the Welsh musician and composer John Cale. It was released on 20 January 2023 by Double Six Records, making it Cale's first album of new songs in over a decade. It features collaborations with Tony Allen, Laurel Halo, Weyes Blood, Tei Shi, Animal Collective's Avey Tare and Panda Bear, Dev Hynes, Sylvan Esso, Actress, and Fat White Family. It was inspired by current events such as Donald Trump's first presidency, Brexit, COVID-19, climate change, civil rights, and right-wing extremism.

== Background ==
Cale has hinted at a new album numerous times over the years following the release of M:FANS (2016), his previous studio album featuring reworkings of old songs, and Shifty Adventures in Nookie Wood (2012), his last album with all new songs. When M:FANS was released in January 2016 Cale said that another new album with new songs would be released by the end of the year. According to a November 2017 interview, the album was set for a 2018 release. In September 2018, Cale said it will be released the following year. The album was subsequently completed before the COVID-19 pandemic, but its release was delayed.

On 1 August 2022 the first single from the yet-unnamed album, "Night Crawling", was released along with an animated video by Mickey Miles. The second single, "Story of Blood" featuring Weyes Blood, was released on 19 October 2022. The music video, directed by Jethro Waters, was released on the same day along with announcing the album title and track listing.

The standard edition of Mercy contains twelve songs, while the special edition includes a bonus 7" single with two more songs.

== Critical reception ==
Professional ratings
Aggregate scores
Source	Rating
Metacritic	81/100
Review scores
Source	Rating
AllMusic	4/5 stars
American Songwriter	4/5 stars
Clash	9/10
Classic Rock	4/5 stars
DIY	4.5/5 stars
Exclaim!	8/10
Mojo	4/5 stars
Pitchfork	7.8/10
Record Collector	4/5 stars
Uncut	9/10

Mercy was named the album of the month by Uncut with Tom Pinnock calling it "the most out-there work Cale has made in some time, a hermetically sealed, hallucinogenic journey that's as neon-lit and gothic as its cover art."

== Track listing ==
All tracks are written by John Cale.

Mercy track listing
No.	Title	Length
1.	"Mercy" (featuring Laurel Halo)	7:00
2.	"Marilyn Monroe's Legs (Beauty Elsewhere)" (featuring Actress)	6:53
3.	"Noise of You"	5:15
4.	"Story of Blood" (featuring Weyes Blood)	7:31
5.	"Time Stands Still" (featuring Sylvan Esso)	5:20
6.	"Moonstruck (Nico's Song)"	5:31
7.	"Everlasting Days" (featuring Animal Collective)	5:02
8.	"Night Crawling"	4:53
9.	"Not the End of the World"	6:17
10.	"The Legal Status of Ice" (featuring Fat White Family)	7:24
11.	"I Know You're Happy" (featuring Tei Shi)	5:15
12.	"Out Your Window"	5:13
Total length:		71:39

7" vinyl bonus tracks
No.	Title	Length
13.	"Pretty People"
14.	"Mercy (mercy-full mix)" (featuring Tony Allen)

== Personnel ==
Musicians

- John Cale – vocals, string arrangements (all tracks), bass guitar (1, 4–11, 13, 14), drums (1–5, 7–11), piano (1, 2, 4, 7–9, 12, 14), synthesizers (1–3, 8–10), noises (2), vintage keyboards (3, 5, 13, 14), Swarmatron (5), keyboards (6, 8, 11), acoustic guitar (10), guitar (11), additional strings (12); drone, percussion (13)
- Laurel Halo – additional vocals, effects, synthesizers (1)
- Matt Fish – cello (2–4, 6, 7, 12)
- Ian Walker – double bass (2–4, 6, 7, 12)
- Actress – synthesizers, effects (2)
- Joey Maramba – bass guitar (3, 5), bowed bass (4)
- Deantoni Parks – acoustic drums (3, 7), timpani (3), additional synthesizers (5), electronic drums (7), additional drums (8)
- Dustin Boyer – guitar (3), bass guitar (4), noises (7), backing vocals (8, 11); rhythm guitar, guitar solo (10); guitar (11)
- Caroline Buckman – viola (3, 4, 7)
- Leah Katz – viola (3, 4, 7)
- Rodney Wirtz – viola (3, 4, 7)
- Eric Gorfain – violin (3, 4, 7)
- Marissa Kuney – violin (3, 4, 7)
- Jenny Takamatsu – violin (3, 4, 7)
- Nita Scott – additional drums (4), additional percussion (9); additional drum programming, backing vocals (11)
- Weyes Blood – vocals (4)
- Nick Sanborn – acoustic guitar (5)
- Amelia Meath – vocals (5)
- Destani Wolf – backing vocals (6)
- Brian Weitz – synthesizers (7)
- Dave Portner – vocals (7)
- Noah Lennox – vocals (7)
- Tokimonsta – effects (9)
- Dev Hynes – acoustic guitar (10)
- Tei Shi – vocals (10)
- Jack Everett – acoustic drums, backing vocals (11)
- Adam J. Harmer – guitar, backing vocals (11)
- Nathan Saoudi – Juno, backing vocals (11)
- Lias Saoudi – vocals (11)
- Tony Allen – acoustic drums (14)

Technical

- John Cale – production
- Nita Scott – production (all tracks), mixing (14)
- Mike Bozzi – mastering
- Mikaelin Bluespruce – mixing (1, 3, 4, 11)
- Seven Davis Jr – mixing (2, 6, 8, 9, 13)
- Tokimonsta – mixing (5)
- Justin Raisen – mixing (7, 10, 12)
- Dustin Boyer – mixing (14), engineering (all tracks), additional production (8)
- Actress – additional production (2)

Visuals

- Abby Portner – artwork
- Rob Carmichael – graphic design

== Charts ==
Chart performance for Mercy
Chart (2023)	Peak Position
Austrian Albums (Ö3 Austria)	41
Belgian Albums (Ultratop Flanders)	14
Belgian Albums (Ultratop Wallonia)	145
German Albums (Offizielle Top 100)	16
Portuguese Albums (AFP)	34
Scottish Albums (OCC)	11
Swiss Albums (Schweizer Hitparade)	61
