= Four Songs (Blood Orange EP) =

EP by Blood Orange
- Released: 16 September 2022
- Length: 11:23
- Label: RCA
- Producer: Devonté Hynes

Blood Orange chronology
Angel's Pulse (2019)	Four Songs (2022)	Essex Honey (2025)

Singles from Four Songs
- 1. "Jesus Freak Lighter" Released: 8 September 2022

Four Songs is an extended play by Dev Hynes as Blood Orange. It was released via RCA Records on 16 September 2022, and is his first release with RCA Records. The EP was preceded by the lead single, "Jesus Freak Lighter", released on 8 September 2022.

== Critical reception ==
Ryan Dillon of Glide Magazine called Four Songs "a great welcome-back present for long-time fans", saying, "The short yet efficient project gives us a hint as to where Hynes is going creatively", and points out how Blood Orange is "experimenting with different song structures and vocal tones to create a more atmospheric sound." James Greig of Dazed says the EP "feels like vintage Blood Orange: downbeat, sultry, sharply produced and a little melancholy in parts."

== Track listing ==
Four Songs track listing
No.	Title	Length
1.	"Jesus Freak Lighter"	2:32
2.	"Something You Know"	2:45
3.	"Wish"	3:01
4.	"Relax and Run" (featuring Erika de Casier and Eva Tolkin)	3:05
Total length:		11:23
