= Angel's Pulse =

Mixtape by Blood Orange
- Released: 12 July 2019
- Length: 32:26
- Label: Domino
- Producer: Devonté Hynes

Blood Orange chronology
| Negro Swan (2018) | Angel's Pulse (2019) | Four Songs (2022) |

Singles from Angel's Pulse
- 1. "Benzo" Released: 2019; 2. "Dark & Handsome" Released: 2019

Angel's Pulse is a mixtape by Dev Hynes as Blood Orange. It was released via Domino Recording Company on 12 July 2019. It was his first release following his fourth studio album Negro Swan (2018). Originally released digitally, it was later released on compact disc, vinyl, and cassette tape on 4 October 2019.

== Promotion ==
At The Late Late Show with James Corden on 16 April 2019, Dev Hynes performed "Something to Do" and "Dark & Handsome" for the first time.

A music video for "Benzo" was released on 15 July 2019. It was directed by Dev Hynes himself. In the video, Ian Isiah portrays as an aristocrat, while Hynes portrays as a cellist. A music video for "Dark & Handsome" was released on 28 October 2019. Directed by Dev Hynes, the video includes a brief appearance from Toro y Moi, who is also featured on the song.

== Critical reception ==
Professional ratings
Aggregate scores
| Source | Rating |
|---|---|
| Metacritic | 73/100 |
Review scores
| Source | Rating |
| AllMusic | 3.5/5 stars |
| Clash | 8/10 |
| DIY | 4/5 stars |
| Exclaim! | 7/10 |
| The Guardian | 3/5 stars |
| The Observer | 3/5 stars |
| Pitchfork | 8.0/10 |
| PopMatters | 7/10 stars |

At Metacritic, which assigns a weighted average score out of 100 to reviews from mainstream critics, the mixtape received an average score of 73, based on 7 reviews, indicating "generally favorable reviews".

Ann-Derrick Gaillot of Pitchfork gave the mixtape an 8.0 out of 10, writing, "while 2016's Freetown Sound and 2018's Negro Swan are cinematic both in their production and overarching themes, Angel's Pulse, Blood Orange's shortest collection of songs, feels like scanning radio stations in a lovingly nostalgic memory straight from the '90s and early '00s." Wilf Skinner of Clash described it as "a short mix of impressionistic sketches chock-full of collabs and spanning all manner of genres."

== Track listing ==
| No. | Title | Length |
|---|---|---|
| 1. | "I Wanna C U" | 1:14 |
| 2. | "Something to Do" | 0:51 |
| 3. | "Dark & Handsome" (featuring Toro y Moi) | 2:33 |
| 4. | "Benzo" | 2:30 |
| 5. | "Birmingham" (featuring Kelsey Lu and Ian Isiah) | 1:33 |
| 6. | "Good for You" (featuring Justine Skye) | 2:22 |
| 7. | "Baby Florence (Figure)" | 2:57 |
| 8. | "Gold Teeth" (featuring Project Pat, Gangsta Boo, and Tinashe) | 3:01 |
| 9. | "Berlin" (featuring Porches and Ian Isiah) | 1:58 |
| 10. | "Tuesday Feeling (Choose to Stay)" (featuring Tinashe) | 2:57 |
| 11. | "Seven Hours Part 1" (featuring Benny Revival) | 2:40 |
| 12. | "Take It Back" (featuring Arca, Joba, and Justine Skye) | 4:22 |
| 13. | "Happiness" | 2:09 |
| 14. | "Today" | 1:19 |

== Personnel ==
Credits adapted from liner notes.

- Devonté Hynes – vocals, guitar (1–3, 6, 9, 10), bass guitar (1, 3, 4, 8–13), keyboards (1, 3, 5, 6, 9, 11), arrangement (3–9), drum programming (3, 4, 6–13), cello (4, 7), Rhodes piano (4, 10), synthesizer (6, 8, 10–14), double bass (7), sampler (7, 8), drums (10, 13), piano (12, 13), Moog synthesizer (13), production, mixing, art direction, design
- Ian Isiah – vocals (1, 4, 5, 9, 13, 14)
- Porches – guitar (1), drums (1), vocals (9)
- Toro y Moi – vocals (3)
- Eva – vocals (4)
- Jason Arce – saxophone (4)
- Kelsey Lu – vocals (5)
- Bryndon Cook – keyboards (5)
- Justine Skye – vocals (6, 12)
- Ex Reyes – piano (6, 9), Moog synthesizer (6)
- Project Pat – vocals (8)
- Gangsta Boo – vocals (8)
- Tinashe – vocals (8, 10)
- Benny Revival – vocals (11)
- David Ginyard – bass guitar (11)
- Arca – vocals (12)
- Joba – vocals (12)
- Dave Cooley – mastering
- Matthew Cooper – design
- Flurina Rothenberger – cover photography

== Charts ==
| Chart (2019) | Peak position |
|---|---|
| Lithuanian Albums (AGATA) | 72 |
| UK R&B Albums (Official Charts) | 33 |
| US Billboard 200 | 163 |
| US Independent Albums (Billboard) | 40 |
| US Top Alternative Albums (Billboard) | 14 |
