= Otherness (Kindness album) =

Studio album by Kindness
- Released: 13 October 2014
- Length: 46:13
- Label: Female Energy; Mom + Pop

Kindness chronology
World, You Need a Change of Mind (2012)	Otherness (2014)	Something Like a War (2019)

Professional ratings
Aggregate scores
Source	Rating
AnyDecentMusic?	6.4/10
Metacritic	68/100
Review scores
Source	Rating
AllMusic	2.5/5 stars
Clash	7/10
Consequence of Sound	B-
DIY	2/5 stars
Drowned in Sound	5/10

Otherness is the second studio album by English musician Adam Bainbridge, under their solo project Kindness. It was released on October 13, 2014 through Mom + Pop Music and Female Energy.

== Critical reception ==
Otherness was met with generally favourable reviews from critics. At Metacritic, which assigns a weighted average rating out of 100 to reviews from mainstream publications, this release received an average score of 68, based on 18 reviews.

=== Accolades ===
Accolades for Otherness
Publication	Accolade	Rank	Ref.
Dummy Mag	Top 20 Albums of 2014	2	
Gigwise	Top 50 Albums of 2014	36	
The Guardian	Top 40 Albums of 2014	27	
Pigeons & Planes	Top 50 Albums of 2014	41	

== Track listing ==
Otherness track listing
No.	Title	Length
1.	"World Restart" (featuring Kelela Mizanekristos)	4:39
2.	"This Is Not About Us"	3:20
3.	"I'll Be Back" (featuring Sam Beste)	5:18
4.	"Who Do You Love?" (featuring Bob Blank, Lola Blank and Robin Carlsson)	4:51
5.	"8th Wonder" (featuring M.anifest)	5:12
6.	"With You" (featuring Anne Dudley, Trevor Horn, J.J. Jeczalik, Gary Langan, Kelela Mizanekristos and Paul Morley)	4:03
7.	"Geneva"	5:46
8.	"For the Young" (featuring Herbie Hancock and Foday Musa Suso)	3:14
9.	"Why Don't You Love Me" (featuring Devonté Hynes and Tawiah)	4:05
10.	"It'll Be OK"	5:45

== Charts ==
Chart performance for Otherness
Chart (2014)	Peak position
US Heatseekers Albums (Billboard)	45
