= Fai Khadra =

American designer and model (born 1991)

- Born: Faisal Khadra; September 9, 1991 (age 35); Los Angeles, California, US
- Education: American School of Dubai
- Occupations: Model; designer

Fai Khadra (born September 9, 1991) is an American designer and model

== Early life and education ==
Khadra was born in Los Angeles, California, but was raised in Riyadh, London, and Dubai. He has identical twin sisters Simi and Haze Khadra, who are DJs collectively known as "SimiHaze". His father is a collector and his mother owns a lifestyle boutique in Saudi Arabia called The Art of Living. Khadra received a degree in architecture from the American School of Dubai. Khadra is of Palestinian descent and is a supporter of Palestinian statehood.

== Career ==
In 2017, Khadra appeared in the music video for Charli XCX's single Boys. In 2018, Khadra co-wrote "Runnin'", a song by Blood Orange on his fourth album, Negro Swan, and Khadra's vocals were featured on "Runnin'" and three other songs on the album. In 2019, he co-wrote Justine Skye's song "Maybe".

In November 2020, Khadra served as a guest curator for Sotheby's. Khadra created a contemporary collection, designed to be "more inviting to younger audiences."

In January 2022, Khadra collaborated with Oliver Peoples in designing an eyewear collection. It was the first time Oliver Peoples collaborated with an individual. The Fai Style sunglasses were available in five colors and were designed to "look good on everyone." Khadra promoted the sunglasses by hosting a dinner on helipad in Los Angeles.

In February 2022, Khadra displayed a sculpture at the Los Angeles art show, "Vessels," in which Khadra carved a sculpture out of the ground. That same month, Khadra participated in a campaign for Ralph Lauren's fragrance, Ralph's Club. He appeared in a campaign video for the fragrance alongside Gigi Hadid, Lucky Blue Smith, and Luka Sabbat.

In April 2023, Khadra joined Dior Beauty's Gris Dior Collective. In October 2023, Khadra walked in Balenciaga's Spring 24 fashion show in Paris.
