= Cupid Deluxe =

Studio album by Blood Orange
- Released: 18 November 2013
- Recorded: 2011–2013; New York City
- Genre: R&B; new wave; funk; disco; soul
- Length: 51:10
- Label: Domino
- Producer: Devonté Hynes

Blood Orange chronology
Coastal Grooves (2011)	Cupid Deluxe (2013)	Freetown Sound (2016)

Singles from Cupid Deluxe
- 1. "Chamakay" Released: 12 September 2013; 2. "You're Not Good Enough" Released: 12 November 2013; 3. "Time Will Tell" Released: 18 November 2013

Professional ratings
Aggregate scores
Source	Rating
AnyDecentMusic?	7.5/10
Metacritic	75/100
Review scores
Source	Rating
AllMusic	3.5/5 stars
Chicago Tribune	3/4 stars
The Guardian	4/5 stars
The Independent	4/5 stars
Los Angeles Times	3/4 stars
NME	6/10
Pitchfork	8.5/10
Rolling Stone	3.5/5 stars
Spin	8/10
Vice	B+

Cupid Deluxe is the second studio album by Dev Hynes as Blood Orange, and is the follow-up to 2011's Coastal Grooves. The album was released on 18 November 2013 in the UK, and was available worldwide a week earlier on iTunes on 12 November 2013.

Between albums, Hynes has written and produced music for the likes of Solange, Sky Ferreira, MKS, and more.

Cupid Deluxe shows a more expansive aural palette than the previous release Coastal Grooves, while still retaining the pop sensibilities that Hynes has showcased since his days in Test Icicles and Lightspeed Champion. The album features many guest appearances, including performances from David Longstreth (Dirty Projectors), Caroline Polachek (Chairlift), Samantha Urbani (Friends), Clams Casino, Despot, Adam Bainbridge (Kindness), Skepta and more. The album was streamed in full on Hynes' own YouTube channel on 5 November 2013.

Speaking about the album, Hynes said it was inspired by "New York City, the Big Apple. I lived in Brooklyn for some time and finally made the leap into Manhattan. So a lot of the record is about that, transitions, life transitions. Moving from a stable position to an unstable position. Something we have all been through."

Pitchfork Media ranked the record 35th among their top 200 albums of the 2010s article.

== Track listing ==
All tracks are written by Devonté Hynes, except "Always Let U Down" written by Paul Draper and Dominic Chad.

Standard edition CD, LP, Digital Download
No.	Title	Length
1.	"Chamakay"	4:20
2.	"You're Not Good Enough"	4:21
3.	"Uncle ACE"	4:17
4.	"No Right Thing"	4:11
5.	"It Is What It Is"	5:07
6.	"Chosen"	6:45
7.	"Clipped On (feat. Despot)"	3:11
8.	"Always Let U Down"	5:14
9.	"On the Line"	5:07
10.	"High Street"	2:58
11.	"Time Will Tell"	5:39

"Always Let U Down" is a cover of I Can Only Disappoint U by the English alternative rock band Mansun from their album Little Kix (2000).

== Personnel ==
- Devonté Hynes – vocals, main instrumentation, composition, arrangement
- Despot – vocals on "Clipped On"
- Dave Longstreth – vocals on "No Right Thing"
- Caroline Polachek – vocals on "Chamakay", backing vocals and spoken part at the beginning on "Chosen"
- Samantha Urbani – vocals on "You're Not Good Enough", "No Right Thing", "It Is What It Is", "Chosen", "Always Let U Down", "On The Line", "Time Will Tell"
- Skepta – vocals on "High Street"
- Clams Casino – additional production on "No Right Thing"
- David "DJ" Ginyard – bass
- Jason Arce – saxophones and clarinet
- Adam Bainbridge (Kindness) – saxophone arrangement, vocals and drum tracks on "On The Line", "Time Will Tell"
- Mikaelin 'Blue' Bluespruce – engineer
- Tawiah – vocals on "Time Will Tell"
- Sam Beste – piano on "Time Will Tell"
- Blue May – guitar on "Time Will Tell"
