= Essex Honey =

Studio album by Blood Orange
- Released: 29 August 2025
- Length: 46:43
- Label: RCA; Domino
- Producer: Devonté Hynes

Blood Orange chronology
Four Songs (2022)	Essex Honey (2025)

Singles from Essex Honey
- 1. "The Field" Released: 26 June 2025; 2. "Somewhere in Between" / "Mind Loaded" Released: 17 July 2025; 3. "Countryside" Released: 27 August 2025

Essex Honey is the fifth studio album by English musician Dev Hynes, under his stage name Blood Orange. It was released on 29 August 2025 through a joint venture between Domino and RCA Records.

The album follows the 2022 EP Four Songs and marks his first full-length studio release since 2018's Negro Swan. It features contributions from Lorde, The Durutti Column, Caroline Polachek, Daniel Caesar, Mustafa the Poet, Brendan Yates of Turnstile, Ben Watt of Everything but the Girl, Naomi Scott, Amandla Stenberg and Zadie Smith, amongst others.

== Background and promotion ==
Essex Honey is Dev Hynes' debut studio album on RCA Records following his signing with the label in September 2022. In a May 2024 interview with Esquire, he first revealed that he was working on new material. The album was created during a period of grief and reflection on his upbringing in Essex, intertwined with how music has inspired and healed him throughout his life. Hynes aims to process these emotions amid a cultural moment marked by "collective grief and loss", seeking resolution and acceptance. The record is described as a personal exploration of grief and his Essex roots, and incorporates nods to artists such as Elliott Smith, The Replacements and his own earlier work. Hynes self-produced and wrote the album, with songwriting contributions from the featured artists.

The album announcement on 17 July 2025 coincided with the release of the dual single, "Somewhere in Between" and "Mind Loaded". The lead single, "The Field" was released on 26 June 2025. Prior to this, Hynes had announced U.S. tour dates for September 2025, alongside European and UK shows scheduled for the fall, including a pair of residency performances in Toronto and Brooklyn respectively.

== Critical reception ==
Professional ratings
Aggregate scores
Source	Rating
AnyDecentMusic?	8.1/10
Metacritic	88/100
Review scores
Source	Rating
AllMusic	4.5/5 stars
The Arts Desk	5/5 stars
Clash	8/10
DIY	4/5 stars
The Guardian	5/5 stars
MusicOMH	4.5/5 stars
NME	4/5 stars
Pitchfork	8.1/10
Rolling Stone	4/5 stars
Slant Magazine	3.5/5 stars

According to the review aggregator Metacritic, Essex Honey received "universal acclaim" based on a weighted average score of 88 out of 100 from fifteen critic scores.

Bijan Stephen of The Nation praised the album's themes of loss and described it as "wonderfully vulnerable and occasionally joyous".

== Track listing ==
Essex Honey track listing
No.	Title	Writer(s)	Length
1.	"Look at You"	Devonté Hynes	3:00
2.	"Thinking Clean"	Hynes	3:35
3.	"Somewhere in Between"	Hynes	3:23
4.	"The Field" (featuring The Durutti Column, Tariq Al-Sabir, Caroline Polachek, and Daniel Caesar)	Hynes; Tariq Al-Sabir; Caroline Polachek; Vini Reilly; Ashton Simmonds	3:19
5.	"Mind Loaded" (featuring Caroline Polachek, Lorde, and Mustafa)	Hynes; Mustafa Ahmed; Polachek; Ella Yelich-O'Connor	3:37
6.	"Vivid Light"	Hynes	4:23
7.	"Countryside" (featuring Eva Tolkin, Liam Benzvi, and Ian Isiah)	Hynes; Liam Benzvi; Georgia Hubley; Ian Isiah; Ira Kaplan; James McNew; Eva Tolkin	3:13
8.	"The Last of England"	Hynes	3:54
9.	"Life" (featuring Tirzah and Charlotte Dos Santos)	Hynes; Tirzah Mastin; Charlotte Dos Santos	2:53
10.	"Westerberg" (featuring Eva Tolkin and Liam Benzvi)	Hynes; Benzvi; Christopher Mars; Thomas Stinson; Tolkin; Paul Westerberg	3:27
11.	"The Train (King's Cross)" (featuring Caroline Polachek)	Hynes; Polachek	2:49
12.	"Scared of It" (featuring Brendan Yates and Ben Watt)	Hynes; Ben Watt; Brendan Yates	2:42
13.	"I Listened (Every Night)"	Hynes; Lotti Golden; Richard Scher	3:36
14.	"I Can Go" (featuring Mabe Fratti and Mustafa)	Hynes; Ahmed; María Belén Fratti Sierra	2:52
Total length:			46:43

== Personnel ==
Credits adapted from Tidal.

- Devonté Hynes – vocals, production, mixing, engineering
- Mikaelin Bluespruce – mixing
- Heba Kadry – mastering
- Alec Fellman – engineering (tracks 2–4, 6–8, 13)
- Evie Clark-Yospa – engineering (3–5)
- Jim-E Stack – engineering (5)
- Migui Maloles – engineering (5)
- Eva Tolkin – background vocals (4)
- Katharina Korbjuhn – art, design & layout

== Charts ==
Chart performance for Essex Honey
Chart (2025)	Peak position
Australian Albums (ARIA)	64
Belgian Albums (Ultratop Flanders)	63
Belgian Albums (Ultratop Wallonia)	113
French Albums (SNEP)	115
French Rock & Metal Albums (SNEP)	9
New Zealand Albums (RMNZ)	33
Portuguese Albums (AFP)	104
Scottish Albums (OCC)	19
Swiss Albums (Schweizer Hitparade)	43
UK Albums (OCC)	69
US Top Album Sales (Billboard)	41
