= Tei Shi =

Canadian singer, songwriter and record producer (born 1989)

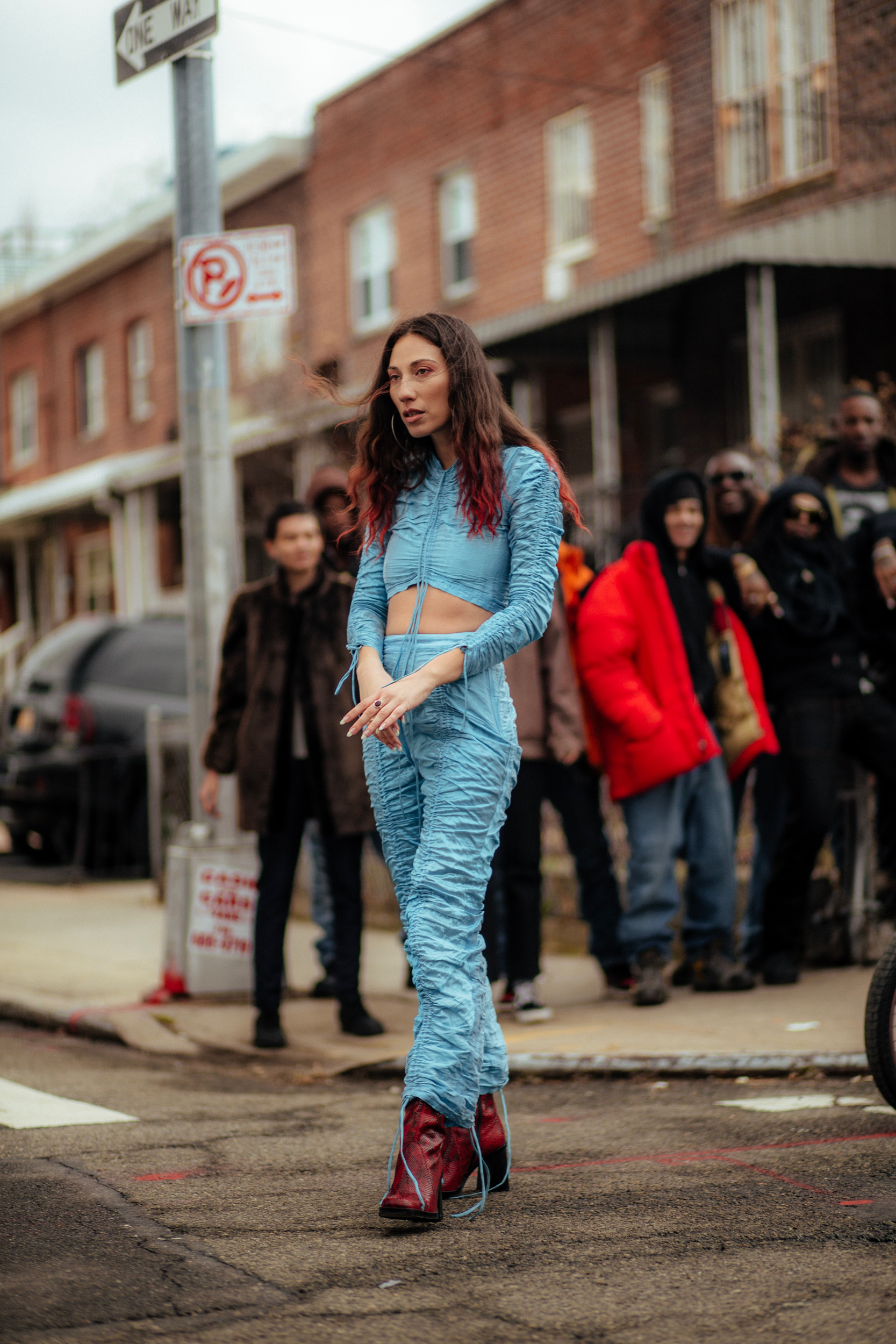
- Tei Shi on set for Blood Orange's music video "Hope" featuring Puff Daddy.

Background information
- Born: Valerie Teicher Barbosa; 4 October 1989 (age 36); Buenos Aires, Argentina
- Origin: Bogotá, Colombia Vancouver, British Columbia, Canada
- Genres: Indie pop; alternative R&B; art pop; synth-pop
- Occupations: Singer; songwriter; record producer
- Instrument: Vocals
- Years active: 2013–present
- Labels: Downtown; Geffen
- Website: teishi.world

Valerie Teicher Barbosa (born 4 October 1989), best known by her stage name Tei Shi, is an Argentine-Colombian-Canadian, singer, songwriter, and record producer based in New York City. She released her first singles and music videos in 2013, also performing live for the first time at CMJ. Tei Shi released her debut extended play, Saudade, in November 2013, which Noisey described as a "layered masterpiece of melodies... expertly entwined vocal loops, and shivery sonics."

In 2014, she released two singles: "Adder(f)all" and a cover of Beyoncé's "No Angel". She was also a guest artist on the track "Holiest" by Glass Animals, an English indie rock band. Her second extended play, Verde, was released in 2015. Her debut album, Crawl Space, was released on March 31, 2017, and her sophomore LP La Linda on November 17, 2019. On July 17, 2020, Tei Shi released the EP "Die 4 Ur Love", with a deluxe version following on December 11, 2020. On June 16, 2022, Tei Shi released the single "GRIP", her first release as a fully independent artist.

== Early life ==
Teicher was born in Buenos Aires, Argentina to Colombian parents. After spending her childhood in Bogotá, her family later moved to Vancouver, British Columbia, Canada. She is the granddaughter of Holocaust survivors and was raised Jewish. She attended Berklee College of Music in Boston, Massachusetts, and afterwards moved to New York City.

== Music career ==
=== 2013–2014: First singles and Saudade ===
In the summer of 2013 Tei Shi released her first single, which she announced would later appear on her upcoming debut EP. Titled "M&Ms", Dummy Magazine called the single "transportive and exceedingly gorgeous," stating "minimal background instrumentation is limited to an echoing drum track, mouth organs and a few lonely guitar bits, but they provide a solid framework for her soft, cooing a cappella." A video was released along with the song, and directed by singer-songwriter Grimes' brother Mac Boucher.

She performed her first shows in the fall of 2013, playing at CMJ. According to Noisey, she loops live vocals during her set to create a layered effect.

External videos
- Tei Shi - "Even If it Hurts" featuring Blood Orange (Official Video) (September 27, 2019)
- Tei Shi - "Nevermind The End" (Official Video) on Noisey (March 6, 2014)

On November 1, 2013, she released the second promo song for the EP, titled "Nevermind the End". The Fader called the track "slinky" and "more traditionally structured" than her first song. Kim Taylor Bennett of Noisey described the track as one of the "best seven songs" of 2013, and praised her lyrics, harmonies, and tonal buildup. Hypetrak wrote that Tei Shi's "airy" vocals "contrastingly bump well with the heavy production and hints of charming synth pop."

A third promo single, "Nature Vs. Nurture", was released on November 5, 2013. Stereogum wrote that the track is a "cascading bedroom-R&B and future pop track that evolves from quiet, but dizzying layers of harmonies into fleshed out vocal rounds with a Tropcalía-tinged backbone."

"Saudade tips the scales to the sad side, but is all the more soul-crushingly beautiful for it... Tei Shi range is tonally akin to Feist and Lianne La Havas, and what's so goosebump-inducingly awesome about this EP is its range... Elegant, elegiac, and sensual, Saudade, is both excellently titled and the best thing we've heard all fall."
— Noisey

Tei Shi released her six-track debut EP Saudade, on November 12, 2013. Among her collaborators was her friend producer/writer Gianluca Buccellati, who she had met while a student at Berklee. The word "saudade" is Portuguese, describing a sentimental yearning for someone or for the happiness of a former place or time. Her previous singles were included on the EP, as well as several new tracks. According to Noisey, it is a "layered masterpiece of melodies that duck and dive, expertly entwined vocal loops, and shivery sonics." Saudade later received a physical release in 2015 through the indie label Turntable Kitchen.

In January 2014, Tei Shi released her first single from Saudade, Adder(f)all", as a free mp3. She told Rolling Stone that the song resulted from three different song ideas joined. "Instead of making a really structured song I just looped these three sections/melody lines over one another, building them up and layering with harmonies. It was originally a capella and when the instrumentals were added it really came into its own." In the same month a remix of "Closer (Heart Shaped Birthmark Remix)" by Spirals hit the blogosphere with the prominent blog Kick Kick Snare stating, "SPIRALs has found a way to make something already so smooth into a beautifully jagged juxtaposition of a mixture. A robotic end to a beautiful romance."

"We originally wanted to work with Tei Shi because she has an amazing voice and this modern New York R&B thing. We sent her a couple beats... and she sent back the great vocal you hear in the song, about both loving and hating something all at the same time."
— Dave Bayley of Glass Animals (2014)

She released her second music video in March 2014 for the track "Nevermind the End". Also in March 2014 she was a featured guest on the track "Holiest" by Glass Animals, an English indie rock band. She sings a duet with Glass Animals' Dave Bayley, with both voices representing the perspectives of different characters. Under the Radar called her vocal performance "delicate", with Vogue describing them as "airy and minimalist [and] R&B-inflected."

In summer of 2014 she collaborated with Gianluca Buccellati, and together they arranged and recorded a cover of "No Angel" by Beyoncé. Wrote Stereogum, "In her cover, Tei Shi keeps the song's lovesick drift intact but adds all these trickly little bloop-pop flourishes." The Fader described the cover as an "'80s-leaning take", stating that "breezy vocals and glowing synths were made for this role."

=== 2015: Verde EP ===
Tei Shi's second EP, Verde, was released digitally on April 14, 2015. Verde later received a physical release on May 5, 2015, through Mermaid Avenue and internationally via Double Denim Records and Caroline Australia. The EP's first single, "Bassically", was released on February 11, 2015. "Bassically" was extremely well-received, accumulating over seven million streams on Spotify and spawning remixes from Body Language and Honne. Canadian singer Grimes called "Bassically" "one of the best pop songs of 2050". The music video for "Bassically" was directed by Nicolas Pesce and released on February 11, 2015. The video features Tei Shi and a gang of female rebels engaging in firefights around NYC. Tei Shi explained "I wanted the video to look like what the song sounds like – fun and empowering without taking itself too seriously. So we created a fun fictional comic world with a troop of bad ass girls".

The second single from Verde, "See Me", received a music video on August 20, 2015, directed by Dreamtiger and Jonathan Wing. The video was shot in Bogotá, where Tei Shi spent much of her childhood. Speaking about shooting the video, the artist explained "It was a combination of the familiar and the new for me. More than just being a music video, it was an experience that tied in really fittingly with the song for me personally."

"Get It", the third and final single from Verde, had its own music video released on December 8, 2015. Directed by Dreamtiger, the music video serves up footage of Saturn from NASA's 2004 Cassini mission as a background for Tei Shi herself.

=== 2017: Crawl Space ===
Tei Shi spent much of 2015 and 2016 playing major festivals like Electric Forest and Coachella, as well as opening for fellow musicians Years & Years, Jungle, and Grimes. During this time, she also began work on her first full-fledged album, Crawl Space, and signed a new record deal with Downtown Records.

Tei Shi's debut album, Crawl Space, was officially released on March 31, 2017, through Downtown Records. The title of the album is derived from a "crawl space" she used as a child to confront a fear of the dark.

On January 27, 2017, the first single from Crawl Space, "Keep Running", was released digitally with an accompanying music video directed by Agostina Gálvez. The songs "How Far" and "Justify" were also released before the album as the second and third singles. "Say You Do" was released as the album's fourth single, it was accompanied by remixes and an official music video.

=== 2019: La Linda ===
On June 5, 2019, Tei Shi previewed a new song, "A Kiss Goodbye", on an Instagram live stream. The next day, the full song was released digitally, accompanied by a lyric video, as the lead single from her sophomore album. Pitchfork described the song as Bossa nova-inspired, and noted that '[Tei Shi] seems to have fully stepped into her own'. On July 16, Tei Shi announced the release of the second single from the album, "Red Light", and teased the song in a couple of Instagram posts. The single was released on July 18.

On September 24, Tei Shi announced the release of the third single from the album, "Even If It Hurts", featuring Blood Orange. The single marked the second time the pair had collaborated, following the single "Hope" from Blood Orange's fourth studio album. The single was released on September 27. On the same day, a music video, shot at Untermyer Park in New York and directed by Cara Stricker, premiered via Tei Shi's YouTube channel. On the same day, Tei Shi officially announced the title and tracklist of her sophomore album, "La Linda". She described the album as being inspired by her move from New York to Los Angeles.

The fourth single from the album, "Alone in the Universe", was released on October 25. The song was accompanied by a homemade music video, which featured Tei Shi dancing against a starry backdrop.

Tei Shi's second studio album, La Linda, was released on November 15, 2019, through Downtown Records.

=== 2020: Die 4 Ur Love ===
In December 2019, Tei Shi was announced as the opening act for Blood Orange's 2020 North American tour. However, the tour was cancelled after two dates due to the worsening COVID-19 pandemic in the United States.

On May 7, Tei Shi released the first single from her upcoming EP of the same name, "Die 4 Ur Love". The song was her first release after leaving her previous music label, Downtown Records. Paper described the song as synthpop-inspired. Tei Shi noted the song has a more dark and direct sound, similar to her debut album, Crawl Space. The second single from the EP, "Goodbye", was released on June 26, along details of the EP's title and release date. Goodbye was in part written about Tei Shi's departure from her previous record label.

The full EP, entitled Die 4 Ur Love was released on July 17, 2020, by Diktator Records. The EP was written by Tei Shi in six days while on a writer's retreat in El Paso, Texas in January 2020.

On August 28, 2020, a Spanish language version of "Johnny", the first track on the EP, was released. A music video for the song, directed by Jonatan Lopez, was released in December 2020. This was the first music video for any of Tei Shi's Spanish-language songs. On December 11, 2020, a deluxe version of the EP was released, featuring this track alongside remixes of other tracks from the EP by Empress Of, Buscabulla, and Still Andy.

=== 2025: Make Believe I Make Believe ===
In the fall of 2024, she recorded her fourth studio album, Make Believe I Make Believe, during a one-week retreat on Vancouver Island with collaborators Noah Beresin and Tommy English. She released the album's lead single, "Best Be Leaving", on March 5, 2025. The album's second single, "Drop Dead", was released on April 30, 2025. On June 26, 2025, she released the third single, "222", which features Loyal Lobos.

== Musical style ==
The Fader stated that she is "known for making whisper-y, slow and sensual bedroom pop." Tei Shi jokingly describes her work as its own genre, "mermaid music". In an interview with NY Mag, she stated "personally it's always hard for me to label it as a genre because it shifts and I try to make music that isn't one thing or the other." Her vocal range has been described as soprano.

== Discography ==
=== Studio albums ===
Title	Details
Crawl Space	Release date: March 31, 2017; Label: Downtown; Format: Digital download, LP
La Linda	Release date: November 15, 2019; Label: Downtown; Format: Digital download, CD
Valerie	Release date: April 19, 2024; Label: Self-released; Format: Digital download
Make Believe I Make Believe	Release date: August 29, 2025; Label: Self-released; Format: Digital download

=== EPs ===
Title	Details
Saudade	Released: November 12, 2013; Label: Self-released; Format: Digital download
Verde	Released: April 13, 2015; Label: Self-released; Formats: Digital download, CD, Vinyl
Die 4 Ur Love	Released: July 17, 2020; Label: Diktator; Formats: Digital download
Bad Premonition	Released: March 17, 2023; Label: Self-released; Formats: Digital download

=== Singles ===
Title	Year	Album
"M&Ms"	2013	Saudade
"Nevermind the End"	2013	Saudade
"Nature vs. Nurture"	2013	Saudade
"Adder(f)all"	2014	Saudade
"Bassically"	2015	Verde
"See Me"	2015	Verde
"Get It"	2015	Verde
"Keep Running"	2017	Crawl Space
"How Far"	2017	Crawl Space
"Justify"	2017	Crawl Space
"Say You Do"	2017	Crawl Space
"A Kiss Goodbye"	2019	La Linda
"Red Light"	2019	La Linda
"Even If It Hurts" (featuring Blood Orange)	2019	La Linda
"Alone In The Universe"	2019	La Linda
"Die 4 Ur Love"	2020	Die 4 Ur Love
"Goodbye"	2020	Die 4 Ur Love
"Johnny (Español)"	2020	Die 4 Ur Love (Deluxe)
"Grip"	2022	Bad Premonition and Valerie
"Bad Premonition"	2022	Bad Premonition and Valerie
"¿Quién Te Manda?"	2023	Bad Premonition and Valerie
"Mona Lisa"	2023	Bad Premonition and Valerie
"QQ (Quédate Queriéndome)"	2024	Valerie
"No Falta"	2024	Valerie
"Best Be Leaving"	2025	Make Believe I Make Believe
"Drop Dead"	2025	Make Believe I Make Believe
"222" (featuring Loyal Lobos)	2025	Make Believe I Make Believe

=== Guest appearances ===
Year	Title	Primary artist(s)	Album	Release details
2014	"Holiest" (featuring Tei Shi)	Glass Animals	Glass Animals EP	Harvest (March 2014)
2015	"Arrest Me" (featuring Tei Shi)	Shy Girls	4WZ EP	Self-released (February 2015)
2015	"Best On" (featuring Tei Shi)	Luca	Singles Only: Vol 1 EP	Downtown (June 2016)
2018	"Hope" (featuring Puff Daddy and Tei Shi)	Blood Orange	Negro Swan	Domino (August 2018)
2020	"Tessellate"	BAYNK & Tei Shi	A Study In Movement - EP	AllPoints/Believe (June 2020)
2023	"I Know You're Happy"	John Cale	Mercy	Double Six Records (January 2023)

== See also ==
- List of singer-songwriters
