= Kindness (musician) =

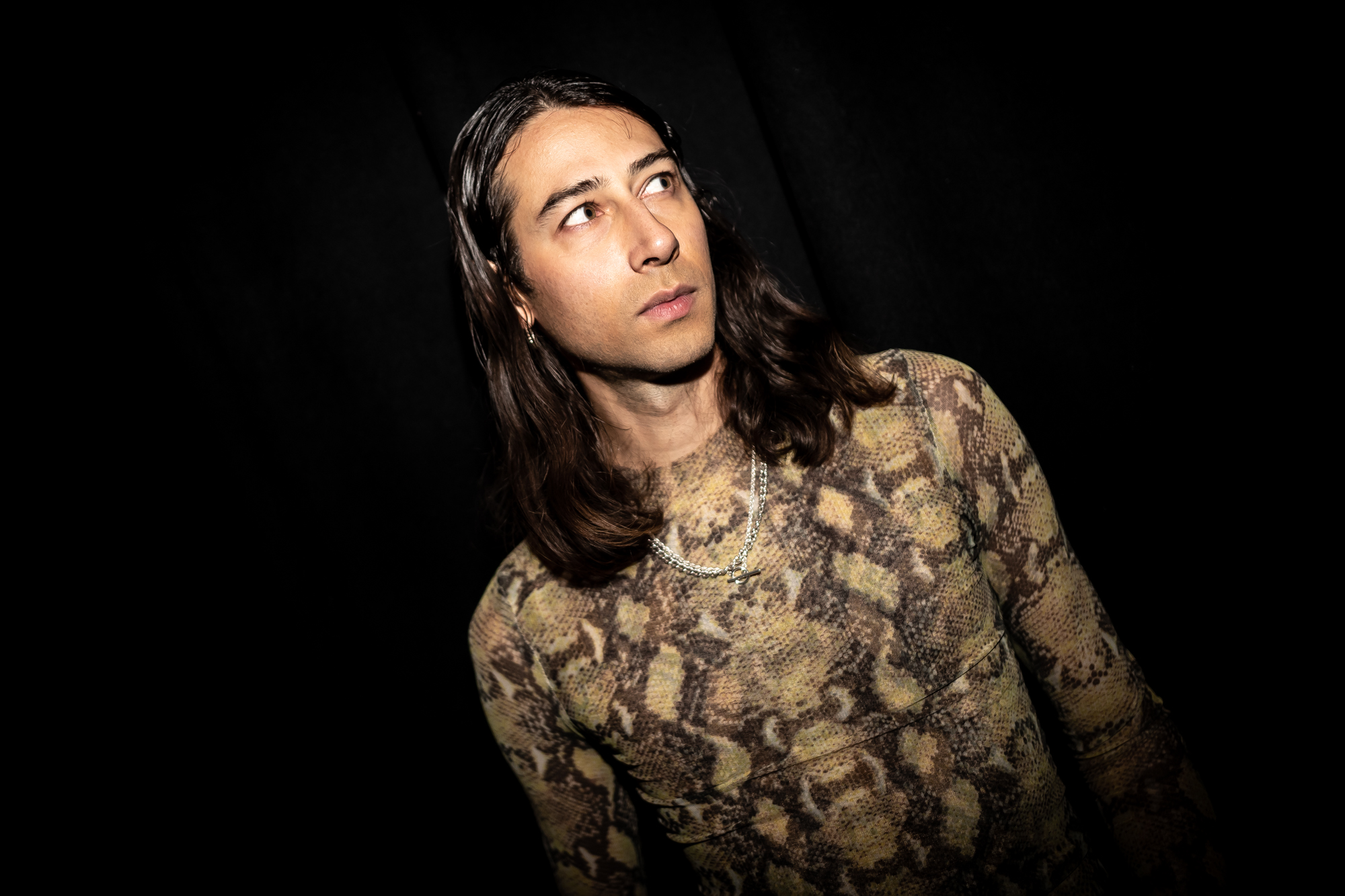
- Kindness in 2019

Background information
- Birth name: Adam Bainbridge
- Born: 7 May 1982 (age 43); Peterborough, England
- Genres: Electronica, synthpop, disco, lo-fi, indietronica, downtempo
- Occupation(s): Singer-songwriter, musician, director
- Years active: 2009–present
- Labels: Female Energy, Terrible Records, Casablanca Records
- Website: kindness.es

Kindness is the solo project of English singer Adam Bainbridge.

== History ==
In 2007, Adam Bainbridge was a recipient of the Eric James Johnson Memorial Fellowship, at The Philadelphia Institute for Advance Study.

Live in Philly was Adam Bainbridge's contribution to the Eric James Johnson Memorial Fellowship program. It consists of an album recorded during their stay at the Institute in May 2007, and a small pamphlet illustrating the work, typeset by hand. Employing a variety of musicians from the Institute and the rest of Philadelphia, as well as sound sources and records found or recorded in the city, the Kindness album is a personal and welcome contribution to the Institute's body of work.

— The Philadelphia Institute for Advance Study

Live in Philly was released in 2007 as a free MP3 download and CDr, with no label.

In 2009, Moshi Moshi Records released Kindness debut single Swingin’ Party. Gee Up was included on the vinyl b-side and a VHS video directed by Jack Latham accompanied it.

In October 2011, Cyan was released as a limited edition 12" vinyl through Kindness's own record label Female Energy in the UK and Terrible Records in North America. The B-side contained 3 unnamed lock grooves.

Kindness's debut album, World, You Need a Change of Mind, co-produced & mixed by Grammy Award-winning producer Philippe Zdar was released on 16 March 2012. Live sessions were recorded for Radio 1's Zane Lowe and Rob da Bank as well as BBC Radio 6 Music's Lauren Laverne, Live from Maida Vale. Kindness also played the iTunes Festival 2012.

In 2013, Kindness contributed to production and instrumentation on Blood Orange's Cupid Deluxe.

On 13 October 2014, Kindness released their second album Otherness featuring contributions from Robyn, Dev Hynes, Kelela and more.

During a 2015 lecture for Red Bull Music Academy, Kindness discussed their recent music career, and their gender identity and sexuality.

'World Restart' from 2014's Otherness is the theme to the New York Times podcast, Still Processing.

== Live ==
As a live band, Kindness has performed at a number of festivals and headline shows through the world including South by Southwest, Latitude Festival, Printemps De Bourges, Sydney Opera House, Primavera Festival, Field Day Festival, Eurockennes, Calvi on The Rocks, Oya Festival, Way Out West, Flow Festival, Summer Sonic, Bestival, We Love Green, Les in Rocks Festival, Midi Festival, and Soulwaxmas.

In May and June 2013, Kindness supported The xx as part of their Night and Day Festival in London and Berlin.

2014 saw a North American and worldwide tour.

Kindness was a support for Blood Orange's charity concert for Opus 118 School Of Music at the Apollo Theater in New York.

== DJ ==
Bainbridge originally came to produce music from work as a DJ. As a DJ, Bainbridge has opened for Giorgio Moroder, Solange and Mannie Fresh, and at venues & clubs worldwide including the Guggenheim Museum, Panorama Bar, MoMA PS1, the Apollo Theater, the Met Museum, Palais de Tokyo, Rex Club, Liquidroom Tokyo and the Los Angeles Museum of Contemporary Art.

Bainbridge's mixes have featured on British and international radio, and on specialist shows, such as the long-running Beats in Space.

== Journalism ==
Kindness has also interviewed other artists for print media, such as interviews for Saint Heron. In May 2018, Kindness interviewed Robyn for an RBMA lecture on her career and music.

== Personal life ==
Bainbridge identifies as gender non-conforming and uses they/them pronouns.

Amina Desai (c. 1920 – 10 June 2009) was Bainbridge's grandmother. John Blacking (1928 – 1990) was Bainbridge's uncle.

== Video director ==
Adam Bainbridge has directed and co-directed a number of videos for their own Kindness project as well as for other artists, including Grizzly Bear, Blood Orange, and William Onyeabor:

| Artist | Song | Director(s) |
|---|---|---|
| Grizzly Bear | "Don't Ask" (Final Fantasy Version) | Adam Bainbridge |
| Kindness | "Gee Up" | Adam Bainbridge |
| Kindness | "House" | Adam Bainbridge & Dan Brereton |
| Kindness & Trouble Funk | "That's Alright" | Adam Bainbridge |
| Kindness | "36 Hours in the Go-Go Scene" | Adam Bainbridge & Pauline Beaudemont |
| Blood Orange | "Chamakay" | Adam Bainbridge |
| William Onyeabor | "Fantastic Man" | Adam Bainbridge & Camilla Wasserman |
| Blood Orange | "Uncle ACE" (Kindness remix) | Adam Bainbridge |
| Oh Shu | "Disco Brasil" | Adam Bainbridge |

== Discography ==
=== Studio albums ===
- World, You Need a Change of Mind (16 March 2012)
- Otherness (13 October 2014)
- Something Like a War (6 September 2019)

=== Singles ===
- "Swingin Party" (28 September 2009)
- "Cyan" (26 October 2011)
- "SEOD" (8 February 2012)
- "Gee Up" (16 March 2012)
- "House" (15 June 2012)
- "That's Alright" (21 September 2012)
- "World Restart" (featuring Kelela and Ade) (12 August 2014)
- "This Is Not About Us" (4 September 2014)
- "Who Do You Love?" (featuring Robyn) (2 January 2015)
- "Cry Everything" (featuring Robyn) (7 March 2019)
- "Lost Without" (featuring Seinabo Sey) (30 April 2019)
- "Hard to Believe" (featuring Jazmine Sullivan) (11 June 2019)

=== Remixes ===
- "Blood Orange – Uncle Ace" (Kindness remix feat. Robert Owens) (10 April 2014)
- "Röyksopp & Robyn – Monument" (Kindness remix feat. Busiswa) (15 August 2014)
- "Kelela – Kate for Me" (4 January 2016)
- "Kelela – Wheel the High" (4 January 2016)
- "Robyn – Got Her Own Thing From Sweden" (11 April 2019)
- "Robyn – Chic It Immediately" (11 April 2019)
- "Shivum Sharma – Diamond" (Kindness remix) (25 August 2020)
- "Blue Mena – Jewels" (Kindness remix) (27 September 2024)

=== Production discography ===
| Title | Year | Artist(s) | Album | Credits | Written with | Produced with |
|---|---|---|---|---|---|---|
| "Chosen" | 2013 | Blood Orange | Cupid Deluxe | Saxophone arrangement | Devonté Hynes | — |
| "On the Line" | 2013 | Blood Orange | Cupid Deluxe | Background vocals, keyboards, and bass | Devonté Hynes | Devonté Hynes |
| "Time Will Tell" | 2013 | Blood Orange | Cupid Deluxe | Drums | — | — |
| "By Ourselves" | 2016 | Blood Orange | Freetown Sound | Co-writing | Devonté Hynes, Charles Mingus, and Ashlee Haze | — |
| "Thank You" | 2016 | Blood Orange | Freetown Sound | Co-writing, production, drums, sampling | Devonté Hynes and Rodney Franklin | Devonté Hynes |
| "Cranes in the Sky" | 2016 | Solange | A Seat at the Table | Additional synth editing | — | |
| "Don't You Wait" | 2016 | Solange | A Seat at the Table | Production and guitar | — | Solange Knowles, Sampha, David Longstreth, Olugbenga, Troy Johnson, and Kwes |
| "Interlude: This Moment" | 2016 | Solange | A Seat at the Table | Production | — | Solange Knowles |
| "Don't Wish Me Well" | 2016 | Solange | A Seat at the Table | Production | — | Solange Knowles, Sampha, David Longstreth, and Kwes |
| "Scales" (featuring Kelela) | 2016 | Solange | A Seat at the Table | Additional vocals | — | |
| "OUR MUSIC. #MYCALVINS" (featuring Kelela) | 2017 | Solange | — | Production | — | Blood Orange and Caroline Polachek |
| "Saint" | 2018 | Blood Orange | Negro Swan | Vocals | — | |
| "Send to Robin Immediately" | 2018 | Robyn | Honey | Co-writing and production | Robyn and Marvin Burns | - |
| "Step Into My Life" | 2020 | Jessie Ware | What's Your Pleasure? | Co-writing and production | Jessica Ware and James Ford | James Ford |
| "Grapefruit On The Porch" | 2020 | Denai Moore | "Modern Dread" | Production | — | Steph Marziano |
| "0208" | 2021 | Jessie Ware | What's Your Pleasure? | Co-writing and production | Jessica Ware | - |
| "All My Love" | 2022 | Louie Vega | "Expansions In The NYC" | Co-writing, vocals, keys, additional production | Louie Vega and Robyn | - |

=== Videos ===
| Song | Directed by | Date |
|---|---|---|
| Gee Up | Jack Latham | 2009 |
| Cyan | Ben Fries | 2011 |
| Gee Up | Adam Bainbridge | 2012 |
| House | Daniel Brereton & Adam Bainbridge | 2012 |
| That's Alright | Adam Bainbridge | 2012 |
| This Is Not About Us | Adam Bainbridge and Daniel Brereton | 2014 |
| Who Do You Love | Daniel Brereton | 2014 |
| I'll Be Back | Daniel Brereton | 2015 |

== Radio work ==
In 2016–17, Bainbridge hosted a monthly show for Red Bull Music Academy.

| Guest | Transmission date |
|---|---|
| MikeQ | 28 April 2016 |
| Devonte Hynes | 8 June 2016 |
| Jesse Rae | 23 June 2016 |
| Eric Johnson | 25 August 2016 |
| SCRAAATCH | 22 September 2016 |
| Sampha | 27 October 2016 |
| Honey Dijon | 24 November 2016 |
| DJ Rekha, Nitasha Tamar Sharma, Anupa Mistry, Falu Bakrania | 22 December 2016 |
| Alexandria | 23 February 2017 |
| Jimmy Douglass | 23 March 2017 |
| Tom Lee, Nicole Will, Jonathan Hiam | 3 May 2017 |
| Byron Stingily | 7 June 2017 |
| Tawiah | 5 July 2017 |
| Asma Maroof | 2 August 2017 |
| Nabihah Iqbal, Imran Peretta | 6 September 2017 |
| Fatima Al Qadiri | 4 October 2017 |
| Helen Park, Jason Kim | 1 November 2017 |
