= Mikaelin Bluespruce =

American record producer

Mikaelin 'Blue' Bluespruce is an American, New York City based mix engineer and record producer. He has worked with notable artists of many different genres including: Solange Knowles, Nas, Lin-Manuel Miranda, Skepta, Dev Hynes, Marsha Ambrosius, Aloe Blacc, Common, & Prince Royce.

Blue was one of the primary recording engineers, and the mixing engineer for Solange's critically acclaimed A Seat At The Table album, which debuted at number one on the Billboard Top 200 Albums chart. Blue was awarded a Grammy certificate for his work on the Cranes In The Sky, which won a Grammy for "Best R&B Performance" at the 2017 Grammy Awards.

For The Hamilton Mixtape, Blue mixed songs for Hip Hop artists Nas, Dave East, Common & Black Thought, as well as famed soul singer Alloe Blacc, and Lin-Manuel Miranda, the creator and star of Broadway's Hamilton. The mixtape also debuted at number one on the Billboard Top 200.

== Biography ==
Blue moved to New York from Seattle at the age of 18, as a DJ with aspirations of becoming a studio engineer. In 2006 he graduated with Honors from New York University's program for Music Technology, and worked as an intern at Jay-Z & Just Blaze's Baseline Studios. After doing years of freelance work in studios such as Quad and Sony, he took the position of Head Engineer at Lounge Studios, in midtown Manhattan.

== Selected discography ==
Taken from Allmusic

Mariah Carey - Caution

Blood Orange - Negro Swan

tUnE-yArDs - I Can Feel You Creep Into My Private Life

Lin-Manuel Miranda - Almost Like Praying

Sir The Baptist - Saint or Sinner

Various Artists - The Hamilton Mixtape

Solange - A Seat At The Table

Blood Orange - Freetown Sound

Skepta - Konnichiwa

Carly Rae Jepsen - EMOTION

Blood Orange - Cupid Deluxe

Solange Knowles - Saint Heron Compilation

Solange Knowles – True

Marsha Ambrosius – Late Nights & Early Mornings

Prince Royce – Prince Royce

Cheryl Cole – 3 Words

Thao & The Get Down Stay Down – Temple
