= Coastal Grooves =

Studio album by Blood Orange
- Released: 30 August 2011
- Genres: New wave; funk
- Label: Domino
- Producer: Ariel Rechtshaid

Blood Orange chronology
Coastal Grooves (2011)	Cupid Deluxe (2013)

Coastal Grooves is the debut studio album by Blood Orange. It was released on 30 August 2011 under Domino Recording Company. The album features no guest appearances and was produced by Ariel Rechtshaid in Los Angeles. Domino Recording Company described the album as highlighting the glamour and drama of New York City in the 1980s.

== Music ==
The album incorporates stylistic elements of indie rock, baroque pop, folk, contemporary R&B, jazz, soul, and electronic music. By fusing many of these elements together, Blood Orange captures sounds of grooviness, reverbed guitar lines, and piano synths to create music that is described as being a part of a post-punk atmosphere. In the music video for "I'm Sorry We Lied", produced by Domino Recording Company and directed by Abteen Bagheri in 2012, the story follows Blood Orange and a woman's night life adventure in New York City. Aside from "I'm Sorry We Lied", many works on the album are also said to be inspired by the after-hours environment of NYC. In 2010, Blood Orange underwent throat surgery and as a result, the album is sung mainly in falsetto.

== Album cover ==
The cover art features a portrait of Bianca “Exotica” Maldonado by photographer Brian Lantelme. The photograph was taken in 1997 in front of Sally’s Hideaway, a Times Square nightclub. In a November 2013 article Complex magazine listed the album's cover as one of the "50 Best Pop Album Covers of the Past Five Years", also stating that Hynes was "inspired by transgender icons, like Octavia St. Laurent while he was wrapping production on the LP".

== Critical reception ==
Professional ratings
Aggregate scores
Source	Rating
AnyDecentMusic?	7.0/10
Metacritic	72/100
Review scores
Source	Rating
AllMusic	4/5 stars
Drowned in Sound	9/10
The Guardian	3/5 stars
Loud and Quiet	7/10
NME	3.5/5 stars
Pitchfork	5.9/10
The Skinny	3/5 stars
Tiny Mix Tapes	3.5/5 stars
Uncut	4/5 stars
Under the Radar	5/10

The album has a rating of 72/100 on Metacritic based on 18 reviews, indicating generally favourable reviews. A reviewer for Pitchfork wrote that Coastal Grooves omits catchy choruses and melodies in favour of stark guitar lines and seductive mumbling but ultimately gave the album a rating of a 5.9/10.

== Commercial performance ==
The track "Champagne Coast" went viral on social media platform TikTok during July of 2024. The song also entered the Hot Alternative Songs chart at number 15, with almost 6 million streams.

== Track listing ==
All tracks are written by Devonté Hynes.

Coastal Grooves track listing
No.	Title	Length
1.	"Forget It"	3:56
2.	"Sutphin Boulevard"	3:33
3.	"I'm Sorry We Lied"	4:00
4.	"Can We Go Inside Now?"	3:51
5.	"S'cooled"	3:10
6.	"Complete Failure"	3:35
7.	"Instantly Blank (The Goodness)"	2:53
8.	"The Complete Knock"	5:03
9.	"Are You Sure You're Really Busy?"	4:21
10.	"Champagne Coast"	4:52
11.	"Said No" (iTunes bonus track)	4:54

== Personnel ==
- Devonté Hynes – vocals, music, lyrics, production, guitar, keyboards, bass, percussion, drums
- Ariel Rechtshaid – production, percussion, mixing, engineering
- Nedelle Torrisi – additional vocals (2, 7)
- Justin Meldal-Johnsen – bass
- Chris Rakestraw – additional engineering
- Garrett Ray – drums
- Howie Weinberg – mastering
- David Schiffman – mixing
- Brian Lantelme – photography
