= Freetown Sound =

Studio album by Blood Orange
- Released: 28 June 2016
- Recorded: 2014–16
- Genres: Avant-pop; funk; R&B
- Length: 58:40
- Label: Domino
- Producers: Devonté Hynes; Adam Bainbridge; Patrick Wimberly

Blood Orange chronology
Cupid Deluxe (2013)	Freetown Sound (2016)	Negro Swan (2018)

Singles from Freetown Sound
- 1. "Sandra's Smile" Released: 2015; 2. "Hadron Collider" Released: 11 January 2016; 3. "Augustine" Released: 2016; 4. "I Know" Released: 2016; 5. "Better Than Me" Released: 2016

Freetown Sound is the third studio album by Dev Hynes recording as Blood Orange. It was released on 28 June 2016, three days before its originally announced release date of 1 July 2016. The album contains guest appearances by Empress Of, Debbie Harry, Nelly Furtado, Kelsey Lu and Carly Rae Jepsen. The album cover is a 2009 photograph titled Binky and Tony Forever by American artist Deana Lawson.

== Production ==
Freetown Sound takes its name from Freetown, Sierra Leone, where Hynes' father was born. The album features Carly Rae Jepsen, Zuri Marley, Debbie Harry, Nelly Furtado, writer Ta-Nehisi Coates, slam poet Ashlee Haze, and others. When he first announced the album's release on Instagram, Hynes wrote that the album was intended for those who had been told they were "not black enough, too black, too queer, not queer the right way."

== Promotion ==
The track "Hadron Collider", featuring Nelly Furtado, was released only as a cassette tape on 12 December 2015, and sold exclusively at his shows at the Apollo Theater in New York City. A music video for "Augustine" was released on 28 June 2016, accompanying the release of the album. A video for "I Know" was released on 28 October 2016, followed by a video for "Better Than Me", featuring Carly Rae Jepsen, on 16 December 2016. On 24 March 2017, a music video/short film for the tracks "With Him", "Best to You", and "Better Numb" was released exclusively on the music streaming service TIDAL. The video also features Empress Of, appearing on behalf of her vocals on "Best to You".

== Composition ==
Freetown Sound has been seen as a "deep" avant-pop work, as well as pulling in funk and 80s R&B sounds. It also works gospel, quiet storm's "subtle bluster", soca and soul into its mix.

== Critical reception ==
Professional ratings
Aggregate scores
Source	Rating
AnyDecentMusic?	7.7/10
Metacritic	82/100
Review scores
Source	Rating
AllMusic	3.5/5 stars
The A.V. Club	A
The Guardian	3/5 stars
The Independent	3/5 stars
NME	4/5
Pitchfork	8.8/10
Q	4/5 stars
Rolling Stone	4/5 stars
Spin	8/10
Vice (Expert Witness)	A−

The album was released to high critical acclaim and positive reviews. Writing for Exclaim!, Stephen Carlick praised the album, calling it "Hynes at his best, mixing his best songwriting and production yet to powerful, purposeful effect."

The album was shortlisted by IMPALA (The Independent Music Companies Association) for the Album of the Year Award 2016, which rewards on a yearly basis the best album released on an independent European label.

=== Accolades ===
Publication	Accolade	Year	Rank	Ref.
Consequence of Sound	Top 50 Albums of 2016	2016	14	
The Guardian	The Best Albums of 2016	2016	23	
Paste	The 50 Best Albums of 2016	2016	18	
The Quietus	Albums of the Year 2016	2016	31	
The Skinny	Top 50 Albums of 2016	2016	16	
Noisey	The Best 100 Albums of 2016	2016	16	
Pitchfork	The 50 Best Albums of 2016	2016	14	

== Track listing ==
No.	Title	Writer(s)	Length
1.	"By Ourselves"	Devonté Hynes; Adam Bainbridge; Charles Mingus; Ashlee Haze	2:12
2.	"Augustine"	Hynes	3:51
3.	"Chance"	Hynes	2:49
4.	"Best to You"	Hynes; Lorely Rodriguez; Christopher Amoo; Edward Amoo	3:46
5.	"With Him"	Hynes; Beatriz De Rijke	1:25
6.	"E.V.P."	Hynes; Beatriz De Rijke; Waliou Jacques Badarou	5:44
7.	"Love Ya"	Eddy Grant	2:48
8.	"But You"	Hynes	3:01
9.	"Desirée"	Hynes; Patrick Wimberly	3:01
10.	"Hands Up"	Hynes	4:09
11.	"Hadron Collider"	Hynes; Nelly Furtado	3:44
12.	"Squash Squash"	Hynes; Beatriz De Rijke	3:37
13.	"Juicy 1–4"	Hynes	4:36
14.	"Better Than Me"	Hynes	3:17
15.	"Thank You"	Hynes; Bainbridge; Rodney Franklin	3:04
16.	"I Know"	Hynes	4:35
17.	"Better Numb"	Hynes	3:01

Japanese edition
No.	Title	Length
18.	"St. Marcus"	2:22

Sample credits

- "By Ourselves" contains samples from "Myself When I Am Real" written by Charles Mingus and the poem "For Colored Women" by Ashlee Haze.
- "With Him" contains samples from the 1995 documentary film Black Is... Black Ain't.
- "E.V.P" contains samples from "Chief Inspector" written by Wally Badarou from his "Echoes" album.
- "Love Ya" contains samples from an interview with Ta-Nehisi Coates.
- "Desirée" contains samples from the 1990 documentary film Paris Is Burning.
- "Hands Up" contains samples from an interview with Vince Staples.
- "Thank You" contains samples from "Stakes Is High" by De La Soul.

== Personnel ==
- Devonté Hynes – vocals (tracks 1–14, 16, 17), keyboards (tracks 1, 4–10), piano (tracks 7, 8, 11–16), bass (tracks 2–4, 6, 8–16), drums (tracks 2, 4, 6–8, 10–16), synths (tracks 2, 3, 11–14, 16), drum machine (tracks 2, 4, 11–14, 16), guitar (tracks 2, 6, 8, 10, 14, 16), cello (tracks 1, 4, 6, 11, 12), drum programming (tracks 3, 6, 8), scratching (3, 6, 12), percussion (track 9), vox (track 15), EWI (track 15), Juno (track 17); arrangement (track 7), vocal arrangements (track 11); production, engineering (tracks 1–8, 10–17), mixing (track 9); booklet photos
- Jason Arce – saxophone (tracks 1, 3, 5–7, 15); saxophone arrangements (tracks 1, 7)
- Adam Bainbridge – drums, sampling (track 15) production (track 15); end arrangement (track 1)
- BEA1991 – vocals (tracks 5, 6, 12)
- Mikaelin 'Blue' Bluespruce – additional vocal engineering (tracks 1–4, 8, 10, 14), mixing (tracks 1–8, 10–17)
- Dave Cooley – additional live engineering (tracks 6, 13)
- Matthew Cooper – design
- Bryndon Cook – vocals (tracks 8, 10, 14)
- Christopher Egan – drums (tracks 6, 13)
- David Ginyard – bass (tracks 6, 13)
- Debbie Harry – vocals (track 6)
- Nick Harwood – booklet photo
- Nelly Furtado – vocals (track 11); vocal arrangements (track 11)
- Ian Isiah – vocals (tracks 1, 2)
- Joseph of Mercury – vocal arrangements (track 11)
- John Carroll Kirby – keyboards (tracks 6, 13)
- Caleb Laven – additional engineering (tracks 4, 6, 16)
- Kelsey Lu – vocals (track 3); organisation of tracks idea (track 17)
- Aaron Maine – third chord suggestion in hook (track 2); acoustic guitar (track 17)
- Benjamin Morsberger – guitar (track 6)
- Zuri Marley – vocals (track 7)
- Carly Rae Jepsen – vocals (track 14)
- Ava Raiin – vocals (tracks 1, 2, 13, 15)
- Miles Benjamin Anthony Robinson – engineering (track 9)
- Lorely Rodriguez – vocals (track 4)
- Paul J Street – design
- Patrick Wimberly – drums, percussion, bass (track 9); production (track 9)

== Charts ==
Chart (2016)	Peak position
Australia (ARIA Hitseekers)	4
Belgian Albums (Ultratop Flanders)	78
Belgian Albums (Ultratop Wallonia)	125
German Albums (Offizielle Top 100)	81
New Zealand Heatseekers Albums (RMNZ)	10
Norwegian Albums (VG-lista)	23
Swiss Albums (Schweizer Hitparade)	88
UK Albums (Official Charts)	154
US Billboard 200	159
US Top R&B/Hip-Hop Albums (Billboard)	10
