= Negro Swan =

Studio album by Blood Orange
- Released: 24 August 2018
- Genre: Alternative pop; bedroom pop; funk; psychedelic pop; soul; alternative R&B
- Length: 49:27
- Label: Domino
- Producer: Devonté Hynes

Blood Orange chronology
Freetown Sound (2016)	Negro Swan (2018)	Angel's Pulse (2019)

Singles from Negro Swan
- 1. "Charcoal Baby" Released: 26 July 2018; 2. "Jewelry" Released: 26 July 2018; 3. "Hope" Released: 24 August 2018

Negro Swan is the fourth studio album by Blood Orange, an alias of British musician Dev Hynes. It was released on 24 August 2018 by Domino. The album was preceded by the singles "Charcoal Baby" and "Jewelry".

== Release and promotion ==
On 19 July 2018, Hynes shared a teaser video of the album featuring a snippet of new music, before announcing the album and making it available for pre-order later the same day. The cover art features an image of Kai the Black Angel sitting on a car's front window with a white do-rag on his head and wings clipped to his back. The album was released on 24 August 2018 through Domino.

In a press release, Hynes described the album as "an exploration into my own and many types of black depression, an honest look at the corners of black existence, and the ongoing anxieties of queer/people of color. A reach back into childhood and modern traumas, and the things we do to get through it all. The underlying thread through each piece on the album is the idea of hope, and the lights we can try to turn on within ourselves with a hopefully positive outcome of helping others out of their darkness." The album focuses on these themes heavily in today's current ideals of gender and sexuality. Honesty is a very powerful tool in the production of the album because it is what bridges the gap between understanding viewpoints of oppressed groups. With songs like "Hope" and "Runnin" masculine influences are brought into analysis in order to create an understanding of how societal forces impact the ideals of sexuality. Each song on the album presses this issue with a mix of soul, R&B, and other genre's styles in order to convey a story of facing depression.The press release also stated that the album was entirely written and produced by Hynes.

On 23 July, Hynes performed multiple tracks from the album at the Pitchfork Music Festival, including "Nappy Wonder" and "Charcoal Baby", the latter was released as the first single from the album on 26 July with a music video directed by Crack Stevens. Shortly afterwards, another single titled "Jewelry" was released, accompanied by a music video directed by Hynes, featuring an appearance from Janet Mock.

In promotion of the album, Hynes embarked on a North American and European tour which began on 5 August at the Osheaga Festival and ended on 8 November in Copenhagen.

== Composition ==
Negro Swan's 16 songs weave "impressionist" psychedelic pop and "interstellar" funk together, as well as working in "cosy" bedroom pop. Due to Blood Orange's eclectic musical sounds, the album also digs into alternative pop, chillwave, dream pop, hip hop soul, post-punk, quiet storm, R&B, indie hip-hop, jazz, and more.

== Critical reception ==
Professional ratings
Aggregate scores
Source	Rating
AnyDecentMusic?	8.0/10
Metacritic	84/100
Review scores
Source	Rating
AllMusic	5/5 stars
The A.V. Club	A
The Guardian	3/5 stars
The Independent	4/5 stars
NME	5/5 stars
The Observer	5/5 stars
Pitchfork	7.6/10
Q	4/5 stars
Rolling Stone	4/5 stars
Uncut	8/10

At Metacritic, which assigns a normalized rating out of 100 to reviews from mainstream publications, Negro Swan received an average score of 84, based on 26 reviews, indicating "universal acclaim". David Sackllah of Consequence of Sound stated that "Negro Swan is a grand work that gives credit to the pioneers of the culture while building a path forward within that framework, placing Hynes firmly in the canon as one of the most insightful musicians of his generation." Slant Magazine's Zachary Hoskins wrote, "It's this ability to capture both sides with equal commitment—the struggle and the resistance through self-love—that makes Negro Swan Hynes's most assured, accomplished, and significant album to date." The Independent critic Jazz Monroe said "While Negro Swan elaborates on Hynes's best work, he remains grounded in cosy bedroom-pop by shambling drum machines, vocal compressors and gratuitous psych pedals."

In the review for AllMusic, writer Andy Kellman stated that the album, "qualifies as Hynes' most inward work, but it's a product of considerable interaction, whether the singer, songwriter, and multi-instrumentalist is handing off ideas to Diddy on the Connected-era Foreign Exchange-like "Hope", trading primary instruments with the Internet's Steve Lacy on the swirling "Out of Your League", or leaving enough room on each track for up to four additional voices, including Kelsey Lu, Amandla Stenberg, and Adam Bainbridge."

== Accolades ==
Publication	List	Rank	Ref.
AllMusic	AllMusic Best of 2018: Year in Review	*	
NME	NME's Albums Of The Year 2018	12	
Pitchfork	The 50 Best Albums of 2018	46	
PopMatters	The 70 Best Albums of 2018	31	

== Track listing ==
All tracks produced by Devonté Hynes.

No.	Title	Writer(s)	Length
1.	"Orlando"	Devonté Hynes	3:03
2.	"Saint"	Hynes	3:12
3.	"Take Your Time"	Hynes	2:51
4.	"Hope" (featuring Puff Daddy and Tei Shi)	Valerie Teicher; Sean Combs; Mikey Hart; Hynes	4:00
5.	"Jewelry"	Hynes	4:32
6.	"Family" (featuring Janet Mock)	Hynes	0:42
7.	"Charcoal Baby"	Aaron Maine; Hynes	4:02
8.	"Vulture Baby"	Hynes	1:14
9.	"Chewing Gum" (featuring ASAP Rocky and Project Pat)	Rakim Mayers; Patrick Houston; Hynes	4:24
10.	"Holy Will" (featuring Ian Isiah)	Hynes; Elbernita Clark Terrell	4:22
11.	"Dagenham Dream"	Hynes	2:45
12.	"Nappy Wonder"	Hynes	2:38
13.	"Runnin'" (featuring Georgia Anne Muldrow)	Muldrow; Amandla Stenberg; Fai Khadra; Hynes	3:55
14.	"Out of Your League" (featuring Steve Lacy)	Lacy; Hynes	2:21
15.	"Minetta Creek"	Hynes	1:58
16.	"Smoke"	Andrew Aged; Hynes	3:33
Total length:			49:27

== Personnel ==
Credits adapted from Negro Swan album liner notes.

- Devonté Hynes – vocals, production, guitar, bass, keyboards, saxophone, drums, drum programming, electronic wind instrument, piano, sampling, mixing, art direction
- Janet Mock – narration (tracks 1, 5, 6, 11, 13)
- Ian Isiah – vocals (tracks 1, 3, 5, 7, 10)
- Amandla Stenberg – vocals (tracks 1, 13)
- BEA1991 – vocals (track 2)
- Ava Raiin – vocals (track 2)
- Adam Bainbridge – vocals (track 2)
- Aaron Maine – vocals (tracks 2, 7)
- Tei Shi – vocals (track 4)
- Puff Daddy – vocals (track 4)
- Eva Tolkin – vocals (tracks 5, 7, 10)
- Zuri Marley – vocals (track 7)
- Fai Khadra – vocals (tracks 9, 12, 13, 16)
- ASAP Rocky – vocals (track 9)
- Project Pat – vocals (track 9)
- Diana Gordon – vocals (track 9)
- Caroline Polachek - vocals (track 10)
- Kelsey Lu – vocals (tracks 12, 16)
- Georgia Anne Muldrow – vocals (track 13)
- Steve Lacy – vocals (track 14), keyboards (track 14), drums (track 14)
- Marti – vocals (track 16)
- Andrew Aged – vocals (track 16), guitar (tracks 12, 16)
- Austin Williamson (of Onyx Collective) – drums (tracks 1, 8, 15)
- Jason Arce – flute (tracks 3, 7), saxophone (tracks 2, 5–7)
- Mikey Freedom Hart – piano (track 4), guitar (track 10), keyboards (track 10)
- Ben Marino – drums (track 7)
- Malcolm – synthesizer (track 10)
- Rob Ackwood – guitar (track 15)
- Matthew Testa – recording (track 4)
- Zach Brown – mix engineering assistance (tracks 1, 8, 10)
- Mikaelin Bluespruce – mixing (tracks 1, 2, 4–7, 9–12, 16)
- Joe Visciano – mixing (track 8), additional mixing (tracks 13–15)
- Ana Kras – cover art
- Matthew Cooper – design

== Charts ==
Chart (2018)	Peak position
Australian Albums (ARIA)	99
Belgian Albums (Ultratop Flanders)	40
Belgian Albums (Ultratop Wallonia)	161
Canadian Albums (Billboard)	94
Dutch Albums (Album Top 100)	76
UK Albums (OCC)	64
US Billboard 200	98
US Independent Albums (Billboard)	13
US Top R&B/Hip-Hop Albums (Billboard)	49

== Release history ==
Region	Date	Label	Format	Ref.
Various	24 August 2018	Domino	CD, digital download	
Various	5 October 2018	Domino	Double LP	
