= Passing (soundtrack) =

Passing (Music from and Inspired by the Original Motion Picture)

Film score by Devonté Hynes
- Released: November 10, 2021
- Recorded: 2020–2021
- Genre: Film score
- Length: 21:27
- Label: Lakeshore
- Producer: Devonté Hynes

Devonté Hynes chronology
Mainstream (2021)	Passing (2021)	Rap Shit (2022)

Singles from Passing (Music from and Inspired by the Original Motion Picture)
- 1. "Passing" Released: November 9, 2021

Passing (Music from and Inspired by the Original Motion Picture) is the film score composed by Devonté Hynes to the 2021 film Passing directed by Rebecca Hall, starring Tessa Thompson and Ruth Negga. The album was released under the Lakeshore Records label on November 10, 2021.

== Background ==
In September 2020, it was reported that Devonté Hynes would compose the film score for Passing and had already began writing music by then. Hall wanted to make a counterintuitive choice with the music, as many of them have a notion regarding the 1920s as "this sort of loud, noisy, Jazz Age" which was not the reality. The music was one of the tools that Hall used to get in Irene's head without explicitly saying what she's feeling. The sound had to be quiet to express her narrow views, whatever happening in her day-to-day basis, until she first sees Claire, where "before she even really sees her face, she sees her crossing her legs, and the sound of her stockings". Hall noticed this to find the sensual sounds of stockings rubbing at each other, though normally being loud from a distance, Irene immediately felt in a way that she does not hear something right next to her. These tiny details were noticed by Hall, in order to let the viewers inside Irene's head.

Hall wanted the music to be really quiet and did three sound mixes, as she wanted absolute periods of uncomfortable silence to avoid crowding and maintain time to let the complexity live. Besides that, she heard a piano piece from pianist Emahoy Tsegué-Maryam Guèbrou, called "The Homeless Wanderer", which was used throughout the film as the only piece of score. However, while discussing with Hynes, he noted on composing themes for characters, one being Claire's theme which was stuck inside Irene's head which was monotonous. Hall asked Hynes to write Irene's theme, "which is real in the sense that it's practical". Much of the themes were interwoven into "The Homeless Wanderer" and the cue in itself was sweetened and changed at certain instances to make it different and frightening, while providing a deliberate sound.

The main title theme was released as a single on November 9, 2021, while the soundtrack was released by Lakeshore Records, the following day in conjunction with the Netflix release.

== Track listing ==
No.	Title	Length
1.	"Passing"	3:13
2.	"Irene and Clare"	3:24
3.	"The Drayton"	2:52
4.	"Springtime"	0:29
5.	"Clare's Letter"	1:57
6.	"Home Visit"	2:17
7.	"Laying in the Sun"	0:25
8.	"Autumn"	3:05
9.	"The Children"	0:43
10.	"Irene's Headache"	2:42
11.	"Goodbye"	0:20
Total length:		21:27

== Reception ==
Jessica Kiang of Variety called it a "spare, gentle, jazz-piano trills". David Rooney of The Hollywood Reporter wrote "The underscoring of composer Devonté Hynes' gentle jazz piano strains contributes further to the vivid conjuring of a lost world." Moira Macdonald of The Seattle Times noted that the film is "accompanied by delicate piano music by Devonte Hynes that sounds beautifully faded". Okayplayer wrote "The score, composed by Devonte Hynes, enhances the beauty and emotional unrest of the characters in every scene." Shirley Li of The Atlantic wrote "Devonté Hynes's twinkly piano score underlines the delicate nature of [the characters'] intertwined lives." Jocelyn Noveck of AP News wrote "jazz music by Devonté Hynes provides a wonderfully evocative soundtrack to what is, for Clare, a headlong descent into danger, ending with one of the more disturbing (and yet starkly beautiful) endings you'll see this year." Mick LaSalle of Datebook noted that the score consisted "of stray piano riffs, both mysterious and plaintive."

== Accolades ==
Award	Date of ceremony	Category	Recipient(s)	Result	Ref.
Black Reel Awards	February 27, 2022	Outstanding Original Score	Devonté Hynes	Nominated	
Guild of Music Supervisors Awards	March 12, 2022	Best Music Supervision for Films Budgeted Under $10 Million	Alexandra Eckhardt	Nominated	
