= Tawiah =

British singer

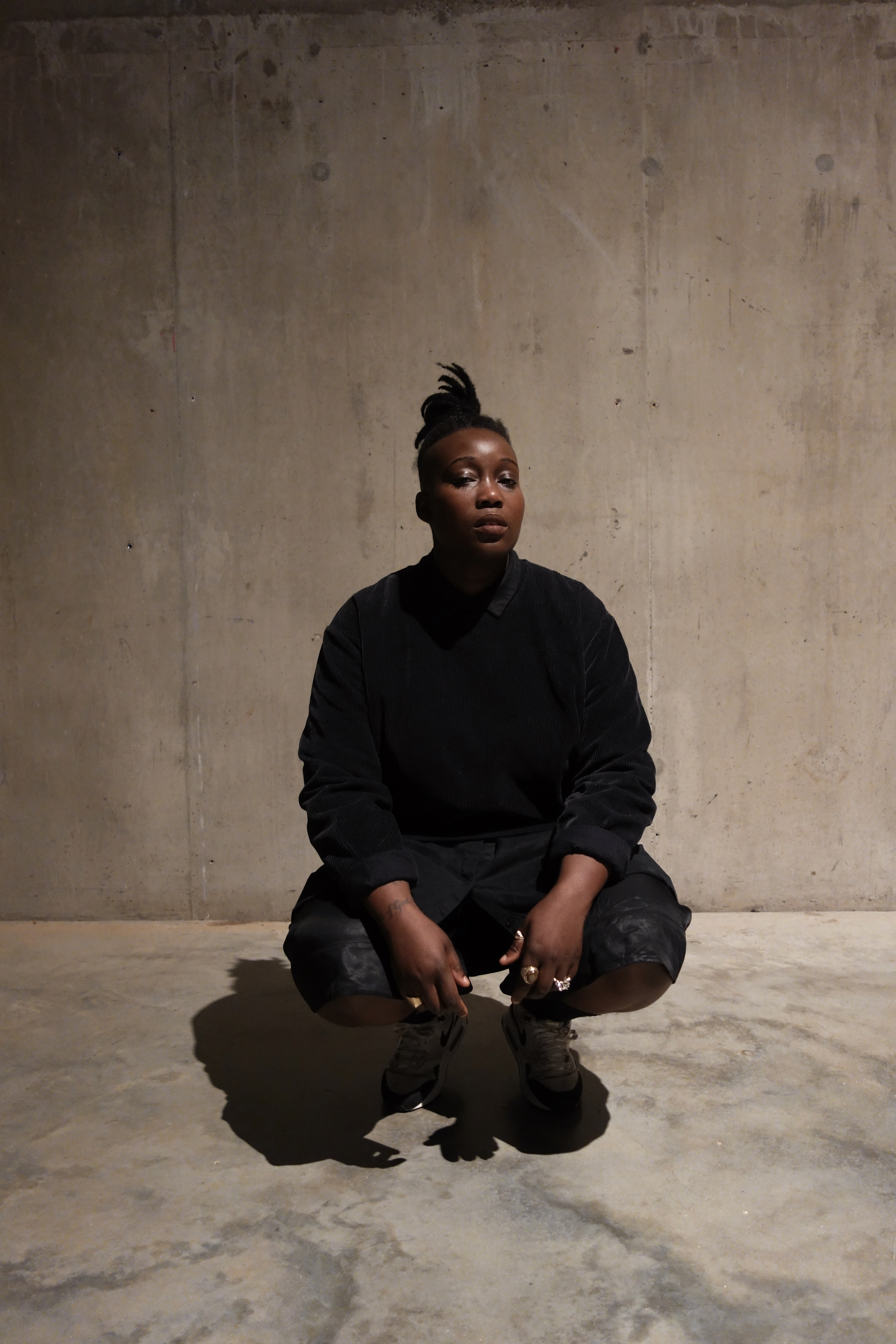
- Tawiah in 2018

Background information
- Origin: London, England
- Genres: Alt-soul, neo-soul, jazz
- Occupation(s): Singer, songwriter
- Instrument(s): Vocals, piano, guitar
- Years active: 2006–present
- Labels: Lima Limo, Warner Bros., Bush Girl, First Word
- Website: tawiahmusic.com

Tawiah (pronounced Taa-We-Ah) is a British alternative-soul singer and songwriter based in London.

== Early life ==
Tawiah was born to Ghanaian parents in Battersea, South West London, where she grew up with her two brothers on the 18th floor of a council estate. She describes her childhood as filled with church, laughter and playing out on the block. Tawiah was raised in a Pentecostal household honing her early singing capabilities as a young praise and worship leader in the Gospel Choir. Inspired by jazz, soul, R&B and Gospel she also learned to play the piano, guitar and clarinet. She attended Burntwood Academy for girls singing in their classical choir, she was nominated by her music teacher for a place at the BRIT School, which she was successful in gaining.

== Musical career ==
Tawiah self-released her EP In Jodi's Bedroom (Bush Girl Records) and Recreate on Lima Limo Records. In 2019, she released her debut album Starts Again on First Word Records. In 2018, she toured Recreate with Moses Sumney and in 2020 Starts Again with Michael Kiwanuka.

Tawiah has also worked in collaboration with artists including Blood Orange, Kindness, Mark Ronson, Cee-Lo, Kano, Wiley, Ghostpoet, Zed Bias and Eric Lau. She co-wrote and performed the Cinematic Orchestra's single "Wait for Now".

Her work has received acclaim and coverage from OkayPlayer, The Fader, Afropunk, The Guardian, iD Magazine, Complex, Stylist, Refinery, London in Stereo, Bandcamp and Time Out, to name a few, and personal accolades have come far and wide over the years, from Quincy Jones to Adele, Jeff Goldblum and Queen Latifah.

== Discography ==
=== Albums ===
- Starts Again (2019)

=== EPs ===
- In Jodi's Bedroom (2007)
- Freedom Drop (2013)
- Recreate (2017)
