= Cranes in the Sky =

Single by Solange

from the album A Seat at the Table
- Released: October 5, 2016
- Recorded: 2008–2016
- Genre: R&B; soul; psychedelic soul
- Length: 4:10
- Label: Saint; Columbia
- Songwriter: Solange Knowles
- Producers: Solange Knowles; Raphael Saadiq

Solange singles chronology
"Electric Lady" (2014)	"Cranes in the Sky" (2016)	"Don't Touch My Hair" (2016)

Music video
- "Cranes in the Sky" on YouTube

"Cranes in the Sky" is a song by American singer-songwriter Solange. Released on October 5, 2016 by Saint Records and Columbia Records, it is the first single from Solange's third album, A Seat at the Table. The song was written by Solange, who co-produced it with Raphael Saadiq.

"Cranes in the Sky" is a mid-tempo soul ballad, that lyrically explores the singer's unsuccessful attempts to distract herself from a longstanding pain. The single's accompanying music video was directed by Solange and Alan Ferguson. Following its release, "Cranes in the Sky" debuted at number 74 on the Billboard Hot 100. It won the Grammy for Best R&B Performance at the 59th Annual Grammy Awards. In 2021, "Cranes in the Sky" was ranked at number 487 on the updated list of Rolling Stone's 500 Greatest Songs of All Time.

== Background and composition ==
Solange wrote "Cranes in the Sky" eight years before the album's release, in the aftermath of her break-up with the father of her child–whom she had been with for seven years, since age 13. In 2008, producer and singer Raphael Saadiq handed Solange a CD with a few instrumentals on it. One consisted simply of drums, strings, and bass. Two months later, Solange wrote "Cranes in the Sky" while listening to the instrumentals in a Miami hotel. In 2016, when she had finished writing and creating A Seat at the Table in New Iberia, Louisiana, Solange revisited "Cranes in the Sky"—shortly after which she called Raphael and asked if he would help produce a few other songs on the album. Lyrically, the song explores the idea of attempting to avoid the elephant in the room. It describes a person looking to distract themselves in various ways from an unaddressed sadness. In speaking of the title, Solange explains a situation where sudden economic growth turned a once quiet, tranquil town into a busy, construction-infested city, where mechanical cranes block the view of the scenery. She says, "Like so much of America, [in that town] there was just so much real estate development. And, literally everywhere that I looked, I saw a crane in the sky. You could not look down any street without seeing dozens and dozens of them, and it felt very heavy. They were an eyesore [...] and so disruptive to a place that I found peace in." She continued, saying that "all this excessive building" was not "really dealing with what was in front of us".

== Critical reception ==
"Cranes in the Sky" received widespread acclaim from critics and was ranked at number 7 on Rolling Stone's "50 Best Songs of 2016" list: "Solange drops a song that can always stop you dead in your tracks, no matter where or when you hear it – describing the kind of sadness she can't escape by crying, drinking, sexing or shopping it away. The music builds from quiet meditation – that Raphael Saadiq bass – into towering soul." Billboard ranked "Cranes in the Sky" at number 12 on their "100 Best Pop Songs of 2016" list: "Post-adolescent angst has rarely been as pretty as Solange makes it sound in this delicate, lilting single — which you're as likely to hear on Hot 97 as at your local coffee shop. An orchestral beat from Raphael Saadiq supports the song's lyrical quest for serenity, creating a sort of musical safe space for the beautiful, uncluttered respite that Solange spends the single desperately searching for." Pitchfork listed "Cranes in the Sky" as the 3rd best song of 2016. In the annual Village Voice's Pazz & Jop mass critics poll of the year's best in music in 2016, "Cranes in the Sky" was also ranked at number 3. In 2018, NPR ranked the song as the 12th greatest song by a female or nonbinary artist in the 21st century.

== Awards and nominations ==
At the 17th BET Awards, "Cranes in the Sky" was nominated for and won the BET Centric Award. "Cranes in the Sky" also won the Grammy for Best R&B Performance at the 59th Annual Grammy Awards.

== Music video ==
The music video for "Cranes in the Sky" was directed by Solange and Alan Ferguson, with Carlota Guerrero credited for Art and Creative Direction and Arthur Jafa for Director of Photography. It was released on October 2, 2016 alongside the music video for "Don't Touch My Hair."

== Commercial performance ==
In the United Kingdom the song charted at number 29 on the UK R&B Singles chart on October 7, 2016. In the week of October 22, 2016, "Cranes in the Sky" debuted at number 74 on the Billboard Hot 100 and 28 on the Hot R&B/Hip-Hop Songs chart in the United States.

== Credits and personnel ==
Credits adapted from the liner notes of A Seat at the Table.

- Solange – songwriting, production
- Raphael Saadiq – production
- John Carroll Kirby – synthesizer
- Rogét Chahayed – synthesizer

== Charts ==
=== Weekly charts ===
Chart (2016)	Peak position
Belgium (Ultratip Bubbling Under Flanders)	30
UK Hip Hop/R&B (OCC)	29
US Billboard Hot 100	74
US Hot R&B/Hip-Hop Songs (Billboard)	28
US R&B/Hip-Hop Airplay (Billboard)	23

== Certifications ==
Region	Certification	Certified units/sales
United Kingdom (BPI)	Silver	200,000^{‡}
United States (RIAA)	Gold	500,000^{‡}
^{‡} Sales+streaming figures based on certification alone.
