= Kelsey Lu =

American singer and cellist (born 1989)

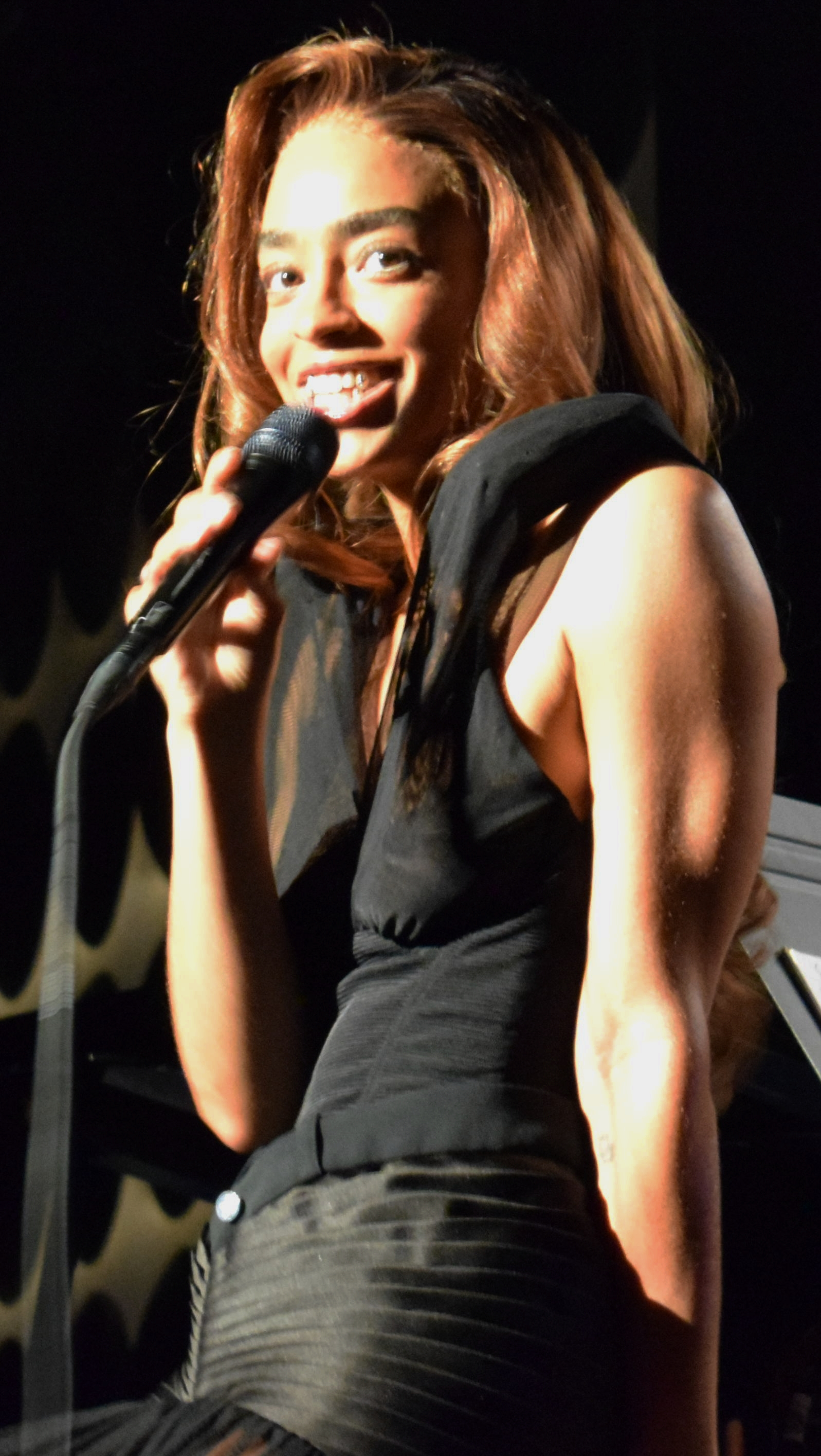
- Lu in 2026

Background information
- Born: Kelsey Elizabeth McJunkins; May 12, 1991 (age 35); Charlotte, North Carolina, U.S.
- Origin: Brooklyn, New York, U.S.
- Genres: Avant pop, baroque pop
- Occupations: Singer; cellist
- Instruments: Vocals; cello
- Years active: 2016–present
- Labels: True Panther Sounds; Columbia Records
- Website: www.kelsey.lu

Kelsey Elizabeth McJunkins (born May 12, 1991), known professionally as Kelsey Lu, is an American singer and cellist based in Los Angeles, California.

== Early life and education ==
Kelsey Lu was born in Charlotte, North Carolina, and had a strict Jehovah's Witness upbringing. Both of Lu's parents are musicians: their father is a percussionist, their mother a pianist. Their father's family hails from Nigeria. Lu began studying classical composition at age 6, learning piano, violin, and cello. At age 18, Lu left their family home to attend the University of North Carolina School of the Arts on a scholarship. A year later, they dropped out of the school.

== Career ==
Kelsey Lu recorded their debut EP, Church, in a church in Greenpoint, Brooklyn. During this time, they toured with the band Wet as their opening act. They released Church in 2016. They released their debut album, Blood, in 2019. In that year, they also released Blood Transfusion, a collection of remixes of tracks from Blood. Lu uses they/them pronouns.

On March 18, 2026, Lu announced their second studio album So Help Me God with the release of the single "Running to Pain". Produced by Jack Antonoff and Yves Rothman, the album is scheduled for release on June 12 via the label Dirty Hit. Featured artists will include Sampha, Kamasi Washington, and Kim Gordon.

== Discography ==
=== Studio albums ===
Title	Details
Blood	Released: April 19, 2019; Label: Columbia Records; Format: LP, Digital download, streaming
So Help Me God	Released: June 12, 2026; Label: Dirty Hit; Format: LP, Digital download, streaming

=== Soundtrack albums ===
Title	Details
Daughters	Released: November 13, 2024; Label: Netflix Music; Format: Digital download, streaming
Earth Mama	Released: December 16, 2024; Label: A24 Music; Format: Digital download, streaming

=== Extended plays ===
Title	Details
Church	Released: July 8, 2016; Label: True Panther; Format: LP, digital download, streaming

=== Remix albums ===
Title	Details
Blood Transfusion	Released: November 15, 2019; Label: Columbia Records; Format: Digital download, streaming

=== Singles ===
Title	Year	Album
"Morning After Coffee"	2016	Church
"Empathy"	2016	Church
"Shades of Blue"	2018	Non-album single
"Due West"	2018	Blood
"I'm Not in Love"	2019	Blood
"Blood"	2019	Blood
"Foreign Car"	2019	Blood
"Morning Dew"	2020	Non-album singles
"Let All the Poisons That Lurk in the Mud Seep Out" (with Yves Tumor featuring Kelly Moran and Moses Boyd)	2020	Non-album singles
"Ride or Die" (with Boys Noize featuring Chilly Gonzales)	2021	Non-album singles
"Love & Validation" (with Boys Noize)	2021	Non-album singles
"French Lessons" (with Mykki Blanco)	2022	Stay Close to Music
"Running To Pain"	2026	So Help Me God
"Portrait Of A Lady On Fire"	2026	So Help Me God
"Better Than That"	2026	So Help Me God
"Comfort"	2026	So Help Me God
"Cutting Off The Head Of A Ghost"	2026	So Help Me God

=== Guest appearances ===
Title	Year	Artist	Album
"Picture This"	2011	The Away Team	Scars & Stripes
"Lost Souls"	2011	L'Orange	Old Soul
"Where or When"	2020	Onyx Collective	Manhattan Special
"Manchild"	2022	Neneh Cherry	The Versions

== Tours ==
- 2019 – "Blood Tour"
- 2026 – "So Help Me God Tour"

== Filmography ==
Short Film

- House Comes with a Bird, Directed by Janicza Bravo (2022)
- So Help Me God The Film, Directed by Savanah Leaf (2026)

Web Show

- Hydroharmonia, format 2 episodies (2020)
