= Dev Hynes =

British musician (born 1985)

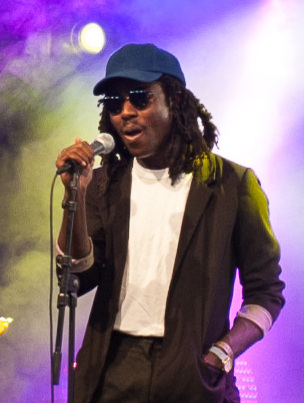
- Hynes performing as Blood Orange at Way Out West in Gothenburg, Sweden, August 2014

Background information
- Also known as: Blood Orange; Lightspeed Champion
- Born: David Joseph Michael Hynes; 23 December 1985 (age 40); London, England
- Genres: Alternative R&B; progressive R&B; experimental jazz; indie rock; art rock
- Instruments: Vocals; guitar; cello; bass; drums; keyboards
- Years active: 2004–present
- Labels: Domino; Terrible; RCA
- Website: bloodorange.net

Devonté Hynes (born David Joseph Michael Hynes, 23 December 1985), also known as Blood Orange and formerly Lightspeed Champion, is a British singer, songwriter, record producer, composer and director based in New York City. From 2004 to 2006, Hynes was a member of the band Test Icicles, playing guitar, synth, and occasionally performing vocals. They released one full-length album in 2005. Hynes went on to release two solo studio albums as Lightspeed Champion, and subsequently five more as Blood Orange, between 2008 and 2025.

He has written, played or produced for and with artists such as Tinashe, Solange Knowles, Connan Mockasin, Tei Shi, Sky Ferreira, FKA Twigs, Britney Spears, Haim, Caroline Polachek, Florence and the Machine, Carly Rae Jepsen, the Chemical Brothers, Kylie Minogue, Lorde, A$AP Rocky, Mac Miller, Blondie, Jazmine Sullivan, Sugababes, Turnstile, Mariah Carey, and Daniel Caesar.

== Early life ==
Dev Hynes was born in Ilford, in the Redbridge Borough of East London, to a Guyanese mother and a Sierra Leone Creole father. He was educated at the Chadwell Heath Foundation School, now known as Chadwell Heath Academy. From their formation in 2004 until their break-up in 2006, Hynes was a member of the dance-punk band Test Icicles, playing guitar, synth, and occasionally performing vocals. They released one full-length album, For Screening Purposes Only, in 2005. Hynes relocated to New York City in 2007 where he resides. Hynes is a supporter of North London football team Tottenham Hotspur.

== Solo work ==
=== Lightspeed Champion ===
In early 2007, Hynes, under the name Lightspeed Champion, recorded his debut album in Omaha, Nebraska, with Saddle Creek producer Mike Mogis. A number of Omaha-based musicians appeared on the record, including Mogis himself, trumpet player and pianist Nate Walcott, the Faint's drummer Clark Baechle and guest vocalist Emmy the Great, along with moonlighting members of Cursive and Tilly and the Wall. These recording sessions resulted in the single "Galaxy of the Lost", released on 30 July 2007, and the album Falling Off the Lavender Bridge, released on 21 January 2008. The name "Lightspeed Champion" comes from a series of comic strips Hynes drew as a teenager in his school mathematics books.

The touring band for the Falling Off the Lavender Bridge album at various points consisted of friends of Hynes' from other bands, including Florence Welch of Florence and the Machine and Emmy the Great. Mike Siddell, formerly of Hope of the States, played violin with the band. Anna Prior, formerly of Leeds bands Dead Disco and the Ivories, played drums for most of the tour. Other guest members to have contributed in live shows include Alex Turner of the Arctic Monkeys, Faris Badwan of the Horrors, Frederick Blood-Royale of Ox.Eagle.Lion.Man, Jack Peñate and Eugene McGuinness as well as We Are Scientists' Keith Murray on Late Night with Conan O'Brien on 6 June 2008.

Backed by a full band, Hynes appeared at the NME 2008 Awards, broadcast on Channel 4 on 29 February 2008, dressed as characters from Star Wars, including Princess Leia on the drums. The band's affinity with Star Wars continued when they played the main theme to the trilogy at the Wireless Festival in 2008. Hynes and a violinist Mike Siddell began a short US tour in March 2008, ending with an appearance at SXSW in 2008. At SXSW, they befriended the Wombats, who supported them at a Royal Albert Hall concert. Hynes also performed with We Are Scientists at the Glastonbury in 2008 (John Peel Stage) and appeared at Belgian music festival Pukkelpop in August 2008.

By the end of what became a two-year touring period, Hynes had suffered severe damage to his throat, and had to undergo extensive surgery. He took a two and a half-year hiatus from touring, appearing occasionally to play shows in New York and a top billed slot at the Carling Festival in 2009. In December 2008, Hynes was asked on behalf of the British Film Institute to perform the soundtrack of the cult Hal Ashby film Harold and Maude after a screening of the performance. Hynes had to cancel this due to an operation he had to undergo on his throat. The event was rescheduled for May 2009. In July 2009 Hynes reprised the soundtrack and performed at Latitude Festival. In June 2009, Hynes performed at the Barbican Centre in London in commemoration of the composer Moondog, singing renditions along with London Saxophonic of songs from the Moondog album Sax Pax for a Sax. He also sang "Fujiyama Part 2" backed by the Britten Sinfonia. In April 2010, Hynes returned to the Barbican to perform with the Triffids for a special concert in honour of their singer David McComb along with Warren Ellis, Tindersticks and members of the Brian Jonestown Massacre. He returned for a two-week European tour in June 2010.

Hynes has recorded a number of bootlegs and unofficial releases, made available to the public through his blog and MySpace. These include an album written and recorded entirely in a day and an EP consisting of covers of Green Day songs. The second Lightspeed Champion album, Life Is Sweet! Nice to Meet You, was released in 2010. Hynes retired the project to focus fully on his Blood Orange project.

=== Blood Orange ===
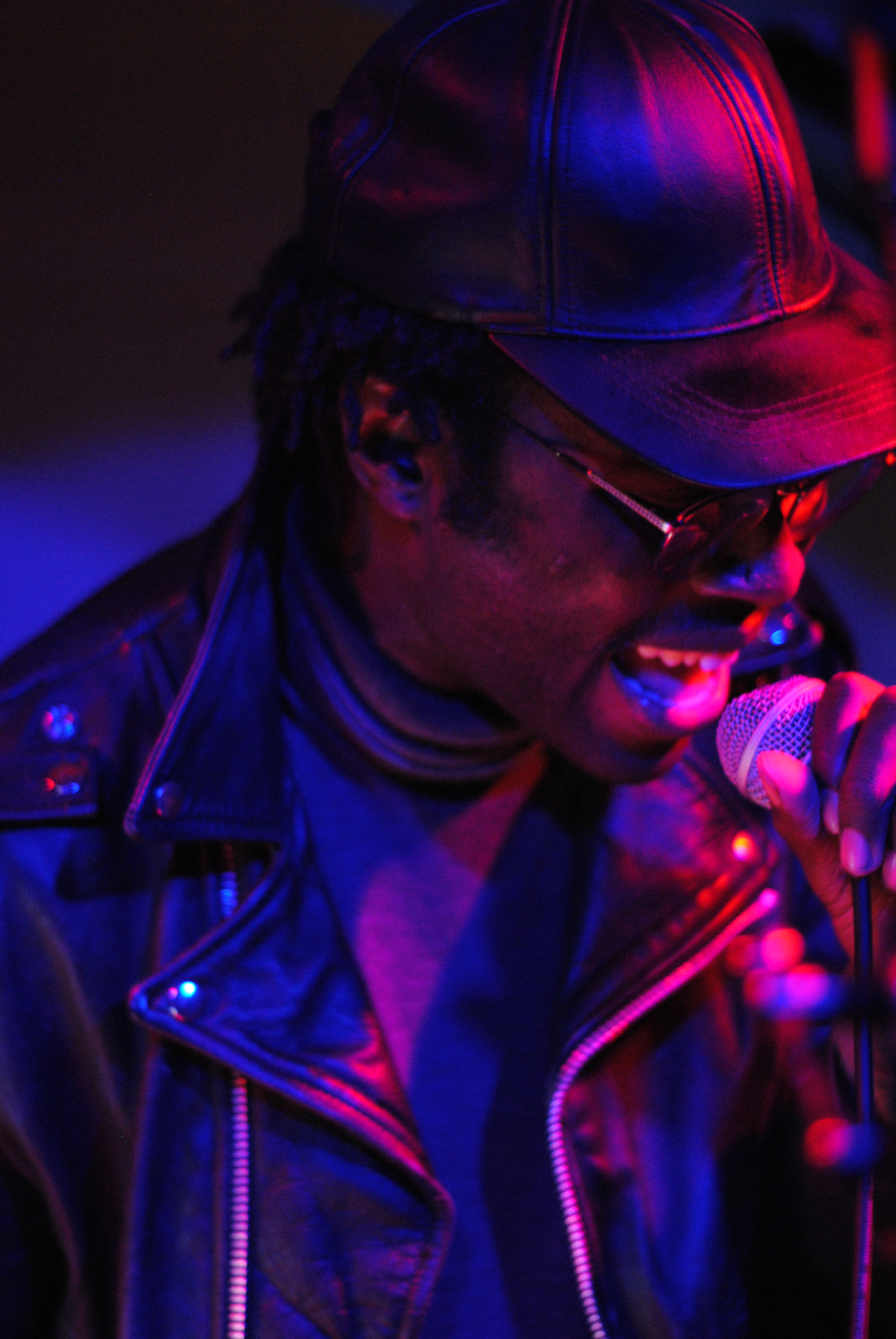
Hynes performing as Blood Orange in 2011

With Lightspeed Champion on effective hiatus, Hynes decided to concentrate on a new musical project more focused on R&B and electronica, called Blood Orange. Various live performances under this alias took place in New York and London within November and December 2009, consisting of Hynes, a guitar, and a laptop. On 17 December 2009, Hynes performed a song titled "Forget It" on the final It's On with Alexa Chung show on MTV. He performed to a backing track dressed in a wizard costume.

Hynes' debut single under the moniker Blood Orange, "Dinner", was released in January 2011 on Terrible Records, with an accompanying video directed by Alan Del Rio that debuted on Pitchfork TV. Following this, his full-length record Coastal Grooves was released in August 2011 on Domino Records. The song "Sutphin Boulevard" was featured on the 17 January 2011 premiere episode of the MTV show Skins. On 9 April 2012, Hynes embarked on a tour as Blood Orange opening for Florence and the Machine.

In November 2013, Hynes released the second Blood Orange album, Cupid Deluxe. The album features guest appearances, including performances from David Longstreth (of Dirty Projectors), Caroline Polachek (of Chairlift), Samantha Urbani (of Friends), Clams Casino, Despot, Kindness, Skepta and more. The album was promoted by three singles: "Chamakay", "You're Not Good Enough" and "Uncle ACE". The album was streamed in full on Hynes' own YouTube channel on 5 November 2013. The album also includes a cover of "I Can Only Disappoint U", originally by the British rock group Mansun under the title "Always Let You Down". In November, Blood Orange appeared on the cover of The Fader in its 89th issue. Hynes scored the 2013 film Palo Alto, directed by Gia Coppola.

On 8 January 2014, it was announced that Blood Orange was on the line-up for Coachella Valley Music and Arts Festival in Indio, California. In November 2015, Hynes released a collaborative EP with New Zealand psychedelic pop artist Connan Mockasin titled Myths 001: Collaborative Recordings Captured in Marfa, TX 9–16 March 2015.

On 18 April 2016, Hynes announced his third record under the Blood Orange moniker would be entitled Freetown Sound. It was released on 28 June 2016, three days ahead of the planned 1 July 2016 release. His album Freetown Sound was shortlisted by IMPALA (Independent Music Companies Association) for the Album of the Year Award 2016, which rewards on a yearly basis the best album released on an independent European label.

On 19 July 2018, he announced his fourth studio album under the Blood Orange moniker, Negro Swan, and released in the following week its first two singles: "Charcoal Baby" and "Jewelry". The album was released on 24 August 2018.

On 25 June 2019, Hynes announced his fifth release under the Blood Orange moniker in an interview with Cultured Magazine. The mixtape, titled Angel's Pulse, was released on 12 July 2019.

In 2022, Hynes performed alongside Liam Benzvi on The Tonight Show Starring Jimmy Fallon and Benzvi, Tariq Al-Sabir, Eva Tolkin, and Ian Isiah at Madison Square Garden as part of Harry Styles' Love On Tour.

In September 2022, it was announced Hynes had signed to RCA Records.

On June 26, 2025 Hynes released "The Field" (which features a sample of The Durutti Column's track "Sing To Me"), the lead single for his fifth studio album, Essex Honey, announced on July 17, 2025. That same day, he also released the dual single, "Somewhere in Between" and "Mind Loaded". The album's final single, "Countryside", was released on 27 August 2025, and the album itself was released on 29 August 2025. In support of Essex Honey, Hynes embarked on a North American and European tour during the autumn of 2025, including serving as a support act on both Lorde and Turnstile's respective tours, the Ultrasound World Tour and the Never Enough Tour.

On April 10 and 17, 2026 Hynes returned to the stage at Coachella Valley Music and Arts Festival as Blood Orange. He performed fan-favourite songs like "Champagne Coast" and "Bad Girls" on his set.

== Writing and producing for other artists ==
Hynes has written and contributed songs to a number of other acts. His arrangements and vocals have appeared on songs by the Chemical Brothers ("All Rights Reversed", from 2007's Grammy Award winning album We Are the Night), and Basement Jaxx, on their album Scars.

Hynes has co-written and produced songs for Diana Vickers on Songs from the Tainted Cherry Tree, another No. 1 debutante on the UK Albums Chart. He has also produced and written songs for Theophilus London, including his second album, Vibes, released in 2014, and the 2011 EP, Lovers Holiday, which he also featured on.

Hynes contributed music to the 2010 film MacGruber, including the duet "Rock My Body" with Saturday Night Live cast member Kristen Wiig. In late 2011, he produced Australian noise pop duo Bleeding Knees Club's debut album Nothing to Do, which was released on 2 March 2012. He co-wrote and co-produced Solange Knowles' 2012 EP True.

Hynes has co-written the song "Everything Is Embarrassing" for Sky Ferreira. He worked with Britney Spears on her eighth album, Britney Jean; however, none of his songs made the final cut.

Hynes worked with the then newly reformed original lineup of British R&B/pop group Sugababes—then performing as Mutya Keisha Siobhan—on their 2013 comeback single "Flatline". He also produced a remix of French group Phoenix's 2013 single "Entertainment", which featured vocals from Mutya Keisha Siobhan.

Hynes co-produced Buscabulla´s first EP "EP I - EP" published in 2014.

He co-wrote and co-produced Kylie Minogue's song "Crystallize", a charity single for One Note Against Cancer.

Hynes co-wrote and produced "All That" with Carly Rae Jepsen for her album Emotion, and also co-wrote "Body Language" for her EP Emotion: Side B.

He co-wrote two songs on Spector's second album, Moth Boys, "Cocktail Party / Heads Interlude" and "Decade of Decay". Hynes also co-wrote "Difficult Phone Call", a track on the extended version of the album. Hynes was also one of the producers on the album.

Hynes produced and was featured on "Hun43rd" by ASAP Rocky, from Rocky's third studio album, Testing.

He was also featured on Self Care by Mac Miller, off of Mac's album Swimming.

Hynes and collaborator Ian Isiah co-created and performed an adaptation of "Grateful" by gospel singer Hezekiah Walker for a fashion show by New York-based designer Telfar Clemens.

Hynes co-wrote Blondie's single "Long Time" with Deborah Harry, which was included on the band's eleventh album Pollinator. It was released as its second single and reached the #5 on the Billboard's Hot Dance Chart and #19 on the Adult Alternative Songs.

In 2021, he was also featured on "Alien Love Call", a single by Turnstile.

In 2024, Orange collaborated with Nathy Peluso on the single "El Día Que Me Perdí Mi Juventud" from Peluso's album Grasa.

In 2024, Hynes composed music for the Broadway production of Job.

In 2025, Hynes wrote two songs for Daniel Caesar's album Son of Spergy. "Touching God", which he featured in and "Baby Blue."

In 2025, Hynes produced the album “We Are Love” for UK band “The Charlatans.”

== Classical music and scores ==
Hynes has collaborated several times with composer Philip Glass, performing his piano Etudes for radio, at Carnegie Hall and the Kennedy Center.

Hynes has written scores for art pieces and film in collaboration with Alex Da Corte, Josh Kline & the Palo Alto score for the movie of the same name by Gia Coppola.

A special performance of Eastern Sports was performed at ICA Philadelphia in 2015 and at the Whitney Museum of Art in 2017.

Two performances of the Palo Alto score took place in 2016.

In 2019, Hynes composed the score for the film Queen & Slim, as well as a series of works for Third Coast Percussion which were released on the album Fields, which was nominated for a Grammy Award for Best Chamber Music/Small Ensemble Performance.

In 2022, he composed a symphonic piece for Naked Blue, a 17-minute film directed by Mati Diop and Manon Lutanie.

== Personal life ==
Hynes shared that he was sexually fluid in a 2016 interview, revealing that he had tried sex with men but 'it wasn’t [his] thing', and that he has dated transgender people before.

== Discography ==
=== As Blood Orange ===
Studio albums

- Coastal Grooves (2011)
- Cupid Deluxe (2013)
- Freetown Sound (2016)
- Negro Swan (2018)
- Essex Honey (2025)

Mixtapes & EPs

- Angel's Pulse (2019)
- Four Songs (2022)

=== As Lightspeed Champion ===
- Falling Off the Lavender Bridge (2008)
- Life Is Sweet! Nice to Meet You (2010)

=== As Devonté Hynes ===
Mixtapes & EPs

- Myths 001 (2015) (with Connan Mockasin)

Soundtracks

- Palo Alto (2013)
- Fields (2019) (with Third Coast Percussion)
- Queen & Slim (2019)
- We Are Who We Are (2020)
- Mainstream (2020)
- Passing (2021)
- Master Gardener (2022)
- The Invite (2026)
