= The Pilot (mixtape) =

2025 mixtape by Mavi

Mixtape by Mavi
- Released: November 25, 2025
- Recorded: 2024 – September 2025
- Genre: Hip-hop
- Length: 24:26
- Label: Loma Vista
- Producers: Asean Bwoy; Nephew Hesh; Angelo LeRoi; Cade; Kameron Cole; Michael Eliran; Lil Chick; Sango; Jay Versace; Reuben Vincent

Mavi chronology
| Shadowbox (2024) | The Pilot (2025) | First in Flight (TBA) |

Singles from The Pilot
- 1. "Landgrab" Released: May 27, 2025; 2. "Potluck" Released: June 24, 2025

The Pilot is the third mixtape by American rapper Mavi. It was released on November 25, 2025, through Loma Vista Recordings. The project marks a departure from his previous work, shifting from jazz rap and abstract lyricism to an eclectic and confrontational style. The Pilot was constructed when Mavi was sober, following a personal experience while touring for his previous album Shadowbox (2024). During its production, he worked on his personal improvement through muscle growth, therapy, and piano lessons. Mavi wanted to present a self-love approach in the mixtape as a positive representation for the Black community compared to the self-destructive nature of Shadowbox. Stylistically, The Pilot shows a more uptempo and confident tone, and is mainly autobiographical and based on sobriety and money.

The mixtape was preceded by the two singles, "Landgrab" (with Earl Sweatshirt) and "Potluck" (with Smino), a Colors performance video of "Silent Film", and a listening party. The Pilot received positive reviews from Pitchfork and The Daily Texan, both complimenting Mavi's artistic direction and use of flight and Afrofuturism as prominent themes, while it received criticism from The Fader, which viewed it as regressive. The mixtape received its only chart appearances on the North American College and Community Radio Chart (NACC), peaking at number 83, while topping its hip-hop chart for two weeks. The Pilot is considered the predecessor to Mavi's upcoming studio album First in Flight.

== Background ==
Mavi is a North Carolina-based rapper who received attention from his albums Let the Sun Talk (2019) and Laughing So Hard, It Hurts (2022). In 2024, Mavi released the album Shadowbox, which he later considered as "a trophy case to my failures" and that he was in a "Steve Nash era", likening himself to Nash's elevation from an all-star player to a two-time NBA MVP. Mavi retrospectively saw it as a "black hole" that is "small but super dense and super cold".

Outside of working on The Pilot in 2025, Mavi appeared on "Jammers Anonymous" with Niontay and "Swim" with Guapdad 4000 for the soundtrack of Him, also featuring on "Mavkast!" by Ovrkast. Outside of releasing music, he served as an opening act for Freddie Gibbs and the Alchemist's Alfredo 2 tour for two months. Mavi also opened for Earl Sweatshirt's 3L World Tour on a few dates.

== Development and production ==
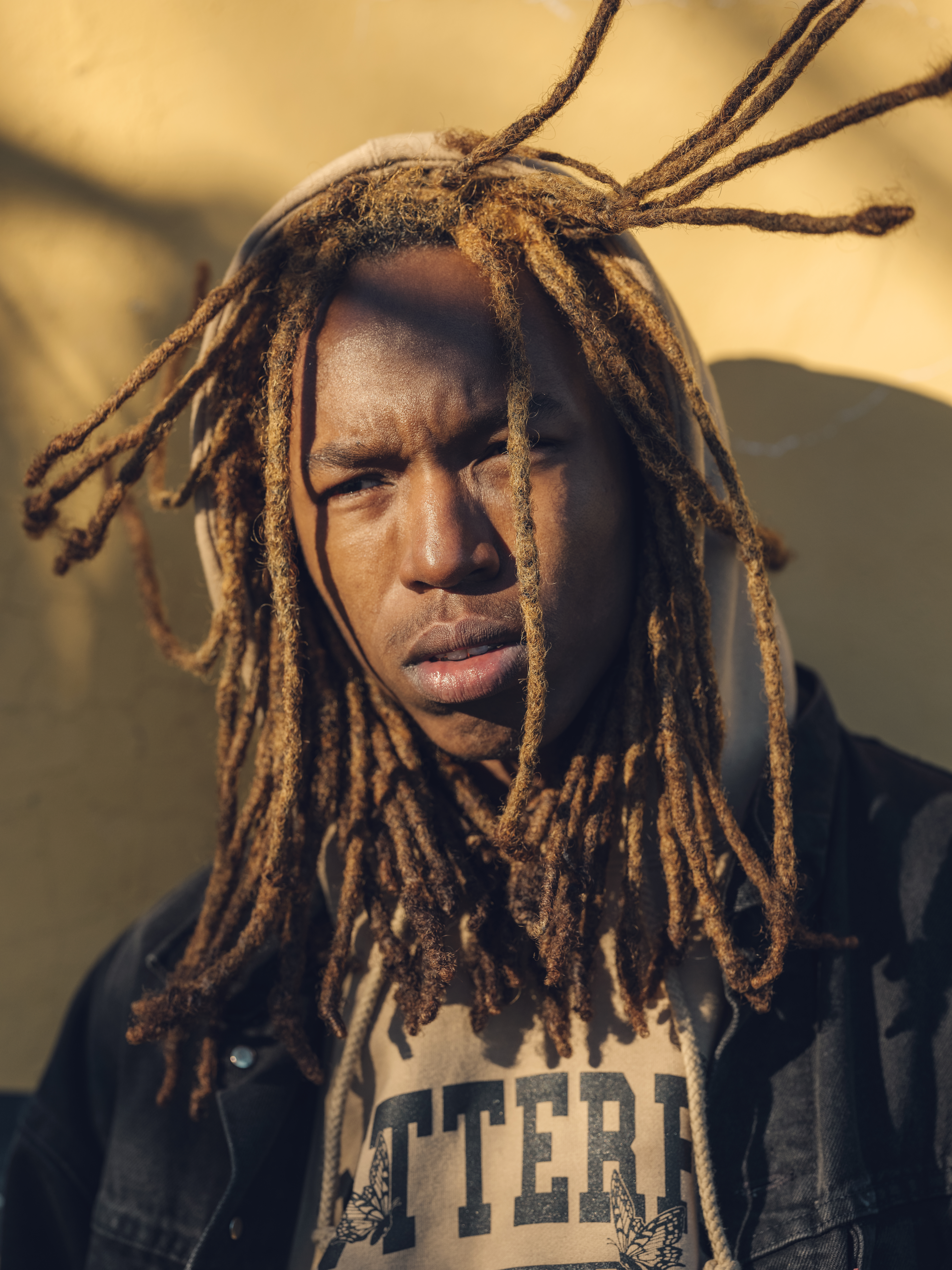
The Pilot is considered Mavi's (pictured in 2020) first project he recorded sober.

Mavi recorded The Pilot during his first year of sobriety. The mixtape is also considered to be his first project involving guest features, which include hip-hop musicians Earl Sweatshirt, Smino, Mike, and Kenny Mason. The Pilot began production in around 2024, and was finished in September 2025. At the time of its release, Mavi had been home for only 28 days in the last six months. He also worked on his upcoming album First in Flight, which he considered to be "85% done with."

After releasing Shadowbox, Mavi went on a concert tour to promote the album. Throughout the tour, he became increasingly disconnected from the album's content and was when he quit drinking. During a stop in Amsterdam, he visited the Banana Bar, which he described as a "super freaky sex pub". Being disgusted with the bar's sexual performances, he considered the experience to be the last time he drank. Afterwards, he made a promise to God about what he was "going to be going to do". During the production of The Pilot, he moved to an apartment above the Spectrum Arena, put on ten pounds of muscle, and entered therapy and piano lessons. He considered the timing of the mixtape's production as the best he felt and said he had fun recording in the studio for the first time since his teenage years.

Mavi compared The Pilot to his predecessor Shadowbox, labeling the former as a more "structured, intentional lifestyle" with a collaborative and "free-flowing creative atmosphere", compared to the latter's hedonism and "strictly disciplined creative language". In a Rolling Stone interview from 2024, his initial mindset was to become one of the greatest rappers, but shifted by the following year, wanting to explore more artistic perspectives and become meaningful to his city and the Black community. Mavi considered his former self-destructive image as pathetic and "dangerous for the kids to perpetuate as a stereotype", instead promoting self-love as a "powerful image for Black men".

Being less adherent to thematic structure, Mavi described The Pilot as more autobiographical. He revealed that the title was inspired by television pilot episodes and aviation. With Mavi explaining it in a more personal lens, he stated that it referred to a growing version of himself through traveling, exposure to new artistic perspectives, and alienation from home. He considered these experiences to serve as an "introduction to the rejuvenated, yet seasoned Mavi".

== Composition ==
=== Overview ===
The Pilot is a hip-hop mixtape with a running time of twenty-four and twenty-six seconds. The mixtape's tracks are usually short, with one reaching the three-minute mark. The Pilot marks a shift from Mavi's jazz rap routes and abstract lyricism to a more eclectic and confrontational style. Tom Breihan of Stereogum described Mavi's vocals as "really energetic and locked-in" compared to the muttering of his earlier project. Andrew Sacher of BrooklynVegan considered the mixtape's style to range from "chilled-out jazz to orchestral swells". According to Pitchfork writer Stephen Kearse, The Pilot showcases a more up-tempo, confident, and pristine style, with Mavi's lyricism reflecting on money and sobriety. Unlike his previous works, instead of confessional lyricism, Mavi mostly narrates a life of "designer fragrances and fits, foreign travel, and trips to the bank."

=== Tracks ===
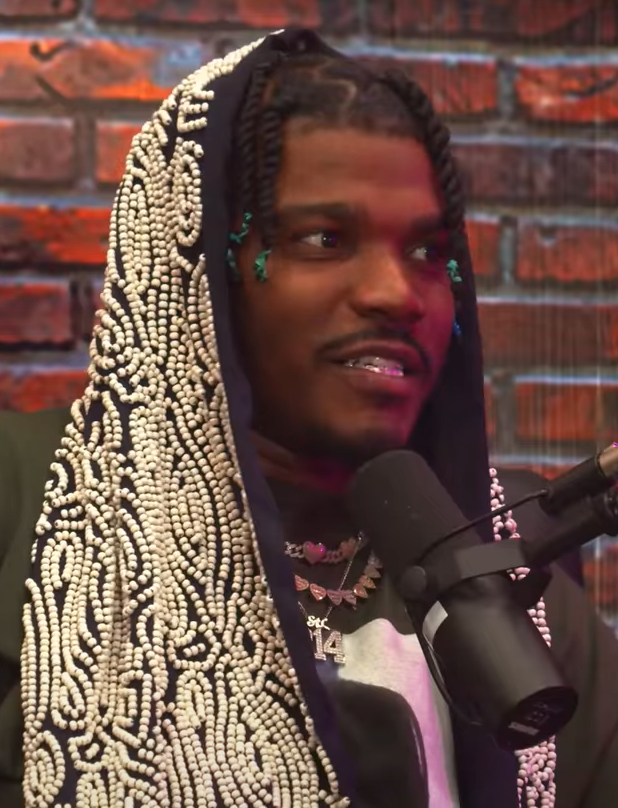
The final track "Potluck" features a soulful verse from Smino

"Heavy Hand" opens with a reintroduction from Mavi, where he frames his sobriety with bravado and humor, particularly the line "I'm the best dressed nigga on my therapist's couch." "Triple Nickel" features the use of horns through a collaboration with Mike. "Silent Film", a dance-influenced track set to mellow chords and a shuffling breakbeat, is "casually breathless" in Mavi's lyrical style. With booming trap drums, "G-Annis Freestyle" showcases Mavi's braggadocious side not seen in his previous works. Dropping out of Harvard University's neuroscience program to prioritize his music career, he brags his financial success through his music. The track's production uses "thick bass kicks and lolled effects" that Stephen Kearse of Pitchfork described as "Peanuts adults speaking with mouthfuls of tahini."

"Typewriter" contains many instruments and textures in its sample, including an elegant multipart horn and string loop, as Mavi and Kenny Mason rap through their "slick double-times." "31 Days", written on the 31st day of Mavi's sobriety, reveals Mavi's thoughts even when they clash with his intentions. "Denise Murrell" emphasizes the use of flute trills. "Mender" turns an image of freedom into one of precocity through a soul sample. Featuring saturated strings, soul loops, and a style of "chilled-out showtime rap", "Landgrab" shows Mavi and Earl Sweatshirt exchanging bars in a 90-second timeframe. Rapped back-to-forth, the two reference Black figures John Henry, Michael Olowokandi, and Rick Owens in a way considered "silly, serious, and exquisitely precise." "Potluck" reveals Mavi's melodic style that meanders "between rapping sand singing over two simple alternating synth chords", as Smino brings a soulful spirit to the track.

== Artwork ==
The album artwork for The Pilot depicts Mavi in a "fitted wing suit" with influence from Japanese fashion editorial photographs, symbolizing multiple truths on artistic growth, flying, fame, and more money. When asked about the cover, Mavi credited Issey Miyake as a significant influence, particularly his coffee table book Pleats Please. What made him intrigued in Japanese art was the use of "confluence and middle Venn diagram with African design languages, and themes."

== Promotion and release ==
On May 27, 2025, Mavi released the mixtape's debut single "Landgrab", featuring Earl Sweatshirt, with an accompanying music video. The music video, directed by Jesse Fox Hallen, features the two rappers in a "greenhouse-resembling space" as the greenery resembles the shape of its single artwork. It is considered the first single from Mavi to feature a guest artist, with the approach being Sweatshirt's idea to collaborate. Pitchfork labeled the song a "Best New Track". On June 24, Mavi released the mixtape's second single "Potluck", featuring Smino, with an accompanying music video directed by Sam Stone.

On November 7, 2025, Mavi previewed a performance of "Silent Film" on Colors, which is a German platform that specializes on videos of emerging artists performing in a minimalist set. On November 17, Mavi debuted The Pilot during a listening event at Galerie on Sunset in Los Angeles, which was also his one-year sobriety anniversary. Multiple guests including Mike, Sideshow, Cousteau, Jordan, Saba, and Redveil showed up to the event. The following day, he announced the mixtape along with its artwork and track list, stating that it would release the following week. On November 25, The Pilot was released through Loma Vista Recordings. On January 7, 2026, the music video for "Triple Nickel", featuring Mike, was released through YouTube. It was directed by Wyeth Collins and shot in New York City.

== Reception ==
Professional ratings
Review scores
| Source | Rating |
|---|---|
| The Daily Texan | 3.5/5 stars |
| Pitchfork | 7.4/10 |

Pitchfork writer Stephen Kearse described Mavi's mission in The Pilot as showcasing "every version of himself all at once—the soothsayer, the spitter, the misanthrope, the YRN", giving insight to many of the mixtape's tracks and complimenting his new artistic style. Adam Elayan of The Daily Texan gave a positive review about the mixtape, noting Mavi's reinvention and themes of flight and Afrofuturism in anticipation of his upcoming album.

Vivian Medithi gave a more critical review of The Pilot, considering it "underwhelmingly flat" and that his new aggressive style "undercuts the nuanced persona he's striving to portray." She compared the mixtape to Kendrick Lamar's GNX (2024) as an example of a "low-stakes project for a rapper to let loose and flex a little." The Pilot entered the North American College and Community Radio Chart (NACC) at number 165, dated December 9, 2025. It later peaked at number 83 on the chart, dated January 20, 2026. In addition, the mixtape topped its "Top 30 Hip Hop" chart for two weeks, dated February 10 and February 17, 2026.

== Track listing ==
| No. | Title | Writer(s) | Producer | Length |
|---|---|---|---|---|
| 1. | "Heavy Hand" | Omavi Ammu Minder; Angelo LeRoi | Angelo LeRoi | 1:49 |
| 2. | "Triple Nickel" (featuring Mike) | Minder; Michael Bonema; LeRoi | Angelo LeRoi | 2:37 |
| 3. | "Silent Film" | Minder; Robert Davis; Sebastien Genodia | Asean Bwoy; Nephew Hesh | 2:02 |
| 4. | "G-Annis Freestyle" | Minder; Reuben Vincent | Reuben Vincent | 2:32 |
| 5. | "Typewriter" (featuring Kenny Mason) | Minder; Tristán Jasmin | Lil Chick | 3:31 |
| 6. | "31 Days" | Minder; Michael Elian | Michael Eliran | 2:54 |
| 7. | "Denise Murrell" | Minder; Kai Wright | Sango | 2:17 |
| 8. | "Mender" | Minder; Jahil Gunter | Jay Versace | 2:41 |
| 9. | "Landgrab" (featuring Earl Sweatshirt) | Minder; Thebe Kgositsille; Kameron Cole | Kameron Cole | 1:28 |
| 10. | "Potluck" (featuring Smino) | Minder; Christopher Smith Jr.; Cade Phillip Blodgett; Davis; Genodia | Asean Bwoy; Cade; Nephew Hesh | 2:35 |
| Total length: | | | | 24:26 |

== Personnel ==
Credits are adapted from Tidal.

Musicians

- Michael Elian – additional production (1)
- Ovrkast – additional production (1)

Technicians

- Demitrius Lewis II – mastering engineer (1–8)
- Jeff Thompson – mixing engineer (1–8; 10); recording engineer (1–4; 7–8; 10)
- Michael Bonema – recording engineer (2)
- Elias Cash Reitzfeld – recording engineer (5–6)
- Joshua Pleeter – mastering engineer (9)
- Nathan Phillips – mixing engineer (9)
- Ryan Rajagopal – mixing engineer (9)
- Benji Miller – recording engineer (9)
- Preston Reid – mastering engineer (10)

== Charts ==
Chart performance for The Pilot
| Chart (2025–2026) | Peak position |
|---|---|
| US & Canadian College Radio Top 200 (NACC) | 83 |
| US & Canadian College Radio Top 30 Hip Hop (NACC) | 1 |
