= Septet (disambiguation) =

A septet is a formation containing exactly seven members.

Septet may also refer to:

- Septet (Beethoven)
- Septet (Saint-Saëns)
- Septet (Stravinsky)
- Septet (Chick Corea album), 1985
- Septet (John Carroll Kirby album), 2021
- Septet: The Story of Hong Kong, a 2020 Hong Kong anthology historical drama film
