= Lay Low (album) =

Studio album by Eddie Chacon
- Released: January 31, 2025
- Genre: Pop; R&B
- Length: 28:57
- Label: Stones Throw
- Producer: Nick Hakim

Lay Low is the third solo album by American singer Eddie Chacon. It was released by Stones Throw Records on January 31, 2025, and was met with positive reviews.

== Background and composition ==
Speaking to Mojo, Eddie Chacon said that it was "a record about the grief of losing my mother, the melancholy, sadness and ultimately the healing".

Lay Low is a pop and R&B album. It was produced by Nick Hakim, who appears on the track "Birds". The track "Empire" has a guest appearance from John Carroll Kirby.

== Release and reception ==
Professional ratings
Review scores
Source	Rating
AllMusic	4/5 stars
Mojo	4/5 stars
Pitchfork	7.4/10

Lay Low was released by Stones Throw Records on January 31, 2025. It is Eddie Chacon's third solo album, and follows his second solo album Sundown (2023). Upon its release, Lay Low received positive reviews from AllMusic, Pitchfork, and Mojo.

== Track listing ==
No.	Title	Length
1.	"Good Sun"	4:04
2.	"Let You Go"	3:06
3.	"Empire" (featuring John Carroll Kirby)	2:59
4.	"Lay Low"	3:30
5.	"Birds" (featuring Nick Hakim)	3:14
6.	"Let the Devil In"	3:48
7.	"End of the World"	3:39
8.	"If I Ever Let You Go"	4:33
Total length:		28:57
