= Chaos Now =

2022 album by Jean Dawson

Studio album by Jean Dawson
- Released: October 7, 2022
- Genre: Grunge; pop-punk; indie rock; hip-hop
- Length: 35:42
- Label: P+
- Producer: Jean Dawson (also exec.); Ray Brady; Wyatt Bernard; Austin Corona; Nate Sherman; Ty Mayer; Zach Fogarty; Joel McClain; Johan Lenox; Rob McCurdy; Elliot Kozel; George Clanton; Jesse Schuster; John Carroll Kirby

Jean Dawson chronology
Pixel Bath (2020)	Chaos Now (2022)	Boohoo (2024)

Singles from Chaos Now
- 1. "Porn Acting" Released: February 27, 2022; 2. "Three Heads" Released: August 19, 2022; 3. "Pirate Radio" Released: September 16, 2022; 4. "Sick of It" Released: September 29, 2022; 5. "Bad Fruit" Released: October 5, 2022

Chaos Now (stylized as CHAOS NOW*) is the second (Note: Dawson's 2019 release Bad Sports has been variously referred to as an album, an EP, and a mixtape. If Bad Sports was considered Dawson's debut album, Chaos Now would be his third.) studio album by experimental pop musician Jean Dawson, released on October 7, 2022, by the artist's label P+. The album was announced August 19 along with the release of single "Three Heads", with a music video directed by Bradley J. Calder, as well as the artist's first US headlining tour. "Porn Acting" was released as a prior single on February 27, third single "Pirate Radio" followed on September 16, fourth single "Sick of It" released September 29, and fifth single "Bad Fruit" featuring Earl Sweatshirt was released October 5.

== Background ==
In an interview with Maxine Wally for W, Dawson admitted difficulty with completing the album. He spent months in his bedroom in Inglewood, California working on it, comparing his room to "those movies where a dude is trying to figure out a crime and they have pieces of yarn connected to pins on the wall." He also admitted to scrapping two previous versions of the album, one which resembled an EP which Dawson says he "vehemently" hates, and the other because it wasn't "profound enough. I was just saying words."

The album's and song's names are all stylized in all caps with an asterisk on the end. Dawson described the asterisk as "the way I use periods. Instead of it being like a mundane little dot, it's like a firework."

== Style and reception ==
Chaos Now ratings
Aggregate scores
Source	Rating
Metacritic	80/100
Review scores
Source	Rating
AllMusic	4/5 stars
Clash	8/10
DIY	4.5/5 stars
The Line of Best Fit	5/10
Sputnikmusic	4/5

According to the review aggregator Metacritic, Chaos Now received "generally favorable reviews" based on a weighted average score of 80 out of 100 from 5 critic scores.

Clash's James Mellen calls the album "a shapeshifting creation, blasting through acoustic balladry, hip-hop elements and frantic distorted guitars." Mellen considers "Glory" "a song ready for arenas" with "reverb-soaked drums matched by the heavy guitars" and "Dawson's searing vocals"; says "Bad Fruit", featuring "alternative hip-hop heavyweight" Earl Sweatshirt, "is a softer number on the album" with "sombre guitar work", orchestral passages, and "twinkling percussion" adding "a cinematic dimension to the track"; calls closing track "Pirate Radio" "a beautiful acoustic moment spurred on by delicate guitars and folk-tinted strings and wind sections"; and closes by saying the album "took everything that made Pixel Bath so incredible and just elevates it."

DIY's Emma Swann calls the album "an exhilarating meeting of grunge, pop-punk and indie with hip-hop rhythms", comparing to "Beck if he'd used a palette of early '00s MTV2." Swann further compares "Three Heads" as "mak[ing] like Bloc Party's "Helicopter" at slow speed to soundtrack a nu metal vocal break", "0-Heroes" as "giv[ing] Nirvana guitars a stadium-sized chorus", says "Screw Face" and "Porn Acting" "could've fallen right out of Fidlar's catalogue", and notes "a smirk towards Billie Eilish's "Bury a Friend" amid the industrial glitches" of "Kids Eat Pills". Swann concludes by quoting intro track "*" where Dawson asks "Fuck y'all looking at?", saying "A superstar, is the answer."

In a more negative review, The Line of Best Fit's Kyle Kohner says that Dawson "stagnates in the groove of his zany musical habits". While Dawson "communicates what it means and what it could look like to embrace your inner-outsider", Kohner feels "often left waiting for that sentiment to manifest in full musically, by subverting genre conventions with a foot unflinchingly pressed on the proverbial gas pedal of experimentalism." Chaos Now is "not the genre-eliminating record that [Dawson] had declared it to be and that many had hoped for", instead adopting "the same scraped-together, playlist-emulating approach with little-to-no push to be even weirder."

== Track listing ==
All tracks are written by Jean Dawson, with additional writing on track 6 by Thebe Neruda Kgositsile. All tracks except 7 produced by Dawson, with additional producers below.

Chaos Now track listing
No.	Title	Producers	Length
1.	"*"	Ray Brady; Wyatt Bernard	0:14
2.	"Three Heads"	Austin Corona; Nate Sherman; Ty Mayer; Bernard	2:52
3.	"Glory"	Corona; Bernard; Zach Fogarty	3:15
4.	"Kids Eat Pills"	Corona; Joel McClain; Bernard	2:31
5.	"Positive 1 Negative 1"	Brady	3:17
6.	"Bad Fruit" (featuring Earl Sweatshirt)	Corona; Johan Lenox; Brady; Rob McCurdy; Bernard; Fogarty	3:27
7.	"0-Heroes"	Brady	2:34
8.	"Screw Face"	Corona; Elliot Kozel; Bernard; Fogarty	3:51
9.	"Porn Acting"	Corona; Bernard; Fogarty	2:52
10.	"Black Michael Jackson" (featuring George Clanton)	Clanton; Jesse Schuster; John Carroll Kirby; Brady; Fogarty	2:52
11.	"Huh"	Corona; Brady	2:39
12.	"Sick of It"	Corona; Brady; Bernard	2:09
13.	"Pirate Radio"	Corona; Schuster; Lenox; Bernard	3:09
Total length:			35:42

Notes

- All tracks except 1 stylized in all caps with an asterisk at the end (e.g. "THREE HEADS*").

== Personnel ==
- Jean Dawson – vocals, executive producer
- Nathan Phillips – mixing engineer
- Dale Becker – mastering engineer

== Charts ==
Chaos Now charts
Chart (2022)	Peak position
US Heatseekers Albums (Billboard)	35
