= Samara Cyn =

American musician

- Born: Samara Henderson; September 15, 1998 (age 28); Murfreesboro, Tennessee, U.S.
- Education: Arizona State University (BS)
- Genres: Hip-hop; neo soul
- Occupations: Rapper; singer; songwriter
- Years active: 2019–present
- Label: Vanta

Samara Henderson, known professionally as Samara Cyn (/sɪn/), is an American rapper, singer, and songwriter. In 2024, she released her debut EP, The Drive Home.

== Early life and education ==
Samara Henderson was born in Murfreesboro, Tennessee. Growing up, she also lived in Augusta, Georgia, El Paso, Texas, Hawaii and Colorado. Her mother was an English teacher and her father was in the army, which caused the family to relocate frequently. She began writing poetry in fifth grade when she was bored, encouraged by her mother, who introduced her to Brave New Voices. She credits her father with sparking her interest in hip-hop, in particular by introducing her to Slick Rick's debut album The Great Adventures of Slick Rick. Her interest in poetry developed while attending Arizona State University, where she performed at Poetic Soul, a weekly open mic. After a night out in her second year of college, while her friends were rapping, she rapped one of her poems to a beat, and her interest in poetry became an interest in creating music. She graduated in May 2021 with a Bachelor’s in Supply Chain Management.

== Career ==
=== Before The Drive Home ===
After writing her first song in 2019, Cyn performed her first live show in November of that same year. In November 2021, she opened for Teddy Swims in Arizona. In 2024, she opened for Isaiah Rashad on his Cilvia Demo 10 Year Anniversary Tour.

=== The Drive Home ===
After releasing her debut EP The Drive Home in 2024, she was co-signed by Erykah Badu and Lauryn Hill. In November 2024, she opened for Nas on his Illmatic 30-year anniversary tour in London. In March 2025, Cyn performed with Hill at the Jazz in the Gardens Festival in Miami. At the 2025 South by Southwest festival, Cyn won the Grulke Prize for Developing U.S. Act.

=== Kountry Kousins tour and Backroads ===
Starting on April 23, 2025 in Vancouver, Cyn supported Smino on his Kountry Kousins tour through North America. Her second EP, Backroads, was released on June 20, 2025. It was ranked as the 6th best EP of 2025 by Spin, a top 10 EP of 2025 by Hypebeast, and the 14th best rap album of 2025 by Billboard. It contains five songs, including the single "Brand New Teeth" featuring Smino. The same month, she was selected for the 2025 XXL freshman class. On July 23, 2025, Cyn made her late-night television debut on The Daily Show, performing her song "Hardheaded". Cyn was named the BET Amplified Artist of the Month for August 2025. In October 2025, she released the single "Vitamins N Minerals", produced by Ovrkast. Complex rated the song's second verse as the 24th-best rap verse of 2025. She performed at Camp Flog Gnaw Carnival in November 2025. On December 12, 2025, she released the single "What Will They Say".

=== Detour ===
Cyn's EP, Detour was released on March 20, 2026. It includes the single "oooshxt!" On March 31, 2026, she announced The Detour, a 4-date North American tour in May 2026. On September 9, 2026, Cyn was given Billboard's 2026 Hip-Hop Rising Star award, and the next night performed at Billboard's R&B Hip-Hop Live show in Brooklyn. Cyn was ranked 17th on the 2026 Complex list of 20 Best Rappers in Their 20s.

== Discography ==
=== Extended plays ===
Title	Album details
The Drive Home	Released: October 25, 2024; Formats: Digital download, streaming; Label: Vanta
Backroads	Released: June 20, 2025; Formats: Digital download, streaming; Label: Vanta
Detour	Released: March 20, 2026; Formats: Digital download, streaming; Label: Vanta

=== Singles ===
- "Backseat" (2022)
- "Pride's Interlude" (2023)
- "Auto-Pilot" (2023)
- "Wake Up" (2023)
- "Moving Day" (2024)
- "Magnolia Rain" (2024)
- "Katana" (2024)
- "Chrome" (2024)
- "Sinner" (2024)
- "Pop n Olive" (2025)
- "Bad Brain" (2025)
- "Brand New Teeth" (2025) (with Smino)
- "Vitamins n Minerals" (2025) (produced by Ovrkast)
- "what will they say" (2025)
- “oooshxt!” (2026)

=== Guest appearances ===
- "Janky Moral Compass" (2025) (Ray Vaughn featuring Samara Cyn and Sydney Leona)
- "Ghost" (2025) (Armani White featuring Samara Cyn)
- "For Sixxx In The Mornin" (2026) (Jessie Reyez featuring Samara Cyn)
