= My Garden (John Carroll Kirby album) =

Studio album by John Carroll Kirby
- Released: April 24, 2020
- Studio: Roundhead Studios (Auckland, New Zealand); Gaerloch Studios (Sydney, Australia)
- Genre: Soul jazz
- Label: Stones Throw
- Producer: John Carroll Kirby

John Carroll Kirby chronology
Conflict (2020)	My Garden (2020)	Septet (2021)

My Garden is the fifth solo studio album by American keyboardist and record producer John Carroll Kirby. It was released on April 24, 2020, via Stones Throw Records, making it the artist's second album for the label, following up Conflict, which was dropped twenty-two days before. Recording sessions took place at Roundhead Studios in Auckland, and at Gaerloch and Gaerloch Studios in Sydney. It features contributions from New Zealand musician Neil Finn and Manila-born Los Angeles-based bassist J. P. Maramba.

Music videos for "By the Sea" and "Wind" were directed by Michael Flanagan. Music video for "Blueberry Beads" was directed by Kirby and Angela Suarez.

== Critical reception ==
Professional ratings
Aggregate scores
Source	Rating
Metacritic	76/100
Review scores
Source	Rating
AllMusic	4/5 stars
Loud and Quiet	6/10
Mojo	4/5 stars
Pitchfork	6.7/10
Q	4/5
The Line of Best Fit	3.5/10

My Garden was met with generally favorable reviews from music critics. At Metacritic, which assigns a normalized rating out of 100 to reviews from mainstream publications, the album received an average score of 76, based on five reviews, which indicates "generally positive reviews".

AllMusic's Andy Kellman wrote: "whether compared to the progressions of Kirby's cross-continental inspirations (Tsegué-Maryam Guèbrou, Andrew Hill, Yoshio Suzuki) or those of his nearest contemporaries (such as Garrett and Bremer/McCoy), My Garden is its own gratifying thing". Mojo reviewer summed it up positively with "earworms abound". Q reviewer stated that "he revisits an early interest in exotica, the '50s faux-tropical lounge style, creating mood music with a global twist". Nathan Taylor Pemberton of Pitchfork wrote: "Kirby's competent home production, and his economic arrangements, amount to a rich product that still manages to sound one-dimensional on repeat listenings, with little sonic depth. And his predilection for the occasional bright melody line works at cross purposes with his atmospheric tendencies. The album can never fully let itself recede into pure ambience". Sam Walton of Loud and Quiet found the album "perhaps a more apt portrait of its creator than Kirby may quite have intended: full of promise and intelligence, and with undeniable musical nous, but without the pizzazz required to shine alone". Liam Inscoe-Jones of The Line of Best Fit found it "utterly forgettable".

== Track listing ==
No.	Title	Length
1.	"Blueberry Beads"	3:27
2.	"By the Sea"	4:59
3.	"Night Croc"	3:29
4.	"Arroyo Seco"	4:48
5.	"Son of Pucabufeo"	1:59
6.	"San Nicolas Island"	1:52
7.	"Humid Mood"	3:17
8.	"Lay You Down"	2:48
9.	"Wind"	5:27

== Personnel ==
- John Carroll Kirby – performer, composer, recording, mixing
- John Paul Maramba – bass (track 1)
- Neil Finn – percussion
- Jake Viator – additional mixing, mastering
- Eddie Chacon – photography
