= Him (soundtrack) =

Him (Original Motion Picture Soundtrack)

Soundtrack album by Bobby Krlic
- Released: September 19, 2025
- Genre: Hip-hop; trap
- Length: 74:14
- Label: Loma Vista; Back Lot Music
- Producer: Bobby Krlic

Bobby Krlic chronology
Eenie Meanie (2025)	Him (2025)	Anemone (2025)

Him (Original Motion Picture Soundtrack) is the soundtrack album to the 2025 film Him directed by Justin Tipping starring Marlon Wayans, Tyriq Withers, Julia Fox and Tim Heidecker. The soundtrack accompanied original score composed by Bobby Krlic, and songs performed by Mobb Deep, Gucci Mane, Guapdad 4000, Mavi, Tierra Whack, Jean Dawson and Denzel Curry. Led by four singles, the soundtrack was released on the same date as the film, September 19, 2025, under the Loma Vista Recordings and Back Lot Music labels.

== Background ==
Bobby Krlic had composed the score for the film by April 2025. While discussing with Tipping on what power sounds like, the duo factored in the use of the term "him" and its omnipresence in hip-hop and sports culture. They discussed about the idea of Cameron's dream to be the best on the planet but factored on how we could musically twist and subvert that dream. Besides the music, Krlic made use of unconventional sounds to amplify the intensity. The composer imaged the sound through pictures, and sampled MRI sounds before composing the actual score for a trap beat.

The film also featured original songs composed and produced by Krlic himself and collaborated with several rappers and artists such as Denzel Curry, Jean Dawson and the lead actor Marlon Wayans himself. Tierra Whack and Guapdad 4000 also make their cinematic debuts with the film, performing few songs.

== Release ==
The soundtrack featuring 28 tracks including original score and songs. The album released on September 19, 2025, alongside the film through Loma Vista Recordings and Universal Pictures' in-house label Back Lot Music. A vinyl edition of the album is scheduled to be release through Waxwork Records on November 21, 2025.

=== Singles ===
The album was preceded by the lead singles, "Swim" by Guapdad 4000 and Mavi, and "Tip Toe" by Tierra Whack, which were released as singles on September 4, 2025. "Blitz" was released by Jean Dawson as the soundtrack's third single on September 10, 2025, while the fourth single, "Him" by Denzel Curry, was released on September 18, 2025.

== Track listing ==
Him (Original Motion Picture Soundtrack) track listing
No.	Title	Performer(s)	Length
1.	"\_(ツ)_/¯"	Marlon Wayans	0:27
2.	"Lemonade"	Gucci Mane	4:06
3.	"The Combine"		1:17
4.	"Live That Life"	Maxo Kream	2:56
5.	"Goin' to the League!"		1:26
6.	"Shook Ones, Part II"	Mobb Deep	5:27
7.	"Find Your Own Way to Glory"		1:59
8.	"Tip Toe"	Tierra Whack	2:58
9.	"Swim"	Guapdad 4000 featuring Mavi	2:26
10.	"Party on the Westside"	LaRussell and Mike & Keys featuring Larry June	3:29
11.	"Cameron Cade"		1:55
12.	"One and Only Him"	OG DAYV	2:52
13.	"Dead Body Alert"		3:02
14.	"GOAT"	Sampa the Great	1:50
15.	"All the Glory…All the Defeat"		4:04
16.	"Italy"	Maglera Doe Boy and ONDELIVE	3:37
17.	"The Physical"		2:27
18.	"CUT UP"	Ovrkast	2:05
19.	"Bill Russell"	Koran Streets	2:20
20.	"Elsie"		0:21
21.	"AIGHT?"	Carl Angelo	3:08
22.	"Discipline"		1:56
23.	"Real Killers"		2:45
24.	"Blitz"	Jean Dawson	2:47
25.	"The Opposite of a Mascot"		1:51
26.	"USFF Theme"		1:19
27.	"Killing Spree"		3:39
28.	"Him"	Denzel Curry	2:13
Total length:			74:14

== Reception ==
Bill Dubiel of Screen Rant wrote "[the film's] dynamic soundtrack provides the perfect backdrop to the movie's twisted narrative [and] leans heavily into hip-hop and modern rap, accenting with hymns and powerful orchestra pieces for impact in some of the movie's most gruesome yet important scenes." Beatrice Loayza of The New York Times noted that the soundtrack "churns out one banger after the next" but the film heavily overrelies on it and did not help in the pacing of the narrative. Frank Scheck of The Hollywood Reporter wrote "The musical score composed by Bobby Krlic, aka The Haxan Cloak, proves suitably unsettling." Amy Nicholson of Los Angeles Times wrote "Bobby Krlic (a.k.a. the Haxan Cloak), who also composed the music for Midsommar, wows us with a tragic, thundering score."

== Release history ==
Release history and formats for Him (Original Motion Picture Soundtrack)
Region	Date	Format(s)	Label(s)	Ref.
Various	September 19, 2025	Digital download; streaming	Loma Vista; Back Lot Music	
Various	November 21, 2025	CD; LP	Loma Vista; Waxwork Records; (Note: The LP release under Waxwork features a cover art by artist Trenton Doyle Hancock.)	
