= A Little Piece of Heaven =

"A Little Piece of Heaven" may refer to:

== Film ==
- A Little Piece of Heaven (film), a 1991 television film

== Music ==
- "A Little Piece of Heaven", a song by Kevin Coyne from the 1980 album Bursting Bubbles
- "Little Piece of Heaven", a song by Charles & Eddie from the 1995 album Chocolate Milk and by The Neville Brothers on the 1999 album Valence Street
- "A Little Piece of Heaven" (song), by Avenged Sevenfold on the 2007 album Avenged Sevenfold
- A Little Piece of Heaven, a 1993 album by Roger Ballard
- "A Little Piece of Heaven", a song by Godley & Creme from the 1988 album Goodbye Blue Sky
