= Exit Plan (film) =

2019 film by Jonas Alexander Arnby

- Film poster
- Danish: Selvmordsturisten
- Directed by: Jonas Alexander Arnby
- Written by: Rasmus Birch
- Produced by: Eva Jakobsen; Katrin Pors; Mikkel Jersin
- Starring: Nikolaj Coster-Waldau
- Cinematography: Niels Thastum
- Edited by: Yorgos Mavropsaridis
- Music by: Mikkel Hess
- Distributed by: Screen Media Films
- Release date: 3 October 2019 (Sitges)
- Running time: 90 minutes
- Countries: Denmark; Norway; Germany
- Languages: English; Danish
- Box office: $3,955

Exit Plan (Danish: Selvmordsturisten), also titled Suicide Tourist, is a 2019 Danish-Norwegian-German mystery drama film directed by Jonas Alexander Arnby and starring Nikolaj Coster-Waldau. The film premiered at the 2019 Sitges Film Festival.

== Synopsis ==
Insurance detective Max Isaksen investigates the cold case of Arthur's disappearance. The assignment takes him into the clandestine Aurora Hotel, a secretive facility that specializes in elaborate assisted suicide fantasies. While in the midst of an existential crisis, Max questions his perception of reality.

== Cast ==
- Nikolaj Coster-Waldau as Max Isaksen
- Tuva Novotny as Lærke
- Robert Aramayo as Ari
- Jan Bijvoet as Frank
- Solbjørg Højfeldt as Karen
- Sonja Richter as Alice Dinesen
- Lorraine Hilton as Jenny
- Slimane Dazi as Francois
- Johanna Wokalek as Linda
- Kaya Wilkins as Mia
- Kate Ashfield as Fake Mother

== Release ==
The film had its world premiere at the Sitges Film Festival on 3 October 2019. It was released in theaters and on VOD in the United States by Screen Media Films on 12 June 2020.

== Reception ==
=== Box office ===
Exit Plan grossed $0 in North America and $3,955 in Hungary.

=== Critical response ===
The film holds a 38% approval rating on review aggregator Rotten Tomatoes, based on 26 reviews, with a weighted average of 5.20/10. The website's critical consensus reads, "A would-be thriller that leans a little too hard into its hero's existential crisis, Exit Plan will leave most viewers looking for the door." On Metacritic, it holds a rating of 46 out of 100, based on 11 critics, indicating "mixed or average reviews". Lorry Kikta of Film Threat awarded the film a 10 out of 10. Hannah Hoolihan of Screen Rant awarded the film two and a half stars out of five. Tara McNamara of Common Sense Media awarded the film three stars out of five. Frank Scheck of The Hollywood Reporter gave the film a negative review and wrote, "Exit Plan plays like an existential thriller that unfortunately lacks both philosophical depth and thrills." Dennis Harvey of Variety also gave the film a negative review, describing it as "a movie that’s ultimately a little too polite and vague to make much of its intriguing premise." Glenn Kenny of RogerEbert.com awarded the film two stars and wrote, "And Coster-Waldau commits to his dull character sufficiently to be, well, dull." Katie Walsh of the Los Angeles Times also gave the film a negative review and wrote, "There is real potential in this premise, and a few flickers of genuine artfulness, but the storytelling is frustratingly abstruse, making for an Exit Plan that’s a real missed opportunity."
