= Chocolate milk (disambiguation) =

Chocolate milk is a milk drink flavored with chocolate.

Chocolate milk may also refer to:

- Chocolate Milk (band), a 1970s funk band from New Orleans
- Chocolate Milk (album), a 1995 album by Charles and Eddie
- "Chocolate Milk" (Brooklyn Nine-Nine), a television episode

== See also ==
- Category:Chocolate drinks
