= Sundown (Eddie Chacon album) =

Studio album by Eddie Chacon
- Released: March 31, 2023
- Studio: 64 Sound Studios (Highland Park, California); Villa Can Rudayla (Ibiza, Spain)
- Length: 34:38
- Label: Stones Throw
- Producer: John Carroll Kirby

Eddie Chacon chronology
Pleasure, Joy and Happiness (2020)	Sundown (2023)	Lay Low (2025)

Sundown is the second solo studio album by American singer Eddie Chacon. It was released on March 31, 2023, via Stones Throw Records. Recording sessions took place at 64 Sound Studios in Highland Park, California and at Villa Can Rudayla in Ibiza, Spain. Production was handled by John Carroll Kirby. It features contributions from John Carroll Kirby on keyboards, Logan Hone on alto saxophone and flute, Elizabeth Lea on trombone, William Logan on drums, and David Leach on percussion.

== Critical reception ==
Professional ratings
Aggregate scores
Source	Rating
Metacritic	87/100
Review scores
Source	Rating
AllMusic	4/5 stars
Mojo	4/5 stars
Pitchfork	7.2/10
Record Collector	4/5 stars
The Guardian	5/5 stars
Uncut	8/10

Sundown was met with universal acclaim from music critics. At Metacritic, which assigns a normalized rating out of 100 to reviews from mainstream publications, the album received an average score of 85 based on six reviews.

Alexis Petridis in his 5 out of 5 stars review for The Guardian wrote: "soothing, moving, occasionally disquieting and utterly immersive, Sundown suggests its predecessor was something else entirely: merely the first step of an entirely unlikely and entirely delightful career renaissance". AllMusic's Andy Kellman wrote: "the LP is another work of sophisticated simplicity with deliberation seemingly eschewed in favor of spontaneity. Due in significant part to Leach's active hands and the frequent presence of Hone's woodwinds, the material evokes gentle spiritual and Brazilian jazz almost as much as it does smooth private-press soul". Andrew Male of Mojo found the album "both a bigger sounding LP than Pleasure, Joy And Happiness but also a deeper one". Jamie Atkins of Record Collector wrote: "there's a new sense of confidence in the vocals, the clarity of the melodies, and production flourishes. Lyrically, too, there's a shift – the troubled soul-searching has (mostly) given way to a sense of joy and acceptance at his place in the world. There are songs here that do not so much start as saunter into earshot, in no rush to reveal themselves and all the more seductive for it". Uncut reviewer called the album "a blissful affair". Margeaux Labat of Pitchfork named it "a collection of laid-back grooves and sultry meditations on love, loss, and the human experience".

== Track listing ==
Sundown track listing
No.	Title	Length
1.	"Step by Step"	3:10
2.	"Far Away"	5:10
3.	"Comes and Goes"	4:06
4.	"Sundown"	4:48
5.	"Holy Hell"	3:12
6.	"Haunted Memories"	5:55
7.	"Same Old Song"	3:34
8.	"The Morning Sun"	4:43
Total length:		34:38

== Personnel ==
- Eddie Chacon – vocals
- John Carroll Kirby – keyboards, producer, recording
- Logan Hone – flute, alto saxophone
- Elizabeth Lea – trombone
- William Logan – drums
- David Leach – percussion
- Pierre de Reeder – recording
- Tony Buchen – mixing
- Jack McKain – photography
- Justin Sloane – art direction, typography

== Charts ==
Chart performance for Sundown
Chart (2023)	Peak position
Scottish Albums (OCC)	98
UK Album Downloads (OCC)	47
UK Independent Albums (OCC)	19
