= True Romance (soundtrack) =

1993 soundtrack album

True Romance (Original Motion Picture Soundtrack)

Film score by Hans Zimmer
- Released: September 7, 1993
- Genre: Rock
- Length: 46:58
- Label: Morgan Creek
- Producer: Hans Zimmer

Hans Zimmer film soundtracks chronology
Calendar Girl (1993)	True Romance (Original Motion Picture Soundtrack) (1993)	Cool Runnings (1993)

Professional ratings
Review scores
Source	Rating
AllMusic	3/5 stars

True Romance (Original Motion Picture Soundtrack) is a soundtrack by Hans Zimmer for Tony Scott's film of the same name. It was released on September 7, 1993 through Morgan Creek Productions.

== Development ==
The score for Tony Scott's True Romance (1993) was composed by Hans Zimmer, which is a theme based on Gassenhauer nach Hans Neusiedler (1536) by Gunild Keetman, published in 1952 in Musik für Kinder by Schulwerk. This theme, combined with a voiceover spoken by the film's lead actress Patricia Arquette, is an homage to Terrence Malick's crime film Badlands (1973), in which Sissy Spacek speaks the voiceover, and that also shares similar dramatic motifs.

== Track listing ==
No.	Title	Contributing artist	Length
1.	"You're So Cool"	Hans Zimmer	3:40
2.	"Graceland"	Charlie Sexton	3:26
3.	"In Dreams"	John Waite	3:45
4.	"Wounded Bird"	Charles & Eddie	5:11
5.	"I Want Your Body"	Nymphomania	4:18
6.	"Stars at Dawn"	Hans Zimmer	2:04
7.	"I Need a Heart to Come Home To"	Shelby Lynne	4:21
8.	"Viens Mallika Sous Le Dome Edais from Lakmé"	Léo Delibes	3:57
9.	"(Love Is) The Tender Trap"	Robert Palmer	2:37
10.	"Outshined"	Soundgarden	5:12
11.	"Amid the Chaos of the Day"	Hans Zimmer	4:54
12.	"Two Hearts"	Chris Isaak	3:33

== Legacy ==
"Robbers", a song by the English indie rock band The 1975 from their 2013 debut album, was inspired by the film. Vocalist Matthew Healy explained: "I got really obsessed with the idea behind Patricia Arquette's character in True Romance when I was about eighteen. That craving for the bad boy in that film [is] so sexualized." True Romance, the 2013 debut album from English pop star Charli XCX, was named after the film. In the trance song "Solarcoaster" by Solarstone, a sample is used from the film. The sample includes the line spoken by Alabama, "That three words went through my mind endlessly. Repeating themselves like a broken record. You're so cool. You're so cool. You're so cool."

== Reception ==
Janet Maslin of The New York Times wrote, "The score varies from Burl Ives to Aerosmith, with theme music by Hans Zimmer that has the jingling sound of a Christmas carol, yet all the music feels exactly right. The soundtrack underscores the sense that this film is a fable, albeit a movie-mad fairy tale with a body count for modern times."
