= Pixel Bath =

Studio album by Jean Dawson
- Released: October 23, 2020
- Genre: Alternative hip hop; dream pop
- Length: 38:58
- Label: P+
- Producer: Hoskins; 23rd; Tickle Torture; Psymun; Lecx Stacy; Jim-E Stack; Nick León; Blake Slatkin; Gabe Wax

Jean Dawson chronology
Bad Sports (2019)	Pixel Bath (2020)	Chaos Now (2022)

Singles from Pixel Bath
- 1. "Bruise Boy" Released: February 12, 2020; 2. "Power Freaks" Released: April 14, 2020; 3. "Policía" Released: June 9, 2020; 4. "Clear Bones" Released: June 25, 2020; 5. "Starface" Released: September 23, 2020; 6. "Devilish" Released: October 23, 2020

Pixel Bath is the debut (Note: Dawson's 2019 release Bad Sports has been variously referred to as an album, an EP, and a mixtape. If Bad Sports was considered Dawson's debut album, Pixel Bath would be his second.) studio album by Mexican-American experimental pop musician Jean Dawson, released on October 23, 2020, by the artist's independent label P+.

== Style and reception ==
Pixel Bath ratings
Review scores
Source	Rating
AllMusic	4/5 stars
Beats Per Minute	81%
NME	4/5 stars

AllMusic's Fred Thomas writes that on the album, Dawson "set out to create the 'soundtrack for a black coming-of-age film that never ends', and accomplishes just that with this collection of nostalgic dream pop melodies caught in perpetual conflicted collision with high-energy rap." The album includes opener "Devilish" which "moves abruptly from bellowed, melodramatic vocals to intense rap flows about monsters, boogie men, and surreal critiques of toxic masculinity" made even more unique by the placement of "his melodically sung lyrics ... over a backdrop of peppy guitars and bass that sounds like Clap Your Hands Say Yeah at their catchiest" and "album standout" "TripleDouble" [sic] "with a Pixies bass line decorated with trap ad-libs and a big rock chorus." Dawson's "wild swings of imagination and daring are so unexpected they can be jarring, but it's this willingness to go outside of the known that puts Pixel Bath in a class by itself."

The Arts Fuse's Alex Szeptycki calls the album "a kaleidoscopic melange that vividly reflects the artist's personality and inspirations" and "one of the most compelling releases I've heard this year", with Dawson's "magnetic personality ... infused through the album's excitingly varied instrumentals and bold vocal performances." Per Beats Per Minute's Kyle Kohner, Dawson's "refreshing and exciting" "undefinable alternative hip hop sound" brings "a bit of everything – bedroom pop, pop-punk, industrial rap, and even glitch-pop" to the album, making for a "boisterous marvel to behold, touched through and through with deep emotion." NME's Jenessa Williams says that "by refusing to limit his musical focus Dawson buys himself a future of authentic experimentation, thrilling the listener with unexpected twists and turns that do, miraculously, offer up something for everyone" and that while "if you really want to find fault in Pixel Bath, you might acknowledge that even the gnarliest of rollercoasters become that little bit less exciting once you've seen their blueprints", "if you're ready to hear what true unbounded creativity sounds like, Jean Dawson can take you on one hell of a ride."

== Track listing ==
All tracks are written by Jean Dawson, and all tracks but 7 and 8 written and produced by Zach Fogarty, with others noted. All tracks mixed by Gabe Wax.

Pixel Bath track listing
No.	Title	Writer(s)	Producer(s)	Length
1.	"Devilish"	George Flint; Henry Flint; Jonathan Hoskins	Hoskins; 23rd	3:22
2.	"Triple Double" (featuring ASAP Rocky)	Rakim Mayers		3:43
3.	"Shiner"			2:04
4.	"Dummy"	Elliott Kozel	Tickle Torture	2:57
5.	"Bruiseboy"			3:23
6.	"Pegasus"			2:23
7.	"Poster Child"	Kozel; Jesse Schuster; Simon Edward Christensen	Tickle Torture; Psymun	1:34
8.	"06 Burst"	Lecx Stacy	Stacy	2:45
9.	"Starface"	James Harmon Stack	Jim-E Stack	2:56
10.	"Policía"	Nick León	León	2:25
11.	"Clear Bones"	Blake Slatkin	Slatkin	2:47
12.	"Power Freaks"			4:12
13.	"Pyrotechnics"	Gabe Wax	Wax	4:27
Total length:				38:58

== Release history ==
Release dates and formats for Pixel Bath
Region	Date	Format(s)	Label	Ref.
Global	October 23, 2020	Music download, streaming	P+	
US	April 12, 2021	Vinyl	Handwritten Records	
