= Would I Lie to You? (Charles & Eddie song) =

1992 single by Charles & Eddie

Single by Charles & Eddie

from the album Duophonic
- Released: August 4, 1992
- Genre: Pop-soul; R&B
- Length: 4:40 (album version); 4:07 (video version); 3:41 (radio version)
- Label: Capitol
- Songwriters: Mike Leeson; Peter Vale
- Producer: Josh Deutsch

Charles & Eddie singles chronology
"Would I Lie to You?" (1992)	"NYC (Can You Believe This City?)" (1993)

Music video
- "Would I Lie to You?" on YouTube

"Would I Lie to You?" is a song by American soul music duo Charles & Eddie. Written by Mike Leeson and Peter Vale, and produced by Josh Deutsch, it was released in August 1992 by Capitol Records as the debut single from the duo's first album, Duophonic (1992). It proved to be an international success, topping the charts of six countries and entering the top five in nine others. In the United States, the single became a top-20 hit, peaking at number 11 on the Cash Box Top 100 and number 13 on the Billboard Hot 100. The song's accompanying music video featured the duo performing at various locations in New York City.

The songwriters, Leeson and Vale, received the 1992 Ivor Novello award for Best Song Musically and Lyrically. American singer and former teen idol Donny Osmond covered the song in 2002, while both John Gibbons and David Guetta released their covers in 2016.

== Critical reception ==
The song received favorable reviews from music critics. AllMusic editor Alex Henderson felt that Charles & Eddie "shows a great deal of promise on smooth pop-soul offerings" like "Would I Lie to You?", remarking that they "show their appreciation of classic soul in a very pop-friendly way". Larry Flick from Billboard magazine noted that the duo "is quickly picking up pop radio adds with this delightful twirl into retro-R&B territory. Rich lead vocals are supported by Motown-styled harmonies, rumbling Hammond organ fills, and an insinuating, live drum beat." Another Billboard editor complimented it as "outstanding". Randy Clark from Cash Box stated that "the two still manage to create a modern sound through production techniques and danceable beats". Tom Ewing of Freaky Trigger described it as "an irresistibly sweet record", adding, "It's dreaminess all the way down: if anyone’s going to end up hurt it'll be them, but that's an unimaginable outcome as long as the record's playing." Rufer & Fell from the Gavin Report commented, "What a hip single! Charles Pettigrew and Eddie Chacon incorporate a soulful sound reminiscent of R&B from years gone by, ala Sam and Dave etc. You only need one listen and we guarantee you'll push PLAY again. Would we lie to you!?"

Connie Johnson from Los Angeles Times wrote that "Would I Lie to You?" "is not to be missed, as solid, sleek and comfy a soulmobile as you're likely to encounter." In his weekly UK chart commentary, James Masterton named it a soul ballad "in the classic mould". Pan-European magazine Music & Media wrote that "one of soul afficionados' [sic] wildest dreams: a duet between Smokey Robinson and the late Marvin Gaye. With this single it's more than just wishful thinking." Neville Farmer from Music Week remarked that it "seemed like a one-off, a throw back to the classic soul style which stuck out like a sore thumb in the midst of the electronic techno filling the charts." Terry Staunton from NME named it "perhaps one of the most accomplished and enjoyable mainstream pop singles of the year, finely-tuned soul crooning in the tradition of Sam & Dave or James & Bobby Purify." A reviewer from People Magazine felt "it would be hard to get a better soul vibe and groove than the exquisite 'Would I Lie to You?'." Adam Higginbotham from Select complimented it as "a fantastic single" and "so faultlessly polished and timeless".

== Chart performance ==
"Would I Lie to You?" reached number one in Austria, Belgium, Germany, New Zealand, the United Kingdom, and Zimbabwe. In the UK, the song reached number one on November 15, 1992, after four weeks on the chart. It also reached number two in Denmark, France, Ireland, the Netherlands and Switzerland. In addition, the single was a top-10 hit in Australia, Italy, Norway, and Sweden. On the Eurochart Hot 100, "Would I Lie to You?" peaked at number two in January 1993. In the North America, it reached number 11 on the US Cash Box Top 100 and number 13 on the US Billboard Hot 100 while reaching number three in Canada. The song was awarded with a gold record in Austria and Germany, a silver record in France, and a platinum record in the Netherlands and the UK.

== Music video ==
The music video for "Would I Lie to You" sees Charles & Eddie performing the song at various locations in New York City. Occasionally, several different young women are seen walking around the city. Some scenes of the duo have a dark blue or sepia tone. And sometimes also features a fractured screen with two boxes, showing different images at the same time. As the video ends, Charles & Eddie continues to sing in the late hours as it gets dark outside. It received heavy rotation on MTV Europe in January 1993 and was later made available by Vevo on YouTube in 2009. It had generated almost 100 million views as of May 2025.

== Impact and legacy ==
NME ranked "Would I Lie to You?" number 23 on their list of "Singles of the Year" in December 1992. Its songwriters, Mick Leeson and Peter Vale, received the 1992 Ivor Novello award in the category for Best Song Musically and Lyrically. "Would I Lie to You?" was also awarded one of BMI's Pop Awards in 1994, honoring the songwriters, composers and music publishers of the song. In 2018, British house music DJ and producer Hot Since 82 (a.k.a. Daley Padley) ranked it among "The 10 Best Tracks to Open a Party", saying, "Gets me everytime, instant dancefloor moment and huge icebreaker for the shy ones!"

== Track listings ==
- 7-inch single
1. "Would I Lie to You?" (Radio Edit) – 3:41
2. "Would I Lie to You?" (Club House Mix) – 5:04
- CD single
1. "Would I Lie to You?" (Radio Edit) – 3:41
2. "Would I Lie to You?" (Club House Mix) – 5:04
- CD maxi single
1. "Would I Lie to You?" (Radio Edit) – 3:41
2. "Would I Lie to You?" (Club House Mix) – 5:04
3. "Would I Lie to You?" (Truth and Soul Mix) – 3:57
4. "Would I Lie to You?" (Funky Way Extended Mix) – 5:01

== Charts ==
=== Weekly charts ===
Chart (1992–1993)	Peak position
Australia (ARIA)	3
Austria (Ö3 Austria Top 40)	1
Belgium (Ultratop 50 Flanders)	1
Canada Top Singles (RPM)	3
Canada Adult Contemporary (RPM)	19
Denmark (IFPI)	2
Europe (Eurochart Hot 100)	2
Europe (European Dance Radio)	4
Europe (European Hit Radio)	2
France (SNEP)	2
Germany (GfK)	1
Iceland (Íslenski Listinn Topp 40)	14
Ireland (IRMA)	2
Italy (Musica e dischi)	10
Netherlands (Dutch Top 40)	2
Netherlands (Single Top 100)	2
New Zealand (Recorded Music NZ)	1
Norway (VG-lista)	3
Sweden (Sverigetopplistan)	3
Switzerland (Schweizer Hitparade)	2
UK Singles (Official Charts)	1
UK Airplay (Music Week)	1
UK Dance (Music Week)	11
US Billboard Hot 100	13
US Adult Contemporary (Billboard)	15
US Hot R&B Singles (Billboard)	59
US Top 40/Mainstream (Billboard)	6
US Top 40/Rhythm-Crossover (Billboard)	27
US Cash Box Top 100	11
Zimbabwe (ZIMA)	1

=== Year-end charts ===
Chart (1992)	Position
Australia (ARIA)	30
Brazil (Crowley)	80
Netherlands (Dutch Top 40)	98
New Zealand (RIANZ)	28
Sweden (Topplistan)	82
UK Singles (OCC)	3
UK Airplay (Music Week)	28
US Billboard Hot 100	90

Chart (1993)	Position
Australia (ARIA)	73
Austria (Ö3 Austria Top 40)	6
Belgium (Ultratop 50 Flanders)	26
Europe (Eurochart Hot 100)	10
Europe (European Hit Radio)	17
Germany (Media Control)	16
Iceland (Íslenski Listinn Topp 40)	57
Netherlands (Dutch Top 40)	41
Netherlands (Single Top 100)	11
New Zealand (RIANZ)	36
Sweden (Topplistan)	43
Switzerland (Schweizer Hitparade)	23

== Certifications ==
Region	Certification	Certified units/sales
Australia (ARIA)	Gold	35,000^{^}
Austria (IFPI Austria)	Gold	25,000^{*}
Denmark (IFPI Danmark)	Platinum	90,000^{‡}
France (SNEP)	Silver	125,000^{*}
Germany (BVMI)	Gold	250,000^{^}
Netherlands (NVPI)	Platinum	100,000^{^}
United Kingdom (BPI)	Platinum	600,000^{^}
^{*} Sales figures based on certification alone.^{^} Shipments figures based on certification alone.

== Release history ==
Region	Date	Format(s)	Label(s)	Ref.
United States	August 4, 1992	—N/a	Capitol	
Australia	October 5, 1992	CD; cassette	Capitol	
United Kingdom	October 19, 1992	7-inch vinyl; 12-inch vinyl; CD; cassette	Capitol	

== John Gibbons version ==
"Would I Lie to You"

Single by John Gibbons
- Released: August 12, 2016
- Genre: House
- Length: 3:20
- Label: Good Soldier
- Songwriters: Mick Leeson; Peter Vale
- Producers: John Gibbons; Colin Hanley

John Gibbons singles chronology
"Your Love" (2015)	"Would I Lie to You" (2016)	"P.Y.T. (Pretty Young Thing)" (2017)

Audio video
- "Would I Lie to You" on YouTube

Irish DJ and producer John Gibbons released a cover of the song, retitled "Would I Lie to You" (without the question mark). Gibbons co-produced the song with Colin Hanley, while Wez Clarke mixed the track with mastering from Nick Bennett. It was released for digital download on August 12, 2016.

=== Charts ===
Chart (2016)	Peak position
Ireland (IRMA)	34
Scottish Singles Sales (Official Charts)	46
UK Singles (Official Charts)	53

=== Certifications ===
Certifications for "Would I Lie to You?" John Gibbons version
Region	Certification	Certified units/sales
United Kingdom (BPI)	Silver	200,000^{‡}
^{‡} Sales+streaming figures based on certification alone.

== David Guetta, Cedric Gervais and Chris Willis version ==
"Would I Lie to You"

Single by David Guetta, Cedric Gervais and Chris Willis
- Released: September 30, 2016
- Genre: EDM; electro house; progressive house; deep house (Cash Cash remix)
- Length: 3:17
- Label: Jack Back; Parlophone; Warner
- Songwriters: Mick Leeson; Peter Vale
- Producers: David Guetta; Cedric Gervais; Junkx

David Guetta singles chronology
"All the Way Up (EDM remix)" (2016)	"Would I Lie to You" (2016)	"Shed a Light" (2016)

Cedric Gervais singles chronology
"Skin on Skin" (2016)	"Would I Lie to You" (2016)	"Somebody New" (2017)

Chris Willis singles chronology
"Don't Cry (Remember My Name)" (2015)	"Would I Lie to You" (2016)	"Turn Your Love Around" (2019)

French DJs David Guetta and Cedric Gervais, and American singer Chris Willis released a cover of "Would I Lie to You". It was released to digital download through Jack Back Records, Parlophone, and Warner Music Group on September 30, 2016.

=== Charts ===
==== Weekly charts ====
Chart (2016–2018)	Peak position
Argentina (Monitor Latino)	6
Austria (Ö3 Austria Top 40)	2
Belarus Airplay (Eurofest)	20
Belgium (Ultratop 50 Flanders)	34
Belgium (Ultratop 50 Wallonia)	23
Czech Republic (Rádio – Top 100)	3
Czech Republic Singles Digital (ČNS IFPI)	28
France (SNEP)	20
Germany (GfK)	2
Hungary (Dance Top 40)	4
Hungary (Rádiós Top 40)	4
Hungary (Single Top 40)	9
Israel International Airplay (Media Forest)	4
Italy (FIMI)	71
Italy (Musica e dischi)	39
Latvia (Latvijas Top 40)	8
Mexico Airplay (Billboard)	10
Poland Airplay (ZPAV)	9
Poland Dance (ZPAV)	1
Poland (Video Chart)	3
Russia Airplay (Tophit)	7
Slovakia Airplay (ČNS IFPI)	20
Slovakia Singles Digital (ČNS IFPI)	14
Slovenia (SloTop50)	3
Spain (Promusicae)	31
Sweden (Sverigetopplistan)	80
Switzerland (Schweizer Hitparade)	24
US Hot Dance/Electronic Songs (Billboard)	32

==== Year-end charts ====
Chart (2016)	Position
Austria (Ö3 Austria Top 40)	62
CIS (TopHit)	134
Germany (GfK)	53
Hungary (Dance Top 40)	41
Hungary (Single Top 40)	72
Russia Airplay (TopHit)	134
Ukraine Airplay (TopHit)	197

Chart (2017)	Position
Argentina Airplay (Monitor Latino)	36
CIS Airplay (TopHit)	32
Hungary (Dance Top 40)	12
Hungary (Rádiós Top 40)	11
Hungary (Single Top 40)	60
Latvia Airplay (LaIPA)	18
Poland Airlay (ZPAV)	47
Russia Airplay (TopHit)	25
Slovenia Airplay (SloTop50)	16
Ukraine Airplay (TopHit)	149

=== Certifications ===
Region	Certification	Certified units/sales
Austria (IFPI Austria)	Gold	15,000^{‡}
France (SNEP)	Gold	66,666^{‡}
Germany (BVMI)	Platinum	400,000^{‡}
Italy (FIMI)	Platinum	50,000^{‡}
Poland (ZPAV)	2× Platinum	100,000^{‡}
^{‡} Sales+streaming figures based on certification alone.

=== Release history ===
Country	Date	Format	Label	Ref.
Worldwide	September 30, 2016	Digital download	Jack Back; Parlophone; Warner	
Italy	September 30, 2016	Contemporary hit radio	Warner	
