= Jean Dawson =

Mexican-American experimental pop musician

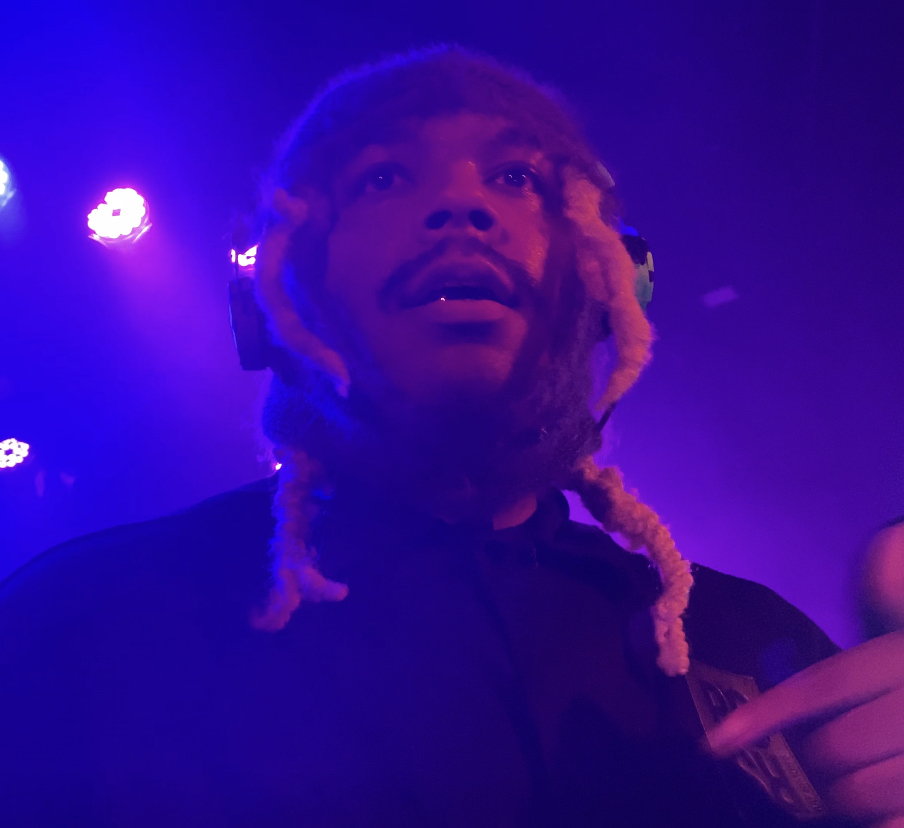
- Dawson in November 2022

Background information
- Born: David Sanders; December 22, 1995 (age 30); San Diego, California
- Origin: Los Angeles, California
- Genre: Experimental pop
- Occupation: Musician
- Instruments: Piano; guitar
- Years active: 2018–present
- Label: P+
- Website: jeandawsonofficial.com

David Sanders (born December 22, 1995), better known by the stage name Jean Dawson, is a Mexican-American musician. Since 2018, he has released five albums and over a dozen singles via his own record label P+. He is known for blending a wide variety of genres, ranging from pop, rock, hip-hop, and more, though his sound is most frequently summarized as experimental pop.

== Early life ==
Dawson was born David Sanders on December 22, 1995, in San Diego, California, and grew up in Tijuana, Mexico, (Note: It has been claimed that Dawson was born in Tijuana but he has called this a common misconception.) and Spring Valley, California. He is of mixed heritage, with an African-American father from Long Beach, California, and a Mexican mother from Sinaloa. His mother learned English by listening to West Coast hip hop. He would cross the border to San Diego every day since he went to elementary school there, requiring him to wake up at 3 a.m. He would spend those long bus rides listening to a wide variety of music, including grunge, hip hop, Britpop, new wave, and rock en español. In an interview with MTV's Patrick Hosken, Dawson described himself in school as having never been "the popular kid in school", instead "the kid in the library with one friend. And we'd sit, we'd talk every day about the internet and what we saw on the internet."

Dawson grew up in a musical family, with his parents' interest in each other's culture having been what connected them. This led him to deciding he wanted to make a career out of music at age 13. Growing up in poverty meant he couldn't afford his own instruments, so he would take the bus to a local Guitar Center every day after school and practice piano there.

== Career ==
=== 2019–2022 ===
After finishing high school, Dawson moved to Los Angeles to study film at California State University, Los Angeles. He would buy studio equipment with the money that he was given to buy books, which led to him dropping out to pursue a career in music. While still in college, he recorded Bad Sports in his dorm room with his roommate, Lecx Stacy. Essence interviewer Sydney Scott notes the project's influences as including "sonic and visual nods to Outkast, the Cure, Kid Cudi, and Kanye West with the singer-songwriter's taste later being informed by groups like Disturbed, N.E.R.D. and random CDs purchased from thrift stores." The album had a vinyl run, with Dawson later finding a collection of unsold vinyls which he autographed and listed for sale at US$1000, being met with criticism from fans for the high price.

On October 23, 2020, he released his second studio album, Pixel Bath via his independent record label P+.

On June 8, 2021, Dawson was announced as a support act for headliner Brockhampton's US and Europe tour that ran from August 2021 through June 2022. On June 16, Dawson released the Apple Music-exclusive single "Ghost", as part of the music streamer's Juneteenth-inspired Freedom Songs series. Dawson described the song as being "for the people who've felt unseen and unheard", and explained his personal perspective on the holiday, saying it "should never have needed to exist. My ancestors should have never been slaves and built a country that would show to be a curse to my Black skin. Nevertheless, I live in this version of reality where Black folk were and are seen as beasts, devils, and animals. So the day my beautiful Black ancestors were freed is the greatest cause for celebration and reflection." "Ghost" was released on all streaming platforms on February 17, 2023. The music video for Pixel Bath track "Dummy" was also released June 8, 2021, directed by Mowgly Lee and Bradley J. Calder.

In April 2022, Dawson performed at Coachella. On August 19, he announced his third studio album, Chaos Now, and released lead single "Three Heads". Chaos Now released October 7, via P+. Also on August 19, he announced his first headlining US tour for October and November, supported by LA-based duo Junior Varsity. The tour completely sold out, and left Dawson feeling "like I made thousands of friends in the span of a month." Reviews of the tour were positive, highlighting Dawson's stage presence and the audience's polite but high-energy moshing.

=== 2023–present ===
On February 22, 2023, Dawson was announced as part of the lineup for that year's edition of When We Were Young, set for October 21 and 22 in Las Vegas. The next month, Lollapalooza announced their 2023 lineup including Dawson, with the festival held in Chicago August 3–6.

On May 11, Dawson announced a new trilogy of singles, with the first released the same day. Those songs, "Youth+" and "Delusional World Champion", were collected as "Xcape Pt. 1", and feature Dawson assuming the character of Phoenix. Dawson also announced a headlining US tour for September and October. The second set of the trilogy, now called Destruction for Dummies, sees Dawson assuming the character of Nightmare on the songs "No Scope", "X-Ray", and "Vexed". He was also set to support Trippie Redd on select dates of his Take Me Away tour running from August through October before that tour was cancelled.

On September 17, Dawson announced a new single with SZA called "No Szns", which released on September 22. Dawson first teased the song via TikTok in May. The release came with cover art drawn by Josh Brizuela which was compared to art from the children's book Where the Wild Things Are. The song came with a music video directed by Dawson and Calder.

On January 31, 2024, Dawson was announced as one of the 16 artists covering a song from the Talking Heads album Stop Making Sense for the 40th anniversary tribute album Everyone's Getting Involved: A Tribute to Talking Heads' Stop Making Sense, set to be released by A24 Music on May 17. The tracklist was unveiled on April 24, Stop Making Sense's 40th anniversary, including that Dawson's contribution to the album would be a cover of the song "Swamp".

On March 6, Dawson released the single "New Age Crisis", one of three tracks from his EP Boohoo. The full EP was released the following day. One of the songs, "Divino Desmadre", is Dawson's first with lyrics entirely in Spanish. The EP was intended as an overture to an album planned for release later in the year.

On April 19, the film Abigail was released, featuring a new Dawson song called "Burn My Tongue" which plays over the end credits. The film's soundtrack album, featuring "Burn My Tongue" and the film's original score by Brian Tyler, was released the same day.

On August 16, 2024, Dawson announced his third studio album, Glimmer of God, released its lead single, a Lil Yachty-featuring song called "Die for Me", and announced a headlining US tour for October through December. The album was released on October 18.

On August 22, 2025, Dawson released "Rock a Bye Baby", the lead single to a forthcoming project called Rock a Bye Baby Glimmer of God. The song, reminiscent of 1980s pop music, was co-produced by Dawson's longtime collaborators Hoskins, Lecx Stacy, Johnny May, and Jesse Shuster.

On September 19, 2025, Dawson released "Blitz", a single for the soundtrack to the 2025 film Him.

=== Other ventures ===
In 2021, Dawson launched his clothing and merchandise label Turbo Radio, including collections of face masks, shirts, sweatpants, crew necks, and sweaters that he designed.

On February 25, 2021, Dawson released a seven minute documentary short about himself titled Burnout, which he directed himself. The film, featuring "Blade Runner-esque" visual effects and a music score by frequent collaborator Zach Fogarty, sees him discussing his personal life in an intimate, vulnerable way. Topics include his past, being "anti", and getting happier as he gets older.

== Style ==
In an interview with DIY's Elly Watson, Dawson listed his influences as including Kanye West; The Smashing Pumpkins; "Warped Tour shit"; "anything from Manchester" such as the Smiths; New Order; and "all the stuff that felt really Britpop-py", noting that when working on Bad Sports single "Napster" he asked his British producers Hoskins to make the song "feel like Manchester and Compton had a baby", "like if Morrissey was Black." Dawson described his intent for Pixel Bath to sound like "Rick Ross at a '90s rave" or "the Pixies, but the Pixies are at the most trapped-out environment that the Pixies can be at."

Dawson has been described as a "genre-shattering polymath" with an "ability to blend [genres which] comes more naturally than most", having employed a long list of sounds including early 2000s indie rock, trap, R&B, bedroom pop, pop-punk, industrial hip hop, glitch-pop, grunge, shoegaze, alternative rock, hardcore hip hop, underground hip hop, emo, country, and classical. Dawson is also commonly referred to as simply an experimental pop artist. Dawson describes his approach by saying "When people ask me what genre I make, I'm like, dude, I don't know" and "What genre of music did Prince make? I'm not comparing myself to Prince—he is a god among humans. But his music was just Prince. It was everything you needed it to be at the time."

Dawson's lyrics cover topics including anxiety, depression, feeling like an outsider, fragile masculinity, drug addiction, gang life, spirituality, and morality.

== Personal life ==
Dawson has three dogs: a Dobermann named Midnight, a French Bulldog named Mala, and an English Bulldog named Oz. He lives in Inglewood, California.

Dawson has struggled with depression, including a period of persistent suicidal ideation when he was 21 which led him to start therapy and taking SSRIs.

== Discography ==
=== Albums ===
- Bad Sports (2019) (Note: Dawson's 2019 release Bad Sports has been variously referred to as an album, an EP, and a mixtape.)
- Pixel Bath (2020)
- Chaos Now (2022)
- Glimmer of God (2024)
- Rock a Bye Baby, Glimmer of God (2025)

=== EPs ===
- Boohoo (2024)

=== Singles ===
List of singles, showing year released, selected chart positions, and album name
Title	Year	Peak chart positions			Album
Title	Year	US Alt.	US AAA	NZ Hot	Album
"Glacier Gallery"	2018	—	—	—	Non-album single
"Bullfighter"	2018	—	—	—	Bad Sports
"Napster"	2019	—	—	—	Bad Sports
"Blame by Me"	2019	—	—	—	Bad Sports
"Ooga Booga"	2019	—	—	—	Non-album single
"Bruise Boy"	2020	—	—	—	Pixel Bath
"Power Freaks"	2020	—	—	—	Pixel Bath
"Policía"	2020	—	—	—	Pixel Bath
"Clear Bones"	2020	—	—	—	Pixel Bath
"Starface"	2020	—	—	—	Pixel Bath
"Devilish"	2020	—	—	—	Pixel Bath
"Ghost"	2021	—	—	—	Non-album singles
"Menthol" (featuring Mac DeMarco)	2021	—	—	—	Non-album singles
"Porn Acting"	2022	—	—	—	Chaos Now
"Three Heads"	2022	—	—	—	Chaos Now
"Pirate Radio"	2022	—	11	—	Chaos Now
"Sick of It"	2022	29	—	—	Chaos Now
"Bad Fruit"	2022	—	—	—	Chaos Now
"'Xcape', pt. 1 Jean Dawson as 'Phoenix'"	2023	—	—	—	Non-album singles
"Spotify Singles"	2023	—	—	—	Non-album singles
"'Destruction for Dummies', pt. 2 Jean Dawson as 'Nightmare'"	2023	—	—	—	Non-album singles
"No Szns" (with SZA)	2023	—	—	18	Non-album singles
"New Age Crisis"	2024	—	—	—	Boohoo
"Fit Check Freestyle" (with 1999 Write the Future)	2024	—	—	—	Non-album single
"Die for Me" (featuring Lil Yachty)	2024	—	—	—	Glimmer of God
"Houston"	2024	—	—	—	Glimmer of God
"P4in" (featuring Bones)	2024	—	—	—	Glimmer of God
"Rock a Bye Baby"	2025	—	34	—	Rock a Bye Baby Glimmer of God
"Blitz"	2025	—	—	—	Him (Original Motion Picture Soundtrack)
"White Lighter"	2025	—	—	—	Rock a Bye Baby Glimmer of God
