= Let the Sun Talk =

2019 studio album by Mavi

Studio album by Mavi
- Released: October 18, 2019
- Genre: Abstract hip-hop
- Length: 32:11
- Producers: Tairiq; Duckie; Ntvrme; Dkarim; Murky waters; Nephew Hesh; NATE; Nova Blu; randomblackdude; Ovrkast.; Jippy; dj blackpower

Mavi chronology
No Roses (2017)	Let the Sun Talk (2019)	End of the Earth (2021)

Let the Sun Talk is the debut studio album by the American rapper Mavi, released independently on October 18, 2019. A concept album inspiring social change, it features production by Earl Sweatshirt and Mike, under aliases.

== Background and recording ==
Mavi released two mixtapes before Let the Sun Talk, Beacon in 2016 and No Roses in 2017. He was compared to Earl Sweatshirt and Mike and was co-signed with them.

== Production and composition ==
=== Overview ===
The album is primarily an abstract hip-hop album, similar to work of artists like Mike, Pink Siifu, and Earl Sweatshirt. It is a concept album, inspired by What's Going On by Marvin Gaye, in which Mavi puts more emphasis on the meaning of the lyrics rather than the show and display of them. He was inspired heavily by the writing of Toni Morrison. Many of the lyrics inspire social change. The album's title references the beliefs of the Five-Percent Nation and Rastafari.

== Critical reception ==
Professional ratings
Review scores
Source	Rating
Pitchfork	7.8/10

Sheldon Pearce of Pitchfork rated the album a 7.8/10, highlighting the messages of the album but also noting that it lacks clarity and directness at times.

== Track listing ==
Let the Sun Talk track listing
No.	Title	Writer(s)	Producer(s)	Length
1.	"Terms & Conditions"	Omavi Minder; Tairiq Bright	Tairiq	1:52
2.	"Eye/I and I/Nation"	Minder; Duckie; Ntvrme; Dkarim	Duckie; Ntvrme; Dkarim	4:15
3.	"Daylight Savings" (featuring Synclair)	Minder; Synclair	Murky waters	1:20
4.	"Self Love"	Minder; Nephew Hesh	Nephew Hesh	5:07
5.	"II"	Minder; Bright	Tairiq	1:21
6.	"Ghost (In the Shell)"	Minder; Dkarim	Dkarim	1:53
7.	"Love, of Money"	Minder; Nathan Suarez; Nova Blu	NATE; Nova Blu	1:04
8.	"Sense"	Minder; Thebe Kgositsile	randomblackdude	1:06
9.	"III"	Minder; Nova Blu	Nova Blu	1:54
10.	"Chiasma"	Minder; Silas Wilson	Ovrkast.	3:06
11.	"Guernica"	Minder; Nephew Hesh	Nephew Hesh	2:03
12.	"Omavi"	Minder; Jippy	Jippy	2:46
13.	"Moonfire"	Minder; Michael Bonema	dj blackpower	4:19
Total length:				32:11
