= Duophonic (album) =

Studio album by Charles & Eddie
- Released: August 31, 1992
- Recorded: May 1991–May 1992
- Studios: Sigma Sound Studios, Electric Lady Studios, RPM Studios, The Magic Shop, The Hit Factory and Sound On Sound (New York City, New York); Ocean Way Recording (Hollywood, California)
- Genre: R&B
- Length: 56:40
- Label: Capitol
- Producers: Andy Dean; Josh Deutsch; Ben Wolff

Charles & Eddie chronology
Duophonic (1992)	Chocolate Milk (1995)

Professional ratings
Review scores
Source	Rating
AllMusic	3/5 stars
Billboard	(favorable)
Robert Christgau	2/3 stars
Entertainment Weekly	A
Los Angeles Times	3/4 stars
NME	8/10
People	(favorable)
Select	2/5 medals

Duophonic is the debut album by American vocal duo Charles & Eddie, released in August 1992. The album has influences of "classic Northern soul of the '60s and '70s", and includes the worldwide smash hit "Would I Lie to You?" along with two further singles: "NYC (Can You Believe This City?)" and "House Is Not a Home".

== Critical reception ==
Amy Linden from Entertainment Weekly gave the album an A, writing, "By laying silky harmonies on top of gritty hip-hop beats, gospel organ fills, and languid guitars, Charles & Eddie’s Duophonic creates an R&B paradise." Terry Staunton from NME felt it "turns out to be a most assured debut split fairly neatly between upbeat funk and well-crafted ballads that manage to avoid the usual sentimentality." He concluded, "It's a fine testament to two young men who are set to become one of the most important soul discoveries of the decade."

== Track listing ==
No.	Title	Writer(s)	Length
1.	"House Is Not a Home"	Eddie Chacon; J. Freed	4:46
2.	"NYC (Can You Believe This City?)"	Chacon; Freed	5:45
3.	"Would I Lie to You?"	Mick Leeson; Peter Vale	4:38
4.	"Hurt No More"	Chacon; Freed	4:33
5.	"I Understand"	Charles Pettigrew	1:10
6.	"Unconditional"	Chacon; Andy Dean; Ben Wolff	4:40
7.	"Love Is a Beautiful Thing"	Seth Swirsky	4:45
8.	"Father to Son"	Chacon; Dean; Wolff	5:40
9.	"December 2"	Chacon	1:53
10.	"Be a Little Easy on Me"	Diane Warren	5:07
11.	"Vowel Song"	Chacon; Dean; Wolff	4:15
12.	"Where Do We Go from Here?"	Chacon	4:13
13.	"Shine" (includes untitled hidden track starting from 5:50)	Chacon; Freed; Rafael Hernandez	7:00

== Personnel ==
=== Musicians ===
- Charles Pettigrew – lead vocals (1–4, 6–8, 10–13), backing vocals (2–4, 6–8, 10–13), all vocals (5)
- Eddie Chacon – lead vocals (1–4, 6–8, 10–13), backing vocals (2–4, 7, 10–13), all vocals (9), percussion (13)
- Amp Fiddler – organ (1–4, 8, 12), acoustic piano (1, 3), Wurlitzer electric piano (1, 8), clavinet (2, 4, 12), Rhodes electric piano (2, 3, 5, 6)
- Garry Hughes – strings (1, 3, 7, 8, 12), loops (2), programming (2, 3, 8, 11), sampling (5), keyboard programming (5), percussion (7), clavinet (8), Rhodes electric piano (8, 11), keyboards (11)
- Josh Deutsch – loops (2), programming (2), guitars (12)
- Ed Tuton – loops (2), programming (2)
- Greg Smith – additional programming (3)
- Paul Gordon – keyboards (10), organ (10)
- Paul Griffin – organ (10, 13)
- Chris Bruce – guitars (1, 2, 10)
- Jean-Paul Bourelly – guitars (2, 9)
- David Fiuczynski – guitars (3, 4, 6–8, 11, 12)
- Jeff Anderson – bass (1–4, 6–8, 10, 12)
- Lonnie Hillyer – wah bass (4), guitars (13), bass (13)
- Yossi Fine – bass (11)
- Gene Lake – drums (1–4, 6–8, 11, 12)
- Carla Azar – drums (10)
- Daniel Sadownick – percussion (1–4, 6, 8, 10–12)
- Andy Snitzer – saxophones (5, 12)
- Michael Davis – trombone (5, 12)
- Kent Smith – trumpet (5, 12)
- Lani Groves – backing vocals (2, 11)
- Vaneese Thomas – backing vocals (2, 3, 11)
- Andrew Wyatt – backing vocals (2, 3, 11)
- Barry Carl – backing vocals (3)

=== Production ===
- Josh Deutsch – producer
- Andy Dean – additional track production (6, 8, 11)
- Ben Wolff – additional track production (6, 8, 11)
- Michael Christopher – basic track recording (1–9, 11–13)
- Ed Tuton – overdub recording, mixing (4, 5, 7, 9, 10, 11, 13), basic track recording (10)
- Femi Jiya – mixing (1–3, 6, 8, 12)
- Bradshaw Leigh – additional engineer
- Suzanne Dyer – basic track assistant (1–9, 11–13), overdub assistant
- Shannon Carr – basic track assistant (10)
- Phil Klum – overdub assistant
- Joe Warda – overdub assistant
- Howie Weinberg – mastering at Masterdisk (New York, NY)
- Artie Smith – production assistance, instrument technician and maintenance
- Janice Prendergast – project coordinator
- Wendy Dougan – art production (US release)
- Tommy Steele – art direction (US release)
- Stephen Walker – design (US release)
- Icon – art direction, design (UK release)
- Moshe Brakha – photography (US release)
- Richard Lohr – photography ((UK release)
- Cathy Casterine – styling
- Tony Smith and Paddy Sparks for Hit & Run America – management

== Samples ==
- "NYC (Can You Believe This City?)" samples "For What It's Worth" by Buffalo Springfield

== Charts ==
=== Weekly charts ===
Chart (1992–93)	Peak position
Australian Albums (ARIA)	83
Austrian Albums (Ö3 Austria)	4
Dutch Albums (Album Top 100)	9
Finnish Albums (Suomen virallinen lista)	22
French Albums (SNEP)	21
German Albums (Offizielle Top 100)	6
New Zealand Albums (RMNZ)	10
Norwegian Albums (VG-lista)	20
Swedish Albums (Sverigetopplistan)	26
Swiss Albums (Schweizer Hitparade)	5
UK Albums (Official Charts)	19
US Billboard 200	153

=== Year-end charts ===
Chart (1993)	Position
Austrian Albums (Ö3 Austria)	36
Dutch Albums (Album Top 100)	73
German Albums (Offizielle Top 100)	51
Swiss Albums (Schweizer Hitparade)	40
