= Watch This Liquid Pour Itself =

Studio album by Okay Kaya
- Released: January 24, 2020
- Length: 38:12
- Label: Jagjaguwar
- Producers: Okay Kaya; Christoph Andersson; John Kirby; Michael Seyer

Okay Kaya chronology
Both (2018)	Watch This Liquid Pour Itself (2020)

Professional ratings
Aggregate scores
Source	Rating
Metacritic	73/100
Review scores
Source	Rating
Exclaim!	7/10
The Guardian	3/5 stars
Paste	8.9/10
Pitchfork	6.8/10
Under the Radar	8/10

Watch This Liquid Pour Itself is the second studio album by Norwegian-American musician Okay Kaya. It was released on 24 January 2020 through Jagjaguwar.

The first single from the album, "Baby Little Tween" was released on November 12, 2019.

== Critical reception ==
Watch This Liquid Pour Itself was met with generally favorable reviews from critics. At Metacritic, which assigns a weighted average rating out of 100 to reviews from mainstream publications, this release received an average score of 73, based on 5 reviews.

== Track listing ==
All tracks are written by Kaya Wilkins, except where noted.

Watch This Liquid Pour Itself track listing
No.	Title	Writer(s)	Producer(s)	Length
1.	"Baby Little Tween"		Okay Kaya	2:13
2.	"Ascend and Try Again"	Kaya Wilkins; Christoph Andersson	Okay Kaya; Andersson	2:13
3.	"Insert Generic Name"		Okay Kaya	2:25
4.	"Overstimulated"		Okay Kaya	2:36
5.	"Psych Ward"	Wilkins; Andersson	Okay Kaya; Andersson	2:30
6.	"Guttural Sounds"		John Kirby	3:14
7.	"Asexual Wellbeing"		Okay Kaya	2:56
8.	"Popcorn Heart"	Wilkins; Andersson	Okay Kaya; Andersson	2:28
9.	"Mother Nature's Bitch"		Kirby	1:33
10.	"Hallelu Ya Hallelu Me"		Okay Kaya	2:46
11.	"Symbiosis"		Okay Kaya	3:29
12.	"Givenupitis"		Michael Seyer	2:29
13.	"Helsevesen"		Okay Kaya	2:52
14.	"Stonethrow"		Okay Kaya	2:38
15.	"Zero Interaction Ramen Bar"		Okay Kaya	1:50

== See also ==
- List of 2020 albums
