= Blowout (album) =

Studio album by John Carroll Kirby
- Released: June 30, 2023
- Studio: 64 Sound (Los Angeles, California)
- Length: 56:36
- Label: Stones Throw
- Producer: John Carroll Kirby

John Carroll Kirby chronology
Dance Ancestral (2022)	Blowout (2023)

Blowout is the eighth solo album by American keyboardist and record producer John Carroll Kirby, released on June 30, 2023, through Stones Throw Records. It was preceded by the lead single "Oropendola" and inspired by Kirby's time in Puerto Viejo, Costa Rica, where he began writing the album.

== Background and recording ==
Kirby began writing the album after making a trip to Puerto Viejo, Costa Rica for his travelogue series Kirby's Gold, naming the lead single "Oropendola" after the oropendola bird. He then finished recording the album at Stones Throw Studio in Los Angeles "with a stripped-down band".

== Critical reception ==
Professional ratings
Aggregate scores
Source	Rating
Metacritic	84/100
Review scores
Source	Rating
AllMusic	4/5 stars
Clash	8/10
Pitchfork	7.1/10

Blowout received a score of 84 out of 100 on review aggregator Metacritic based on four critics' reviews, indicating "universal acclaim". Thom Jurek of AllMusic described Blowout as "easily the most exotic-sounding album in Kirby's catalog" along with "Kirby's most adventurous record as well as his most accessible, thanks to hip arrangements, imaginative compositions, and focused, expert musicianship". Nick Roseblade of Clash called it "perhaps [Kirby's] best album yet" as "he just unloads melody, after melody, after melody". Roseblade remarked that Blowout "isn't a calypso album, but it also is calypso. If calypso had subtle electronic glitches, beats and blips as well as flutes and steel drums", and "what Blowout does really well is transport you to a version of Costa Rica that doesn't really exist [...] What more do you want from John Carroll Kirby?" Uncut described the album as "entirely irresistible" and Mojo called it "a left-field jazz date transversing elation and sadness". Brady Brickner-Wood of Pitchfork concluded that the album "signals a compositional maturation: He's tightening his skills and daring to experiment while also making more accessible, pleasure-packed pieces", finding it to be "sprinkled with moments that jolt you to attention as surely as they soothe".

== Track listing ==
All tracks are written by John Carroll Kirby.

Blowout track listing
No.	Title	Length
1.	"Oropendola"	4:15
2.	"Mates"	4:57
3.	"The Takedown"	3:34
4.	"Hotel Jonny Chingas"	5:41
5.	"Vertigo"	3:51
6.	"So So So"	4:32
7.	"Sun Go Down"	3:12
8.	"Gecko Sound"	7:17
9.	"Flying Cat"	4:43
10.	"Mates" (dub)	4:58
11.	"So So So" (dub)	4:33
12.	"Hotel Jonny Chingas" (dub)	5:03
Total length:		56:36
