= Okay Kaya =

American-Norwegian musician (born 1990)

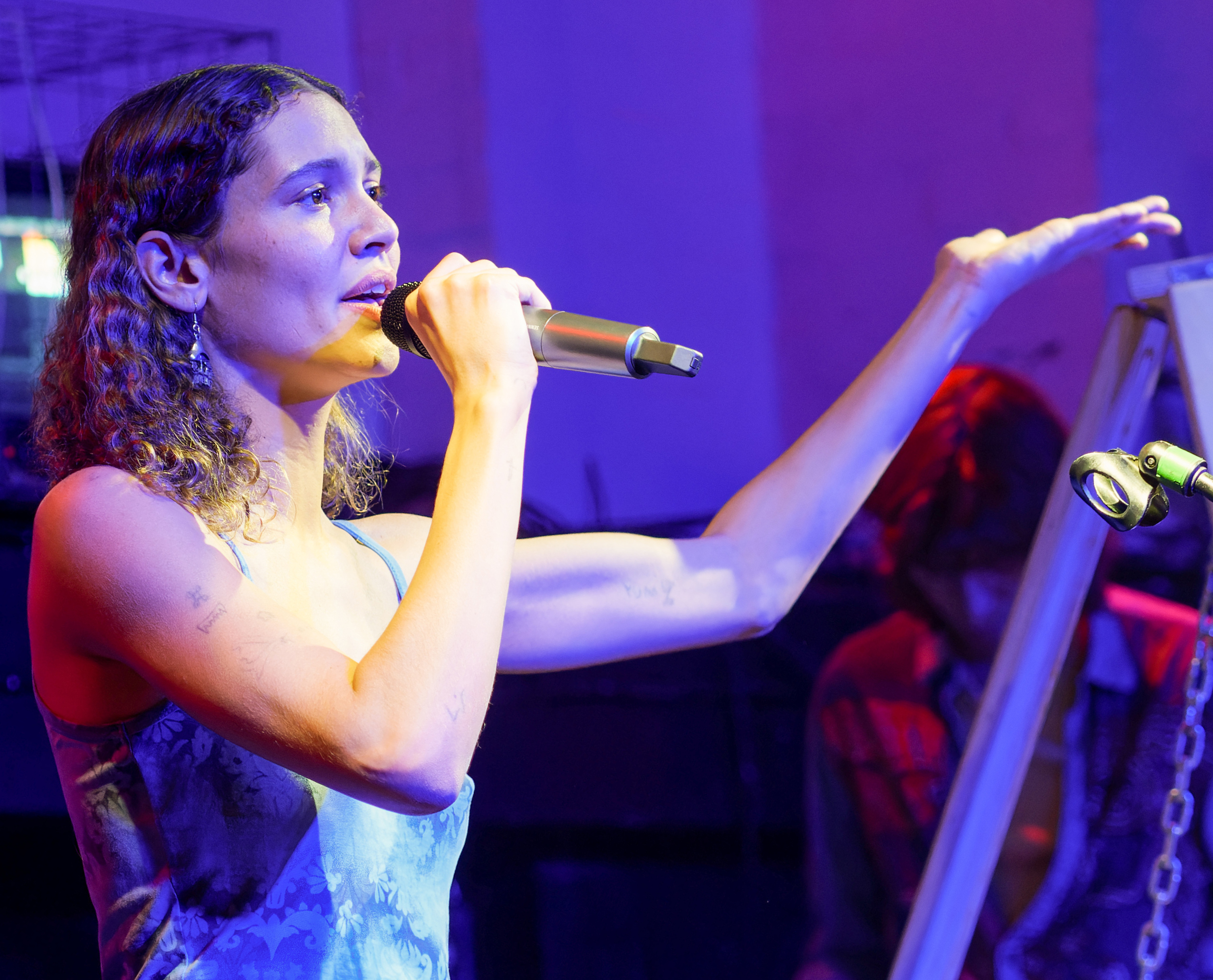
- Okay Kaya performing in November 2022
- Born: Kaya Wilkins; August 14, 1990 (age 36); New Jersey, U.S.
- Occupation: Singer
- Years active: 2015–present

Kaya Wilkins (born August 14, 1990), better known as Okay Kaya, is an American-Norwegian musician.

== Biography ==
Wilkins was born in New Jersey and raised in Nesoddtangen, four miles outside of Oslo. Raised by her mother along with five brothers, she has both Scandinavian and African-American roots.

Wilkins' first release under the moniker of Okay Kaya was the song "Damn, Gravity", which was released in 2015. Three years later, she released her first full-length album, Both. The album was recorded with her boyfriend Aaron Maine of the band Porches. In 2020, Wilkins released her second full-length album as Okay Kaya, titled Watch This Liquid Pour Itself, via Jagjaguwar. The album received three out of five stars from The Guardian. Her cover of Cher's Believe was featured in the HBO show Industry.

Wilkins acted her first role in the Norwegian drama Thelma. In August 2020, she released her mixtape Surviving is the New Living.

Wilkins has collaborated with the musical artist Baba Stiltz. In 2025 they released their collaborative album, Blurb. Her song "Nightswimming", which is a cover of R.E.M's single by the same name, is featured in the soundtrack to Jane Schoenbrun's film Teenage Sex and Death at Camp Miasma.

== Personal life ==
Wilkins is married to the British musician Oli Burslem. Together they form the alternative rock band, Beguiling Junior. After spending time living in the United States and Germany, Wilkins currently resides in Norway. In November 2026, Wilkins announced that she is expecting her first child.

== Discography ==
=== Studio albums ===
Title	Details
Both	Released: 1 June 2018; Label: Heavy Body Records, Su Tissue; Formats: Digital download, streaming, LP
Watch This Liquid Pour Itself	Released: 24 January 2020; Label: Jagjaguwar; Formats: CD, LP, digital download, streaming
SAP	Released: 4 November 2022; Label: Jagjaguwar; Formats: CD, LP, digital download, streaming, cassette
Oh My God - That’s So Me	Released: 6 September 2024; Label: OneRPM

=== Mixtapes ===
Title	Details
Mix Vol. One	Released: 28 October 2014; Label: Self-released; Formats: streaming
Surviving Is the New Living	Released: 14 August 2020; Label: Jagjaguwar; Formats: Digital download, streaming, cassette
The Incompatible Okay Kaya	Released: 22 October 2021; Label: Jagjaguwar

=== Singles ===
==== As lead artist ====
List of singles, showing year released and album name
Title	Year	Album
"Damn Gravity"	2015	Non-album singles
"Clenched Teeth"	2015	Non-album singles
"I'm Stupid (But I Love You)"	2015	Non-album singles
"Durer"	2016	Non-album singles
"Keep On Pushin'"	2016	Non-album singles
"IUD"	2018	Both
"Dance Like You"	2018	Both
"Believe"	2019	Non-album single
"Ascend and Try Again"	2019	Watch This Liquid Pour Itself
"Baby Little Tween"	2019	Watch This Liquid Pour Itself
"Asexual Wellbeing"	2019	Watch This Liquid Pour Itself
"Psych Ward"	2020	Watch This Liquid Pour Itself
"You're Still the One"	2020	Non-album single

==== As featured artist ====
List of singles, showing year released and album name
Title	Year	Album
"Falling" (Vera featuring Okay Kaya)	2017	Good Job No Conversation
"Almost Nothing" (Silent Poets featuring Okay Kaya)	2019	Death Stranding (Songs from the Video Game)
"Getting to Know You" (Onyx Collective featuring Okay Kaya & Julian Soto)	2020	Manhattan Special
"Jonas Said" (Aerial East featuring Okay Kaya)	2021	Try Harder
"Wife Wife" (Deem Spencer featuring Okay Kaya)	2021	Wife Wife
"Win Some" (LEYA featuring Okay Kaya)	2022	Eyeline

==== Promotional singles ====
List of singles, showing year released and album name
Title	Year	Album
"Vampire"	2018	Both
"Habitual Love"	2018	Both

=== Guest appearances ===
Title	Year	Other artists	Album
"Slush Puppy"	2017	King Krule	The Ooz
"Åkeren"	2018	Porches	The House
"Getting to Know You"	2020	Onyx Collective, Julian Soto	Manhattan Special
"One Last Time"	2020	Hess Is More	Suicide Tourist (Original Score)
"Nightswimming"	2021	—N/a	Join the Ritual

== Filmography ==
Year	Title	Role	Notes
2017	Thelma	Anja	Credited as Kaya Wilkins
2019	Exit Plan	Mia	Credited as Kaya Wilkins
