= Septet (John Carroll Kirby album) =

Studio album by John Carroll Kirby
- Released: June 25, 2021
- Studio: 64 Sound (Highland Park, Los Angeles, California)
- Genre: Jazz-funk
- Length: 46:33
- Label: Stones Throw
- Producer: John Carroll Kirby; Tony Buchen (add.)

John Carroll Kirby chronology
My Garden (2020)	Septet (2021)	Cryptozoo: Original Motion Picture Soundtrack (2021)

Septet is the sixth solo studio album by American keyboardist and record producer John Carroll Kirby. It was released on June 25, 2021, via Stones Throw Records, making it the artist's third album for the label. Recording sessions took place at 64 Sound in Highland Park, Los Angeles. Production was handled by Kirby himself, with additional production from Tony Buchen, who also provided mixing duties on the album. It features contributions from J. P. Maramba on bass, Deantoni Parks on drums, David Leach on percussion, Logan Hone and Tracy Wannomae on woodwind, and Nick Mancini on mallets.

Music videos for "Rainmaker" and "P64 by My Side" were directed by Michael Hili.

== Critical reception ==
Professional ratings
Aggregate scores
Source	Rating
Metacritic	87/100
Review scores
Source	Rating
AllMusic	4.5/5 stars
Clash	8/10
Loud and Quiet	5/10
Mojo	4/5 stars
Record Collector	4/5 stars
The Wire	4/5

Septet was met with generally favorable reviews from music critics. At Metacritic, which assigns a normalized rating out of 100 to reviews from mainstream publications, the album received an average score of 87, based on four reviews, which indicates "universal acclaim".

AllMusic's Andy Kellman wrote: "remarkably, the most effective moments in this vein occur when the leader assumes a background position, lending synthesizer shading and warped effects as mallets and flute link and skip at the fore of "P64 by My Side". For the most part, this is a jazz date—an inviting and beatific one that frequently evokes classic '70s jazz-funk". Nick Roseblade of Clash wrote: "what Septet really does well is show how accomplished Kirby has become in his writing. The music is fun, with a joyous bounce, but also hints at a deep melancholy. It's not sad, but it's also not happy". Andy Cowan of Mojo called it "an expansive, summery jazz-funk crossover that lives and dies on its monster grooves". Charles Waring of Record Collector saw it "uniformly engaging and cohesive". The Wire reviewer found it "beautifully appointed make-out music, redolent of Adrian Younge, Miles Davis's 1980s re-emergence and late 70s pre-electro Herbie Hancock". Sam Walton of Loud and Quiet wrote: "Septet is just too innocuous to be anything more than extraordinarily high-end lift music or hi-fi demonstration fodder, faultless and danger free, the kind of music so dynamic-less that you forget is playing after a while, that startles you only when it stops, as if the natural order of things should have it on loop forever more".

== Track listing ==
All tracks are written by John Carroll Kirby.

Septet track listing
No.	Title	Length
1.	"Rainmaker"	7:42
2.	"P64 by My Side"	4:11
3.	"Sensing Not Seeing"	5:33
4.	"Swallow Tail"	3:48
5.	"Weep"	4:49
6.	"Jubilee Horns"	7:00
7.	"The Quest of Chico Hamilton"	4:28
8.	"Nucleo"	9:02
Total length:		46:33

CD and vinyl edition additional tracks
No.	Title	Length
9.	"Sensing Dub"
10.	"Jubilee Dub"
11.	"Nucleo Dub"

== Personnel ==
- John Carroll Kirby – songwriter, keyboards, producer
- John Paul Maramba – bass
- Deantoni Parks – drums
- David Leach – percussion
- Logan Hone – woodwind
- Tracy Wannomae – woodwind
- Nick Mancini – mallets
- Tony Buchen – additional producer, mixing
- Jake Viator – mastering
- Eddie Chacon – photography
- Justin Sloane – design
