= John Carroll Kirby =

American musician

- Kirby performing in 2026

Background information
- Born: February 26, 1983 (age 43); Los Angeles, California, U.S.
- Genres: Jazz; R&B; hip-hop; funk; new-age; soul
- Occupations: Pianist; composer; record producer
- Instrument: Keyboards
- Years active: 2014–present
- Labels: Stones Throw; Leaving; Outside Insight; Patience
- Website: johncarrollkirby.com

John Carroll Kirby (born February 26, 1983) is an American composer based in Los Angeles, California, United States. As a musician, Kirby has collaborated with artists including Remi Wolf, Solange, Frank Ocean, Miley Cyrus, Norah Jones, Bat for Lashes, Connan Mockasin, Sébastien Tellier, Harry Styles, and others.

== Career ==
=== 2007–2017: Early years, collaborations, Grammy Awards ===
Growing up in California, Kirby was encouraged by his mom to take piano lessons, which led to a lengthy immersion in jazz. He studied jazz orchestration and composing with John Clayton at the University of Southern California before touring with other artists and making a name for himself as a collaborator. In 2007, Kirby contributed to will.i.am's Songs About Girls, Jully Black's Revival, and Raya Yarbrough's self-titled LP before going on to work on albums by Mike Doughty, Norah Jones, David Holmes, and Madeleine Peyroux. In the same year, Kirby was credited with electric piano on a few tracks for Sébastien Tellier and went on to co-arrange and co-produce Sébastien Betbeder's Marie et les Naufragés.

In 2015, Kirby partnered with Cara Stricker under the alias Drool for a self-titled album of moody avant-pop released by Terrible Records. Shortly after, Kirby was on keys for Blood Orange's Freetown Sound and co-produced three tracks on Solange's Billboard 200-topping A Seat at the Table, where he also played synths on Cranes in the Sky, the track which earned Solange her first Grammy for Best R&B Performance at the 59th Grammy Awards in 2016. After collaborations with INGA, Sébastien Tellier, Midnight Juggernauts' Daniel Stricker and Shabazz Palaces, Kirby issued his first solo album, Travel, on OUTSIDE INSIGHT and Meditations in Music on Leaving Records in 2017. He was also extensively involved in Boys Like Girls' Martin Johnson's side project The Night Game's self-titled album that year.

=== 2019–present: Collaborations, studio albums ===
In 2019, Kirby was featured on Solange's When I Get Home, Bat for Lashes' Lost Girls, Mark Ronson's Late Night Feelings, as well as Frank Ocean's DHL and Harry Styles' Canyon Moon. In the same year, he signed to Stones Throw Records and issued Lazzara before releasing Tuscany, on Patience. The following year, Kirby played on The Avalanches' Blood Orange collaboration We Will Always Love You before releasing Conflict, an ambient album created in response to the COVID-19 pandemic, on Stones Throw. Shortly after, he debuted his full-length album, My Garden, on the label. Pitchfork described Kirby as a musician who "crafts melodies with a neat geometric precision".

In April 2021, Kirby announced his second studio album for Stones Throw Records, Septet. An electronic jazz album, Septet was made with a live seven-piece band and was released on June 2, 2021. The music video for the album's first single, Rainmaker, features musicians from Kirby's ensemble, along with special guests Mac DeMarco, Eddie Chacon, Cola Boyy and comedian Kerwin Frost. Kirby also wrote and produced the original soundtrack to the animated film Cryptozoo, which won the Innovator Award at the 2021 Sundance Film Festival. The original soundtrack was released separately by Stones Throw Records in August 2021. That same year, My Garden was nominated for Best Jazz Album for the 2021 A2IM Libera Awards. He also worked closely with American singer-songwriter Kacy Hill for her album, Simple, Sweet, and Smiling, which Paper said drew "on the magnetic ambiance of Kirby's music".

In March 2022, Kirby announced his album Dance Ancestral with the first single Dawn of New Day featuring ambient pioneer Laraaji. The track was included in Uncut's "The 2nd Uncut New Music Playlist Of 2022". Dance Ancestral was made in collaboration with Canadian artist Yu Su and was released on Stones Throw Records on April 8, 2022.

== Discography ==
=== Albums ===
List of albums
Title	Year
Travel	2017
Meditations in Music	2018
Tuscany	2019
Conflict	2020
My Garden	2020
Septet	2021
Dance Ancestral	2022
Blowout	2023

=== Singles ===
List of singles
Title	Year
"Lazzara"	2019
"Blueberry Beads"	2020
"By the Sea"	2020
"Wind"	2020
"High"	2020
"Blueberry Beads" (live at Blue Whale Club)	2020
"Rainmaker"	2021
"Sensing Not Seeing"	2021
"Phoebe's Theme"	2021
"Tenderfoot Pegasus"	2021
"I Consult You Before Everything" (Amazon original)	2021
"Dawn of New Day" (featuring Laraaji)	2022

=== Collaborations ===
List of collaborations
Lead artist	Release	Label	Year	Credits		
				Keyboards	Production	Composition
Sébastien Tellier	L'aventura	Record Makers	2014	Yes		
Cara Stricker x John Carroll Kirby	Drool	Terrible Records	2015	Yes	Yes	Yes
Blood Orange	Freetown Sound	Domino Recording Co Ltd.	2016	Yes		
Solange	A Seat at the Table	Columbia	2016	Yes	Yes	Yes
Shabazz Palaces	Quazars	Sub Pop	2017	Yes		
INGA x John Carroll Kirby	The Shrek Orchid	Terrible Records	2017	Yes	Yes	Yes
Kirin J. Callinan	Bravado	Universal Music Australia	2017	Yes		Yes
Mind Gamers	Power of Power	Terrible Records	2017	Yes	Yes	Yes
Alex Cameron	Forced Witness	Secretly Canadian	2017	Yes		
Jonathan Wilson	Rare Birds	Bella Union	2018	Yes		
Dita Von Teese x Sébastien Tellier	Porcelaine	Record Makers	2018	Yes	Yes	Yes
Loren Kramar	Maybe	3H Artists	2018	Yes		Yes
Solange	Metatronia	Columbia Records	2018	Yes	Yes	Yes
Cola Boyy	Black Boogie Neon	Record Makers	2018	Yes		
Kali Uchis	Dead To Me (Acoustic)	Virgin EMI / Interscope	2018	Yes		
Connan Mockasin	Live	Mexican Summer LLC	2019	Yes		Yes
Solange	When I Get Home	Columbia	2019	Yes	Yes	Yes
Yellow Days	It's Real Love	Sony Music Entertainment UK	2019	Yes	Yes	Yes
Bat for Lashes	Lost Girls	Bat For Lashes, AWAL	2019	Yes		
Frank Ocean	DHL	Blonded	2019	Yes		
Harry Styles	Canyon Moon	Columbia Records	2019	Yes		
The Avalanches	We Will Always Love You	Modular	2020	Yes		
Sébastien Tellier	Domestic Tasks	Record Makers	2020	Yes		
Remi Wolf	Photo ID	Island Records	2020	Yes	Yes	Yes
Okay Kaya	Watch This Liquid Pour Itself	Jagjaguwar	2020		Yes	
Yellow Days	Treat You Right	Sony Music Entertainment UK	2020	Yes		Yes
Eddie Chacon	Pleasure Joy & Happiness	Day End Records	2020	Yes	Yes	Yes
Miley Cyrus	Never Be Me ft. Joan Jett	RCA Records	2020	Yes		Yes
Miley Cyrus	Bad Karma	RCA Records	2020	Yes		Yes
Kacy Hill	Simple, Sweet, and Smiling	Self-released	2021		Yes	Yes
Eddie Chacon	Sundown	Stones Throw Records	2023	Yes	Yes	
Kevin Abstract	Running Out	RCA Records	2023		Yes	Yes
Kevin Abstract	When the Rope Post 2 Break	RCA Records	2023		Yes	Yes
Kevin Abstract	The Greys	RCA Records	2023	Yes		Yes
