= Chocolate Milk (album) =

Studio album by Charles & Eddie
- Released: August 31, 1995
- Recorded: September 1994–May 1995
- Genre: R&B
- Length: 66:25
- Label: Capitol
- Producer: Josh Deutsch

Charles & Eddie chronology
Duophonic (1992)	Chocolate Milk (1995)

Professional ratings
Review scores
Source	Rating
AllMusic	3/5 stars
Robert Christgau	(choice cut)
Entertainment Weekly	B−
NME	7/10

Chocolate Milk is the second and final studio album by the American soul/R&B vocal duo Charles & Eddie. The title refers to the duo's mixed race; Charles Pettigrew who is black (chocolate) and Eddie Chacon who is hispanic (milk). The first single was "24-7-365".

The album produced two Top 40 hit singles: "24-7-365" (New Zealand, Switzerland and UK) and "Jealousy" (Austria).

The song "Little Piece of Heaven" was covered by the Neville Brothers on their 1999 LP, Valence Street.

== Critical reception ==
The Independent wrote: "There's little innovation in evidence here but Charles & Eddie's various takes on early Seventies soul modes are done with such obvious affection and care it's usually possible to hear beyond the influence to the emotion."

== Track listing ==
1. "Keep on Smilin'" (Jack Hall, Jimmy Hall, John Anthony, Lewis Ross, Richard Hirsch) – 5:11
2. "Jealousy" (Mike Leeson, Peter Vale) – 4:39
3. "24-7-365" (Gregg Sutton, John Herron) – 3:49
4. "Wounded Bird" (Charles Pettigrew, Eddie Chacon, Josh Deutsch) – 5:33
5. "Peace of Mind" (Aron Friedman, Charles Pettigrew, Eddie Chacon, Josh Deutsch) – 5:47
6. "Sunshine & Happiness" (Amp Fiddler, Eddie Chacon) – 4:58
7. "Smile My Way" (Charles Pettigrew, Phil Galdston) – 2:22
8. "She's So Shy" (Charles Pettigrew, Eddie Chacon) – 5:28
9. "I Can't Find the Words" (Charles Pettigrew, Seth Swirsky) – 4:27
10. "Little Piece of Heaven" (Eddie Chacon, Josh Deutsch) – 4:51
11. "Dear God" (Eddie Chacon) – 4:51
12. "To Someone Else" (Charles Pettigrew) – 3:20
13. "Zarah" (Charles Pettigrew, Eddie Chacon) – 1:44
14. "Your Love" (Eddie Chacon, Seth Swirsky) – 3:45
15. "Best Place in the World" (Charles Pettigrew, Bob Thiele) – 4:44
16. "The Goodbye Song" (Eddie Chacon) – 0:56

== Personnel ==
=== Musicians ===
- Charles Pettigrew – lead and backing vocals, acoustic piano (7), strings (15), organ (16), tambourine (16)
- Eddie Chacon – lead and backing vocals, guitars (16)
- Amp Fiddler – Rhodes piano (1, 5, 6, 8, 13), clavinet (1, 2, 5, 6, 8, 10), organ (1–6, 8, 13), acoustic piano (3), Wurlitzer electric piano (3, 10)
- Garry Hughes – strings (1, 2, 3, 8–12, 14), acoustic piano (2), keyboard programming (2, 3, 5, 8, 10, 14), drum programming (3), synthesizers (5), effects (5), Moog synthesizer (6, 9, 11, 13), bells (9, 11), bass (11), drum loops (11), whistles (11), horns (14)
- Paul Griffin – Rhodes piano (9, 12, 14, 15), organ (9, 10, 11, 14, 15), synthesizers (11)
- Chris Bruce – guitars (1, 4, 10, 14)
- David Fiuczynski – guitars (2, 3, 5, 6, 8, 9, 11, 15, 16), talkbox (8)
- Josh Deutsch – guitars (7, 15), Moog synthesizer (9), strings (15), drums (16)
- Jeff Anderson – bass (1, 3–6, 8–10, 13–15)
- Yossi Fine – bass (2)
- Lonnie Hillyer – wah bass (10)
- Ed Tuton – bass (16)
- Steve Jordan – drums (1)
- Ben Perowsky – drums (2, 15)
- Gene Lake – drums (3, 5, 6, 8, 13)
- Steve Ferrone – drums (4, 9, 10, 14)
- Dan Stein – drum loops (1), keyboard programming (4)
- Alan Friedman – rhythm programming (3, 6, 8, 10), samples (3), sample programming (6, 8)
- Daniel Sadownick – percussion (1, 3–6, 8–10, 13, 15)
- Bashiri Johnson – percussion (2)
- Clark Gayton – trombone (15), horn arrangements (15)
- Ravi Best – trumpet (15)
- Lani Groves – backing vocals (2, 3)
- Vaneese Thomas – backing vocals (2, 3)
- Spragga Benz – toaster (2)
- Pura Fé – guest vocals (8)
- Zarah Isabel Deutsch – guest vocals (13)

=== Production ===
- Josh Deutsch – producer, mixing (1, 2, 4–16)
- Ed Tuton – engineer, mixing (1, 2, 4–16)
- Femi Jiya – mixing (3)
- Jovan Djordjevic – assistant engineer
- Suzanne Dyer – assistant engineer
- Carl Glanville – assistant engineer
- Hillary Johnson – assistant engineer
- François Kevorkian – assistant engineer
- Jennifer McGhee – assistant engineer
- Michael Nucader – assistant engineer, mix assistant (1, 2, 4–16)
- John Parthum – assistant engineer
- Dave Robbins – assistant engineer
- Andy Smith – assistant engineer
- Brian Virtue – assistant engineer
- Dan Kincaid – album sequencing
- Bob Ludwig – mastering
- Artie Smith – production assistant, technician, maintenance
- Janice Pendergast – production coordinator
- Geoffroy De Boismenu – photography
- B Company L.A. – artwork, design
- Andrew Dosunmu – wardrobe, stylist

Studios

- Basic Tracks recorded at The Hit Factory, Sear Sound and Kampo Audio (New York, NY); Track Record Studios (North Hollywood, CA).
- Everything else recorded at RPM Studios, Kampo Audio, Axis Studios, Spa Studios and Electric Lady Studios (New York, NY).
- Tracks 1, 2 & 4–16 mixed at Electric Lady Studios.
- Track 3 recorded at Right Track Recording (New York, NY).
- Mastered at Gateway Mastering (Portland, ME).

=== Weekly charts ===
Chart (1995)	Peak position
Australian Albums (ARIA)	152
