= Charles & Eddie =

American soul duo (1990–1997)

- Charles Pettigrew (left) and Eddie Chacon

Background information
- Origin: New York City, U.S.
- Genres: Soul; neo soul; R&B
- Years active: 1990–1997
- Label: Capitol Records
- Past members: Charles Pettigrew; Eddie Chacon

Charles & Eddie was an American soul music duo composed of Charles Pettigrew and Eddie Chacon. Their single "Would I Lie to You?", taken from their 1992 debut album, Duophonic, won Ivor Novello Awards in 1993 in the Best Contemporary Song, Best-Selling Song and International Hit of the Year categories. From 1992 to 1995 they hit the top 40 three more times in the UK.

== Career as a duo ==
Pettigrew and Chacon were said to have met on the New York City Subway in 1990, on the C train; according to Chacon, one of them was carrying a vinyl copy of the Marvin Gaye album Trouble Man. They released their debut album, Duophonic, on Capitol Records in 1992. It includes the singles "Would I Lie to You?", "N.Y.C." and "House Is Not a Home", and was influenced by classic soul music.

Their second and final album, Chocolate Milk, included "Wounded Bird", which was written and recorded for the film True Romance. It was released in 1995. The duo split amicably in 1997.

== Members ==
=== Charles Pettigrew ===
Charles Pettigrew
- Born: May 12, 1963; Philadelphia, Pennsylvania, U.S.
- Died: April 6, 2001 (aged 37) Philadelphia, Pennsylvania, U.S.
- Genres: R&B; soul
- Occupation: Singer
- Instrument: Vocals
- Years active: 1984–2001
- Label: Capitol
- Formerly of: Down Avenue; Charles & Eddie; Tom Tom Club

Pettigrew was born and raised in Philadelphia. He studied jazz singing at Berklee College of Music in Boston, and was lead singer of the band Down Avenue, who won WBCN's 1985 "Rock 'n Roll Rumble".

In 1998, Pettigrew toured with Tom Tom Club (featuring Chris Frantz and Tina Weymouth from Talking Heads) and went on to join the group, co-writing and singing on several songs until he became too ill to perform.

In the late 1990s, Pettigrew was diagnosed with cancer. He died from the disease on April 6, 2001, at the age of 37.

=== Eddie Chacon ===
Eddie Chacon
- Born: August 22, 1963 (age 63); Oakland, California, U.S.
- Genres: R&B; soul
- Occupation: Singer
- Instrument: Vocals
- Years active: 1984–1997; 2020–present
- Labels: Capitol; Day End Records; Stones Throw

A Hispanic, Chacon was raised in Hayward and Castro Valley, California. He started his first band at age 12 with neighborhood friends Cliff Burton (later of Metallica) and Mike Bordin (later of Faith No More). In his early 20s, Chacon worked as a songwriter for CBS Songs. He made albums for Columbia and Luther Campbell of 2 Live Crew, both of which went unreleased, along with demos made with the Dust Brothers. After splitting with Pettigrew, he worked as a photographer and creative director.

On May 29, 2020, The Fader announced Chacon's return to music after two decades of silence as a singer, referring to him as a "low-key R&B legend". Chacon released the single "My Mind Is Out of Its Mind" from his then forthcoming album, Pleasure, Joy and Happiness on Day End Records. The project was produced and co-written by Solange collaborator John Carroll Kirby and distributed by Light in the Attic Records. On July 15, 2020, KCRW premiered the album's second single, "Trouble". They wrote: "Eddie Chacon's R & B pop exploits are both influential and legendary." On July 29, 2020, The New York Times said: "The album avoids the trappings of a throwback or revival of a bygone era, instead exploring the rarely glimpsed side of that genre's themes of passion and heartbreak, sung by a bruised but wiser man." Mojo magazine wrote: "Neo-Soul veteran returns with a mini modern masterpiece." In 2020 he released a single, "High", with Stones Throw Records' John Carroll Kirby and harpist Nailah Hunter.

His second solo album, Sundown, was released by Stones Throw on March 31, 2023. The album was rated highly on publications including Pitchfork, Record Collector and The Guardian which wrote: "The question that haunts Sundown is whether the unexpected success of Pleasure Joy and Happiness can be replicated. The answer turns out to be a qualified yes."

Chacon released his third solo album, Lay Low, on January 31, 2025.

== Discography ==
=== Albums ===
List of albums, with chart positions
Title	Album details	Peak chart positions				Certifications
Title	Album details	US	AUS	GER	UK	Certifications
Duophonic	Released: August 31, 1992; Format: vinyl, cassette, CD; Label: Capitol Records	153	83	6	19	BPI: Gold
Chocolate Milk	Released: August 31, 1995; Format: vinyl, cassette, CD; Label: Capitol Records	—	152	48	—	
"—" denotes releases that did not chart.

=== Singles ===
Year	Single	Peak chart positions													Certifications	Album
Year	Single	UK	IRE	NLD	BEL (FLA)	FRA	GER	AUT	SWI	SWE	NOR	AUS	NZ	US	Certifications	Album
1992	"Would I Lie to You?"	1	2	2	1	2	1	1	2	3	3	3	1	13	BPI: Platinum; ARIA: Gold	Duophonic
1993	"NYC (Can You Believe This City?)"	33	—	20	28	—	32	29	—	—	—	73	2	—		Duophonic
1993	"House Is Not a Home"	29	—	—	36	—	59	—	—	—	—	128	2	—		Duophonic
1993	"Shine" (FRA only)	—	—	—	—	3	—	—	—	—	—	—	—	—		Duophonic
1995	"I'm Gonna Love You (24-7-365)"	38	—	—	47	—	58	—	26	—	—	112	23	—		Chocolate Milk
1995	"Jealousy"	—	—	—	—	—	68	39	—	—	—	—	—	—		Chocolate Milk
"—" denotes the single failed to chart or was not released.

=== Soundtracks ===
- 1993: "Wounded Bird" (True Romance soundtrack)
- 1993: "Supernatural Thing" (Addams Family Values soundtrack)
- 1993: "I Would Stop the World" (Super Mario Bros. soundtrack)
