= Mikkel Hess =

Danish musician (born 1976)

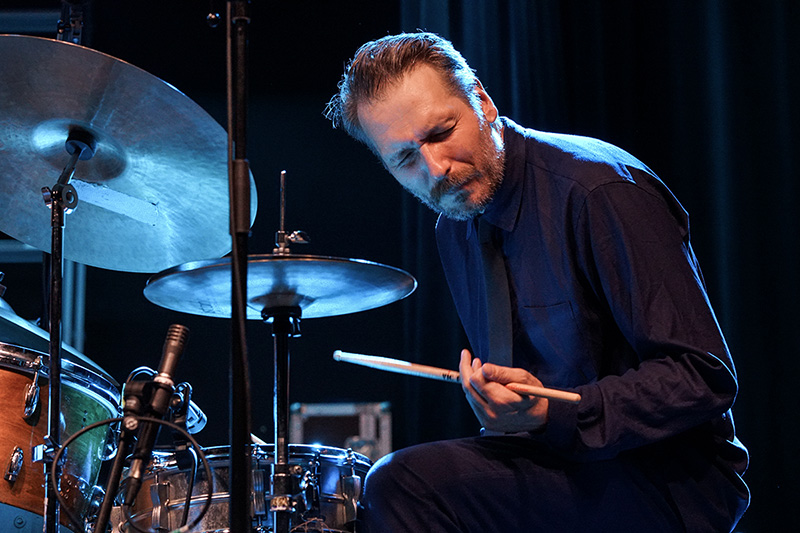
Mikkel Hess at Aarhus Jazz Festival 2017 with Spacelab (Nikolaj Hess (p), AC (b), Mikkel Hess (d))

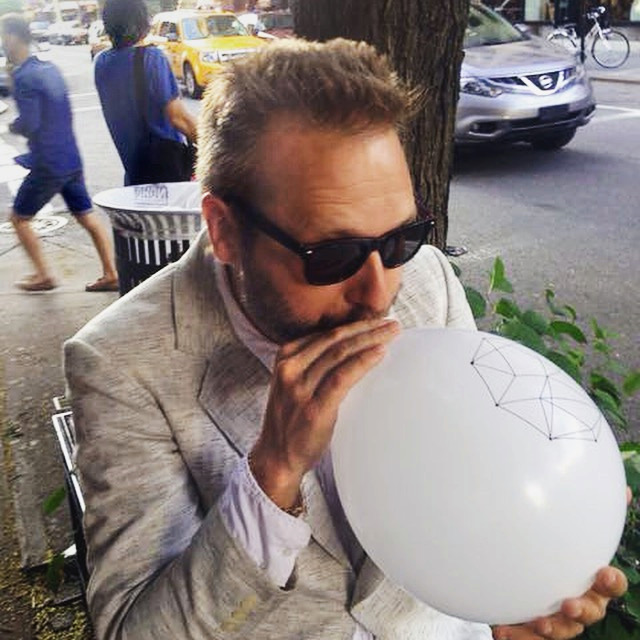
Mikkel Hess

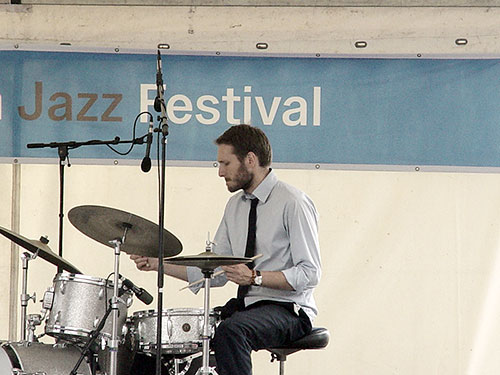
Mikkel Hess at Copenhagen Jazz Festival

Mikkel Hess (born 1976) is a Danish musician best known for his ongoing collaborative project "Hess Is More". Other bands and collaborations include "Hess / AC / Hess Spacelab", "3 x Hess", "Small White Man", "2s and 4s", "Hess / Vibskov Trommefredag" and "SH101 Nightmare".

Mikkel Hess is also active as composer and producer of music for film, theatre and dance. Later works include score for feature films "Woman, Unknown" which won the Golden Lion at Venice Film Festival 2026, "Suicide Tourist" premiering at Sitges Film Festival in 2019 and "When Animals Dream" premiering at Cannes Film Festival 2014. Mikkel has also composed for TV series "Blood Cruise" for SVT / CBS, "Veronika" for Skyshowtime and "Those Who Kill" for Miso Film / Viaplay. Also Mikkel composed and performed music for ballet stagings "UROPA" and "Det Forsømte Forår" both premiering at The Royal Theatre in Denmark.

Over the years Mikkel Hess has also appeared as co-producer, co-writer and drummer on various albums by other artists.

Mikkel Hess graduated in 2001 from The Conservatory in Copenhagen (Rytmisk Musik Konservatorium) and is since 2009 part of studio and label This Is Care Of.
