= Mavi (rapper) =

American rapper (born 1999)

MAVI
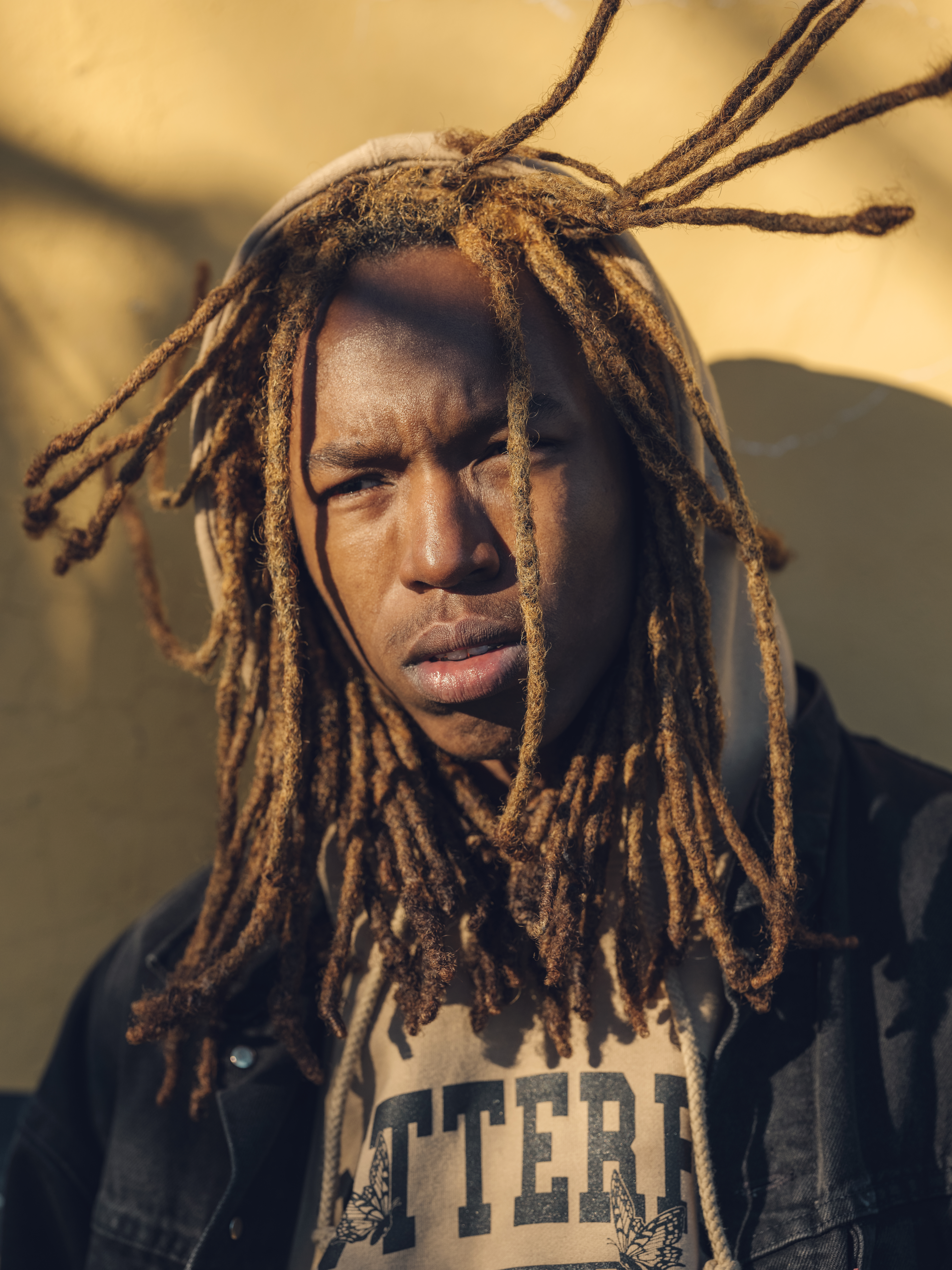
- Mavi in 2020

Background information
- Also known as: Mayor, miracle baby
- Born: Omavi Ammu Minder; October 7, 1999 (age 26); Sumter, South Carolina, U.S.
- Origin: Charlotte, North Carolina, U.S.
- Genres: Southern hip-hop; alternative hip-hop
- Occupations: Rapper; songwriter
- Instrument: Vocals
- Years active: 2014–present
- Label: Mavi 4 Mayor Music
- Website: Management Alicia Gelernt co Zay Shimkin

Omavi Ammu Minder (born October 7, 1999), better known as Mavi (stylized in all caps), is an American rapper from Charlotte, North Carolina. Mavi emerged in 2014 as a member of North Carolina music collective KILLSWITCH, and later rose to prominence in 2019 with the release of his debut solo album Let the Sun Talk and his guest appearance on Earl Sweatshirt's EP Feet of Clay. His most recent album, The Pilot, was released in 2025.

== Artistry ==
Mavi's style draws inspirations from Five-Percent Nation ideologies, which he named his first studio album Let the Sun Talk after. He cites rappers MF Doom and Prodigy of Mobb Deep as his main influences.

Mavi's music is marked by an often existential, intensely poetic writing style, and a laid back delivery. His beat selection leans towards soul-sample heavy, stripped instrumentals. Mavi's musical aesthetic is often associated compared to frequent collaborators Earl Sweatshirt and MIKE. Mavi's songs often reflect his struggles with mental health and sobriety.

== Personal life ==
Mavi's father was a hip-hop producer and a gospel quartet singer.

Mavi was a neuroscience major at Howard University when he released Let the Sun Talk. He dropped out after his music began to garner interest.

== Discography ==
=== Studio albums ===
- Let the Sun Talk (2019)
- Laughing So Hard, it Hurts (2022)
- Shadowbox (2024)

=== Extended plays ===
- End of the Earth (2021)

=== Mixtapes ===
- Beacon (2016)
- No Roses (2017)
- The Pilot (2025)

=== Collaborative albums ===
- Rosewood Records Presents: Killswitch 2017 (as a member of Killswitch) (2017)
- Rosewood Records Presents: Killswitch Vol. 2 2019 (as a member of Killswitch) (2021)
