= Ovrkast. =

- Born: Silas Wilson; January 16, 1998 (age 28)
- Origin: Oakland, California, U.S.
- Genres: Hip-hop; alternative hip-hop
- Occupations: Rapper; record producer
- Instruments: FL Studio; drum kit; sampler; Roland SP-404
- Years active: 2015–present

Silas Wilson (born January 16, 1998), professionally known as Ovrkast. (stylized in lowercase with a period) is an American rapper and record producer from East Oakland, California. He rose to prominence for his production on Earl Sweatshirt's 2019 EP Feet of Clay, and has since collaborated with notable artists such as Drake, Mavi, and Pink Siifu.

== Early life ==
Wilson was born in 1998 in Oakland, California. He attended various schools within the Oakland Unified School District as a teenager. Wilson credits his high school music teacher at Bunche Academy in West Oakland for introducing him to recording studios.

In seventh grade, Wilson met fellow artist Demahjiae at E.C Reems Charter School, forming a long-standing collaborative partnership. The artist's experiences growing up in Oakland, including witnessing violence in his neighborhood and community, influenced his decision to pursue music.

== Career ==
=== 2015–2019: Early beginnings ===
Wilson began his music career in 2015, initially focusing on producing beat tapes. He sold his first beat to rapper Mavi in the same year. In 2016, he started posting beats on Bandcamp and SoundCloud, with his early work described as jazzy.

In 2017, Wilson formed the Oakland rap collective Lo-Fiction alongside Demahjiae and Nimsins, which was notable for nostalgic boom bap sounds that diverged from regionally dominant West Coast hip-hop and drill influences, and gained notoriety after their work was shared by legendary hip-hop producer Pete Rock.

=== 2019–2021: Breakthrough and Try Again ===
Wilson gained wider recognition in 2019 when he produced the track "El Toro Combo Meal" for Earl Sweatshirt's EP Feet of Clay. In 2020, Wilson released his debut mixtape Try Again. The project featured guest appearances from Mavi, Pink Siifu, and Navy Blue. The mixtape explored themes of anxiety, identity, and self-doubt, and received a score of 7.0 from Pitchfork.

=== 2022–present: Reset! and Drake collaboration ===
In November 2023, Wilson produced two tracks, "Red Button" and "The Shoe Fits," for Drake's album For All The Dogs Scary Hours Edition. The same year, Wilson released the EP Reset!, consisting of six songs. The EP showcased a more spare and sprightly sound compared to his earlier work, with Wilson modulating his vocals more and showcasing a wider range of musical styles.

In 2024, Wilson released a single "PayMeAGrip" produced by Cardo Got Wings, part their collaborative EP KastGotWings.

In September 2026, hip-hop duo Outkast filed a lawsuit against Wilson alleging "illegal use of the nearly identical name".

== Artistry ==
Wilson's music style combines hazy, traditionalist boom bap with wavy, loop-based production. His production is often characterized by warm, naturalistic vibes, with sped-up lo-fi beats, disjointed timing, instrumentation, and soul samples. Some listeners have compared his production style to that of J Dilla.

As a rapper, Wilson's delivery is often described as subdued and monotone, yet self-assured. His lyrical style is noted for its anxious and observational quality, often featuring autobiographical soul-searching and existential themes.

Wilson cites Knxwledge, Madlib, and J Dilla as key inspirations, and describes Knxwledge's old beat tapes as "the score to my adolescence." For rapping, he cites Mach-Hommy, Mavi, and Demahjiae as influences. His early musical influences also include Odd Future, Capital Steez, Flying Lotus, and mixtape sites like DatPiff.

== Discography ==
=== Studio albums ===
- Try Again (2020)
- While the Iron Is Hot (2025)
- STRIKING (2026)

=== EPs ===
- Reset! (2023)
- KastGotWings (with Cardo) (2024)
