= To Die in Mexico =

2011 non-fiction book

- Author: John Gibler
- Language: English
- Genre: Non-fiction
- Publisher: City Lights Books
- Publication date: 2011
- Pages: 200
- ISBN: 978-0-87286-517-4

To Die in Mexico: Dispatches from Inside the Drug War is a book by John Gibler published in 2011. This is his second book, following Mexico Unconquered: Chronicles of Power and Revolt (2009). The work combines reporting and discussion with people involved with and affected by Mexico's drug war. To Die in Mexico includes stories of kidnapped Mexican journalists, and family members of people killed in conflict.

== Inspiration ==
The idea for To Die in Mexico came to Gibler after his experiences of covering the Zapatistas during 2006. When the Zapatistas issued the Sixth Declaration of the Lacandon Jungle and announced the sixth-month listening tour that would be the first phase of the Other Campaign, there was a special call out to the alternative media to accompany this tour and use that as a way into all the untold stories of Mexico's struggling peoples. This is how the author became involved.

The following events of 2006 provided material Gibler would later draw from: the police repression in San Salvador Atenco, controversies surrounding the 2006 Mexican general election, and the sixth-month-long unarmed uprising in Oaxaca.
