= Fit Me In =

EP by Frankie Cosmos
- Released: November 13, 2015
- Genre: Indie pop
- Length: 7:35
- Language: English
- Label: Bayonet Records
- Producer: Aaron Maine

Frankie Cosmos chronology
Zentropy (2014)	Fit Me In (2015)	Next Thing (2016)

Fit Me In is a 2015 extended play by American indie pop musical act Frankie Cosmos.

== Reception ==
Writing for Pitchfork Media, Jes Skolnik rated this EP a 7.0 out of 10, characterizing it as "a compact and efficient EP portending a more fleshed-out full-band LP in 2016, is an experiment in what Kline's songwriting would sound like given nearly all electronic instrumentation" and comparing the lyrics to a compelling and well-written diary. Sasha Geffen of Vulture note that this album includes electronic music influences as a first for Frankie Cosmos, which paired with introspective lyrics, results in a "delightful new EP". TinyMixTapes' Rob Arcand rated this release 3.5 out of five, noting the similarities with producer Aaron Maine's band Porches and sums up "despite all the pressure and expectations, Fit Me In surprisingly delivers".

== Track listing ==
1. "Korean Food" – 1:59
2. "Young" – 2:02
3. "O Contest Winner" – 2:46
4. "Sand" – 0:48

== Personnel ==
- Greta Kline – guitar, vocals
- Aaron Maine – production

== See also ==
- List of 2015 albums
