= Close It Quietly =

Studio album by Frankie Cosmos
- Released: September 6, 2019
- Genre: Indie pop
- Length: 39:36
- Language: English
- Label: Sub Pop
- Producer: Alex Bailey; Greta Kline; Lauren Martin; Luke Pyenson; Gabe Wax

Frankie Cosmos chronology
Haunted Items (2019)	Close It Quietly (2019)	Inner World Peace (2022)

Close It Quietly is a 2019 studio album by American indie pop musical act Frankie Cosmos. The first release as a full band alongside frontwoman Greta Kline, this release has received positive reviews from critics.

== Reception ==
According to the review aggregator Metacritic, Close It Quietly received "generally favorable reviews" based on a weighted average score of 76 out of 100 from 12 critic scores. Editors at AllMusic Guide scored this release four out of five stars, with critic Marcy Donelson noting that the lyrics "bounce between heartache, affection, self-consciousness, and playfulness, disappointment hovers like a cloud overhead" and this album continues "Kline's reputation as one of indie pop's most reliable songsmiths". Sasha Geffen of Pitchfork Media rated Close It Quietly a 7.1 out of 10, praising songwriter Greta Kline's progress as a musician, noting that she "wades fearlessly into that process of continual unearthing, casting off what used to make sense and what doesn't anymore—old relationships, old habits, old vantages on a world that grows more complex by the day". Mark Moody of No Ripcord gave the same rating, praising the shift from being a Kline solo act to a full band that "yields an embarrassment of eminently listenable indie-rock gems". Calling Close It Quietly a "tour de force songwriting binge" and giving it four out of five stars, Jon Dolan of Rolling Stone praises Kline's lyrics and vocals, writing that "she speaks not so much for the voiceless but for those who can take or leave the very notion of having a voice in the first place, for every tender soul out there who'd rather stare at a metaphor-rich arrangement of fall branches than go to a party". Another eight out of 10 came from Oliver Kuscher of The Line of Best Fit, who notes that this album includes darker themes not featured on earlier Frankie Cosmos work and "none of that has quashed her voracious creativity or suffocated her unique voice". Clare Martin of Paste gave this release a 7.6 out of 10, opining that the full band approach "edges closer to discovering their full potential by revisiting their past selves and adding new zest" summing up that this album "sees the band take a few steps forward, sideways and back—an aural square dance that's well worth your time".

Ryan Haughey of Exclaim! rated this album an eight out of 10, noting the "pace of the album is set at a brisk run, but it never gets sweaty, so you'd never notice how quick it is — or how hard it's working". In The Irish Times, Dean Van Nguyen gave this album four out of five stars, assessing that this work "offers only mild alterations to a winning formula" and considers this stronger than the 2018 album Vessel. Mark Newington of musicOMH sums up his positive review, "it's a real skill to make what is essentially pop music that also manages to combine depth in lyrics and cheerful tunes, and on this album Frankie Cosmos absolutely excel". Blaise Radley of Under the Radar rated this album a seven out of 10, writing that "the musical tone is consistent, but enveloping, and Kline's stream-of-consciousness outpourings are as transgressive as any squawked political missive". Writing for The Skinny, Hayley Scott gave Close It Quietly three out of five stars, writing that it "doesn't sound particularly exciting or new, but it certainly succeeds at its intentions – it's a triumphant album for people that find catharsis in indie pop's niceness".

== Track listing ==
All songs written by Greta Kline

1. "Moonsea" – 2:02
2. "Cosmic Shop" – 1:53
3. "41st" – 2:06
4. "So Blue" – 2:20
5. "A Joke" – 2:21
6. "Rings (on a Tree)" – 1:44
7. "Actin’ Weird" – 1:10
8. "Windows" – 2:47
9. "Never Would" – 1:47
10. "Self‐Destruct" – 0:46
11. "Wannago" – 3:17
12. "I'm It" – 2:00
13. "Trunk of a Tree" – 0:58
14. "Last Season's Textures" – 2:07
15. "Even Though I Knew" – 1:32
16. "UFO" – 1:44
17. "Marbles" – 2:11
18. "Did You Find" – 1:15
19. "A Hit" – 1:27
20. "With Great Purpose" – 1:23
21. "This Swirling" – 2:46

== Personnel ==
Frankie Cosmos

- Alex Bailey – bass guitar, arrangement, production
- Greta Kline – vocals, guitar, arrangement, production
- Lauren Martin – keyboards, arrangement, production, album cover
- Luke Pyenson – drums, arrangement, production

Additional personnel

- Josh Bonati – mastering
- Phoebe Cates – harmonies on "With Great Purpose"
- Dominic Coles – modular synthesizer on "Moonsea" and "Never Would"
- Eliza Doyle – internal artwork
- Kevin Kline – piano on "With Great Purpose"
- Nate Mendelsohn – saxophone on "Even Though I Knew", engineering assistance
- Gabe Wax – mixing, production

== See also ==
- List of 2019 albums
