= Joe LeSueur =

American poet and screenwriter

Joseph Madison LeSueur (September 15, 1924 – May 14, 2001) was an American poet and screenwriter. He is known as a lover of Frank O'Hara and the author of Digressions on Some Poems by Frank O’Hara: A Memoir.

== Life ==
LeSueur grew up in Los Angeles, California and was raised a member of the Church of Jesus Christ of Latter-day Saints. He served in World War II and attended the University of Southern California on the GI Bill. After graduating with a degree in English, he moved to New York City in 1949. LeSueur met O'Hara at a party in 1951, and the two lived together between 1955 and 1965. During these years, O'Hara wrote many of his most famous poems, including the collection Lunch Poems. From 1959 to 1963, the two lived at 441 East 9th St in the East Village. As a member of the New York literary and art scenes, LeSueur knew Andy Warhol and the two conspired to write a movie together. He was also a friend of the writer and translator Patsy Southgate.

LeSueur's social circle is depicted in Wynn Chamberlain's diptych "Poets Dressed and Undressed," which shows LeSueur alongside O'Hara, Joe Brainard, and Frank Lima.

LeSueur died on May 14, 2001, in East Hampton, New York, aged 76.

== Career ==
Having worked as an editor and critic, LeSueur eventually found work as a regular writer for the soap opera Guiding Light. He was a writer for several TV series, including Another World (1964), Texas (1980) and Ryan's Hope (1975).

With Bill Berkson, he edited the book Homage to Frank O'Hara (Big Sky Books, 1978).

Digressions on Some Poems by Frank O’Hara: A Memoir is a book that weaves together poems by O'Hara and LeSueur's own memoir. LeSueur finished the book shortly before his own death in 2001.
