= Frank Lima (poet) =

American poet

- Born: 1939; Spanish Harlem, New York City
- Died: October 21, 2013 (aged 73–74); Long Island, New York
- Occupation: American poet

Frank Lima (1939 in Spanish Harlem, New York City, New York, US – October 21, 2013 in Long Island, New York) was an American poet most closely associated with the New York School. He was born to a Mexican father and Puerto Rican mother. He would reference his pre Columbian ethnicity and the two Latino cultures he came from as large influences on his works but did not want to be called a ‘Latino poet’ because he believed it to be a limiting term that was only needed for introducing people to his work. He also did not want himself or his work to be associated with the New York School Poets, though he appreciated their friendship.

== Relationships ==
Lima maintained a close friendship with the leading New York School poet Frank O’Hara. In a 2001 interview, Lima stated: “Frank [O'Hara], without a doubt, has been the most influential person and poet in my life, other than Kenneth Koch. I am just beginning to realize how important he was in my life.” During the course of their relationship, O’Hara helped Lima through his drug abuse, homelessness and raised money to get him a psychotherapist.

== Childhood ==
During his childhood, Lima experienced physical and sexual abuse from both his parents and a priest. He wrote about the sexual abuse he faced in multiple poems including ‘Mom I’m All Screwed Up’ and ‘Scattered Vignettes’. Lima dropped out of school when he was fourteen and eventually ended up in a juvenile drug rehabilitation program which he went in and out of from 1956 to 1960. This program is where the painter Sherman Drexler was teaching and he influenced Lima to start writing. Lima claimed that Drexler was the reason he started writing poetry and that “My intentions were never to be a poet. (...) [Sherman Drexler] said, "Write like you talk." End of story.”

== Education ==
Lima received his MFA from Columbia University where he studied under among others Kenneth Koch and Stanley Kunitz. His published volumes of verse include; Inventory (1964), Underground with the Oriole (1971 E.P. Dutton), Angel, New Poems (1976 Liveright Publications), Inventory: New & Selected Poems (1997 Hard Press) and The Beatitudes (2000).

== Career as chef ==
Lima was also a classically trained chef who taught at the New York Restaurant School and was an assistant chef at the White House during the John Fitzgerald Kennedy administration.

== Public presence ==
Lima was depicted in Wynn Chamberlain's noted diptych "Poets Dressed and Undressed", which portrays the quartet of Joe Brainard, Frank O'Hara, Joe LeSueur and Lima in successive panels, clothed and then naked.

== Posthumous publications ==
- Incidents of Travel in Poetry: New and Selected Poems (City Lights, 2015)
