= Pool (Porches album) =

Studio album by Porches
- Released: February 5, 2016
- Studio: Aaron Maine's apartment in Manhattan; Business District; Salvation Recording Co., New Paltz, New York
- Genre: Synth-pop; electronic; indie rock
- Length: 38:11
- Label: Domino
- Producer: Aaron Maine

Porches chronology
Slow Dance in the Cosmos (2013)	Pool (2016)	The House (2018)

Singles from Pool
- 1. "Hour" Released: October 8, 2015; 2. "Be Apart" Released: January 6, 2016; 3. "Car" Released: February 1, 2016

Pool is the second studio album by New York-based musician Aaron Maine's Porches project. The albums basic tracking (drums/percussion, guitar and bass) at Business District Engineered by Hunter Davidsohn, finished by Maine in Maine's New York City apartment, and released on February 5, 2016 on Domino Records.

== Critical reception ==
Professional ratings
Aggregate scores
Source	Rating
Metacritic	75/100
Review scores
Source	Rating
AllMusic	3.5/5 stars
Consequence of Sound	C+
DIY	3/5 stars
Exclaim!	8/10
The Line of Best Fit	6.5/10
musicOMH	3.5/5 stars
Pitchfork	8.3/10
Rolling Stone	3.5/5 stars
Spin	8/10
Uncut	7/10

Pool received largely positive reviews from contemporary music critics. At Metacritic, which assigns a normalized rating out of 100 to reviews from mainstream critics, the album received an average score of 75, based on 15 reviews, which indicates "generally favorable reviews".

Jeremy Gordon of Pitchfork Media praised the album, stating, "Pool is an introspective record, tailormade for lonesome nights. It was made in Maine’s apartment, and while the record has a noticeably professional pop sheen, there are still vestigial hints of amateurism (such as the sound of fingers squeaking against the strings on album opener "Underwater") that convince me of its ideal setting. Anyone who lives in a city knows how easy it is to be pulled between lonely apartments and lonelier dance floors. By the end, the appeal of water becomes clear. You immerse yourself in it, disappearing from the rest of the world, but you’re still close to land."

== Track listing ==
All tracks are written by Aaron Maine.

No.	Title	Length
1.	"Underwater"	4:00
2.	"Braid"	3:26
3.	"Be Apart"	3:05
4.	"Mood"	2:28
5.	"Hour"	3:06
6.	"Even the Shadow"	3:24
7.	"Pool"	3:13
8.	"Glow"	2:49
9.	"Car"	2:35
10.	"Shaver"	3:40
11.	"Shape"	3:19
12.	"Security"	3:06
Total length:		38:11

== Personnel ==
Porches

- Aaron Maine – writing, performing, recording, production, engineering, photography
- Cameron Wisch – drums (3, 4, 8, 9, 12), performing
- Kevin Farrant – guitar (4, 8, 9), performing
- Maya Laner – vocals (8), performing
- Seiya Jewell – performing

Additional personnel

- Greta Kline – vocals (2, 3, 5), bass (4, 8, 9)
- Taylor Clay – saxophone (12)
- Hunter Davidsohn – live drums recording, additional guitars recording
- Adam Goldsmith - synthesizer, keyboards
- Christopher Daly – vocal recording (1, 3, 4)
- Chris Coady – mixing
- Greg Calbi – mastering
- Jessica Lehrman – cover photo photography

== Charts ==
Chart (2016)	Peak position
US Heatseekers Albums (Billboard)	12
US Independent Albums (Billboard)	39
US Top Rock Albums (Billboard)	49
