= Haunted Items =

- Cover to Haunted Items #1, other EPs have the same items in a different arrangement

EP by Frankie Cosmos
- Released: 2019
- Studio: The Creamery
- Genre: Indie rock
- Language: English
- Label: Sub Pop
- Producers: Greta Kline; Mark Yoshizumi

Frankie Cosmos chronology
Vessel (2018)	Haunted Items (2019)	Close It Quietly (2019)

Haunted Things is a series of four extended plays by American indie pop artist Frankie Cosmos.

== Reception ==
Writing for Pitchfork Media, Arielle Gordon rated this EP series 7.6 out of 10, noting that these songs were composed on piano, which is a novelty for this musical act, and results in "an affectation that plays out in the small rhymes and repetitions that punctuate the EPs". In 34th Street Magazine, Julia Davis wrote that band leader Greta Kline "has mastered indie rock" with this series. Discussing the first release for Paste, Clare Martin notes the sparse instrumentation and considers the music "almost Joni Mitchell-esque" and the group "wield vulnerability like a weapon".

== Track listing ==
All songs written by Greta Kline

EP #1, released March 13, 2019

1. "Dancing" – 1:41
2. "Tunnel" – 1:52

EP #2, released March 20, 2019

1. "February" – 1:41
2. "In the World" – 1:24

EP #3, released March 27, 2019

1. "String" – 0:42
2. "Eternal" – 2:46

EP #4, released April 3, 2019

1. "Rings on a Tree" – 1:46
2. "Allowed" – 0:44
3. "Today's Special" – 0:58

== Personnel ==
- Greta Kline – piano, vocals, production, artwork
- Bridget Beorse – compositing
- Josh Bonati – mastering
- Eliza Doyle – photography
- Lauren Martin – font
- Mark Yoshizumi – engineering, production

== See also ==
- List of 2019 albums
