= Mexico Unconquered =

- First edition cover of Mexico Unconquered
- Author: John Gibler
- Language: English
- Genre: Nonfiction
- Publisher: City Lights
- Publication date: February 2009
- Pages: 260 pp
- ISBN: 978-0-87286-493-1
- Followed by: To Die in Mexico: Dispatches from Inside the Drug War

Mexico Unconquered: Chronicles of Power and Revolt is a book by John Gibler on national and regional politics in Mexico. The text discusses Mexico's historical continuity of conquest and the social movements that have formed as a result. Mexico Unconquered was published in 2009 by City Lights Books.
