= Different Talking =

Studio album by Frankie Cosmos
- Released: June 27, 2025
- Genre: Indie rock
- Length: 38:16
- Label: Sub Pop
- Producer: Frankie Cosmos

Frankie Cosmos chronology
Inner World Peace (2022)	Different Talking (2025)

Singles from Different Talking
- 1. "Vanity" Released: April 9, 2025; 2. "Bitch Heart" Released: May 6, 2025; 3. "Pressed Flower" Released: June 4, 2025

Different Talking is the sixth studio album by American band Frankie Cosmos, led by Greta Kline. It was released on June 27, 2025, via Sub Pop in LP, CD, cassette and digital formats.

== Background ==
Written, produced and recorded by the band in upstate New York in a house lived in by them, the album was the fourth release through Sub Pop and was preceded by the band's 2022 project, Inner World Peace. Consisting of seventeen tracks, each between one and two minutes, the album was noted as an indie rock album. The first single, "Vanity", was released on April 9, 2025, alongside a music video featuring the band members conducting the recording session of the album.

== Reception ==
Professional ratings
Review scores
Source	Rating
AllMusic	4/5 stars
Mojo	4/5 stars
Paste	6.8/10
Pitchfork	7.5/10
The Skinny	3/5 stars
Spectrum Culture	79%

Hot Press described the album as "a sturdy indie-rock record with aging and the passage of time as main themes." It received a four-star rating from AllMusic, whose reviewer Marcy Donelson noted it as "a tight 17-track, 38-minute album that should be welcomed by all fans but especially by millennials (and elder zoomers) aging alongside the beloved songwriter."

Spectrum Culture rated it 79% and referred to it as "a bright, breezy album that picks up its pace often enough to maintain momentum." It was rated 7.5 out of ten by Pitchfork's Marissa Lorusso, who called it "a tribute to holding your younger self with you as you grow." Stephen Thomas Erlewine, writing for Mojo, gave the album a rating of four stars, stating "Singing with a sweet weariness, Kline can seem bemused by her melancholia, her resigned acceptance given an appealing warmth by a band whose gentle sway lends her pop miniatures depth."

Sam Rosenberg of Paste gave it a rating of 6.8 and commented, "Without enough substance underneath its affable presentation, Different Talking doesn't feel all that different from what she's done before." The Skinny rated the album three stars, stating "Despite treading familiar territory, Different Talking's soothing melodies are tailor-made to accompany life's quiet corners."

== Track listing ==
Different Talking track listing
No.	Title	Length
1.	"Pressed Flower"	1:58
2.	"One of Each"	1:55
3.	"Against the Grain"	2:25
4.	"Bitch Heart"	2:24
5.	"Porcelain"	2:42
6.	"One! Grey! Hair!"	2:01
7.	"Vanity"	2:33
8.	"Not Long"	1:36
9.	"Margareta"	2:08
10.	"Your Take On"	1:59
11.	"High Five Handshake"	2:47
12.	"You Become"	2:46
13.	"Joyride"	2:26
14.	"Tomorrow"	2:27
15.	"Wonderland"	2:06
16.	"Life Back"	1:38
17.	"Pothole"	1:55
Total length:		38:16

== Personnel ==
Credits for Different Talking adapted from Bandcamp.

- Greta Kline – songwriting, arrangement, performance, production, recording, additional engineering
- Alex Bailey – arrangement, performance, production, recording, additional engineering
- Hugo Stanley – arrangement, performance, production, recording
- Katie Von Schleicher – arrangement, performance, production, recording, engineering
- Eli Crews – mixing
- Josh Bonati – mastering
- Levi Seitz – lacquer cutting
- Erica Newton – additional hand claps on "Joyride"
- Claudine Jean-Louis – lyric contribution on "High Five Handshake"
- Molly Schaeffer – lyric sheet
- Phoebe Kline – cover photo
- Dusty Summers – album art design
- Darrell Wilks – vinyl and CD label design
