= Wynn Chamberlain =

Elwyn Moody "Wynn" Chamberlain (19 May 1927 – 27 November 2014), was an American artist , film maker and author. Described by The New York Times as a "pioneer realist painter", Chamberlain has two works, Interior: Late August (1955) and The Barricade (1958), in the permanent collection of the Smithsonian American Art Museum.

== Early life ==
Elwyn Chamberlain was born in Minneapolis, Minnesota, in 1927. After serving in the US Navy from 1944 to 1946, he studied art at the University of Idaho, where he graduated with a bachelor's degree in 1949. He then took a master's degree in philosophy at the University of Wisconsin, while continuing to paint and studying with the Magic realist artist, John Wilde.

== Art career ==
He had his first solo exhibition in Milwaukee in 1951, and three years later he had his first New York City solo exhibition at the Edwin Hewitt Gallery. Throughout the 1950s and 1960s his realist landscapes, interior scenes, and allegorical paintings were exhibited throughout the United States and in Europe. Although his work tended to become more abstract in the 1960s, he had a major exhibition of nude portraits at the Fischbach Gallery in 1965. The portraits were of New York literary and artistic figures of the time. One of the most famous of these is Poets Dressed and Undressed, two panels portraying Joe Brainard, Frank O'Hara, Joe LeSueur and Frank Lima. The exhibition also included a nude portrait of Allen Ginsberg who wrote the publicity flyer for the exhibition (Chamberlain's "Nakeds") as well as notes for the catalogue, wherein he equated Chamberlain's nudes with the ecstatic poetry of William Blake.

In the 1960s Chamberlain also became involved in Andy Warhol's circle. In the latter part of that decade he increasingly turned from painting to film and theatre. In 1967 he produced the premiere of Charles Ludlam's Conquest of the Universe at the Bouwerie Lane Theatre, directed by John Vaccaro and starring several members of Andy Warhol's Factory, including Taylor Mead and Ultra Violet. Chamberlain also wrote, produced and directed the film Brand X which premiered in 1970. The film, a satire on American television commercials, included Taylor Mead, Candy Darling, Abbie Hoffman, Baby Jane Holzer and Sam Shepard in the cast.

On 7 September 1965, in Staatsburg, New York, Chamberlain married Sally Stokes, the former wife of John Sergeant Cram III and a daughter of Frederick Hallock Stokes. The couple had two children in 1968, fraternal twins Sara Ninigret Stokes Chamberlain and Samuel Wyandance Stokes Chamberlain.

== Later life ==
In 1970, Chamberlain left the underground scene and the art world behind. He burned his paintings and left for India with his wife and children. The family were to live there for five years – in the Terai with a Tantric yogi, in the village of Kollur in Karnataka, and in Bangalore, in an old colonial mansion once owned by Arthur Wellesley. On their return to the United States in 1975, they bought land in California's Mendocino County, lived in a tent for three years, built their house and grew most of their own food. It was during this time that Chamberlain became a novelist. His first novel, Gates of Fire, was published by Grove Press in 1978. Gates of Fire, like his third novel, Then Spoke the Thunder, is set in India.

As of 2009 Chamberlain was living in Marrakesh, Morocco.

Chamberlain died in New Delhi, India, of heart failure on 27 November 2014, at the age of 87.

== Novels ==
- Gates of Fire (1978) Grove Press, ISBN 0-394-50162-4 (also published in Spanish as El guru (1979) Martínez Roca, ISBN 84-270-0540-7 and in Dutch as Door een poort Van Vuur (1980) Omega, ISBN 90-6057-077-4)
- Hound Dog (1984) North Atlantic Press ISBN 0-938190-25-3
- Then Spoke the Thunder (1987) Grove Press (also published in French as La nuit tomba sur Kotagarth (1990) Laffont, ISBN 2-221-05995-6)
- Paradise (2006) Kadmos Publishing
