= Todd Miller (journalist) =

American journalist

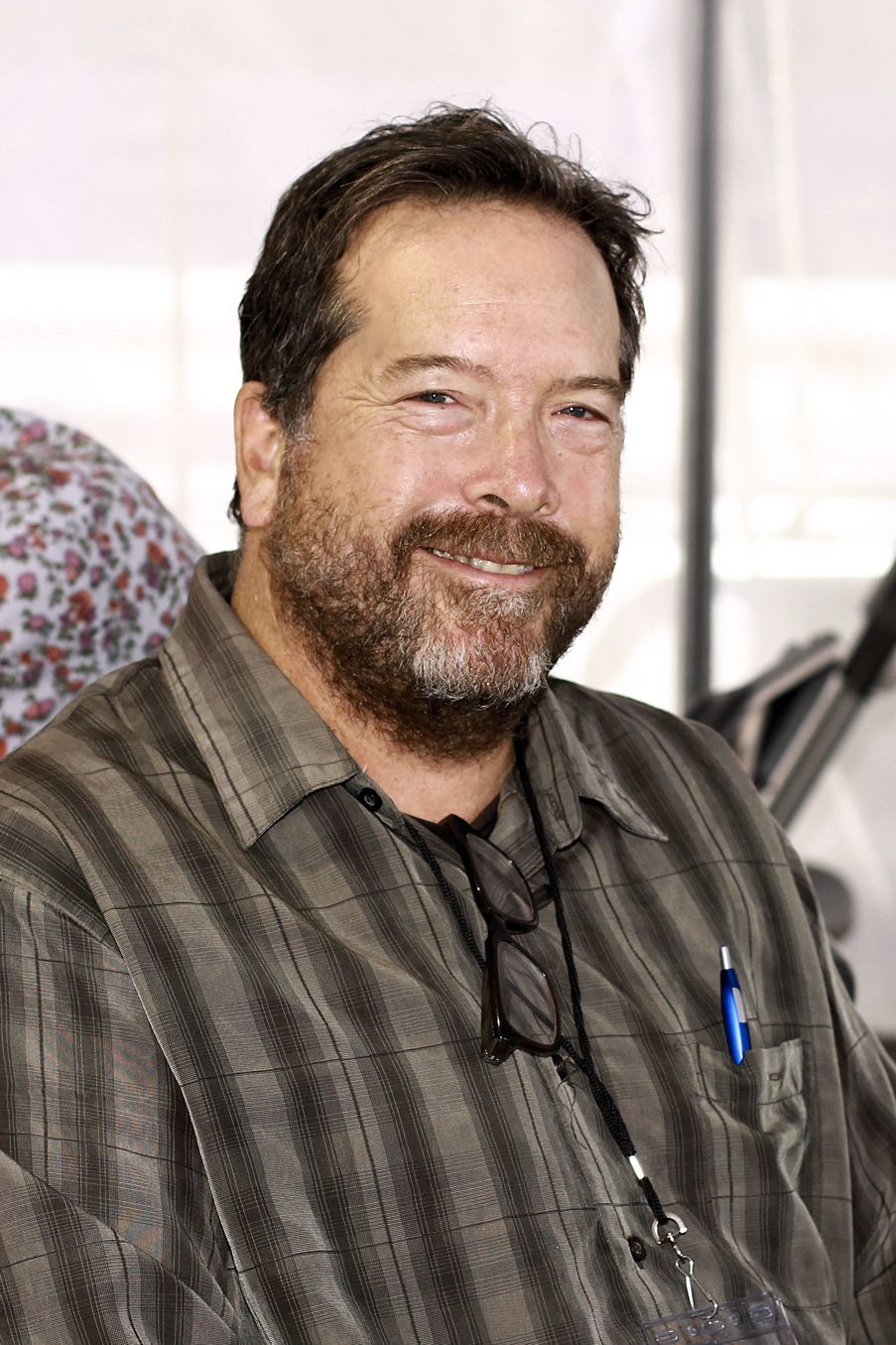
- Miller at the 2019 Texas Book Festival
- Writing career
- Notable work: Storming the Wall
- Website: toddmillerwriter.com

Todd Miller is a journalist based in Tucson, Arizona. He is most notably the author of Storming the Wall: Climate Change, Migration, and Homeland Security (2017).

== Biography ==
For over a decade and a half, Miller has written about border and immigration issues between the United States and Mexico. He is a contributing editor on the NACLA Report on the Americas’ blog "Border Wars", and his work has also appeared in such places as the New York Times, The Nation, Guernica, and Common Dreams.

Miller lives in Tucson, Arizona. Miller has worked for both Borderlinks in Arizona and Witness for Peace in Oaxaca, Mexico, researching and assisting in resolving immigration issues.

His first book, Border Patrol Nation: Dispatches from the Front Lines of Homeland Security was published in 2014. His second book Storming the Wall: Climate Change, Migration, and Homeland Security was published in 2017 and covers the interrelated nature of human migration, climate change, corporate investment in border militarization, and sustainability and environmental justice movements. His third book Empire of Borders: The Expansion of the U.S. Border Around the World was published in 2019 and traces the externalization of the U.S. border apparatus abroad. His fourth book Build Bridges, Not Walls: A Journey to a World Without Borders is a meditation and reflection on his other work that attempts to imagine a new world without border enforcement.

He currently writes for The Border Chronicle with fellow border journalist Melissa del Bosque.

== Bibliography ==
- Border Patrol Nation: Dispatches from the Front Lines of Homeland Security (City Lights Publishers, 2014) ISBN 9780872866317
- Storming the Wall: Climate Change, Migration, and Homeland Security (City Lights Publishers, 2017) ISBN 9780872867154
- Empire of Borders: The Expansion of the U.S. Border Around the World (Verso Books, 2019) ISBN 9781784785116
- Build Bridges, Not Walls (City Lights Publishers, 2021) ISBN 9780872868342.
