= Maya Laner =

American musician

- Also known as: True Blue
- Born: 1994 or 1995 (age 31–32)
- Instruments: Guitar, bass guitar
- Member of: Porches

Maya Laner (born 1994 or 1995) is an American musician. She is the bassist of the synth-pop band Porches. Since 2017, she has recorded music under the name True Blue.

== Discography ==
=== Albums ===
- Star Witness (2025)

=== EPs ===
- Edge Of (2018)

=== Singles ===
- I Wanna Believe
- Truest of Blues
- Star Witness
- Bad Behavior (2017)
- Tell Me Texas (2018)
