= Masha Tupitsyn =

American writer and cultural critic

- Born: New York City
- Occupations: Writer, critic
- Relatives: Margarita Tupitsyn, Victor Tupitsyn
- Writing career
- Notable works: LACONIA: 1,200 Tweets on Film, Life As We Show It: Writing On Film, Beauty Talk & Monsters
- Website: mashatupitsyn.com

Masha Tupitsyn is an American writer and cultural critic based in New York City.

Tupitsyn's writing focuses on contemporary cinema and experiments with form and genre, using media including Twitter, video essays, and Tumblr to produce innovative work. Recurring themes in her work include gender, sexuality, spectatorship, childhood, time, the human face, the politics of beauty and acting, 70s culture and aesthetics, screen persona, love, and the relationship between onscreen and offscreen in 21st-century culture.

== Education ==
Tupitsyn received her B.A. in Literature and Cultural Studies from The New School for Social Research and her MA in Literature and Cultural Theory from the University of Sussex in England. She is currently a PhD candidate in philosophy at the European Graduate School. She teaches film studies and literature at The New School in New York City.

== Films ==
=== LACONIA: 1,200 Tweets on Film ===
Tupitsyn's most recent book of film criticism, LACONIA: 1,200 Tweets on Film, was written entirely on Twitter between the years 2009–2010, and was subsequently published as a print book by Zer0 Books in 2011. LACONIA: 1,200 Tweets on Film uses social media to explore the changing ways that we consume and construct narrative in the 21st century.

=== Love Sounds ===
The final installment of an immaterial trilogy that began in 2011, Love Sounds (2015), is a 24-hour audio history and essay of love in cinema that dematerializes cinema's visual legacy and reconstitutes it as an all-tonal history of critical listening.

=== DECADES ===
DECADES is an ongoing durational film series that composes a 20th history of cinematic sound and score for each decade of the 20th century. In 2017 and 2018, Tupitsyn completed the first and second installment of DECADES, the 1970s and the 1980s.

=== BULK COLLECTION, 2022 ===
Bulk Collection, 2022

== Books ==
- Time Tells, vol. 1, 2023
- Picture Cycle, 2019
- Love Sounds, 2015
- Love Dog. Penny-Ante Editions. 2013.
- Like Someone in Love. Penny-Ante Editions. November 2013.
- LACONIA: 1,200 Tweets on Film. Zer0 Books. (2011)
- Life As We Show It: Writing on Film, Published by City Lights Bookstore (2009) (co-edited with filmmaker and writer Brian Pera)
- Beauty Talk and Monsters, Published by Semiotext(e), Native Agents (2007)

== Selected articles and stories ==
- "Under The Sign of Love: A Dialogue With Masha Tupitsyn," Notebook, 2015
- "Masha Tupitsyn by Charity Coleman," BOMB, 2015
- "Ever Since the World Began: A Reading & Interview with Masha Tupitsyn," in continent. 3.1 (2013): 7–12.
- "The Acting Personality," Indiewire's Press Play, 2013
- "False Moves," The American Tetralogy, 2013
- "Ghost World (Like A Bad Dream," The New Inquiry, 2013
- "Famous Tombs: Love in The 90s," The White Review, 2013
- "A Sentimental Education," Berfrois, 2013
- "Ever Since This World Began," Berfrois, 2012
- "Sonic Heart (Genealogy in Song," Berfrois, 2012
- "Notes on Fame (Do You Know Who You Are?," Berfrois, 2012
- "Time for Nothing" a radio play for Performa 11, 2011
- "Solace," Specter Magazine, 2011
- "In the Time of Fear: On the Films of Ingmar Bergman and Derek Jarman," Keyframe, 2011
- "All An Act,” from Star Notes: John Cusack and The Politics of Acting, Boing Boing, 2011
- "Prettier in Pink," Ryeberg Curated Video, 2011
- “David Bowie and Mark Zuckerberg Play With Time,” Ryeberg Curated Video, 2011
- "Lost Highway," Ryeberg Curated Video, 2011 "
- “Love Story,” Ryeberg Curated Video, 2010 "Screen to Screen,”
- “I Touch Myself,” Ryeberg Curated Video, 2010
- “Untitled (On Devils),” The Rumpus, 2009
- "Kleptomania," (Beauty Talk & Monsters), 2008
- "Movie Men (Beauty Talk & Monsters)," NYFA Current, 2007
- “Houses (or The Uncanny Glows in the Dark)," (Beauty Talk & Monsters). Drunken boat, Issue 8, 2006
