= Ricky Music =

Studio album by Porches
- Released: March 13, 2020
- Genre: Synth-pop
- Length: 23:38
- Label: Domino
- Producers: Aaron Maine; Jake Portrait

Porches chronology
The House (2018)	Ricky Music (2020)	All Day Gentle Hold ! (2021)

Professional ratings
Aggregate scores
Source	Rating
AnyDecentMusic?	6.3/10
Metacritic	69/100
Review scores
Source	Rating
AllMusic	3.5/5 stars
Clash	5/10
DIY	3/5 stars
Exclaim!	7/10
NME	4/5 stars
Paste	7.5/10
Pitchfork	6.3/10

Ricky Music is the fourth studio album by American band Porches. It was released on March 13, 2020 under Domino Records.

== Critical reception ==
Ricky Music was met with generally favorable reviews from critics. At Metacritic, which assigns a weighted average rating out of 100 to reviews from mainstream publications, this release received an average score of 69, based on 10 reviews.

== Track listing ==
Ricky Music track listing
No.	Title	Length
1.	"Patience"	2:31
2.	"Do U Wanna"	2:42
3.	"Lipstick Song"	2:57
4.	"PFB"	0:33
5.	"I Wanna Ride"	2:47
6.	"Madonna"	3:13
7.	"I Can't Even Think"	2:50
8.	"Hair"	2:06
9.	"Fuck_3"	2:44
10.	"Wrote Some Songs"	1:15

iTunes Bonus Track
No.	Title	Length
11.	"Rangerover"	2:15
