= Gabriela Alemán =

Ecuadorian writer

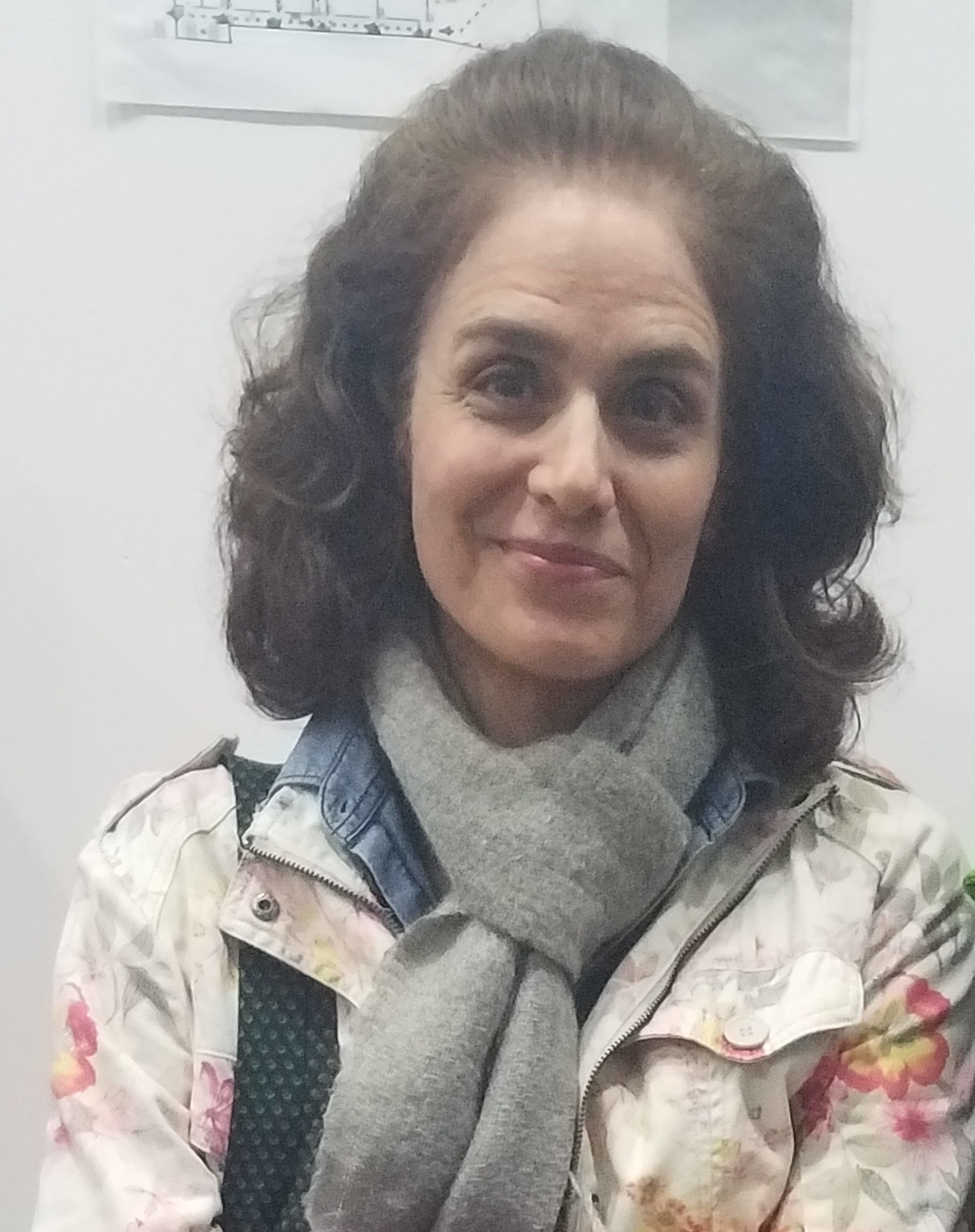
- Born: September 30, 1968 (age 57); Rio de Janeiro, Brazil
- Education: University of Cambridge; Andina Simón Bolívar (MA); Tulane University
- Occupations: Writer, educator
- Awards: Guggenheim Fellowship (2006)

Gabriela Alemán (born September 30, 1968, in Rio de Janeiro) is a Brazilian-born Ecuadorian writer and educator, whose work has been translated into multiple languages.

== Biography ==
Born to Ecuadorian parents in Rio de Janeiro, Brazil, she lived in several countries in her youth until she settled in Quito, Ecuador.

Alemán studied translation at University of Cambridge, received a master's in Latin American Literature at Andina Simón Bolívar (in Ecuador), and obtained a doctorate at Tulane University in New Orleans, U.S.. She was awarded the Guggenheim fellowship in the film, video and radio studies on 2006.

She was a professional basketball player in Switzerland and Paraguay and worked as waiter, manager, translator, radio scriptwriter, director assistant, editor, proofreader and journalist.

She has been a professor at Universidad San Francisco de Quito and in Tulane.

=== Literary career ===
In 1993 she represented Ecuador at Encuentro de Jóvenes Escritores Literatura y Compromiso, that included the participation of Jorge Amado, José Saramago, Juan José Arreola, Wole Soyinka, Ana Matute, and others.

In 2014 Alemán won the first place CIESPAL de Crónica award, for her article "Los limones del huerto de Elisabeth", and the Joaquín Gallegos Lara award, for her book of stories "La Muerte Silba un Blues" in 2014.

The author was a finalist for the Premio Hispanoamericano del Cuento Gabriel García Márquez in 2015, together with four other writers from Latin America. The award is known as one of the most important narrative awards in Spanish and 136 books published in 2014 were nominated and authors from 19 countries participated.

In 2003 she released her first novel, Body Time, under the Planeta Editorial. She also cultivates the essay and the chronicle; she has ventured into dramaturgy (screenwriter of Puertas adentro for UNICEF) and on the radio (script for the series Salomé Gutiérrez, former private detective, broadcast by Onda Verde in Madrid and by Radio La Luna in Quito).

Her novel Smoke, a story set told in Paraguay, in which the characters are real, forgotten in history after the dictatorship of Alfredo Stroessner. The novel focuses on power, politics and its consequences in society, was released in 2017.

After the publication of Poso Wells, her second novel, in its English edition by City Lights, Alemán's work has received attention in the main cultural magazines of the United States: The Paris Review, The New Yorker, and Los Angeles Review of Books have published commentaries and interviews about the novel.

== Honors ==
The New York Times mentions Alemán's book Humo in their article, "Fiction Books of 2017: An Ibero-American Selection."

In 2015, she was a finalist along with four others for the Gabriel García Márquez Short Story Award, considered one of the most important narrative awards in Spanish.

She was selected by the Hay Festival and Bogotá Capital Mundial del Libro as one of the most important 39 Latin-American writers under the age of 39 in 2007.

In 2006, she received a Guggenheim Fellowship for her work.

== Works ==
=== Works in English ===
- Poso Wells, San Francisco : City Lights Publishers, 2018. ISBN 9780872867550, OCLC 1049575983
- Family Album: Stories (City Lights Publishers, 2022) ISBN 9780872868823

=== Stories ===
- En el país rosado, Exlibris, 1994
- Maldito corazón, El Conejo, 1996
- Zoom, Eskeletra, 1997
- Fuga permanente, Euterpe, 2001 (Eskeletra, 2002)
- Álbum de familia, Álbum de familia, Estruendomudo, Lima, 2010 (Panamericana, 2011; Cadáver Exquisito, 2012) (City Lights, translated by Dick Cluster & Mary Ellen Fieweger)
- La muerte silba un blues, Literatura Random House, 2014

=== Novels ===
- Body time, Planeta, 2003
- Poso Wells, Eskeletra, 2007 (Aristas Martínez, 2012) (City Lights, translated by Dick Cluster, 2018)
- Humo, Literatura Random House, Bogotá, 2017

=== Theater ===
- La acróbata del hambre, 1997

=== Essays ===
- Cine en construcción: largometrajes ecuatorianos de ficción 1924-2004, 2004
