= Violet Ranney Lang =

American poet

Violet Ranney "Bunny" Lang (married name Phillips, May 11, 1924 – July 29, 1956) was an American poet and playwright. She was a co-founder of the Poet's Theatre in Cambridge, Massachusetts, and a friend of several noteworthy writers of the New York School, especially Frank O'Hara.

== Biography ==
Violet Ranney Lang was born into a wealthy Boston family, the youngest of six daughters of Malcolm and Ethel Lang, who raised their family at 209 Bay State Road. Her father was Malcolm Burrage Lang (1881–1972), a 1902 Harvard graduate who was an organist and director of music at King's Chapel, Boston. Her mother was Ethel Ranney Lang, whose father Fletcher Ranney was a Boston lawyer.

She attended Hannah More Academy in Maryland. A debutante, she entered the University of Chicago in 1942, but remained only a few semesters to join the war effort. Too young for US military service, she joined the Canadian Women's Army Corps. After the war, she returned briefly to school and was an editor for the Chicago Review (founded in 1946).

By 1950, Lang had returned to Cambridge, Massachusetts, where she became a friend of Frank O'Hara. For a brief time in 1951 she performed as a dancer at the Old Howard burlesque house in Boston. Among the poets of the New York School, she was a close friend to Frank O'Hara, John Ashberry, and Kenneth Koch. She picked up Gregory Corso on the streets of New York City and persuaded her friends in Cambridge to help him live on the floor of a dorm room in Harvard's Eliot House.

Lang was a founding member of the Poets’ Theatre, established in Cambridge, Massachusetts, in 1950, and took on many assignments in its productions. As part of the Theatre's opening night, she directed O'Hara's Try! Try!. For the premiere of her play Fire Exit, she directed, acted, and designed the sets and costumes, while handling publicity, music, and lighting. Anthony Lane deems it "a careful comedy, touched with pathos". It has been described as "a protofeminist rewrite of the myth of Orpheus and Eurydice, set in a burlesque house in New Jersey". It concludes with Eurydice rejecting Orpheus in favor of an independent life. According to one assessment, Fire Exit is "marred by a peculiar alternation between an unfamiliar hillbilly dialect and the strained grandeur of the classical allusions" but has "moments of triumph that suggest a talent which had no chance to unfold".

Her other play I Too Have Lived in Arcadia (1954) drew upon her love affair with the painter Michael Goldberg. It too premiered at the Poets' Theatre. Reviewing a 1980 performance, Frank Rich wrote: "Though it has flashes of feminist insight and a trance- like ice-age atmosphere, a little of its heart-on-sleeve bitterness and paleontological imagery can go a long way."

In April 1955 Lang married Bradley Sawyer Phillips (1929–1991), a painter, at Christ Church in Cambridge.

She died of Hodgkin's disease at age 32 and was buried in the family plot in Mt. Auburn Cemetery following a funeral service at Christ Church.

Frank O'Hara wrote a series of poems from 1956 to 1959 in mourning her death.

Lang's papers, including manuscripts and drafts as well as correspondence, are held at Harvard University's Houghton Library.

== Publication history ==
During her lifetime, Lang published some of her poems in Poetry: A Magazine of Verse and in a variety of literary journals. After her death, her widower Bradley Sawyer Phillips served as her literary executor. Working with several advisers, he selected and edited a volume of Lang's work that he self-published in 1962 as The Pitch. It contained 48 poems and the texts of her two plays. The cover was designed by Edward Gorey. Alison Lurie wrote a memoir of Lang, which was published privately in Munich 1959, which Random House then combined with the works found in The Pitch into a single volume titled V.R. Lang: Poems & Plays with a Memoir by Alison Lurie that appeared in 1975.

The Miraculous Season: Selected Poems, edited by Rosa Campbell and credited to V.R. "Bunny" Lang, was published in the UK in 2024. A US edition is scheduled for 2026.
