= Lunch Poems =

1964 Book by Frank O'Hara

First edition

Lunch Poems is a book of poetry by Frank O'Hara published in 1964 by Lawrence Ferlinghetti’s City Lights, number 19 in their Pocket Poets series. The collection was commissioned by Ferlinghetti as early as 1959, but O'Hara delayed in completing it. Ferlinghetti would badger O'Hara with questions like, "How about lunch? I'm hungry." "Cooking", O'Hara would reply. O'Hara enlisted the help of Donald Allen who had published O'Hara's poems in New American Poetry in 1960. Allen says in his introduction to The Collected Poems of Frank O’Hara, “Between 1960 and 1964 O’Hara and I worked intermittently at compiling Lunch Poems, which in the end became a selection of work dating from 1953 to 1964.”

The poems in this collection contain O'Hara's characteristically breezy tone, containing spontaneous reactions to things happening in the moment. Many of them appear to have been written on O'Hara's lunch hour. The poems contain numerous references to pop culture and literary figures, New York locations, and O'Hara's friends. One common theme is a desire for personal connection, whether the one on one connection of two friends or two lovers or a broader connection to strangers, in the face of tragedy, for example. The following are examples of this:

“A Step Away From Them” begins, “It’s my lunch hour, so I go / for a walk among the hum-colored / cabs.” He references Edwin Denby, Federico Fellini, the Armory Show, and Pierre Reverdy, and New York locations like Juliet’s Corner and the Manhattan Storage Warehouse. He talks about his friends Jackson Pollock, John Latouche, and Bunny Lang who have died and says, “Is the earth as full as life was full, of them?”

“The Day Lady Died” begins, “It is 12:20 in New York a Friday / three days after Bastille day, yes / it is 1959 and I go get a shoeshine.” In the poem, he references Paul Verlaine, New World Writing, Brendan Behan, Jean Genet’s plays The Balcony and The Blacks and New York locations like the Golden Griffin and the Ziegfeld Theatre. At the end of the poem, he discovers that Billie Holiday is dead and remembers having heard her sing, recalling that “she whispered a song along the keyboard / and everyone and I stopped breathing.”

“Personal Poem” begins, “Now when I walk around at lunchtime / I have only two charms in my pocket.” It is about O’Hara’s conversation with LeRoi Jones about Miles Davis, Lionel Trilling, Henry James, and Herman Melville. At the end, he says, “I wonder if one person out of the 8,000,000 is thinking of me.”

A 50th Anniversary Edition of Lunch Poems was released in 2014 (City Lights Publishers.)
