= Frank O'Hara =

American poet, art critic and writer

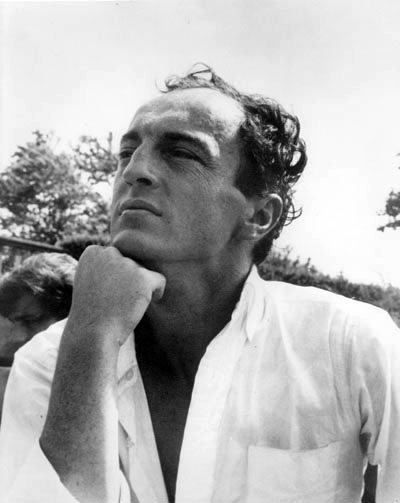
- Born: March 27, 1926; Baltimore, Maryland, U.S.
- Died: July 25, 1966 (aged 40); Mastic Beach, New York, U.S.
- Resting place: Green River Cemetery, Springs, New York, U.S.
- Education: Harvard University (AB); University of Michigan (MA)
- Occupations: Poet, art curator
- Writing career
- Notable work: Lunch Poems
- Movement: The New York School

Francis Russell O'Hara (March 27, 1926 – July 25, 1966) was an American writer, poet, and art critic. A curator at the Museum of Modern Art, O'Hara became prominent in New York City's art world. O'Hara is regarded as a leading figure in the New York School, an informal group of artists, writers, and musicians who drew inspiration from jazz, surrealism, abstract expressionism, action painting, and contemporary avant-garde art movements.

O'Hara's poetry is personal in tone and content, and has been described as sounding "like entries in a diary". Poet and critic Mark Doty has said O'Hara's poetry is "urbane, ironic, sometimes genuinely celebratory and often wildly funny" containing "material and associations alien to academic verse" such as "the camp icons of movie stars of the twenties and thirties, the daily landscape of social activity in Manhattan, jazz music, telephone calls from friends". O'Hara sought to capture in his poetry the immediacy of life, feeling that poetry should be "between two persons instead of two pages."

The Collected Poems of Frank O'Hara edited by Donald Allen (Knopf, 1971), the first of several posthumous collections, shared the 1972 National Book Award for Poetry. Brad Gooch's City Poet is the first substantial biography on O'Hara.

== Early life and education ==
O'Hara in his Harvard University yearbook photo (1950)

Frank O'Hara, the son of Russell Joseph O'Hara and Katherine (née Broderick), was born on March 27, 1926, at Maryland General Hospital, Baltimore and grew up in Grafton, Massachusetts. He attended St. John's High School. He grew up believing his birthday was in June, when, in fact, he had been born in March—as his parents disguised his true date of birth because he had been conceived out of wedlock. He studied piano at the New England Conservatory in Boston from 1941 to 1944 and served in the U.S. Navy in the South Pacific and Japan as a sonarman on the destroyer USS Nicholas during World War II.

With the funding made available to veterans he attended Harvard College, where artist and writer Edward Gorey was his roommate. O'Hara was heavily influenced by visual art and by contemporary music, which was his first love (he remained a fine piano player all his life and would shock new partners by suddenly playing music by Sergei Rachmaninoff when visiting them). His favorite poets were Pierre Reverdy, Arthur Rimbaud, Stéphane Mallarmé, Boris Pasternak, and Vladimir Mayakovsky. While at Harvard, O'Hara met John Ashbery and began publishing poems in the Harvard Advocate. Despite his love of music, O'Hara changed his major and graduated from Harvard in 1950 with a degree in English.

He then attended the University of Michigan in Ann Arbor, where he won a Hopwood Award and, in 1951, received a master's degree in English.

== Early career ==
In the autumn of 1951, O'Hara moved into an apartment in New York City with Joe LeSueur, who was his roommate and sometime lover for the next 11 years. It was during this time that he began teaching at The New School.

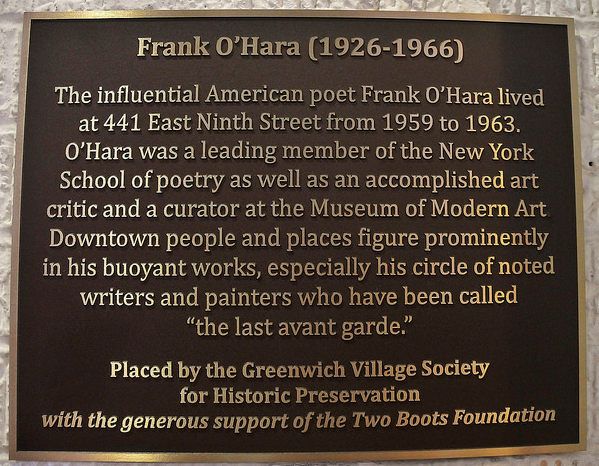
Historic Plaque at 441 East 9th Street where Frank O'Hara lived unveiled by Greenwich Village Society for Historic Preservation on June 10, 2014

O'Hara was active in the art world, working as a reviewer for ARTnews, and in 1960 was assistant curator of painting and sculpture exhibitions for the Museum of Modern Art. He was a friend of the artists Norman Bluhm, Mike Goldberg, Grace Hartigan, Alex Katz, Willem de Kooning, Joan Mitchell, and Larry Rivers.

== Poetry ==
While O'Hara's poetry is generally autobiographical, it tends to make observations about his life in New York, rather than exploring his past. In his introduction to The Collected Poems of Frank O'Hara, Donald Allen says, "that Frank O'Hara tended to think of his poems as a record of his life is apparent in much of his work." O'Hara discussed this aspect of his poetry in a statement for Donald Allen's The New American Poetry:

What is happening to me, allowing for lies and exaggerations which I try to avoid, goes into my poems. I don't think my experiences are clarified or made beautiful for myself or anyone else, they are just there in whatever form I can find them. . .My formal "stance" is found at the crossroads where what I know and can't get meets what is left of that I know and can bear without hatred. . .It may be that poetry makes life's nebulous events tangible to me and restores their detail; or conversely that poetry brings forth the intangible quality of incidents which are all too concrete and circumstantial. Or each on specific occasions, or both all the time.

His initial time in the Navy, during his basic training at Sampson Naval Training Center, in upstate New York, along with earlier years at St. John's High School, began to shape a distinguished style of solitary observation that would later inform his poems. Immersion in regimented daily routine, first at Catholic school, then in the Navy, enabled him to separate himself from situations and make witty, often singularly perceptive commentary. Sometimes he cataloged it for use in later writing, or, perhaps more often, put it into letters. This skill at scrutinizing and recording amid the bustle and churn of daily life would later be one of the important aspects that shaped O'Hara as an urban poet, writing off the cuff.

Among his friends, O'Hara was known to treat poetry dismissively, as something to be done only in the moment. John Ashbery says he witnessed O'Hara "Dashing poems off at odd moments—in his office at the Museum of Modern Art, in the street at lunchtime, or even in a room full of people—he would then put them away in drawers and cartons and half forget them."

In the summer of 1951, O'Hara read a manifesto in The Kenyon Review written by the poet, novelist and anarchistic social critic Paul Goodman. In the essay, Goodman argues that the postwar American "advanced guard" writers must articulate the deep-seated, personal disquiet felt across the culture but left unvoiced. The essay encouraged O'Hara to write poetry that was embarrassing in its directness, and even seen as hostile to literary standards then in place. O'Hara's poetry began to erase poetry's cautious border between what is public and what is private.

In 1959, he wrote a mock manifesto (originally published in the magazine Yūgen in 1961) called Personism: A Manifesto, in which he explains his position on formal structure: "I don't ... like rhythm, assonance, all that stuff. You just go on your nerve. If someone's chasing you down the street with a knife you just run, you don't turn around and shout, 'Give it up! I was a track star for Mineola Prep.'" He says, in response to academic overemphasis on form, "As for measure and other technical apparatus, that's just common sense: if you're going to buy a pair of pants you want them to be tight enough so everyone will want to go to bed with you. There's nothing metaphysical about it." He claims that on August 27, 1959, while talking to LeRoi Jones, he founded a movement called Personism which may be "the death of literature as we know it."

He says,

It does not have to do with personality or intimacy, far from it! But to give you a vague idea, one of its minimal aspects is to address itself to one person (other than the poet himself), thus evoking overtones of love without destroying love's life-giving vulgarity, and sustaining the poet's feelings toward the poem while preventing love from distracting him into feeling about the person.

His poetry shows the influence of abstract expressionism, surrealism, Russian poetry, and poets associated with French symbolism. Ashbery says, "The poetry that meant the most to him when he began writing was either French – Rimbaud, Mallarmé, the Surrealists: poets who speak the language of every day into the reader's dream – or Russian – Pasternak and especially Mayakovsky, for whom he picked up what James Schuyler has called the 'intimate yell.'" As part of the New York School of poetry, O'Hara to some degree encapsulated the compositional philosophy of New York School painters.

Ashbery says, "Frank O'Hara's concept of the poem as the chronicle of the creative act that produces it was strengthened by his intimate experience of Pollock's, Kline's, and de Kooning's great paintings of the late '40s and early '50s and of the imaginative realism of painters like Jane Freilicher and Larry Rivers."

O'Hara was also influenced by William Carlos Williams, so much so that he lists Williams (along with Hart Crane and Walt Whitman) as one of three poets who were "better than the movies." According to Marjorie Perloff in her book Frank O'Hara, Poet among Painters, he and Williams both use everyday language and simple statements split at irregular intervals. Perloff points out the similarities between O'Hara's "Autobiographia Literaria" and Williams's "Invocation and Conclusion". At the end of "Autobiographia Literaria", the speaker says, "And here I am, the/center of all beauty!/writing these poems!/Imagine!" Similarly, Williams at the end of "Invocation and Conclusion" says, "Now look at me!" These lines show a shared interest in the self as an individual who can only be himself in isolation. A similar idea is expressed in a line from Williams's "Danse Russe": "Who shall say I am not/ the happy genius of my household?"

== Personal life ==
Frank O'Hara, who was gay, met Joe LeSueur in 1951, and the two maintained a relationship until 1965, living together on and off from 1955 to 1965.

From 1959 to 1963, the two lived at 441 East 9th Street in the East Village. Known throughout his life for his extreme sociability, passion, and warmth, O'Hara had hundreds of friends and lovers throughout his life, many from the New York art and poetry worlds. Soon after arriving in New York, he was employed at the Museum of Modern Art, selling postcards at the admissions desk, and began to write seriously.

O'Hara met longtime partner Vincent Warren in the summer of 1959. Warren, a Canadian ballet dancer, was the inspiration for several of O'Hara's poems, including "Poem (A la Recherche d'Gertrude Stein)", "Les Luths", "Poem (So many echoes in my head)", and "Having a Coke with You". Warren died on October 25, 2017, 51 years after O'Hara's death.

== Death ==
In the early morning hours of July 24, 1966, O'Hara was struck by a jeep on the Fire Island beach, after the beach taxi in which he had been riding with a group of friends broke down in the dark. He died the next day at age 40 of a ruptured liver at Bayview Hospital in Mastic Beach, Long Island. Attempts to bring negligent homicide charges against the jeep's driver, 23-year-old Kenneth L. Ruzicka, were unsuccessful; many of O'Hara's friends felt the local police had conducted a lax investigation to protect one of their own locals. O'Hara was buried in Green River Cemetery on Long Island. The painter Larry Rivers, a longtime friend and lover, delivered one of the eulogies, along with Bill Berkson, Edwin Denby, and René d'Harnoncourt.

== In popular culture ==
=== In music ===
Morton Feldman composed "For Frank O'Hara" (1973) for 7 instrumentalists.

In First Aid Kit's song "To A Poet", there is the lyric, "But Frank put it best when he said 'you can't plan on the heart'", a reference to O'Hara's poem, "My Heart".

English rock band Martha's song "1967, I Miss You, I'm Lonely" includes the lyrics, "I look at you and I am confident that I'd rather look at you than all the portraits in existence in the world, except possibly O'Hara by Grace Hartigan," a reference to both O'Hara's poem, "Having a Coke with You", and Grace Hartigan's portrait of O'Hara.

Rilo Kiley's 2004 album More Adventurous is titled after a line in O'Hara's poem "Meditations in an Emergency"; "Each time my heart is broken it makes me feel more adventurous..." The title track references the same line: "I read with every broken heart, we should become more adventurous".

Frankie Cosmos's music is influenced by O'Hara's works, visible in two of her albums, Zentropy and Next Thing. Greta Kline has stated that her stage name derived from the poet.

The song "Frank O'Hara" by the band Sea Wolf (band) describes a relationship with the poet.

New Jackson's song "Having a Coke With You" is named after the poem and features the full spoken poem.

=== In film ===
In the 2011 film Beastly, the lovestruck main characters read O'Hara's poem "Having a Coke with You" aloud to each other.

=== In literature ===
O'Hara is a minor character in William Boyd's 2002 novel Any Human Heart.

O'Hara's Lunch Poems is the basis of Paul Legault's Lunch Poems 2.

=== In television ===
In the season 1 episode of the HBO series Bored to Death, "The Case of the Missing Screenplay", the main character loses a screenplay written by Jim Jarmusch about the life of Frank O'Hara.

In the last episode of the series Normal People, based on Sally Rooney's novel of the same name, Connell's gift for Marianne's birthday is said to be a collection of Frank O'Hara's poetry.

Several episodes of Mad Men (season 2) reference O'Hara's collection of poetry, Meditations in an Emergency. The first episode shows a character reading from it over lunch in a bar (recalling O'Hara's 1964 collection Lunch Poems) as does the last episode, which uses the book's title as its episode title. In the twelfth episode, Don Draper finds his copy of Meditations in an Emergency in Anna Draper's home in California.

=== In plays ===
The poetry of Frank O'Hara features prominently in Rachel Bonds's 2017 play At the Old Place.

=== Landmarks ===
On June 10, 2014, a plaque was unveiled outside one of O'Hara's New York City residences, at 441 East Ninth Street. Poets Tony Towle, who inherited the apartment from O'Hara, and Edmund Berrigan read his works at the event.

== Bibliography ==
- Works by Frank O'Hara at Open Library

=== Books published during his lifetime ===
- A City Winter and Other Poems. Two Drawings by Larry Rivers. (New York: Tibor de Nagy Gallery Editions, 1951 [sic, i.e. 1952])
- Oranges: 12 pastorals. (New York: Tibor de Nagy Gallery Editions, 1953; New York: Angel Hair Books, 1969)
- Meditations in an Emergency. (New York: Grove Press, 1957; 1967)
- Second Avenue. Cover drawing by Larry Rivers. (New York: Totem Press in Association with Corinth Books, 1960)
- Odes. Prints by Michael Goldberg. (New York: Tiber Press, 1960)
- Lunch Poems. (San Francisco, CA: City Lights Books, The Pocket Poets Series (No. 19), 1964)
- Love Poems (Tentative Title). (New York: Tibor de Nagy Gallery Editions, 1965)

=== Posthumous works ===
- In Memory of My Feelings, commemorative volume illustrated by 30 U.S. artists and edited by Bill Berkson (New York: The Museum of Modern Art, 1967)
- The Collected Poems of Frank O'Hara. Edited by Donald Allen with an introduction by John Ashbery (1st ed. New York: Knopf, 1971; Berkeley: University of California Press, 1995) —shared the National Book Award with Howard Moss, Selected Poems
- The Selected Poems of Frank O'Hara. Edited by Donald Allen (New York: Knopf, 1974; Vintage Books, 1974)
- Standing Still and Walking in New York. Edited by Donald Allen (Bolinas, Calif: Grey Fox Press; Berkeley, Calif: distributed by Bookpeople, 1975)
- Early Writing. Edited by Donald Allen (Bolinas, Calif: Grey Fox; Berkeley: distributed by Bookpeople, 1977)
- Poems Retrieved. Edited by Donald Allen (Bolinas, Calif: Grey Fox Press; Berkeley, Calif: distributed by Bookpeople, 1977)
- Selected Plays. Edited by Ron Padgett, Joan Simon, and Anne Waldman (1st ed. New York: Full Court Press, 1978)
- Amorous Nightmares of Delay: Selected Plays. (Baltimore, MD: Johns Hopkins University Press, 1997)
- Selected Poems. Edited by Mark Ford (New York: Knopf, 2008)
- Poems Retrieved (City Lights, 2013)
- Lunch Poems. 50th Anniversary Edition (City Lights, 2014)

=== Exhibitions and writings on art ===
- Jackson Pollock. (New York: George Braziller, Inc. 1959)
- New Spanish painting and sculpture. (New York: The Museum of Modern Art, 1960)
- Robert Motherwell: with selections from the artist's writings. by Frank O'Hara (New York: The Museum of Modern Art, 1965)
- Nakian. (New York: The Museum of Modern Art, 1966)
- Art Chronicles, 1954–1966. (New York: G. Braziller, 1975)

=== On O'Hara ===
- Frank O'Hara: Poet Among Painters by Marjorie Perloff (New York: G. Braziller, 1977; 1st paperback ed. Austin: University of Texas Press, 1979; Chicago, IL: University of Chicago Press, with a new introduction, 1998)
- Frank O'Hara by Alan Feldman (Boston: Twayne Publishers, 1979 ... frontispiece photo of Frank O'Hara c. by Richard Moore)
- Frank O'Hara: A Comprehensive Bibliography by Alexander Smith Jr. (New York: Garland, 1979; 2nd print. corrected, 1980)
- Homage to Frank O'Hara. edited by Bill Berkson and Joe LeSueur, cover by Jane Freilicher (originally published as Big Sky 11/12 in April, 1978; rev. ed. Berkeley: Creative Arts Book Company, 1980)
- Art with the touch of a poet: Frank O'Hara. exhibit companion compiled by Hildegard Cummings (Storrs, Conn. : The William Benton Museum of Art, University of Connecticut, 1983 ... January 24-March 13, 1983)
- Frank O'Hara: To Be True To A City edited by Jim Elledge (Ann Arbor: University of Michigan Press, 1990)
- City Poet: The Life and Times of Frank O'Hara by Brad Gooch (1st ed. New York: Knopf, 1993; New York: HarperPerennial, 1994)
- In Memory of My Feelings: Frank O'Hara and American Art by Russell Ferguson (Los Angeles: The Museum of Contemporary Art, Los Angeles / University of California Press, 1999)
- Hyperscapes in the Poetry of Frank O'Hara: Difference, Homosexuality, Topography by Hazel Smith (Liverpool University Press, Liverpool, 2000)
- Digressions on Some Poems by Frank O'Hara by Joe LeSueur (New York: Farrar, Straus and Giroux, 2003).
- Frank O'Hara: The Poetics of Coterie by Lytle Shaw (Iowa City: University of Iowa Press, 2006)
- Also a Poet: Frank O'Hara, My Father, and Me by Ada Calhoun (New York: Grove Press, 2022)

== Painting ==
- Alice Neel, Frank O'Hara, (1960), 85.7 x 40.6 x 2.5 cm, National Portrait Gallery, Smithsonian Institution
- Larry Rivers, O'Hara Nude with Boots (1954), 97" x 53", Larry Rivers Foundation
- Jasper Johns, In Memory of My Feelings - Frank O'Hara (1961), 40 1/4" x 60", MCA, Chicago
- Wynn Chamberlain, Poets (Clothed), Poets (Naked), (1964), Earl McGrath collection.
- Alfred Leslie, a link to The Death Cycle, (1966), - The Death of Frank O'Hara Alfred Leslie's The Killing Cycle
- Grace Hartigan, Frank O'Hara, 1926-1966, (1966), 80 1/8 x 80 in. (203.4 x 203.2 cm), Smithsonian American Art Museum, Gift of Grace Hartigan.

== See also ==
- LGBT culture in New York City
- List of LGBT people from New York City
