= Inner World Peace =

- Cover to the standard edition; the deluxe edition has the same art, but blue-tinted

Studio album by Frankie Cosmos
- Released: October 21, 2022
- Genre: Indie pop
- Length: 36:38
- Language: English
- Label: Sub Pop
- Producer: Alex Bailey; Greta Kline; Lauren Martin; Nate Mendelsohn; Luke Pyenson; Katie Von Schleicher

Frankie Cosmos chronology
Close It Quietly (2019)	Inner World Peace (2022)	Different Talking (2025)

Inner World Peace is a 2022 studio album by American indie pop musical act Frankie Cosmos. It has received positive reviews from critics.

== Reception ==
Inner World Peace received positive reviews from critics noted at review aggregator Metacritic. It has a weighted average score of 73 out of 100, based on four reviews. Editors at AllMusic Guide rated this album 3.5 out of five stars, with critic Marcy Donelson noting that "the songs here are still short and bittersweet and still distinctly Frankie Cosmos, but there's a little less bounce in their gait and more weight to them on the whole, as [lead vocalist and songwriter Greta] Kline negotiates self-examination, affection, regret, and apprehension". This release was shortlisted by The Fader. Writing for Gigwise, Grace Dodd rated Inner World Peace an eight out of 10, considering that it "feels like a whole, complete, cohesive project" and summing up that the "band’s unique sound of breezy guitar-rock paired with simply beautiful, intimate lyrics make this album truly feel as though it was shaped by a delicate hand". Nina Corcoran of Pitchfork rated this release 7.6 out of 10, noting that Greta Kline's songwriting has matured as she was "now entering a phase of tenured inquisitiveness, where no stone goes unturned in the search to understand why she is who she is"; she also favorably compares the music to Stereolab. Chlo Spinks of The Skinny rated Inner World Peace three out of five stars, writing that it "absolutely become a comfort album for many". Writing for Under the Radar, Alex Nguyen gave this album a 6.5 out of 10, noting that the band "balances Kline’s poetic lyricism with a sturdy indie pop foundation", but complaining that "the band’s attempts to diversify their sound often fall short of growing out of their repetitive riffs, leading many of the tracks to blend together in a pleasant but rather predictable experience".

== Track listing ==
All songs written by Alex Bailey, Greta Kline, Lauren Martin, and Luke Pyenson

1. "Abigail" – 1:53
2. "Aftershook" – 3:25
3. "Fruit Stand" – 1:58
4. "Magnetic Personality" – 1:39
5. "Wayne" – 1:57
6. "Sky Magnet" – 2:33
7. "A Work Call" – 3:01
8. "Empty Head" – 5:13
9. "Fragments" – 2:55
10. "Prolonging Babyhood" – 1:41
11. "One Year Stand" – 2:35
12. "F.O.O.F." – 2:08
13. "Street View" – 1:58
14. "Spare the Guitar" – 2:10
15. "Heed the Call" – 1:32

Clean Weird Prone deluxe edition bonus tracks

1. "one year stand" (Alex moodboard) – 2:37
2. "empty head" (demo) – 2:31
3. "aftershook" (demo) – 1:26
4. "i'm not worried – 0:52
5. "hey whatsup" – 1:29
6. "fragments" (demo) – 1:46
7. "sky magnet" (Alex demo) – 2:09
8. "a work call" (demo) – 1:38
9. "wayne" (demo) – 2:05
10. "must be nice" (single tear) – 3:47

== Personnel ==
Frankie Cosmos

- Alex Bailey – bass guitar, arrangement, production
- Greta Kline – vocals, guitar, arrangement, production
- Lauren Martin – keyboards, arrangement, production, artwork
- Luke Pyenson – drums, arrangement, production

Additional personnel

- Josh Bonati – mastering
- Nate Mendelsohn – saxophone, synthesizer bass, engineering, mixing, production
- Lauren Martin – album art
- Dusty Summers – additional design
- Katie von Schleicher – Mellotron, strings, engineering, mixing, production

== See also ==
- Lists of 2022 albums
