= Next Thing =

Studio album by Frankie Cosmos
- Released: April 1, 2016
- Genre: Indie pop
- Length: 28:28
- Label: Bayonet Records
- Producer: Hunter Davidsohn

Frankie Cosmos chronology
Fit Me In (2015)	Next Thing (2016)	Vessel (2018)

Singles from Next Thing
- 1. "Outside with the Cuties" Released: January 19, 2016; 2. "Sinister" Released: January 27, 2016; 3. "Is It Possible/Sleep Song" Released: February 23, 2016; 4. "On the Lips" Released: March 11, 2016

Next Thing is the second studio album by Frankie Cosmos, the stage name of American singer-songwriter Greta Kline, released on April 1, 2016, on Bayonet Records.

== Critical reception ==
Professional ratings
Aggregate scores
Source	Rating
AnyDecentMusic?	7.3/10
Metacritic	78/100
Review scores
Source	Rating
AllMusic	4/5 stars
Clash	8/10
Consequence of Sound	B+
DIY	4/5 stars
Exclaim!	6/10
Mojo	3/5 stars
Pitchfork	8.5/10
Record Collector	4/5 stars
Rolling Stone	3.5/5 stars
Spin	8/10

At Metacritic, which assigns a normalized rating out of 100 to reviews from mainstream critics, the album received an average score of 78, based on 17 reviews, which indicates "generally favorable reviews".

Kevin Lozano of Pitchfork praised the album stating, "Her greatest talent remains her ability to transform minute-long songs into experiences that resemble hours of intimate and impressionistic conversation." Lozano continues, "Many of the songs ("Embody," "On the Lips," "Too Dark" and "Sleep Song") on the album have appeared in acoustic permutations in past work, and they make the leap seamlessly. Each are marvelously well-wrought trains of thought, cramming existential questions into the banality of everyday moments and finding something beatific even in the plainest of things."

=== Accolades ===
Publication	Accolade	Year	Rank
Consequence of Sound	Top 50 Albums of 2016	2016	28
Paste	The 50 Best Albums of 2016	2016	29
Pitchfork	The 50 Best Albums of 2016	2016	48
The Skinny	Top 50 Albums of 2016	2016	26
Stereogum	The 50 Best Albums of 2016	2016	44

== Track listing ==
All tracks are written by Greta Kline.

No.	Title	Length
1.	"Floated In"	1:22
2.	"If I Had a Dog"	1:28
3.	"Fool"	2:04
4.	"Embody"	1:49
5.	"Too Dark"	2:43
6.	"Tour Good"	1:25
7.	"Interlude"	0:45
8.	"I'm 20"	1:36
9.	"On the Lips"	1:49
10.	"Sinister"	2:10
11.	"Is It Possible/Sleep Song"	2:30
12.	"Outside with the Cuties"	2:34
13.	"Sappho"	1:52
14.	"What If"	2:22
15.	"O Dreaded C Town"	1:59
Total length:		28:28

== Personnel ==
- Greta Kline – performing, lead vocals
- Aaron Maine – performing
- David Maine – performing
- Gabrielle Smith – performing
- Hunter Davidsohn – performing
- Meredith Wilson – artwork

== Charts ==
Chart (2016)	Peak position
US Heatseekers Albums (Billboard)	13
US Independent Albums (Billboard)	40
