= The House (Porches album) =

Studio album by Porches
- Released: January 19, 2018
- Genre: Synth-pop
- Label: Domino
- Producer: Aaron Maine

Porches chronology
Pool (2016)	The House (2018)	Ricky Music (2020)

Professional ratings
Aggregate scores
Source	Rating
AnyDecentMusic?	7/10
Metacritic	69/100
Review scores
Source	Rating
AllMusic	3.5/5 stars
The A.V. Club	C
Drowned in Sound	2/10
The Guardian	3/5 stars
Mojo	3/5 stars
NME	8/10
The Observer	4/5 stars
Pitchfork	6.4/10
Uncut	7/10

The House is the third studio album released under the Porches project, led by New York-based musician Aaron Maine. The album was released on January 19, 2018, on Domino Records. The album has features from (Sandy) Alex G, Dev Hynes, Bryndon Cook, Okay Kaya, Maya Laner, Cameron Wisch, and Peter Maine, Aaron Maine's father.

The album's first single was "Country", released on October 11, 2017. The album's second single, "Find Me", was released on October 24, 2017.

== Track listing ==
All tracks are written by Aaron Maine, except "Understanding" by Peter Maine.

No.	Title	Length
1.	"Leave the House"	2:11
2.	"Find Me"	3:47
3.	"Understanding"	0:59
4.	"Now the Water"	3:48
5.	"Country"	1:52
6.	"By My Side"	3:12
7.	"Åkeren"	1:48
8.	"Anymore"	3:21
9.	"Wobble"	2:04
10.	"Goodbye"	2:46
11.	"Swimmer"	0:52
12.	"W Longing"	4:26
13.	"Ono"	3:39
14.	"Anything U Want"	2:36

== Charts ==
Chart (2018)	Peak position
US Heatseekers Albums (Billboard)	11
US Independent Albums (Billboard)	28
