= Zentropy =

Studio album by Frankie Cosmos
- Released: March 4, 2014
- Studio: The Business District, Johnson City, New York, United States
- Genre: Indie pop
- Length: 17:16
- Language: English
- Label: Double Double Whammy
- Producer: Hunter Davidsohn

Frankie Cosmos chronology
Zentropy (2014)	Fit Me In (2015)

Zentropy is the debut album from American indie rock act Frankie Cosmos.

== Reception ==
Editors at AllMusic Guide rated this release 4.5 out of five stars, declaring it an Album Pick, with critic Fred Thomas calling it "an impossibly rare instance of unabashedly twee songs that transcend self-consciousness and overstated humility to connect with visceral emotional currents" that "is astonishingly complete, communicating enormous ideas effortlessly and approaching perfection with its 27 minutes". Writing for Pitchfork, Mike Powell rated this release an 8.0 out of 10, calling it "a playful but disciplined album". The publication later ranked Zentropy as the 133rd best album of the 2010s.

== Track listing ==
1. "Art School" – 1:52
2. "Fireman" – 1:06
3. "Birthday Song" – 1:08
4. "Owen" – 2:03
5. "Buses Splash with Rain" – 2:09
6. "Leonie" – 2:27
7. "I Do Too" – 1:17
8. "Dancing in the Public Eye" – 1:46
9. "My I Love You" – 1:32
10. "Sad 2" – 2:02

== Personnel ==
- Frankie Cosmos – vocals, guitar
- Colin Alexander – album art
- Susannah Cutler – internal artwork (vinyl screenprint)
- Chris Daley – mastering assistance
- Hunter Davidsohn – marimba, engineering, mixing, production
- Justin Frost – internal artwork
- Aaron Maine – bass guitar, drums, keyboards
- Jamal Ruhe – mastering
- Gabby Smith – internal artwork (vinyl screenprint)

== See also ==
- List of 2014 albums
