= Greta Kline =

American musician (born 1994)

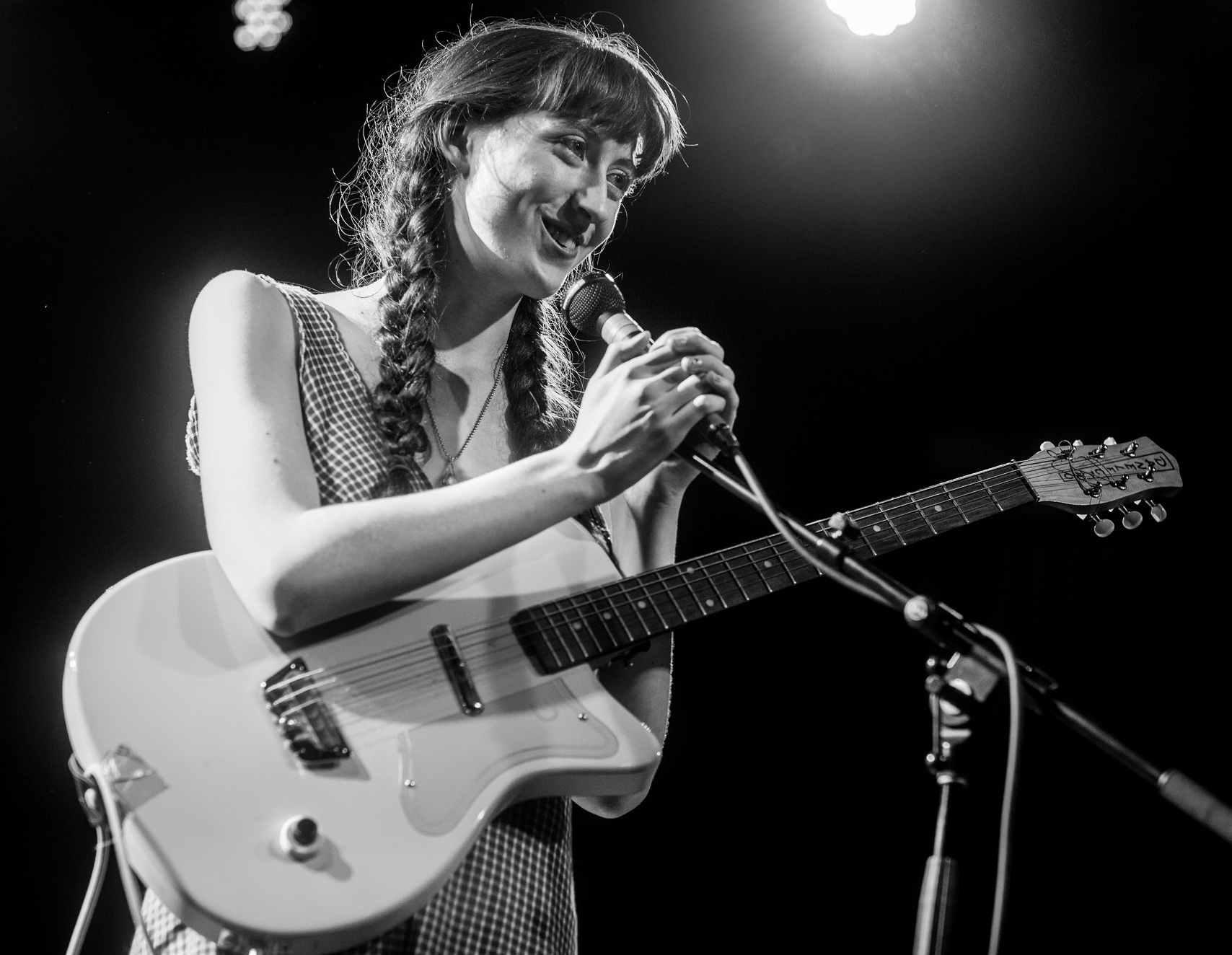
- Performing as Frankie Cosmos in 2014 with Porches

Background information
- Also known as: Frankie Cosmos
- Born: Greta Simone Kline; March 21, 1994 (age 32); New York City, U.S.
- Genres: Indie rock; indie pop; indie folk; lo-fi; bedroom pop
- Occupations: Musician; singer
- Instruments: Vocals; guitar; bass guitar
- Years active: 2011–present
- Labels: Sub Pop; Bayonet; Double Double Whammy
- Website: www.frankiecosmosband.com

Greta Simone Kline (born March 21, 1994), also known by the stage name Frankie Cosmos, is an American musician and singer. She is known for her independent releases, inspired by Frank O'Hara's poetry, DIY ethics of K Records and the early 2000s New York City's anti-folk scene. She is the daughter of actors Kevin Kline and Phoebe Cates. Her former stage name "Frankie Cosmos" is now the name of her band.

== Early life ==
Kline was born on March 21, 1994, in New York City, the daughter of Academy Award-winning actor Kevin Kline and actress Phoebe Cates. Her father is of German-Jewish and Irish descent and her mother has Russian-Jewish and Chinese-Filipino ancestry. She has one older brother, Owen Kline, who is an actor and filmmaker. She is a cousin of fellow singer-songwriter Sophie Cates.

Kline was introduced to music by her family. She settled on guitar as her primary instrument of choice at seventh grade, after playing the piano and briefly the drums. Home-schooled for most of high school, she spent time by attending underground rock shows in New York and getting involved in the Westchester music scene. Kline attended New York University's Gallatin School of Individualized Study for two years, and studied English and/or poetry. Kline found the school to be unaccommodating of her touring schedule, and dropped out.

Kline and her brother Owen both appeared in the films The Anniversary Party (2001) and The Squid and the Whale (2005).

== Career ==
Kline started performing and recording independently under the alias Ingrid Superstar. She released a number of lo-fi recordings mainly under her Bandcamp account. In early 2010s, she was also introduced to the music community of Purchase College, which introduced her to independent Double Double Whammy record label. In late 2011, she started to perform under the alias Frankie Cosmos, a name coined by her now ex-boyfriend Aaron Maine of the band Porches. Maine played drums for Frankie Cosmos and Kline played bass for Porches at one point in time.

In 2014, Kline released her debut studio album as Frankie Cosmos, Zentropy, with her backing band.

Kline released the EP Fit Me In on November 13, 2015, on Bayonet Records. Kline released her second studio album, Next Thing, on April 1, 2016, on Bayonet Records.

On April 12, 2017, Frankie Cosmos announced a slew of tour dates and that they recently had signed to Sub Pop records. They stated around this time that they are working on a new album. On June 9, 2017, Kline opened for IAN SWEET and Girlpool at Warsaw in Brooklyn as part of her new project Lexie. Joined by Warehouse members Alex Bailey and Doug Bleichner, their first release is on Bandcamp and it is called "Record Time!".

In January 2018, Kline released the lead single "Jesse" from the album Vessel. The album was released on March 30, 2018, through Sub Pop records. On March 13, 2019, Kline released "Haunted Items", featuring just herself on vocals and piano. The band Frankie Cosmos released their fourth studio album, Close It Quietly on September 6, 2019.

Two of Kline's songs, "Fool" and "The End", were both showcased during two episodes on the Netflix series Hilda, the series finale of which she also made the original song "Uncrossed Path" for. Her song "Sappho" was also featured in Heartstopper.

Throughout the first few months of quarantine (during the COVID-19 pandemic), Kline did weekly Instagram livestream performances.

On August 2, 2022 the band announced their new album, Inner World Peace via Sub Pop.

On February 22, 2024, she released the single "Guess What to Do" / "Calling It a Night" in collaboration with Cody Fitzgerald of Stolen Jars as haha same.

On June 27, 2025, the band released its sixth studio album, Different Talking, via Sub Pop.

== Backing bands ==
=== "Frankie Cosmos" ===
- Luke Pyenson – drums, vocals
- Alex Bailey – bass guitar, keyboards
- Lauren Martin – keyboards, synthesizers, harmonies

=== Members of earlier backing bands ===
- Ronnie Mystery (Aaron Maine) – drums, vocals
- Gabby Teardrop (Gabrielle Smith) - keyboards, synthesizers, harmonies
- David Mystery (David Maine) – bass guitar, keyboards

== Discography ==
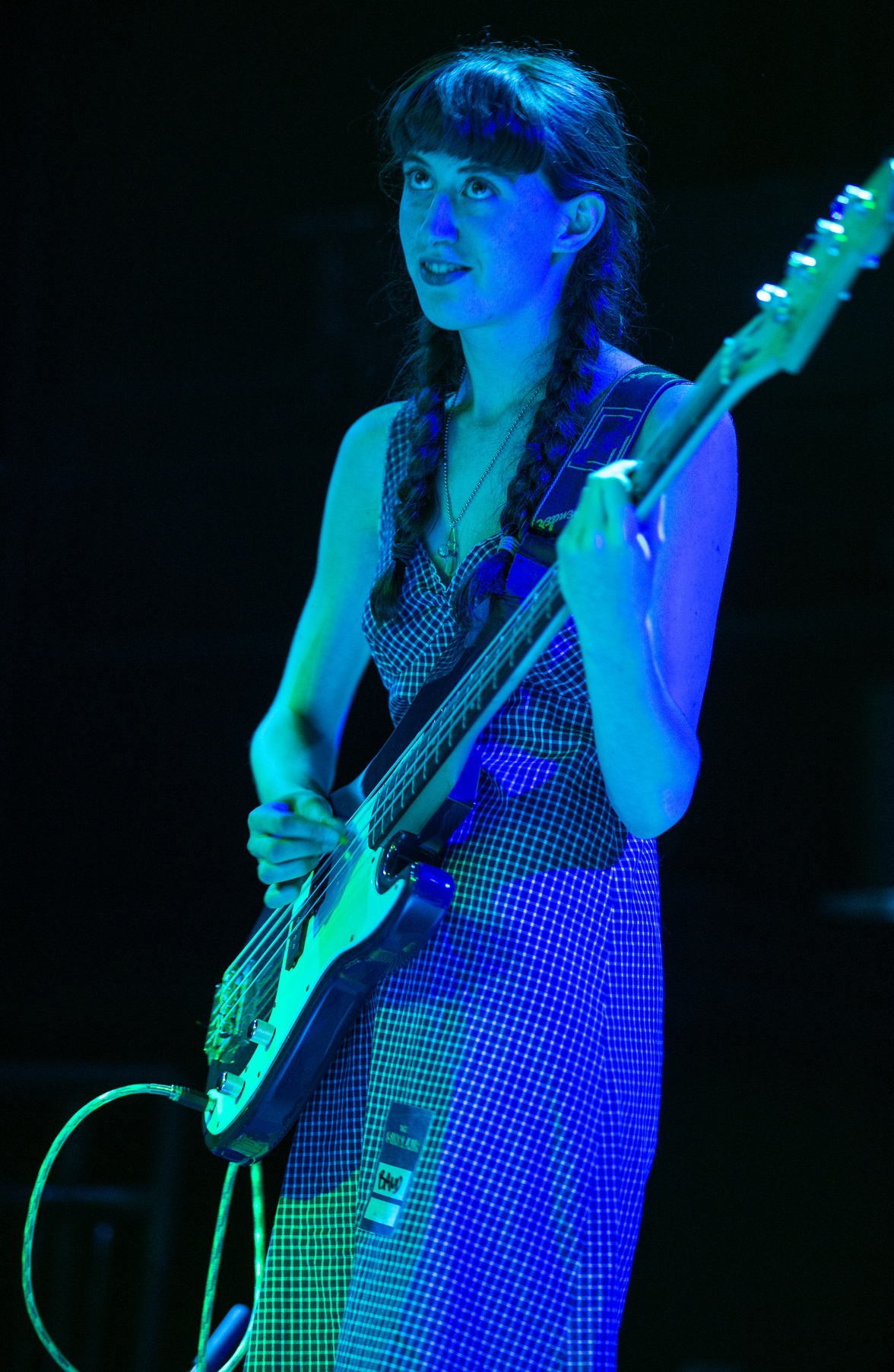
Greta Kline performing with Porches in 2014

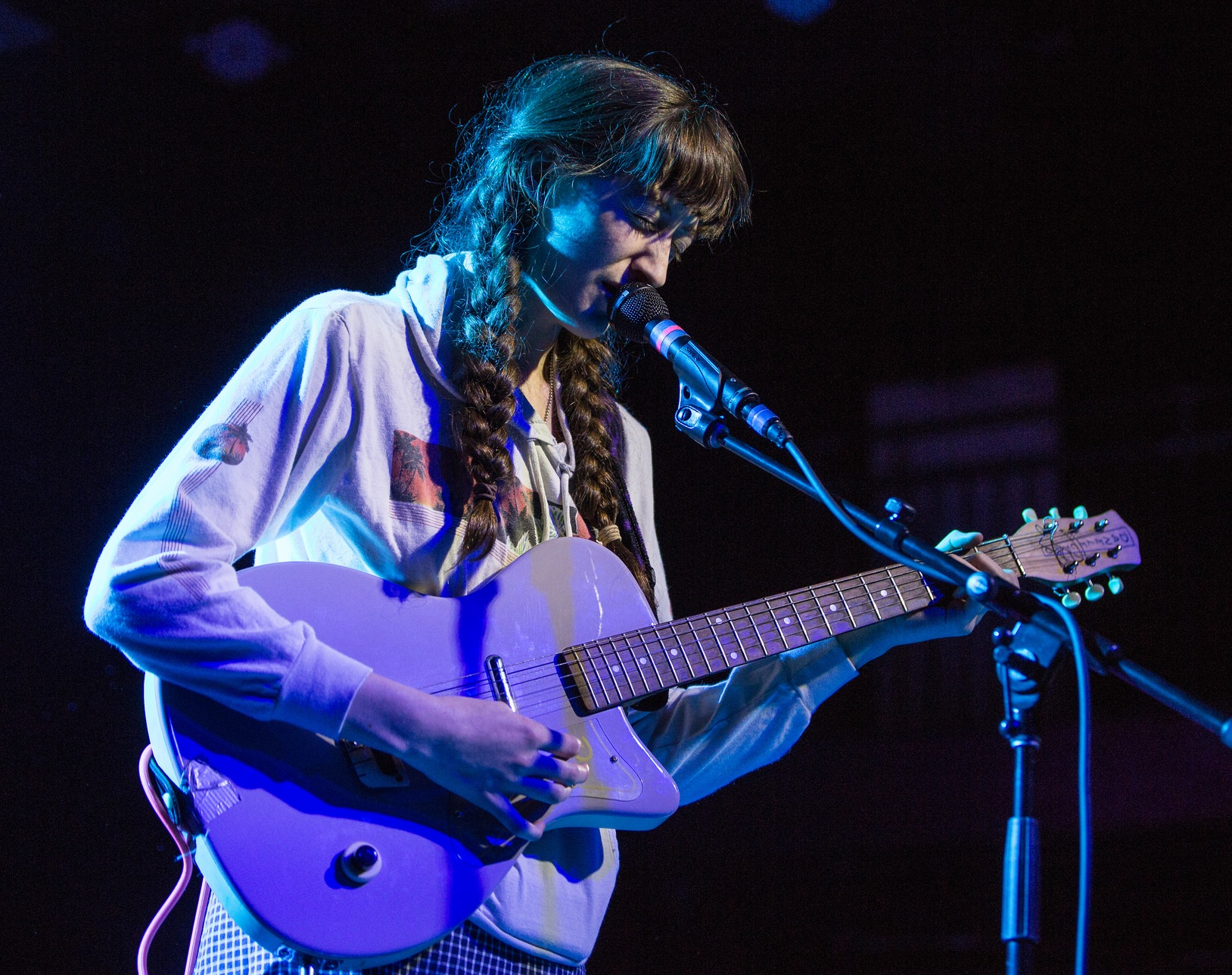
Frankie Cosmos performing in 2014

=== Studio albums ===
- Zentropy (2014)
- Next Thing (2016)
- Vessel (2018)
- Close It Quietly (2019)
- Inner World Peace (2022)
- Different Talking (2025)

=== EPs ===
- Fit Me In (2015)
- Haunted Items (2019) (series of four digital EPs)

=== Singles ===
- Owen (2014)
- Birthday Song (2014)
- Sinister (2016)
- Is It Possible/Sleep Song (2016)
- On the Lips (2016)
- Jesse (2018)
- Being Alive (2018)
- Apathy (2018)
- Windows (2019)
- Rings on a Tree (2019)
- Wannago (2019)
- Slide, split release with Lomelda (2021)
- One Year Stand (2022)
- Aftershook (2022)
- F.O.O.F. (2022)
- Empty Head (2022)

=== Music videos ===
- "Joe Joe (Boys Are Dogs)" (2012; dir. BJ Rubin)
- "Art School" (2014; dir. Sophia Bennett Holmes)
- "embody" (2014)
- "Korean Food" (2016; dir. Greta Kline)
- "Is It Possible / Sleep Song" (2016)
- "Young" (2016; dir. Eliza Doyle)
- "Being Alive" (2018; dir. Daniel Martin)
- "Jesse" (2018; dir. Loroto and Frankie Cosmos)
- "Apathy" (2018; dir. Tom Scharpling)
- "Duet" (2018; dir. Eliza Doyle)
- "Windows" (2019; dir. Eliza Doyle and Greta Kline)
- "Wannago" (2019; dir. Robert Kolodny)
- "Pressed Flower" (2025; dir. Adam Kolodny)

== Filmography ==
- The Anniversary Party (2001)
- The Squid and the Whale (2005)
- Hilda (2018)
- Heartstopper (2022)
