= Vessel (Frankie Cosmos album) =

Studio album by Frankie Cosmos
- Released: March 30, 2018
- Genre: Indie pop
- Length: 33:16
- Label: Sub Pop
- Producer: Frankie Cosmos; Hunter Davidsohn; Carlos Hernandez; Julian Fader

Frankie Cosmos chronology
Next Thing (2016)	Vessel (2018)	Haunted Items (2019)

Singles from Vessel
- 1. "Jesse" Released: January 11, 2018; 2. "Being Alive" Released: February 8, 2018; 3. "Apathy" Released: March 1, 2018

Vessel is the third studio album by Frankie Cosmos, the stage name of American singer-songwriter Greta Kline, released on March 30, 2018, on Sub Pop.

== Critical reception ==
Professional ratings
Aggregate scores
Source	Rating
AnyDecentMusic?	7.2/10
Metacritic	80/100
Review scores
Source	Rating
AllMusic	4/5 stars
The A.V. Club	B
DIY	4/5 stars
Exclaim!	8/10
The Independent	4/5 stars
The Irish Times	3/5 stars
Pitchfork	7.8/10
Q	4/5 stars
Uncut	8/10
Vice	A−

At Metacritic, which assigns a normalized rating out of 100 to reviews from mainstream critics, Vessel received an average score of 80, based on 12 reviews, which indicates "generally favorable reviews".

== Track listing ==
All tracks are written by Greta Kline.

No.	Title	Length
1.	"Caramelize"	3:27
2.	"Apathy"	2:23
3.	"As Often as I Can"	1:02
4.	"This Stuff"	1:38
5.	"Jesse"	2:48
6.	"Duet"	2:12
7.	"Accommodate"	1:34
8.	"I'm Fried"	1:40
9.	"Hereby"	0:57
10.	"Ballad of R & J"	1:35
11.	"Ur Up"	0:35
12.	"Being Alive"	2:22
13.	"Bus Bus Train Train"	1:19
14.	"My Phone"	0:31
15.	"Cafeteria"	2:56
16.	"The End"	1:23
17.	"Same Thing"	1:27
18.	"Vessel"	3:27
Total length:		33:16

== Personnel ==
Adapted from the Frankie Cosmos bandcamp page.

- Greta Kline – guitar, vocals
- David Maine – bass, vocals
- Lauren Martin – keys, vocals, second guitar
- Luke Pyenson – drums

Additional musicians

- Alex Bailey – second guitar (tracks 5 and 6)
- Anna McClellan – vocals (track 12)
- Vishal Narang – vocals (track 18)

== Charts ==
Chart (2018)	Peak position
US Heatseekers Albums (Billboard)	9
US Independent Albums (Billboard)	21
