= John Gibler =

American journalist

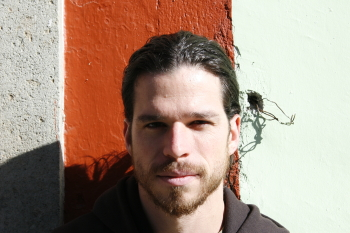
- Gibler in 2011
- Born: Cranfills Gap, Texas, U.S.
- Occupations: Journalist, author

John Gibler is an American journalist who predominantly writes from and about Mexico. He is the author of Mexico Unconquered: Chronicles of Power and Revolt and To Die in Mexico: Dispatches from Inside the Drug War. He is also correspondent for Pacifica Radio's KPFA in Mexico. He has reported on the ground from the Zapatistas Other Campaign, the protests against electoral fraud in Mexico City, and the uprising in Oaxaca. He has reported for Left Turn, In These Times, Common Dreams, Yes! Magazine, ColorLines and Democracy Now!. He was a Global Exchange Media fellow from 2006 to 2008.

== Background ==
Gibler has also reported from Oaxaca for the Canadian Broadcasting Corporation and the international edition of the Miami Herald. Before moving to Mexico, Gibler worked for various human rights and social justice organizations in Mexico, Peru, and California. He reported on environmental justice issues and water privatization in California for Public Citizen, Terrain Magazine, ColorLines, the Environmental Justice Coalition for Water, the Journal on Race, Poverty and the Environment and other independent media. He has been reporting on social movements since January 2006. Topics he has covered in the past include the May 4th massive police raid in San Salvador Atenco, the Uprising in Oaxaca, the Zapatista Other Campaign and the Massive Protest Against Electoral Fraud.

He earned an MSc degree at London School of Economics during 2000 to 2001.

Before that he had also lived in Japan.

Gibler was a Visiting Assistant Professor of Latin American Studies at Hampshire College on 2013, where he taught courses such as Decolonial Thought in Latin America and Violence and Writing in Mexico's Drug War.

He is the brother of Taylor Sheridan.

== Major works ==
- Mexico Unconquered: Chronicles of Power and Revolt (City Lights, 2009) ISBN 978-0-87286-493-1
- To Die in Mexico: Dispatches from Inside the Drug War (City Lights, 2011) ISBN 978-0-87286-517-4
- I Couldn't Even Imagine That They Would Kill Us: An Oral History of the Attacks Against the Students of Ayotzinapa (City Lights, 2017) ISBN 978-0-87286-748-2
- Torn from the World: A Guerrilla's Escape from a Secret Prison in Mexico (City Lights, 2018) ISBN 978-0872867529
