= Porches (band) =

American band

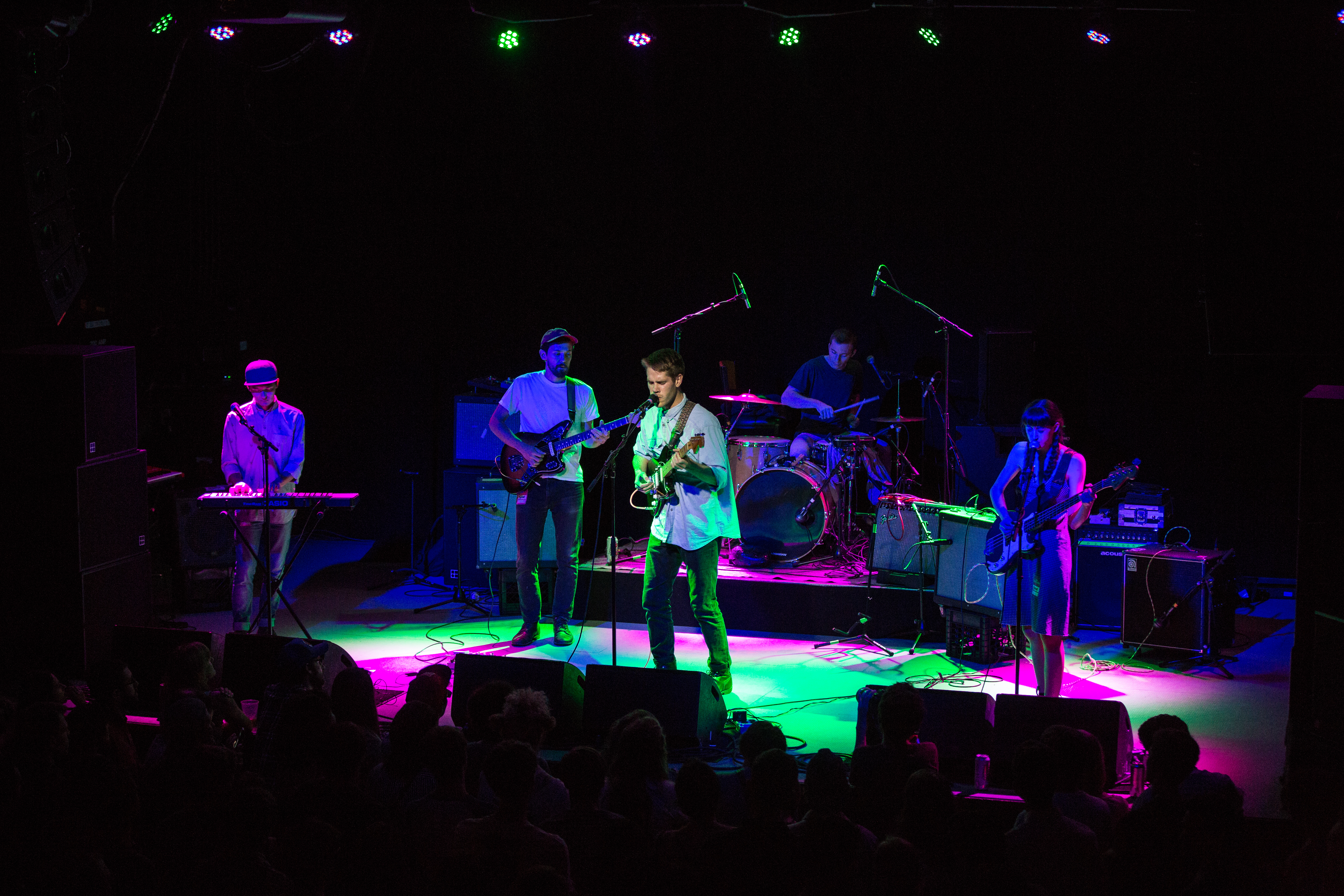
- Porches performing at The Sinclair in Cambridge, Massachusetts in 2014

Background information
- Origin: Pleasantville, New York, United States
- Genres: Synth-pop; indie rock; electronic; dream pop
- Years active: 2010–present
- Labels: Domino; Exploding in Sound; Terrible
- Members: Aaron Maine (Guitar, Vocals); Seiya Jewell (Keyboards); Maya Laner (Bass, Vocals, Synth); Dan English (Guitar); Noah Hecht (Drums)
- Past members: Greta Kline; Cameron Wisch; Kevin Farrant; James Ryan; Matthew Gaffney; Peter McHugh; Jesse Lafian
- Website: Official website

Porches (formerly stylized as PORCHES.) is an American synth-pop project of New York–based musician Aaron Maine, formed in Pleasantville, New York, in 2010.

== History ==
Maine has also released music under the names Aaron Maine, Ronald Paris, and Ronnie Mystery. He has also performed with the bands Aaron Maine and the Reilly Brothers, Space Ghost Cowboys, and Sex God under the Shack Attack Records label.

== Discography ==
=== Studio albums ===
- Slow Dance in the Cosmos (2013)
- Pool (2016)
- The House (2018)
- Ricky Music (2020)
- All Day Gentle Hold ! (2021)
- Shirt (2024)
- MASK (2026)

=== EPs ===
- Summer of Ten (2011)
- Je t'aime (2011)
- Scrap and Love Songs Revisited (2011)
- Water (2016)

=== Singles ===
- "Ronald Paris House" (2014)
- "Hour" (2015)
- "Be Apart" (2016)
- "Country" (2017)
- "Find Me" (2017)
- "rangerover" (2019)
- "rangerover- Vegyn Mix" (2020)
- "I Miss That" (2020)
- "Okay" (2021)
- "Lately" (2021)
- "Back3School" (2021)
- "Itch" (2024)
- "Joker" (2024)
- "Rag" (2024)
- "Shirt" (2025)
- "Lunch" (2025)

== Members ==
=== Current lineup ===
- Aaron Maine (guitar, vocals, since 2010)
- Seiya Jewell (keyboards, since 2011)
- Maya Laner (bass, vocals, synths, since 2013)
- Dan English (guitar, since 2017)
- Noah Hecht (drums, since 2018)

=== Former members ===
- Kevin Farrant (guitar, vocals, 2010–2017)
- Cameron Wisch (drums, 2010–2017)
- Greta Kline (bass, vocals, 2013–2015)
