= Mega (Blank Banshee album) =

Studio album by Blank Banshee
- Released: October 10, 2016
- Recorded: 2014–2016
- Genre: Electronic; vaporwave; vaportrap; IDM
- Length: 32:39
- Label: Hologram Bay
- Producer: Blank Banshee

Blank Banshee chronology
Blank Banshee 1 (2013)	Mega (2016)	Metamorphosis (2019)

Singles from Mega
- 1. "Frozen Flame" Released: October 10, 2016

Alternate cover

Mega (stylized MEGA) is the third studio album by Canadian musician and producer Blank Banshee. It was released via Bandcamp on October 10, 2016.

== Background and composition ==
In late 2014 a new project was announced by Blank Banshee via social media. Tracks from MEGA began appearing in live sets as early as July 2015.

By late 2016 an untitled song (later Frozen Flame) had appeared on Blank Banshee's official website. A Twitter account associated with Blank Banshee initiated an ARG style promotional campaign involving an e-mail address that responded to fans via auto-reply with daily cryptic 'fragments' of a short story concluding on the eve of MEGA’s release. The story 'Zero-Day', makes reference to several song titles and themes presented on MEGA.

MEGA was composed using an Akai MPD26 and live instrumentation. It has been described as a “balance of abstract ambience and dance-able trap”. A continuation and expansion of Blank Banshee's signature sound, it is considerably more experimental, relying less on samples than its precursors. In a 2016 interview, Driscoll spoke of the link between his music and ‘virtual environments’, comparing his writing approach to that of 90's RPG music composers.

The album artwork was designed by Blank Banshee and features a 3D model of a meteor layered over a fuchsia gradient background.

MEGA was produced, recorded and mastered in Vancouver, Canada.

== Promotion and release ==
In the spring of 2017, Blank Banshee embarked on The MEGA Tour, a 3 leg tour spanning Canada, Europe and America concluding in autumn of 2017.

MEGA has been released on Cassette Tape, Compact Disc, Vinyl and USB Flash Drive independently through the online store Hologram Bay.

== Reception ==
In an article posted after the release of MEGA, The Fader makes note of Blank Banshee's cult following. MEGA's “fragmented-yet-soulful vaportrap bridges the yawning chasm between itself and Blank Banshee 1" notes Bandcamp daily. Online publication Pigeons and Planes called the album Blank Banshee's “best project yet”, praising its inventive use of samples and distinct textures.

== Track listing ==
Adapted from official liner notes.

No.	Title	Length
1.	"BIOS"	1:07
2.	"My Machine"	2:10
3.	"Frozen Flame"	2:38
4.	"Gunshots"	2:24
5.	"Megaflora"	2:14
6.	"Ecco Chamber"	2:25
7.	"Holograffiti"	2:01
8.	"XENOS"	2:30
9.	"Sandclock"	2:16
10.	"Hungry Ghost"	2:21
11.	"Web Ring"	2:33
12.	"Meteor Blade"	2:33
13.	"JUNO"	1:51
14.	"Cerulean"	2:16
15.	"EXOS"	1:25
Total length:		33:00

Notes

- "My Machine", "Gunshots", "XENOS", and "Hungry Ghost" feature vocals and voice by Cormorant.
- "Web Ring" features vocals by Jaya.
