= Nobody Here =

Nobody Here may refer to:

- "Nobody Here", a song on Chuck Person's Eccojams Vol. 1
- "Nobody Here", a song on Memory Vague
