= Grafton Tanner =

American author and academic

Grafton Tanner is an American author and academic. His work focuses on Big Tech, nostalgia, neoliberalism, and education. Tanner is a limited-term instructor at the University of Georgia's Department of Communications.

== Career ==
=== Babbling Corpse ===
Tanner's first book, Babbling Corpse: Vaporwave and the Commodification of Ghosts, was written in 2016 for Zer0 Books Publishers. Tanner analyzed vaporwave, a genre of lo-fi music based on internet aesthetics and 1980s consumerism, through the lens of Mark Fisher's capitalist realism as a response to capitalism in a post-September 11th world saturated with culture. Babbling Corpse was generally well received by reviewers. Writing for Broken Pencil, Joel Vaughan claimed the book is best when dealing with aesthetics, but "loses a little steam when diving into the mud of theory," and vaporwave magazine Private Suite Magazine featured a review of the book as a cover issue.

Following the English release of Tanner's third book, The Hours Have Lost Their Clock, Babbling Corpse received a 2022 Spanish translation by Cristóbal Durán for Ediciones Holobionte, titled Un cadáver balbuceante. El Vaporwave y los fantasmas electrónicos. Eduardo Almiñana of Culturplaza praised the book for portraying hyperconsumerism as a sickness of culture that vaporwave fights against, stating: "tendencies like YouTube Poop and many other forms of expression that include the appropriation and alteration with few means have flourished like ephemeral mushrooms in the shadows of artificial fires and in the medium of a widespread poltergeist."

== Views ==
In an interview with Enrique Zamorano of El Confidencial, Tanner states that artificial intelligence models like ChatGPT embody the cultural malaise of hauntology as machines can only artificially replicate human nostalgia and societal attitudes.

== Books ==
- Babbling Corpse: Vaporwave and the Commodification of Ghosts, 2016. Zer0 Books. ISBN 1782797599, 978-1782797593.
- The Circle of the Snake: Nostalgia and Utopia in the Age of Big Tech, 2020. Zer0 Books. ISBN 1789040221, 978-1789040227.
- The Hours Have Lost Their Clock: The Politics of Nostalgia, 2021. Repeater Books. ISBN 9781913462444.
- Foreverism, 2024. Polity. ISBN 1509558063, 978-1509558063.
- Purging the Devil: Exorcism and Possession After the Death of God. Repeater Books. 2025. ISBN 9781914420672.
