= Zones Without People =

Studio album by Oneohtrix Point Never
- Released: August 6, 2009
- Genre: Ambient
- Length: 31:20

Oneohtrix Point Never chronology
Memory Vague (2009)	Zones Without People (2009)	Rifts (2009)

Zones Without People is the second studio album by American electronic musician Daniel Lopatin, known by the name Oneohtrix Point Never. It was released on August 6, 2009 via Arbor as a limited-run LP. Most of the material on the album also appeared on the 2009 compilation album Rifts. The other albums in the Rifts trilogy are Betrayed In The Octagon and Russian Mind, released in 2007 and 2009 respectively.

== Music ==
Zones Without People is an ambient album. Lopatin described the album as combining multiple approaches to psychedelic music. It uses "druggy" and "dreamy" synth tones to help build walls of ambient sound, according to AllMusic. The synth tones use arpeggiated sine and saw waves with reverb effects applied. Critics have described the album as sounding devoid of humanity, as described by its title; Sputnikmusic described the album as embodying places "that no one else can inhabit and are probably better if left that way".

The 9-minute "Format & Journey North" uses drones, pan flute, and water recordings. The title track "Zones Without People" uses looping synthesizer pads, sounding beautiful, yet inhuman, according to Pitchfork. Stereogum described “Learning To Control Myself” as sounding like the "frenetic tangle of laser rumble".

== Reception ==
Zones Without People received 4 out 5 point ratings from both AllMusic and Sputnikmusic. The album was ranked eighth out of nine within Lopatin's discography in a 2017 Stereogum article. They found the album to be "restless, inconclusive" and a poor introduction to Lopatin's discography, as it may seem off-putting. According to AllMusic, the album helped build Lopatin's reputation for "subaquatic synth tones" and "walls of ambient sound".

== Track listing ==
1. "Computer Vision" – 2:22
2. "Format & Journey North" – 9:45
3. "Zones Without People" – 3:59
4. "Learning to Control Myself" – 5:35
5. "Disconnecting Entirely" – 1:32
6. "Emil Cioran" – 3:34
7. "Hyperdawn" – 4:33

Total length: 31:20
