= Blank Banshee 0 =

Studio album by Blank Banshee
- Released: September 1, 2012
- Recorded: 2010–2012 (Saint John, Canada)
- Genre: Vaporwave; vaportrap; electronic
- Length: 33:03
- Label: Hologram Bay
- Producer: Patrick Driscoll

Blank Banshee chronology
Blank Banshee 0 (2012)	Blank Banshee 1 (2013)

Blank Banshee 0 is the debut studio album by Canadian artist and producer Blank Banshee. It was released for free via Bandcamp on September 1, 2012.

== Background and composition ==
In 2010, Patrick Driscoll and Curtis "Cormorant" Ferguson began performing live as Blank Banshees (previously Shinjuku Mad) which consisted of "predominantly instrumental" compositions. By 2012, the duo had become a solo act, with Driscoll continuing to release instrumental music under the pseudonym Blank Banshee and Ferguson appearing as a recurrent guest vocalist.

Blank Banshee 0 was produced between 2011 and 2012 in Driscoll's hometown of Saint John, Canada.

In the summer of 2012, Driscoll made a move for the West Coast, seeking to escape the "bubble of economic and demographic slump" plaguing the creative industry of his Maritimes hometown at the time; he relocated to Vancouver, Canada, releasing Blank Banshee 0 shortly thereafter.

The album was released as a pay what you want digital download via Bandcamp on September 1, 2012.

Blank Banshee 0 was composed with an Akai MPD26 using Ableton Live. The album consists of largely 1980s and 1990s sourced samples layered over original beats, instrumentation and vocals. Several aspects of the album, including song titles, allude to computer technology. Many tracks blend trap-style beats with elements of seapunk and vaporwave, such as operating system start-up sounds and 1990s-era video game music. Exclaim! named "Teen Pregnancy" among notable songs featuring samples inspired by "The Message" by Grandmaster Flash and the Furious Five. Commenting on his use of sampling, Driscoll states it "stemmed from a desire to separate myself from the guitar driven music I was making and listening to at the time."

Many songs on the album feature vocal and lyrical contributions by Cormorant, the stage name accredited to Curtis Ferguson. The song "Dreamcast" features a vocal melody by Ferguson from a Shinjuku Mad song originally released in 2010.

Blank Banshee 0 has been released on cassette tape, compact disc, vinyl, and USB flash drive independently through the online store Hologram Bay.

== Critical reception ==
Blank Banshee 0's "vaportrap" production style helped popularize vaporwave in the 2010s. The album's influence has since been attributed to a shift in the direction of the genre.

Esquire calls it "more approachable" than other vaporwave subgenres while building "on the basic premise". In 2016 The Fader called Blank Banshee 0 a "definitive document of the vaporwave era." Bandcamp Daily called the album "a progressive record, abandoning the often dissonant nature of vaporwave but emphasizing the more accessible elements, and incorporating beats characteristic of trap music."

== In popular culture ==
"Teen Pregnancy" became part of a viral video trend in 2016 called Simpsonwave.

== Track listing ==
Adapted from official liner notes.

No.	Title	Length
1.	"B:/ Start Up"	1:09
2.	"Wavestep"	2:43
3.	"Bathsalts"	2:49
4.	"Ammonia Clouds"	2:43
5.	"Venus Death Trap"	2:14
6.	"Hyper Object"	2:45
7.	"Photosynthesis"	2:51
8.	"Deep Space"	2:17
9.	"Dreamcast"	2:02
10.	"Cyber Zodiac"	2:21
11.	"Teen Pregnancy"	2:57
12.	"Purity Boys"	1:42
13.	"Visualization"	1:47
14.	"World Vision"	1:54
15.	"B:/ Shut Down/Depression"	0:52
Total length:		33:00

Notes

- "Wavestep", "Venus Death Trap", "Hyper Object", "Photosynthesis" and "Dreamcast" feature words and vocals by Cormorant.
