= Blank Banshee 1 =

Studio album by Blank Banshee
- Released: 20 October 2013
- Recorded: 2012–2013, Victoria, Canada
- Genre: Electronic; vaporwave; vaportrap
- Length: 31:03
- Label: Hologram Bay
- Producer: Patrick Driscoll

Blank Banshee chronology
Blank Banshee 0 (2012)	Blank Banshee 1 (2013)	MEGA (2016)

Blank Banshee 1 is the second studio album by Canadian musician and producer Blank Banshee. It was released as a free digital download via Bandcamp on October 20, 2013.

== Background and composition ==
Production for Blank Banshee 1 began in late 2012 with tracks such as ‘Eco Zones’ appearing as early as February 2013. The album was announced officially through social media on September 22, 2013. The music video for "Infinite Login" was released preceding the album on October 19, 2013.

Blank Banshee 1 consists of 15 tracks, largely instrumental in nature. It was produced using an Akai APC40 and features heavy use of 808 drums and micro-samples sourced from video games, and early 2000s computer software. Themes of consumerist detachment and alienation appear throughout the album. Song titles such as "Infinite Login", "Anxiety Online!" and "Cyber Slums" assert a juxtaposition of modern technology, angst and desolation. The album has been called Vaportrap and ‘Post-Internet’. It manifests a "future sound that can be ‘cold’ and digital-and even carry connotations of luxury and the virtual world".

Blank Banshee 1 was produced in Victoria, Canada.

The album artwork was designed by Blank Banshee and depicts a series of colored cubes in a triangular formation over a monochromatic gradient.

Blank Banshee 1 has been released on Cassette Tape, Compact Disc, Vinyl and USB Flash Drive independently through the online store Hologram Bay.

== Paradise Disc ==
Paradise Disc is a series of 6 computer-animated videos produced by Banshee, serving as the official music videos for Blank Banshee 1.

The series was released via YouTube between October 19, 2013 and January 1, 2014.

== Reception ==
The Fader called Blank Banshee 1 "a masterwork of the new digital psychedelia" and a "definitive document of the Vaporwave era".

== Track listing ==
Adapted from official liner notes.

No.	Title	Length
1.	"B:/ Infinite Login"	1:00
2.	"Eco Zones"	2:24
3.	"Metamaterial"	1:54
4.	"Anxiety Online !"	2:02
5.	"Java Clouds/مجسمه سازی مهتاب"	2:12
6.	"LSD Polyphony"	1:38
7.	"Conflict Minerals"	2:36
8.	"Metal Rain"	2:12
9.	"Big Gulp"	2:12
10.	"Doldrum Corp."	1:22
11.	"Cyber Slums"	2:02
12.	"Realization"	1:41
13.	"Solar Plexus"	2:30
14.	"Paradise Disc"	3:09
15.	"B:/ Hidden/Reality"	1:53

Notes

- "Eco Zones" and "Cyberslums" feature vocals by Cormorant.
