= New Dreams Ltd. =

Studio album by Laserdisc Visions
- Released: July 1, 2011
- Genre: Vaporwave
- Length: 29:41
- Label: Beer on the Rug; PrismCorp
- Producer: Ramona Andra Xavier

Vektroid chronology
| Starcalc (2011) | New Dreams Ltd. (2011) | Initiation Tape (2011) |

Alternate cover
- 2012 reissue cover

New Dreams Ltd. is the third studio album by American electronic musician Vektroid under the alias Laserdisc Visions released on July 1, 2011. The album is an early example of the genre vaporwave.

== Release ==
The album was released through the independent label Beer on the Rug and Vektroid's own label PrismCorp. The album has good reviews and is one of Vektroid's more popular releases. A digital reissue of the album in 2012 included six bonus tracks, but removed the reverberated Japanese commercials that played for the length of the original release, leaving only the original and sample-based compositions.

== Track listing ==
| No. | Title | Length |
|---|---|---|
| 1. | "Mind Access" | 1:38 |
| 2. | "Malls" | 1:56 |
| 3. | "Dual" | 0:42 |
| 4. | "Idgaf Island" | 0:39 |
| 5. | "Rooftop Cage" | 0:39 |
| 6. | "Tingri" | 2:02 |
| 7. | "Ewing" | 0:46 |
| 8. | "Tear" (originally titled "Zik Zak") | 0:49 |
| 9. | "Liquid Air" | 0:56 |
| 10. | "Lucky Tomato" | 2:20 |
| 11. | "3D Wave" | 1:03 |
| 12. | "Into Dreams" | 1:14 |
| 13. | "Forbidden City" | 1:01 |
| 14. | "Rainbow Babe" | 1:16 |
| 15. | "Tree" | 0:53 |
| 16. | "Hits" | 0:51 |
| 17. | "Select" | 1:36 |
| 18. | "Photo Studio" | 0:54 |
| 19. | "Los Santos" | 1:33 |
| 20. | "Information" | 1:17 |
| 21. | "Data Dream" | 2:43 |
| 22. | "Laserdisc Visions" | 2:35 |
| 23. | "Body" | 1:22 |
| 24. | "Yellowhead" | 0:56 |
| 25. | "Kowloon" | 1:42 |
| 26. | "Untitled" | 0:32 |
| 27. | "Grid" | 0:52 |
| Total length: | | 29:41 |

== See also ==
- 2011 in music
- Ambient music
