= Floral Shoppe =

Studio album by Macintosh Plus
- Released: December 9, 2011
- Studio: PrismCorp Studios (Portland)
- Genres: Vaporwave; plunderphonics; synth funk
- Length: 47:47
- Label: Beer on the Rug
- Producer: Macintosh Plus

Vektroid chronology
Dream Castle (2011)	Floral Shoppe (2011)	Contemporary Sapporo (2012)

Alternate covers
- 2012 reissue cover (featuring the faceless bust of Helios)

- Cassette release artwork

Floral Shoppe (Japanese: フローラルの専門店, Hepburn: Furōraru no Senmon-ten) is the ninth studio album by the American electronic musician Ramona Andra Langley, released on December 9, 2011, under the alias Macintosh Plus by the independent record label Beer on the Rug. It was one of the first releases of the 2010s microgenre known as vaporwave to gain popular recognition on the Internet, establishing a blueprint for the genre and popularizing the style, which had later influence on a range of art styles as well as meme culture on the internet.

== Background and composition ==
Vaporwave is an Internet music-based genre of music that is defined by its slow, chopped and screwed remixes of popular 1980s and 1990s music. The subculture that developed from the genre has been described as a parody on consumerism and often includes retro computer imagery to reflect on 1990s aesthetics. The genre had its first templates from Chuck Person's Eccojams Vol. 1 (2010) by Daniel Lopatin and Far Side Virtual (2011) by James Ferraro. Floral Shoppe is frequently cited as the first proper example of the then-emerging genre, along with works from other artists released by the record label Beer on the Rug. Prior to Floral Shoppe, Macintosh Plus had previously produced other releases under multiple pseudonyms, including Vektroid, Laserdisc Visions, and New Dreams Ltd.

Macintosh Plus – "リサフランク420 / 現代のコンピュー"
An excerpt from "リサフランク420 / 現代のコンピュー" by Macintosh Plus

Adam Harper of Dummy, in an article about the vaporwave culture, described the album's content as "chopped, glitching and screwed adult contemporary soul alongside twinkling spa promotional tunes." Other descriptions that have been attributed to Floral Shoppe, and to the vaporwave genre in general, include 1980s funk, elevator music, and heavy use of sampling and remixing of such genres. Macintosh Plus takes an unorthodox approach to sampling throughout Floral Shoppe, with "voices slowed to wordless drawls, tempos abused at whim, [and] snippets mashed over each other at clashing time signatures." The album's second track, "Lisa Frank 420 / Modern Computing" which is a slowed down, chopped and screwed remix of "It's Your Move" by Diana Ross, has been noted as a model for vaporwave songs.

== Release ==
Floral Shoppe was released digitally to Macintosh Plus' Bandcamp music store on December 9, 2011, by the independent record label Beer on the Rug. It received considerable online popularity, eventually becoming "the most hyped vaporwave release on the Internet."

Packaged within the album are aesthetics that convey 1980s visuals which define the genre. With heavy implication on retro computer imagery, it depicts a sculpture of the Greek god Helios and the Japanese title in bright pink, tiled surroundings with a background of the Twin Towers. Macintosh Plus later launched a line of tank tops and hoodies sporting a variation of the Floral Shoppe album cover.

== Reception ==
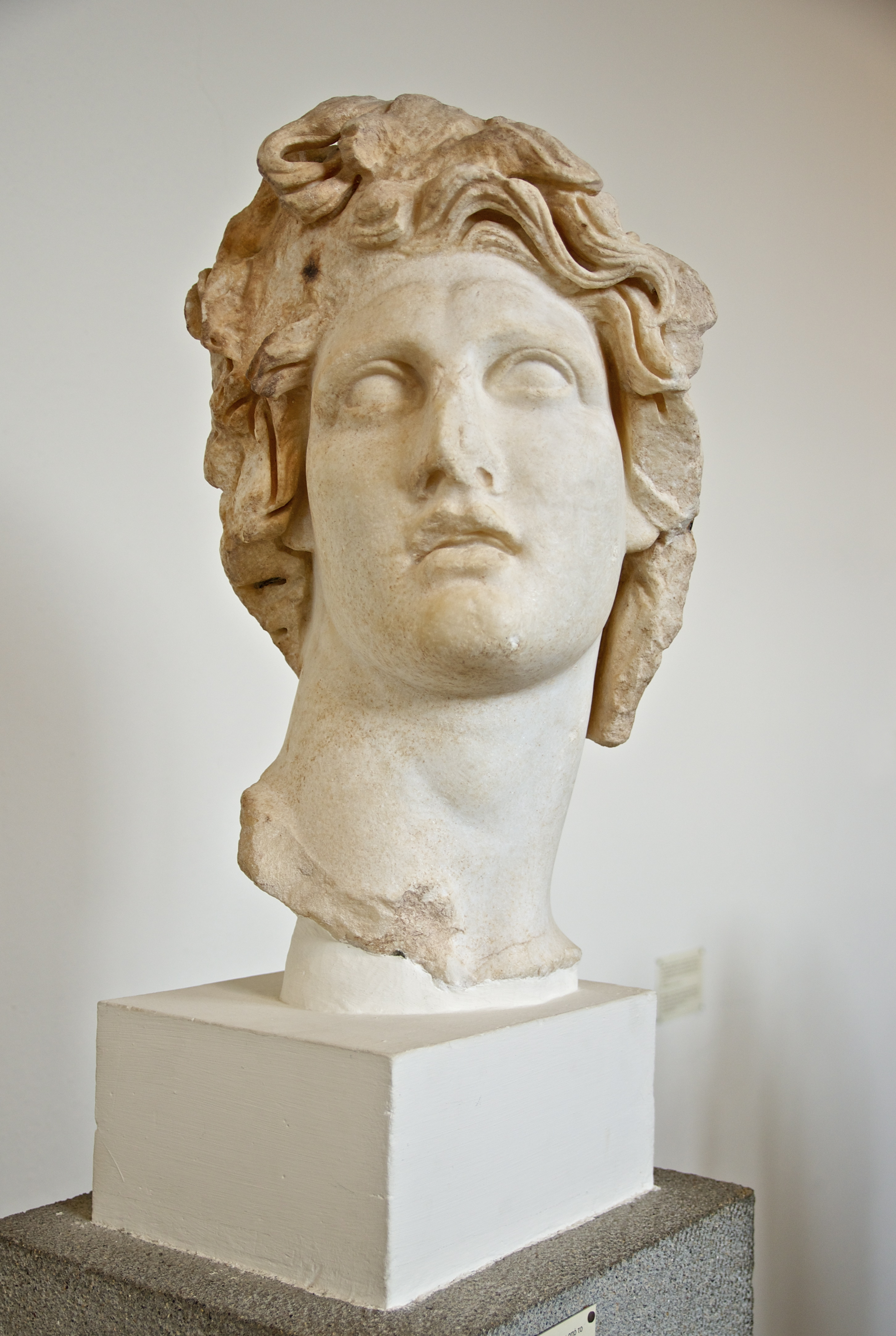
The cover uses a bust of the Greek god Helios found in the Archaeological Museum of Rhodes.

Floral Shoppe was met with polarizing reception from critics and casual listeners alike, being equally "criticized and acclaimed for [Macintosh Plus'] soulless take on muzak". Jonathan Dean of Tiny Mix Tapes wrote positively of Floral Shoppe, citing the album as "one of the best single documents of the vaporwave scene yet, a series of estranged but soulful manipulations of found audio that carefully constructs its own meditative headspace through the careful accretion of defamiliarized memory triggers." YouTube music critic Anthony Fantano's review of the album has been credited with establishing the album as a representative album of the vaporwave subgenre, and also as being a pivotal moment in the decline of the subgenre as a whole. Fantano reviewed the album negatively, rating it 4/10 and concluding "certainly it sounds nice, it has style, but there's really not much there in terms of how it's assembled". In a 2019 video, "10 Times I Changed My Opinion On Albums Pt. 2", Fantano reiterated feelings that the execution of the album was unsophisticated, but noted its influence on later developments in the vaporwave genre, and opined that the songs on the album have "artistic merit independent of the songs actually being sampled".

On the year-end annual Pazz & Jop critics' poll for albums, administered by The Village Voice, the album received two votes. Perfect Sound Forever's Miles Bowe cited Floral Shoppe as one of his year-end best albums. It was also named the sixth-best album of the year by Tiny Mix Tapes, with reviewer James Parker opining that it "slid seamlessly between pure pop pleasure and the ironic framing of that pleasure, the presence of the artist at turns barely noticeable and dramatically foregrounded." Assessing the influence of Floral Shoppe on vaporwave, along with the genre's perceived decline, Parker wrote:

In many ways, New Dreams Ltd., the umbrella moniker for Macintosh Plus, 情報デスクVIRTUAL, Laserdisc Visions, and Sacred Tapestry, embodied the genre best. Not only did it provide some of vaporwave's most essential releases, but it also cannily folded at just the right moment, thanking us all for visiting the Virtual Casino. 2012 wasn't just the year vaporwave broke; it was also the year it exhausted itself: morphed, rebranded, its practitioners moved on. If any single release deserves to be remembered, though, it is surely Floral Shoppe. From the very beginning, it stood out not only for its artful marrying of the conceptual with the sensual but also for its performance of the inseparability between the two.

In 2019, eight years after the release, Pitchfork wrote a review and gave it a rating of 8.8 out of 10.

== Legacy ==
Floral Shoppe has since been heralded as one of the most significant albums in the early days of vaporwave. In a retrospective review, Adam Downer of Sputnikmusic characterized the album as "constantly—and delightfully—unsettling" and "a beautiful record that's both warm and strange, nostalgic and futuristic, bizarre and totally simple." Writing for Pitchfork, Miles Bowe concluded, "Nothing could change or improve its sound which, even after thousands of soundalikes, has lost none of its perception-shattering power." Vice (Noisey) listed Floral Shoppe as 95th on their ranking of the 100 best albums of the 2010s.

== Track listing ==
2011 digital release
No.	Title	Length
1.	"Boot" (ブート Būto)	3:24
2.	"Lisa Frank 420 / Modern Computing" (リサフランク420 / 現代のコンピュー Risa Furanku 420 / Gendai no Konpyū)	7:20
3.	"Floral Shoppe" (花の専門店 Hana no Senmon-ten)	3:55
4.	"Library" (ライブラリ Raiburari)	2:43
5.	"Geography" (地理 Chiri)	4:46
6.	"Chill Divin' with ECCO" (ECCOと悪寒ダイビング ECCO to Okan Daibingu)	6:42
7.	"Mathematics" (数学 Sūgaku)	6:54
8.	"Standby" (待機 Taiki)	1:10
9.	"Te" (て)	2:16
Total length:		39:15

2012 digital reissue
No.	Title	Length
10.	"Moon" (月 Tsuki; untitled on original release)	6:14
11.	"Seabed" (海底 Kaitei; untitled on original release)	2:18
Total length:		47:47

2012 cassette and 2017 vinyl/digital releases
No.	Title	Length
1.	"Boot" (ブート Būto)	3:21
2.	"Lisa Frank 420 / Modern Computing" (リサフランク420 / 現代のコンピュー Risa Furanku 420 / Gendai no Konpyū)	7:12
3.	"Floral Shoppe" (花の専門店 Hana no Senmon-ten)	3:18
4.	"Library" (ライブラリ Raiburari)	2:47
5.	"Geography" (地理 Chiri)	4:38
6.	"Chill Divin' with ECCO" (ECCOと悪寒ダイビング ECCO to Okan Daibingu)	6:23
7.	"Mathematics" (数学 Sūgaku)	7:31
8.	"Foreign Banks Aviation" (外ギン Aviation Soto Gin Aviation)	2:30
9.	"I Am Pico" (ピコ "Piko")	2:03
10.	"Standby" (待機 Taiki)	1:10
11.	"Te" (て)	2:02
Total length:		42:57

Notes

- "Lisa Frank 420 / Modern Computing" (リサフランク420 / 現代のコンピュー Risa Furanku 420 / Gendai no Konpyū) is sometimes translated as "The Computing of Lisa Frank / Contemporary 420"
