= Overdevelopment =

Concept in international economics, associated with overconsumption's downsides

In international economics, overdevelopment refers to a way of seeing global inequality and pollution that focuses on the negative consequences of excessive consumption. It is the opposite extreme to underdevelopment.

In mainstream development theory, the "underdevelopment" of states, regions, or cultures is as a problem to be solved. Populations and economies are considered "underdeveloped" if they do not achieve the levels of wealth through the industrialisation associated with the Industrial Revolution and the ideals of education, rationality, and modernity associated with the Enlightenment. In contrast, the framework of overdevelopment shifts the focus to the 'developed' countries of the global North, asking "questions about why excessive consumption amongst the affluent is not also seen foremost as an issue of development." By questioning how and why economic development is unevenly distributed around the world, one can evaluate the global North's role and responsibility as "overdevelopers" in producing global inequality. According to various surveys, the Western consumer lifestyle fails to make people notably happy, while causing increasingly dire ecological degradation. Overdevelopment is a crucial factor for the environment, the social realm, human rights, and the global economy.

== Origins ==
Leopold Kohr published The Overdeveloped Nations: The Diseconomies Of Scale in 1977. Over development is characterised by hyperconsumption.

== Counterproductivity ==
Ivan Illich describes a similar process by which industry develops a technology past the point of usefulness so much that industry's efforts effectively sabotage its stated aims. Thus, according to Illich, intensive schooling stupefies, high-speed transport immobilizes, and hospitals kill, among others. Illich believed that past the critical threshold, the product of industry served to deprive people of their native ability to subsist, to learn, move and heal autonomously, which left them more ignorant, isolated and sick than if industry had not reached beyond the threshold of overdevelopment. Decay in the human condition appears because under industrial overdevelopment, "people are trained for consumption rather than for action, and at the same time their range of action is narrowed." Counterproductivity has been called "probably Illich's most original contribution."

== Environmental implications ==
Excessive consumption causes negative environmental impacts in both "overdeveloped" and "underdeveloped" regions: "Findings indicate that there are significant differences across countries of the world in the consumption quality of life of its citizens. Using the Human Development Index, which is composed of longevity, knowledge, and standard of living, data reveal that lives worsen from west to east, with the worst conditions in South Asia and Sub-Saharan Africa. Additionally, environmental damage estimates, as determined by the EDI composite developed specifically for this investigation, demonstrate that wealthier nations create environmental degradation that is consistent with their higher consumption patterns rather than their absolute numbers."

=== Post-colonial ===
The legacy of colonialism can be said to play a role in why overdevelopment has been largely unconsidered due to the "almost exclusive focus on 'underdevelopment' and the underdeveloped world that has characterized development studies and associated disciplines for so long needs."

Mainstream development work aims at fighting poverty, sickness and crisis in "underdeveloped" regions. The sentiment of "metropolitan responsibility for distant human suffering" is reminiscent of imperialist and colonial movements from Europe and North America, as they "became entwined within global networks of exchange and exploitation in the late eighteenth and early nineteenth centuries." The colonial mindset frames the fixation with the global North coming to the aid of "distant others". That view could be countered with an equal attentiveness to the problems of "overdevelopment" and the overdeveloped world.

=== Marxist ===
Marxist work argues that an impact of global capitalism is to produce inequality. The two faces of capitalism are underdevelopment, occurring in the "Third World," and overdevelopment, occurring in Europe and North America. Consumption of commodities drives the overdeveloping form of capitalism in the global North. "Almost everything we now eat and drink, wear and use, listen to and hear, watch and learn come to us in commodity form and is shaped by divisions of labour, the pursuit of product niches and the general evolution of discourses and ideologies that embody precepts of capitalism." "Circular and cumulative causation within the economy then ensures that capital rich regions tend to grow richer while poor regions grow poorer."

== Responses ==
Responses to overdevelopment include the degrowth movement, sustainable development, anti-development, and other local or indigenous resistance movements. One such method being put into place in different regions around the world is a population cap.

Indigenous movements such as the Aloha ʻAina movement and the Zapatista Army of National Liberation movement often have their own concepts of development, overdevelopment, and sustainability. Their versions of those concepts overlap with those of environmental activism but differ in many important ways, many of which relate to the ideal interrelation of humans and environment in the particular places in question.

== See also ==
- Degrowth
