= Vaporwave =

Online musical genre and visual aesthetic

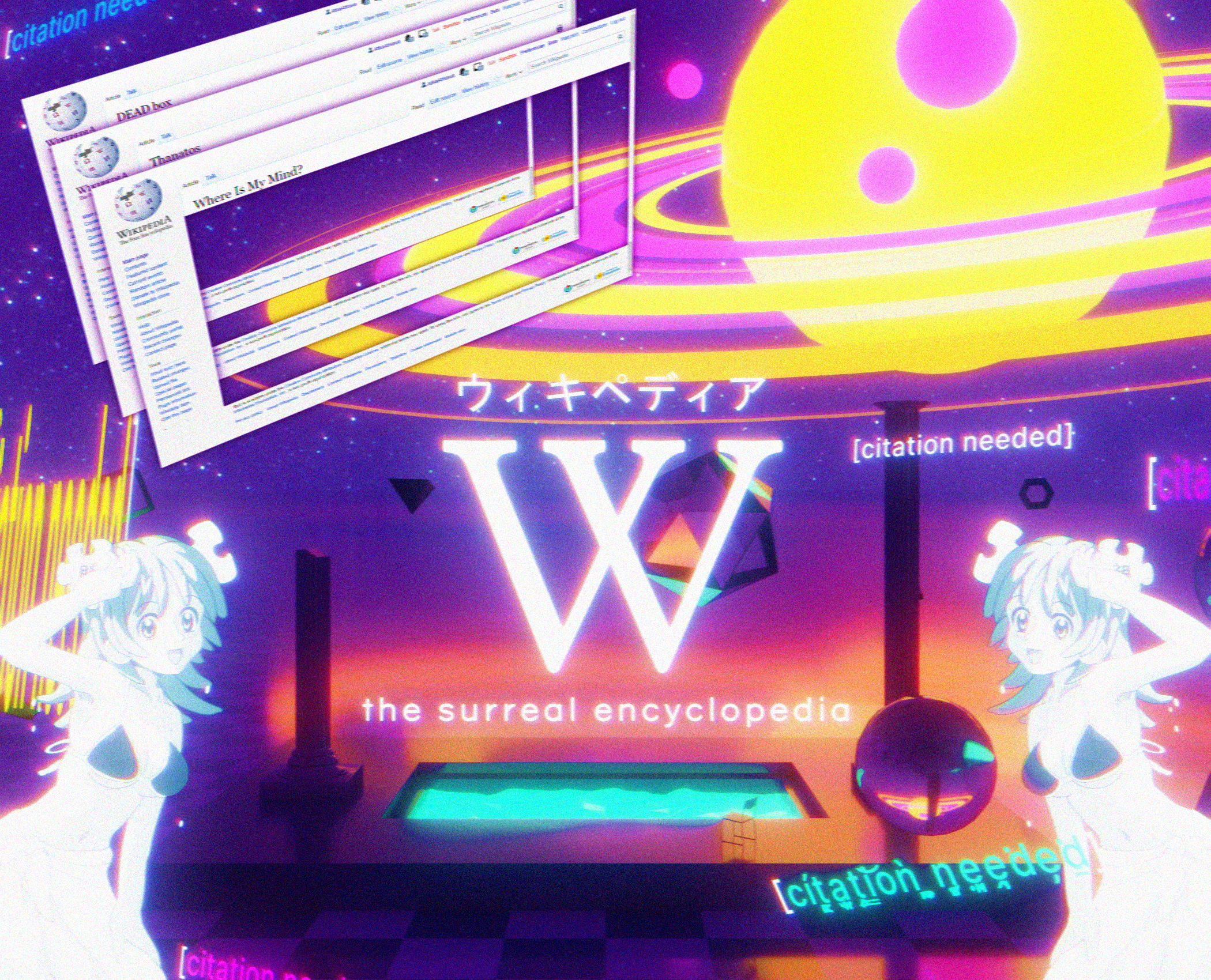
- A vaporwave-style image with Wikipedia as the main theme
- Etymology: Vaporware
- Stylistic origins: Art pop; chopped and screwed; chillwave; city pop; dance; electronic; elevator music; hypnagogic pop; Italo disco; lounge; post-noise; new-age; new wave; plunderphonics; pop ballads; post-Internet; R&B; smooth jazz
- Cultural origins: Early 2010s, Internet
- Typical instruments: Audio editing software; digital audio workstation; sequencer; sampler
- Derivative forms: Simpsonwave

Subgenres
- Mallsoft; future funk; hardvapour; late night lo-fi; VHS pop; utopian virtual; vaportrap; vapornoise; signalwave; slushwave; barber beats

Fusion genres
- Fashwave

Other topics
- Cloud rap; distroid; hauntology; seapunk; synthwave; wave; witch house; post-Internet music; internet music

Vaporwave is an internet music microgenre, aesthetic, and meme that emerged in the early 2010s. It is defined partly by its slowed-down, chopped and screwed samples of smooth jazz, elevator music, R&B, and lounge music from the 1980s and 1990s. The surrounding subculture is sometimes associated with an ambiguous or satirical take on consumer capitalism and pop culture and tends to be characterized by a nostalgic or surrealist engagement with the popular entertainment, digital technology, and advertising of previous decades. Visually, it incorporates 1990s web design and imagery, glitch art, anime, stylized Ancient Greek or Roman sculptures, Memphis Design geometric shapes, 3D-rendered objects, and cyberpunk tropes in its cover artwork and music videos.

Vaporwave originated as an ironic variant of chillwave, which was one of the first music genres to develop primarily through the internet. The style also evolved from 2000s post-noise and hypnagogic pop trends as well as similar retro-revivalist and post-internet motifs that had become fashionable in underground digital music and art scenes of the era, such as Tumblr's seapunk. The genre was pioneered by producers such as James Ferraro, Daniel Lopatin, and Ramona Langley, who each used various pseudonyms. Preceded by Lopatin's Chuck Person's Eccojams Vol. 1 and Ferraro's Far Side Virtual, Langley's 2011 album Floral Shoppe established a blueprint for the genre, and the movement subsequently built an audience on sites such as Last.fm, Reddit, and 4chan, while a flood of new acts, also operating under online pseudonyms, turned to Bandcamp for distribution.

Following the wider exposure of vaporwave in 2012, a wealth of subgenres and offshoots emerged, such as future funk, mallsoft, signalwave, vapornoise, utopian virtual, late night lo-fi, vaportrap, slushwave, and hardvapour, although most have waned in popularity. The genre also intersected with fashion trends such as streetwear and various political movements. After the mid-2010s, vaporwave was frequently described as a "dead" genre. The general public came to view it as a facetious internet meme, a notion that frustrated some producers who wished to be recognized as serious artists. While claims that vaporwave is dead have followed the genre since its inception, the musical style continues to evolve and branch and maintains healthy album sales well into the 2020s.

Later in the 2010s, the genre spawned a viral internet trend known as Simpsonwave along with a revival of interest in Japanese ambient music and city pop. Political offshoots of the style, such as fashwave and juchewave emerged, while in the early 2020s, styles such as "barber beats" gained popularity.

== Characteristics ==
Vaporwave is a hyper-specific subgenre, or "microgenre", that is both a form of electronic music and an art style; however, it is sometimes suggested to be primarily a visual medium. The genre is defined largely by its surrounding subculture, with its music inextricable from its visual accoutrements. Academic Laura Glitsos writes, "In this way, vaporwave defies traditional music conventions that typically privilege the music over the visual form." Musically, vaporwave reconfigures dance music from the 1980s and early 1990s through the use of chopped and screwed techniques, repetition, and heavy reverb. It is composed almost entirely from slowed-down samples and its creation requires only the knowledge of rudimentary production techniques. However, some artists like Dan Mason create vaporwave music from scratch.

The name derives from "vaporware", a term for commercial software that is announced but never released. It builds upon the satirical tendencies of chillwave and hypnagogic pop, while also being associated with an ambiguous or ironic take on consumer capitalism and technoculture. Critic Adam Trainer writes of the style's predilection for "music made less for enjoyment than for the regulation of mood", such as corporate stock music for infomercials and product demonstrations. Academic Adam Harper described the typical vaporwave track as "a wholly synthesised or heavily processed chunk of corporate mood music, bright and earnest or slow and sultry, often beautiful, either looped out of sync and beyond the point of functionality."

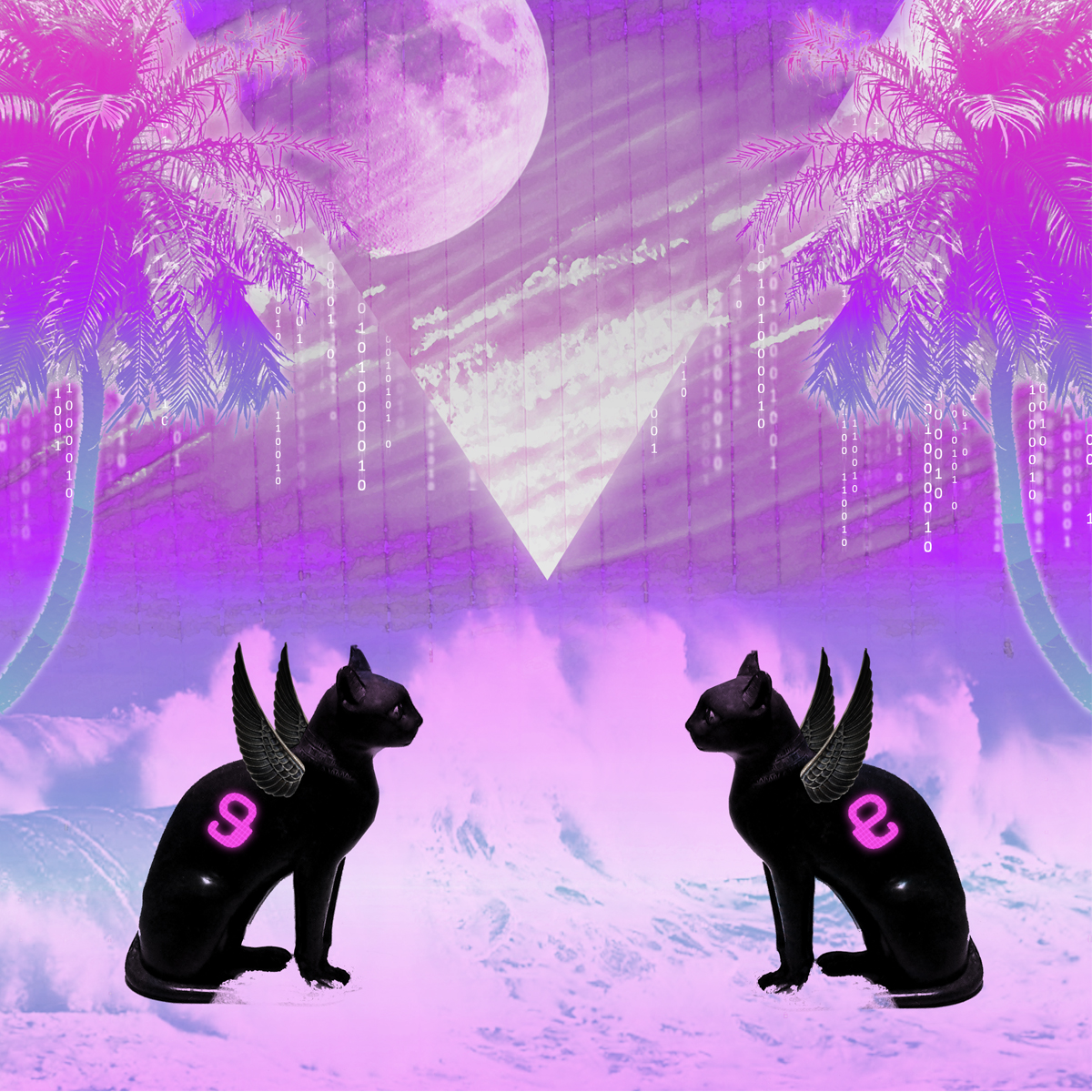
Vaporwave artwork

Adding to its dual engagement with musical and visual art forms, vaporwave embraces the Internet as a cultural, social, and aesthetic medium. The visual aesthetic (often stylized as "ＡＥＳＴＨＥＴＩＣＳ", with fullwidth characters) incorporates 1990s Web design and imagery, glitch art, and cyberpunk tropes, as well as anime, Greco-Roman statues, Memphis Milano geometric shapes, and 3D-rendered objects. VHS degradation is another common effect seen in vaporwave art. Generally, artists limit the chronology of their source material between Japan's economic flourishing in the 1980s and the September 11 attacks or dot-com bubble burst of 2001 (some albums, including Floral Shoppe, depict the intact Twin Towers on their covers). One vaporwave album that directly interrogates 9/11 is News at 11 (2016) by Cat System Corp. However, some vaporwave projects do use more recent samples; one example is John Zobele's 2017 album Social Justice Whatever, which primarily utilizes samples dating to the late 2000s and early 2010s.

== History and legacy ==
=== Precursors ===
Pitchfork reviewed the album Life's a Gas (1996) by German musician Wolfgang Voigt under the name Love Inc. as evoking "the approach vaporwave producers would take 15 years later, stripping bits of ephemeral radio pop down to ghostly patinas and examining our relationships with the stray songs that rattle around in our memories."

=== Origins ===
Vaporwave originated on the Internet in the early 2010s as an ironic variant of chillwave and as a derivation of the work of hypnagogic pop artists like Ariel Pink and the "post-noise psychedelia" of James Ferraro and Spencer Clark's the Skaters, Pocahaunted and Emeralds, who were also characterized by the invocation of retro popular culture. It was one of many Internet microgenres to emerge in this era, alongside witch house, seapunk, shitgaze, cloud rap, and others. Vaporwave coincided with a broader trend involving young artists whose works drew from their childhoods in the 1980s. (Note: This included the synthwave music genre, also known as "outrun", although the latter term was later used to refer more generally to retro 1980s aesthetics such as VHS tracking artifacts, magenta neon, and gridlines.)

"Chillwave" and "hypnagogic pop" were coined at virtually the same time, in mid-2009, and were initially considered interchangeable terms, though later differentiated after their styles perceptibly narrowed. Like vaporwave, they engaged with notions of nostalgia and cultural memory. Among the earliest hypnagogic acts to anticipate vaporwave was Matrix Metals and his album Flamingo Breeze (2009), which was built on synthesizer loops. Around the same time, Daniel Lopatin (Oneohtrix Point Never) uploaded a collection of plunderphonics loops to YouTube surreptitiously under the alias sunsetcorp. These clips were taken from his audio-visual album Memory Vague (June 2009). (Note: Author Emile Frankel cited the work as "a seminal release" and argued that Lopatin had captured "the affect of vaporwave" even earlier with the "highly influential" electronic album Betrayed in the Octagon (2007).) Washed Out's "Feel It All Around" (June 2009), which slowed down the 1983 Italian dance song "I Want You" by Gary Low, exemplified the "analog nostalgia" of chillwave that vaporwave artists sought to reconfigure.

"A1" from Eccojams Vol. 1 (2010)
A track from Daniel Lopatin's Eccojams, an album which pitch-shifts and distorts 1980s pop music. The sample in this excerpt is "Africa" by Toto.

Vaporwave was subsumed under a larger "Tumblr aesthetic" that had become fashionable in underground digital music and art scenes of the 2010s. In 2010, Lopatin included several of the tracks from Memory Vague, as well as a few new ones, on his album Chuck Person's Eccojams Vol. 1, released in August under the alias "Chuck Person". With packaging that resembled the 1993 video game Ecco the Dolphin, the album inspired a host of suburban teens and young adults to formulate what would become vaporwave. Seapunk followed in mid-2011 as an aquatic-themed Tumblr subculture and Internet meme that presaged vaporwave in its concern for "spacey" electronic music and GeoCities web graphics. Like vaporwave, it was defined by its engagement with the Internet, an approach that is sometimes described as post-Internet.

The musical template for vaporwave came from Eccojams and Ferraro's Far Side Virtual (October 2011). Eccojams featured chopped and screwed variations on popular 1980s pop songs, while Far Side Virtual drew primarily on "the grainy and bombastic beeps" of then-recent past media, such as Skype, Second Life, Windows XP and the Nintendo Wii. According to Stereogum's Miles Bowe, vaporwave was a fusion between Lopatin's "chopped and screwed plunderphonics" and the "nihilistic easy-listening of James Ferraro's Muzak-hellscapes". A 2013 post on a music blog presented those albums, along with Skeleton's Holograms (November 2010), as "proto vaporwave".

=== Early scene ===
Vaporwave artists were originally "mysterious and often nameless entities that lurk the internet," Adam Harper noted, "often behind a pseudo-corporate name or web façade, and whose music is typically free to download through MediaFire, Last FM, SoundCloud or Bandcamp." According to Metallic Ghosts (Chaz Allen), the original vaporwave scene came out of an online circle formulated on the site Turntable.fm. This circle included individuals known as Internet Club (Robin Burnett), Veracom, Luxury Elite, Infinity Frequencies, Transmuteo (Jonathan Dean), Coolmemoryz, and Prismcorp.

Numerous producers of this online milieu took inspiration from Ramona Langley's New Dreams Ltd. (credited to "Laserdisc Visions", July 2011). The first reported use of the term "vaporwave" was in an October 2011 blog post by an anonymous user reviewing the album Surf's Pure Hearts by Girlhood; however, Burnett has been credited with coining the term as a way to tie the circle together. Langley's Floral Shoppe (credited to "Macintosh Plus", December 2011) was the first album to be properly considered of the genre, containing all of the style's core elements.

Vaporwave found wider appeal over the middle of 2012, building an audience on sites like Last.fm, Reddit and 4chan. On Tumblr, it became common for users to decorate their pages with vaporwave imagery. In September, Blank Banshee released his debut album, Blank Banshee 0, which reflected a trend of vaporwave producers who were more influenced by trap music and less concerned with conveying political undertones. Bandwagon called it a "progressive record" that, along with Floral Shoppe, "signaled the end of the first wave of sample-heavy music, and ... reconfigured what it means to make vaporwave music.

After a flood of new vaporwave acts turned to Bandcamp for distribution, various online music publications such as Tiny Mix Tapes, Dummy Mag and Sputnikmusic began covering the movement. However, writers, fans, and artists struggled to differentiate between vaporwave, chillwave, and hypnagogic pop, while Ash Becks of The Essential noted that larger sites like Pitchfork and Drowned in Sound "seemingly refused to touch vaporwave throughout the genre's two-year 'peak'." Common criticisms were that the genre was either "too dumb" or "too intellectual". (Note: Journalist Miles Bowe recalled that when he was an intern at Stereogum in 2013, "vaporwave felt nearly impossible to explain to friends, let alone pitch to an editor.")

=== Wider popularity ===
In November 2012, seapunk aesthetics were appropriated in music videos by the pop singers Rihanna and Azealia Banks. The exposure catapulted the subculture to the mainstream, and with it, vaporwave. That same month, a video review of Floral Shoppe, published by the YouTuber Anthony Fantano, helped solidify the album as the representative work of vaporwave, but was also credited as a pivotal moment in the decline of the genre. Soon after vaporwave was spotlighted in the mainstream, it was frequently described as a "dead" genre. Such pronouncements came from the fans themselves.

Following the initial wave, new terms were invented by users on 4chan and Reddit who sought to separate vaporwave into multiple subgenres. Some were created in jest, such as "vaportrap", "vapornoise" and "vaporgoth". Further subgenres included "eccojams", "utopian virtual", "mallsoft", "future funk", "post-Internet", "late-nite lo-fi", "broken transmission" (or "signalwave"), and "hardvapour". Joe Price of Complex reported that "most [of the subgenres] faded away, and many didn't make sense to begin with. ... The visual aspect formed faster than the sound, resulting in releases that look the same but fail to form a sonically cohesive whole." Cloud rap artists like Bones, Black Kray, Xavier Wulf and GothBoiClique drew influence from vaporwave and witch house, with genre boundaries not becoming distinctly defined until later.

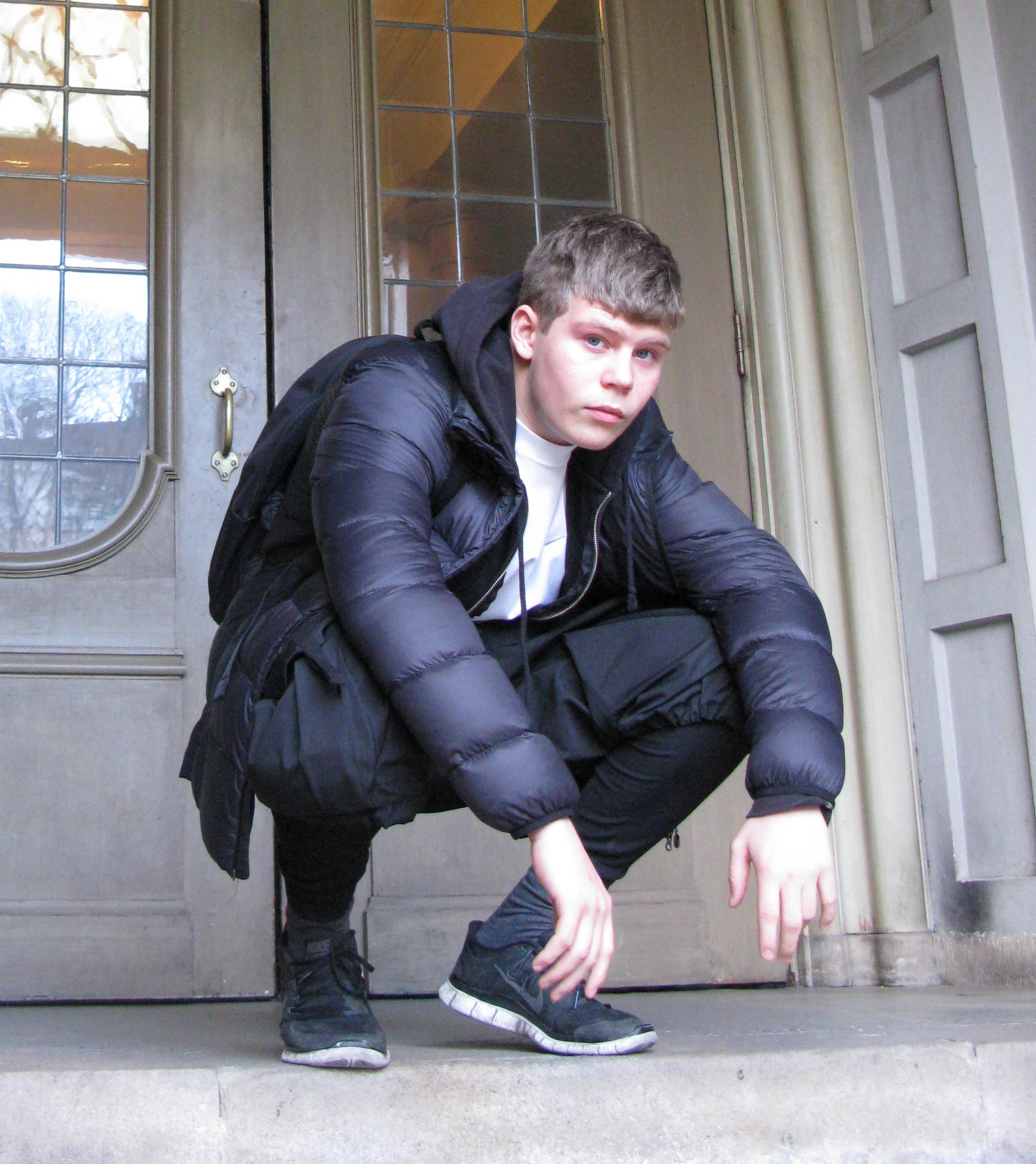
Yung Lean (pictured 2013) popularized fusions of vaporwave with rap music.

In 2013, YouTube began allowing its users to host live streams, which resulted in a host of 24-hour "radio stations" dedicated to microgenres such as vaporwave and lo-fi hip hop. The Swedish rapper Yung Lean and his Sad Boys collective inspired a wave of anonymous DJs to create vaporwave mixes, uploaded to YouTube and SoundCloud, that appropriated the music and imagery of Nintendo 64 video games. Titles included "Mariowave", "Nostalgia 64", and "ＺＥＬＤＡＷＡＶＥ" Dazed Digital's Evelyn Wang credited Lean with "allowing vaporwave to leak IRL [and] encouraging its unholy coupling with streetwear". She cited their associated fashion staples as "frowny faces, Japanese and Arabic as accessories, sportswear brands, Arizona iced tea, and the uncanny ability to simultaneously communicate in and be a meme." (Note: Responding to the memes of Lean's music video for "Hurt" (2015), Arizona Beverage Company collaborated with Adidas on a sneaker design based on the turquoise and pink can design of Arizona 99-cent teas that had become "a vaporwave standard".)

At the end of 2013, Thump published an essay headlined "Is Vaporwave the Next Seapunk?". Although the author prophesied that vaporwave would not end "as a joke" the way seapunk did, the genre came to be largely viewed as a facetious Internet meme based predominately on a retro visual style or "vibe", a notion that frustrated some producers who wished to be recognized as serious artists. Many of the most influential artists and record labels associated with the genre later drifted into other musical styles.

In 2015, Rolling Stone published a list that included vaporwave act 2814 as one of "10 artists you need to know", citing their album Birth of a New Day (新しい日の誕生) as "an unparalleled success within a small, passionate pocket of the internet." The album I'll Try Living Like This by Death's Dynamic Shroud.wmv was featured at number fifteen on the Fact list "The 50 Best Albums of 2015", and on the same day MTV International introduced a rebrand heavily inspired by vaporwave and seapunk, Tumblr launched a GIF viewer named Tumblr TV, with an explicitly MTV-styled visual spin. Hip-hop artist Drake's single "Hotline Bling", released on July 31, also became popular with vaporwave producers, inspiring both humorous and serious remixes of the tune.

As of 2016, vaporwave albums, including Floral Shoppe, continued to rank among the best-selling experimental albums on Bandcamp. The scene also maintained a dedicated following on communities such as Reddit. Price reported that, for those outside of these arenas, the genre was generally considered to be "a big joke". He added that "Users of the various vaporwave sub-Reddits will always take it very seriously for the most part, but even there people are discussing whether or not vaporwave is still going strong." (Note: Harper wrote in 2017 that the genre's demise was merely a popular talking point, as it is contradicted by the wealth of releases that still appeared on Bandcamp. Price commented that these releases were only observed by those who are "constantly checking the vaporwave charts" and cited "countless parody albums of Floral Shoppe, to the point in which there are even full Bandcamp pages dedicated to these innocuous releases.") Despite their objections to the label, serious artists of the movement continued to be tagged as vaporwave.

In 2019, user comments that state "ＡＥＳＴＨＥＴＩＣ" remained ubiquitous on YouTube videos concerning the Internet. George Clanton, a prominent figure in the genre, commented that the "vaporwave" banner still functioned well as a marketing tag for music that is not necessarily considered of the genre. In September, he organized the first-ever vaporwave festival, 100% ElectroniCON, in New York City, where various artists associated with the genre such as Saint Pepsi, Vaperror, Nmesh, 18 Carat Affair, and Clanton himself performed live, most of them for the first time in their careers.

=== Political appropriations ===
In December 2012, Dummy published what was considered the "definitive" article on vaporwave, authored by Adam Harper, in which he equated the genre to accelerationist political theory. The article inspired "a wave of content ambiguously celebrating a dystopian capitalism". In early 2016, the satirical publication Rave News reported that prominent vaporwave producers had scheduled an emergency summit in Montreal to discuss "creeping fascism" in the scene. Although the article was facetious, its comment section attracted many vaporwave fans who defended such political beliefs. In August, Daily Stormer founder Andrew Anglin recommended that alt-right members embrace synthwave instead of the rock genres traditionally associated with far-right movements, as he felt that synthwave represented the "Whitest music ever". His remarks popularized the musical and visual aesthetic dubbed "fashwave", an updating of fascist tropes inspired by vaporwave that was celebrated by many members of the alt-right.

In 2017, Vice's Penn Bullock and Eli Penn reported on the phenomenon of self-identified fascists and alt-right members appropriating vaporwave music and aesthetics, describing the fashwave movement as "the first fascist music that is easy enough on the ears to have mainstream appeal" and reflective of "a global cybernetic subculture geared towards millennials, propagated by memes like Pepe the Frog, and centered on sites like 4chan". (Note: They also wrote that Trumpwave exploits vaporwave's perceived ambivalence towards the corporate culture it engages with, allowing it to recast Trump as "the modern-day inheritor of the mythologized 80s, a decade that is taken to stand for racial purity and unleashed capitalism".) The Guardian's Michael Hann noted that the movement is not unprecedented; similar offshoots occurred in punk rock in the 1980s and black metal in the 1990s. Hann believed that, like those genres, there was little chance fashwave would ever "impinge on the mainstream".

By 2019, pink vaporwave-inspired hats that promoted 2020 presidential candidate Andrew Yang became popular among his supporters. National Review commentator Theodore Kopfre reported that it was part of a trend indicating that Yang had "replaced Donald Trump as the meme candidate."

In 2026, CBC News reported that 47th U.S. president Donald Trump had published fascist vaporwave edits, known as "fashwave", to the White House's social media account, with some edits referencing Right Wing Death Squad.

== Critical interpretations ==
=== Parody, subversion, and genre ===
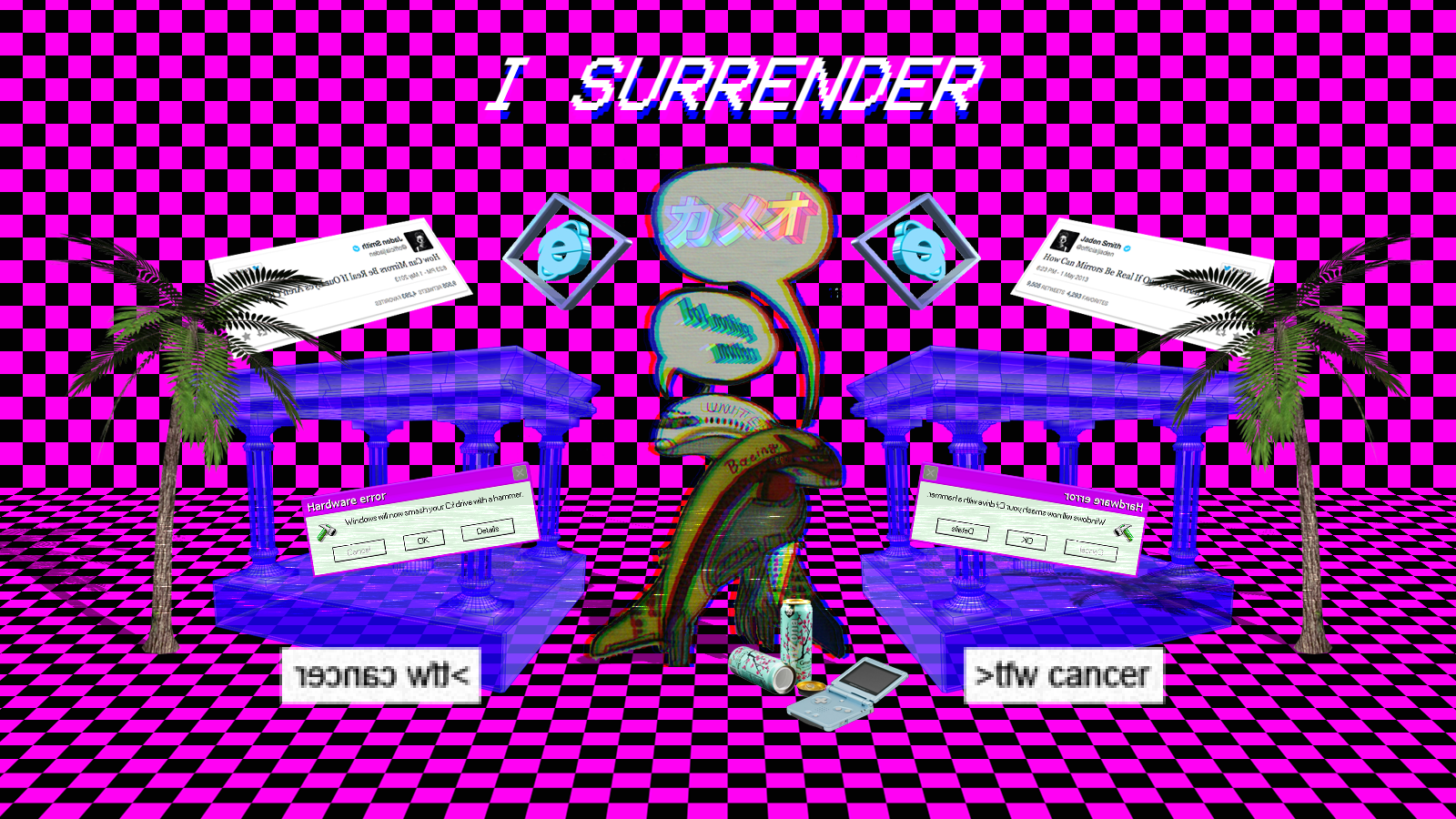
Vaporwave-style image using elements of Windows 95

Vaporwave was one of several microgenres spawned in the early 2010s that were the brief focus of media attention. Users on various music forums, as quoted by Vice, variously characterized the genre as "chillwave for Marxists", "post-elevator music", and "corporate smooth jazz Windows 95 pop". Its circulation was more akin to an Internet meme than typical music genres of the past, as authors Georgina Born and Christopher Haworth wrote in 2017,

Vaporwave's cultural practices knowingly replicate and parody the addictive, almost compulsory participation that feeds social networks, where the voluntary labor of the user community drives the system and generates value. Anyone with an Internet connection can produce vaporwave ... The uniformity of these memes is encouraged by their rapid imitation among the genre's hyperactive online subculture, fueled by affective contagion.

Pitchfork contributor Jonny Coleman defined vaporwave as residing in "the uncanny genre valley" that lies "between a real genre that sounds fake and a fake genre that could be real." Also from Pitchfork, Patrick St. Michel calls vaporwave a "niche corner of Internet music populated by Westerners goofing around with Japanese music, samples, and language". Vice writer Rob Arcand commented that the "rapid proliferation of subgenres has itself become part of the "vaporwave" punchline, gesturing at the absurdity of the genre itself even as it sees artists using it as a springboard for innovation."

Speaking about the "supposedly subversive or parodic elements" of vaporwave in 2018, cultural critic Simon Reynolds said that the genre had been made redundant, in some respects, by modern trap music and mainstream hip hop. He opined: "What could be more insane or morbid than the subjectivity in a Drake record or a Kanye song? The black Rap n B mainstream is further out sonically and attitudinally than anything the white Internet-Bohemia has come up with. Their role is redundant. Rap and R&B ... is already the Simulacrum, is already decadence."

In a 2018 Rolling Stone article that reported the Monkees' Mike Nesmith's enthusiasm for the genre, author Andy Greene described vaporwave as a "fringe electronic subgenre that few outside irony-soaked meme enthusiasts have even heard of, let alone developed an opinion on." Nesmith praised the genre and attributed its sound to be highly reminiscent of psychedelic trips.

Music critic Scott Beauchamp wrote that vaporwave's stance is more focused on loss, the notion of lassitude, and passive acquiescence, and that "vaporwave was the first musical genre to live its entire life from birth to death completely online". He suggested that expressions of hypermodulation – precisely tuned "micro-experiences" resulting from social media algorithms funneling different people with similar interests into obscure topics – inspired both the development and downfall of vaporwave.

=== Capitalism and technology ===
It initiates a lot of important conversations about power and money in the industry. Or ... everything just sounds good slowed down with reverb?

— Aaran David Ross of Gatekeeper, speaking about vaporwave

Vaporwave is cited for espousing an ambiguous or accelerationist relationship to consumer capitalism. A popular trend within its audience from 2015 to 2019 was to use vaporwave songs and music videos to escape reality by observing and remixing commercial products and popular trends of the past. Numerous academic books have been published on this subject, a trend that was provoked by Adam Harper's 2012 Dummy article and its attempt to link the genre to punk rock and anti-capitalist gestures. In the article, he wrote that vaporwave producers "can be read as sarcastic anti-capitalists revealing the lies and slippages of modern techno-culture and its representations, or as its willing facilitators, shivering with delight upon each new wave of delicious sound." (Note: Langley described her 2012 album Contemporary Sapporo (札幌コンテンポラリー) as "a brief glimpse into the new possibilities of international communication" and "a parody of American hypercontextualization of e-Asia circa 1995". Critic Simon Reynolds characterized Daniel Lopatin's Chuck Person project as "relat[ing] to cultural memory and the buried utopianism within capitalist commodities, especially those related to consumer technology in the computing and audio/video entertainment area".) He noted that the name itself was both a nod to vaporware and the idea of libidinal energy being subjected to relentless sublimation under capitalism.

Philosopher Grafton Tanner wrote, "vaporwave is one artistic style that seeks to rearrange our relationship with electronic media by forcing us to recognize the unfamiliarity of ubiquitous technology ... vaporwave is the music of 'non-times' and 'non-places' because it is skeptical of what consumer culture has done to time and space". Commenting on the adoption of a vaporwave- and seapunk-inspired rebrand by MTV International, Jordan Pearson of Motherboard, Vice's technology website, noted how "the cynical impulse that animated vaporwave and its associated Tumblr-based aesthetics is co-opted and erased on both sides—where its source material originates and where it lives". Beauchamp proposed a parallel between punk's "No Future" stance and its active "raw energy of dissatisfaction" deriving from the historical lineage of Dada dystopia, and vaporwave's preoccupation with "political failure and social anomie".

Michelle Lhooq of Vice argued that "parodying commercial taste isn't exactly the goal. Vaporwave doesn't just recreate corporate lounge music – it plumps it up into something sexier and more synthetic." In his 2019 book Hearing the Cloud: Can Music Help Reimagine The Future?, academic Emile Frankel wrote that vaporwave was reduced to "a commercial shell of itself" by those who fetishized the 1980s and "retro synth-pop". He likened the scene to PC Music, a label that "was seen to warp from an ironic affirmation of commercialism, to become just regular pop. ... Anything that uses irony as a method of critique runs the risk of misrecognition."

== Offshoots and subgenres ==
=== Eccojams ===
Eccojams (also known as echo jams) is a microgenre and early progenitor of vaporwave originally coined by musician Daniel Lopatin with the release of Chuck Person's Eccojams Vol. 1 (2010). According to Lopatin, the style began as a simple exercise in looping a slowed-down segment of a song while adding vibrating echoes. It would become an influence on early vaporwave artists such as b0dyg0d, Ramona Langley, INTERNET CLUB, MediaFired and EEGPROGRAMS, with Lopatin describing the style as "a DIY practice that didn't involve any specialized music tech knowledge".

=== Vapor ===
In 2025, the Vaporwave News Network stated that the term "vapor" was an umbrella genre, citing Rate Your Music's entry for the term, or a "meta-genre", while citing writer Roy Shuker's book Popular Music Culture: The Key Concepts' definition of "meta-genre". The publication stated that vapor "unites around the digital appropriation of recontextualized signifiers and sounds. It points to something greater than the formation of a static music genre- it's like a cloud of particles that when grouped together form something you can almost see, feel, and touch but is also destined for entropy and will eventually scatter into many different directions".

=== Future funk ===
Future funk is a French house-inspired offshoot that expands upon the disco and house elements of vaporwave. It involves much of the same visual imagery drawn from 1980s and 1990s anime, with reference points including Urusei Yatsura, Super Dimension Fortress Macross, Kimagure Orange Road, and Sailor Moon. Musically, future funk is produced in the same sample-based manner as vaporwave, albeit with a more upbeat approach. Most of the music samples are drawn from Japanese city pop records from the 1980s and 1990s, and the genre has led to an increased exposure of city pop music to Western audiences.

Some of the most popular future funk artists include Macross 82-99, who pioneered the genre with his Sailorwave album series in 2013, Other artists described as being the most popular in future funk include Skylar Spence (aka Saint Pepsi), Tsundere Alley, Ducat, Yung Bae, and Night Tempo.

=== Simpsonwave ===
Simpsonwave is an Internet aesthetic and YouTube phenomenon that emerged in the mid-2010s. In late 2015, user Spicster uploaded an edit of the American animated television series The Simpsons to the song "Resonance" by HOME onto Vine. The video went viral and sparked a trend featuring scenes from The Simpsons paired with various vaporwave tracks. In 2016, users Midge and Lucien Hughes further developed and popularized the movement with the use of clips often edited out of context with VHS-style distortion effects and surreal visuals, creating a "hallucinatory and transportive" atmosphere.

=== Late night lo-fi ===
Late night lo-fi (or late-nite lo-fi) is a subgenre featuring slowed-down 1980s pop and jazz that emulates recorded programs on old 4:3 televisions. Its main progenitor is Luxury Elite, known for her music's high-class aesthetic.

=== VHS pop ===
VHS pop is a more upbeat variant of late night lo-fi characterized by a richer sound and vibrant, nostalgic aesthetics.

=== Utopian virtual ===
Utopian virtual is an offshoot of vaporwave originally coined by musician James Ferraro with the release of Far Side Virtual (2011), which showcased Ferraro's concept of a “virtual life soundtrack,” combining crisp, unreal early 3D computer graphics with vaporwave textures. The style later became associated with the Frutiger Aero Internet aesthetic.

=== Signalwave ===
Signalwave (or broken transmission) samples and distorts radio broadcasts, television programs, and station idents, particularly from The Weather Channel. Representative artists include 猫 シ Corp and CT57.

=== Slushwave ===
Slushwave is the ambient branch of vaporwave, creating immersive soundscapes with extended tracks often exceeding 10 minutes. Notable artists include t e l e p a t h テレパシー能力者, SOARER, and desert sand feels warm at night, with many albums being released on the label Geometric Lullaby.

=== Hardvapour ===
Hardvapour emerged in late 2015 as a reimagination of vaporwave with darker themes, faster tempos, and heavier sounds. It is influenced by speedcore and gabber, and defines itself against the utopian moods sometimes attributed to vaporwave. Hardvapour artists include wosX and Subhumanizer.

=== Mallsoft ===
Mallsoft amplifies vaporwave's lounge influences. It may be viewed in connection to "the concept of malls as large, soulless spaces of consumerism ... exploring the social ramifications of capitalism and globalization". Popular mallsoft artists include Disconscious, Groceries, Hantasi, and Cat System Corp. (known for his 2016 9/11 tribute album News at 11).

=== Fashwave ===
Fashwave (from "fascist") is a largely instrumental fusion of synthwave and vaporwave that originated on YouTube circa 2015. Artists include Cybernazi, Xurious, Andrew Anglin, and Elessar. It is also been described as an extremist subset of the non-extremist latter promoted by neo-Nazis. With political track titles and occasional soundbites, the genre combines Nazi symbolism with the visuals associated with vaporwave and synthwave. According to Hann, it is musically derived from synthwave, while Heavy contributor Paul Farrell writes that it is "considered to be an offshoot from the harmless vaporwave movement." The visual aesthetic of fashwave, consisting of typical vaporwave elements mixed with fascist symbols like the black sun, odal rune, or crusader imagery, has been associated with the "Dark MAGA" imagery surrounding Trump and Ron DeSantis. It has been parodied by anti-fascists, such as with the Dark Brandon meme, a mocking imitation of the "Dark MAGA" imagery surrounding Trump.

In 2023, the DeSantis campaign let go of their campaign director, after it was publicized that a campaign aide had created a DeSantis "fan edit" featuring the black sun symbol. In late 2025 and early 2026, videos posted on social media by both the United States Department of Labor and the Department of Homeland Security has been described as resembling fashwave.

=== Juchewave ===
Juchewave (from “Juche”) is a version of vaporwave that idealises North Korea, especially popular culture of the 1980s in North Korea. The movement combines music, often North Korean popular music, with nostalgic and vaporwave-like clips of the North Korean capital, Pyongyang, as well as other DPRK-related forms of media.

=== Barber beats ===
Barber beats was originally coined and popularized by artists such as Haircuts for Men and Macroblank. The subgenre heavily samples and slows down smooth jazz, lounge music, and R&B from the 1980s to the early 2000s.

== See also ==
- Analog horror – Subgenre of horror fiction
- Bisexual lighting – Pink, purple, and blue lighting
- Criticism of capitalism – Arguments against the economic system of capitalism
- Culture jamming – Form of protest to subvert media culture
- Dead mall – Deteriorating or largely vacant shopping mall
- Digitality – Condition of living in a digital culture
- Doomer wave – Music subgenre based on Wojak doomer Internet meme
- Hyperconsumerism – Consumption of goods beyond ones necessities
- Hyperreality – Term for cultural process of shifting ideas of reality
- Internet art – Form of art distributed on the Internet
- Lofi hip hop – Subgenre of hip-hop
- Mashup music – Composition blending prerecorded tracks
- Massurrealism – Art movement started in the 1990s
- Memphis Group – Italian design collective
- Minimalist music – Music using limited or minimal materials
- New wave music – Music genre from the 1970s and 1980s
- Postmodern music – Music of the postmodern era
- Postdigital – Artistic movement
- Production music – Stock music for film and TV
- Post-Internet (music) – Music inspired by the post-Internet art movement
- Remix culture – Culture encouraging the creation of derivative works
- Sampling (music) – Reuse of sound recording in another recording
- Scratch video – 1980s British video art movement
- Slowed and reverb – Music genre and technique of remixing music
- Synth-pop – Music genre in which the synthesizer is the main instrument
- Sovietwave – Subgenre of synthwave
- Y2K aesthetic – Internet aesthetic
- Yacht rock – Neologism for 1970s–1980s soft rock music style
- Yuppie – Short for "young urban professional"

== Bibliography ==
- Born, Georgina; Haworth, Christopher (2017). "Mixing It: Digital Ethnography and Online Research Methods--A Tale of Two Global Digital Music Genres". In Hjorth, Larissa; Horst, Heather; Galloway, Anne (eds.). The Routledge Companion to Digital Ethnography. Taylor & Francis. ISBN 978-1-317-37778-8.
- Brown, Michael (2025). Eyeliner's Buy Now: 33 1/3 Oceania. Bloomsbury. ISBN 9781501397820.
- Frankel, Emile (2019). Hearing the Cloud: Can Music Help Reimagine The Future?. John Hunt Publishing. ISBN 978-1-78535-839-5.
- Glitsos, Laura (2019). Somatechnics and Popular Music in Digital Contexts. Springer Nature. ISBN 978-3-030-18122-2.
- Harper, Adam (2017). "Personal Take: Vaporwave Is Dead, Long Live Vaporwave!". In Cook, Nicholas; Ingalls, Monique M.; Trippett, David (eds.). The Cambridge Companion to Music in Digital Culture. Cambridge University Press. ISBN 978-1-107-16178-8.
- Reynolds, Simon (2011). Retromania: Pop Culture's Addiction to Its Own Past. Farrar, Straus and Giroux. ISBN 978-1-4299-6858-4. Archived from the original on February 16, 2017.
- Stevens, Anne H.; O'Donnell, Molly C., eds. (2020). The Microgenre: A Quick Look at Small Culture. Bloomsbury Publishing. ISBN 978-1-5013-4583-8.
- Tanner, Grafton (2016). Babbling Corpse: Vaporwave and the Commodification of Ghosts. John Hunt Publishing. ISBN 978-1-78279-760-9. Archived from the original on April 2, 2017.
- Trainer, Adam (2016). "From Hypnagogia to Distroid: Postironic Musical Renderings of Personal Memory". The Oxford Handbook of Music and Virtuality. Oxford University Press. ISBN 978-0-19-932128-5.
