= Ultrademon =

- Origin: Kansas City, Missouri, U.S.
- Genres: Experimental, Electronic
- Years active: 2010–present
- Labels: Transatlantic Records, Rephlex Records, Soft Architecture

Lilium Redwine, known by her recording alias Ultrademon, is an American experimental electronic musician.

== Career ==
Ultrademon released her debut album (titled Seapunk) via Aphex Twin's Rephlex Records in 2013, followed by a Japanese re-release in the same year. This album popularized the eponymous Seapunk aesthetic which saw some popularity in the mid-to-late 2010s.

In 2016, Redwine moved from Chicago to Tokyo, later moving to Kyoto in April of 2019.

With the release of 2019's Chamber Music, Redwine's style took a turn towards experimental, deconstructed club sound. This album as well as the subsequent æði (2022) and Crone (2024) carry a distinct "medieval" sound with gothic and black metal inspired sound and samples taken from nature or swordfighting. In a 2019 interview with Bandcamp she stated: “If you’re comparing it to the [other] Ultrademon work I put out,” she continues, “[Chamber Music] is stepping away from any sort of idea of it being club music. I would say was that why it’s so personal. It covers a period and time in my life where I felt like I was in the middle of a bunch of warring factions, and it invoked this sort of feudalism. It felt like I was in the middle of the battle, and it kind of evoked this neo-gothic, Baroque landscape.”

Currently, Redwine's Bandcamp page states she is living in Berlin, Germany but it is unclear when she made this move.

== Discography ==
- Step into Liquid (2012): Fire for Effect Records, Rephlex
- Seapunk (2013): Fire for Effect Records, Rephlex Records
- Voidic Charms (2014): Coral Records Internazionale
- Pirate Utopias (2014): Faded Audio
- Durian Rider (2015): Coral Records Internazionale
- Chamber Music (2019): Soft Architecture
- Remember (2020): Soft Architecture
- æði (aethi) (2022): Transatlantic Records
- Crone (2024): Soft Architecture
