= Fashwave =

Music and art genre

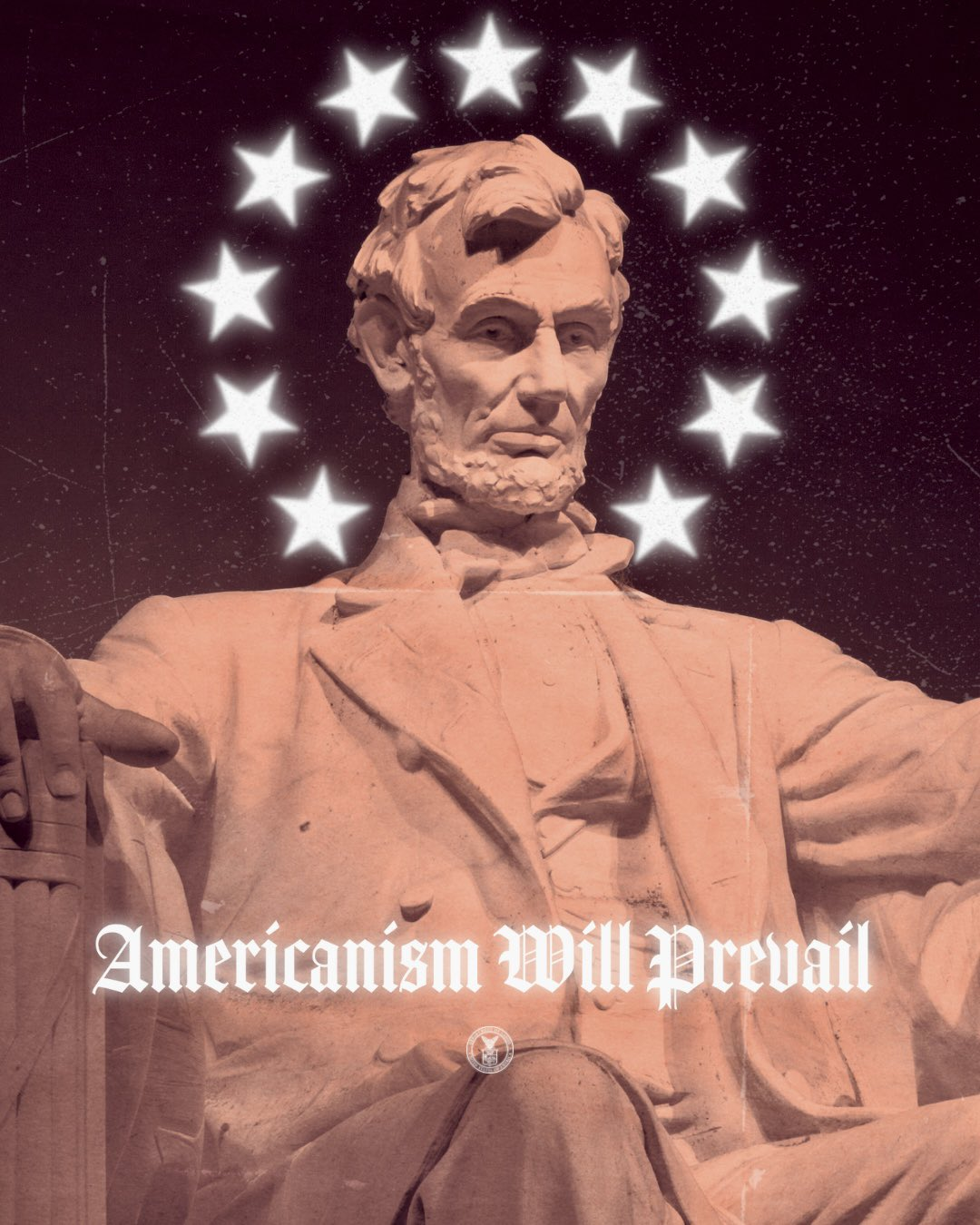
- A U.S. Department of Labor image using vaporwave-inspired design and nationalist iconography, echoing fashwave's form of retrofuturism
- Etymology: Portmanteau of fascist and wave (as in vaporwave/synthwave)
- Stylistic origins: Hardstyle; Nightcore; Drum and Bass; Vaporwave; Eurodance; Italo disco; Hardcore Techno; Gabber; Speedcore; Witch house; Electronic music
- Typical instruments: Digital audio workstation; Sequencer; Synthesizer; Sampler; Audio editing software

Fashwave (a blend of "fascist" + "vaporwave") is an online-centric microgenre of electronic music and a visual art aesthetic associated with far-right extremism. Musically, it is largely instrumental and draws heavily from the synthwave/vaporwave sound palette of nostalgic 1980s-inspired synthesizer music. However, in a recent revival, Fashwave have taken more influence from Hardstyle and 1990s-era Eurodance. In isolation, the sound can seem innocuous or indistinguishable from its synthwave/vaporwave origins.

However, fashwave artists infuse the genre with overt fascist and white nationalist content through other means, primarily in titles, imagery, and sampled audio. While vocals are rare, many producers from its early introduction incorporate spoken-word samples from speeches by neo-Nazi figures, or contemporary radical right politicians, as well as militaristic sound effects.

== Characteristic ==
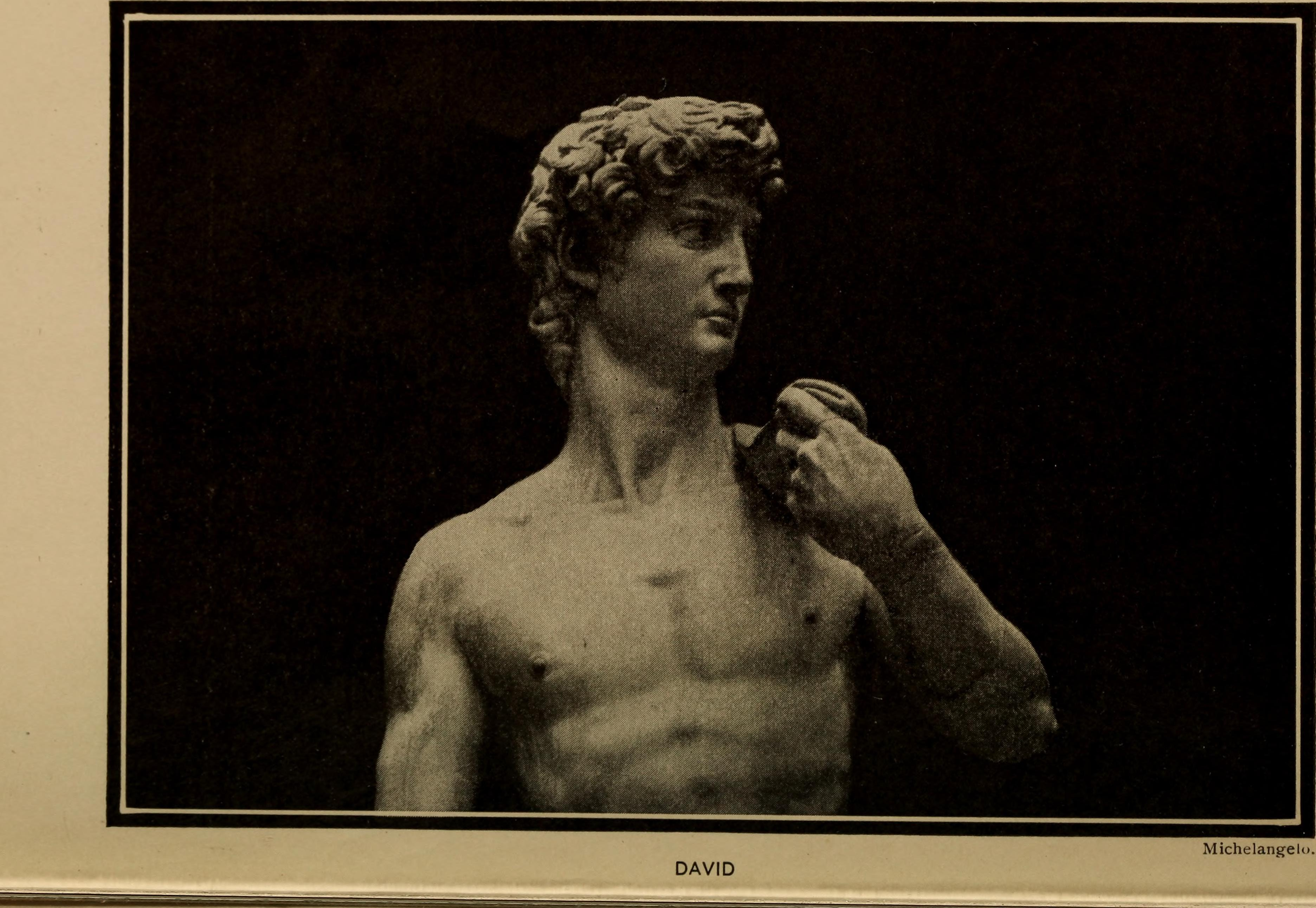
Unlike vaporwave's usage, white marble statues are common with Alt-Right groups such like the "Save Europe" movement.

Visually, fashwave is defined by a striking retrofuturistic aesthetic that closely mirrors the vaporwave/synthwave art style. Common motifs include neon grids extending toward a horizon, 1980s-style digital sunsets, outrun sci-fi cityscapes, chrome text and vaporwave's signature glitchy VHS tape effects. These are often juxtaposed or overlaid with explicit fascist iconography. Commonly the Black Sun (Sonnenrad) symbols, stylized Iron Crosses and other Nazi emblems, images of Hitler, Mussolini or other historical fascist leaders, and slogans like "Blood and Soil". Fashwave graphics freely appropriate the stock imagery of white supremacist propaganda for instance, idealized portraits of "traditional" white nuclear families and WWII-era imagery but rendered in lurid pastel color palettes with synthwave's "synthetic gloss" and layered irony. A recurring visual trope is the use of classical white Greco-Roman statues or busts, a visual icon taken from vaporwave art; in fashwave these marble figures are repurposed as exalted icons of an idealized Western civilization and racial heritage.

Fashwave music production tends to be DIY and digitally native. Tracks are often produced by anonymous or pseudonymous creators on platforms like YouTube, SoundCloud, and Bandcamp using common software tools, such like FL Studio, or other digital audio workstations, without much professional polish.

== See also ==
- Esoteric neo-Nazism
- Far-right subcultures
- Kirkification
- "We'll Have Our Home Again", used by United States Department of Homeland Security in recruiting ads
