= Rifts (album) =

Compilation album by Oneohtrix Point Never
- Released: October 20, 2009
- Recorded: 2003–2009
- Genres: Progressive electronic; ambient; hypnagogic
- Length: 145:08 (2009 release); 188:05 (2012 reissue)
- Labels: No Fun, Software

Oneohtrix Point Never chronology
Zones Without People (2009)	Rifts (2009)	Russian Mind (2009)

Reissue cover
- 2012 Software release cover

Rifts is a 2009 compilation album by Oneohtrix Point Never, the solo alias of Brooklyn electronic musician Daniel Lopatin. The album collects Lopatin's early synth-based recordings under the moniker dating back to 2003, including the three limited-run LPs Betrayed in the Octagon (2007), Zones Without People (2009) and Russian Mind (2009), as well as several additional cassette and CD-R releases. It was originally released on No Fun Productions in 2009 as a 2 disc set.

The initial issue of Rifts sold beyond expectations and brought Lopatin early critical praise; UK magazine The Wire named it the No. 2 album of 2009. In 2012, the album was reissued as an expanded 3 disc/5 LP set, including previously unreleased tracks, on Lopatin's own Software label.

== Recording and composition ==
Rifts collects Oneohtrix Point Never's electronic recordings dating back to 2003, primarily drawing from Lopatin's trilogy of limited-run LPs: Betrayed in the Octagon (2007), Zones Without People (2009), and Russian Mind (2009). He began exploring sounds inspired by '70s cosmic music and '80s new age during his time as part of Brooklyn's noise music scene in the early 2000s. Following the recording of Russian Mind in 2009 he noticed a "clear arc" between his three studio albums, which suggested the records were "basically a Stanislaw Lem-style trilogy of stories about vague metaphysical sci-fi."

The Roland Juno-60 analog synthesizer, which Lopatin inherited from his father, served as his primary instrument. He noted that "a ton of [the material on Rifts] is improvised. With the exception of sequencer based stuff, I record straight synth jams and then use that as source material which gets fleshed out and assembled on the computer." The compilation showcases Lopatin's distinctive approach to synthesizers, employing "ornate electronic arpeggios, often run through echo pedals, which spiral off into infinity with breathtaking effect." Tracks like "Format & Journey North" utilize samples taken from YouTube.

Describing the musical template of Rifts, Tiny Mix Tapes stated that "some will hear 80s soundtrack music, cosmic ambiance, or minimalist repetition, while others might pick up on the mishmash of noise and plastic, mystical new age music." Critic Simon Reynolds described these releases as involving "rippling arpeggiations, sweet melodies offset by sour dissonance, grid-like structures struggling with cloudy amorphousness." AllMusic wrote that "many of the song titles here feel like they could be the names of forgotten classics of '70s and '80s sci-fi films and literature." The track "Emil Cioran" is named after Romanian philosopher Emil Cioran, who Lopatin described as "one of my top dogs."

== Release ==
The 2009 edition of Rifts sold out its initial 2,000-unit pressing, far beyond expectations, and "propelled Lopatin to underground-star status." In 2012, it was reissued in an expanded 3-CD/5-LP edition on Mexican Summer and Lopatin's own Software label, including additional tracks and alternate sequencing. The 2012 LP version collects the bonus tracks of Rifts into the compilation albums Drawn and Quartered and The Fall into Time, which were themselves released separate from the box set in 2013. The 7 bonus tracks on the original version of Rifts ended up being the contents, in order, of Drawn and Quartered.

== Critical reception ==
Professional ratings
Review scores
Source	Rating
AllMusic	4/5 stars
The Line of Best Fit	8/10
Pitchfork Media	8.0/10 (original release); 8.7/10 (reissue)
PopMatters	9/10
Prefix Mag	9/10
The Quietus	(Very favourable)
Rolling Stone	3.5/5 stars
Sputnikmusic	4.7/5
Tiny Mix Tapes	4.5/5 stars

Despite its underground release, Rifts received widespread critical praise from a variety of publications. The Quietus located the album in a tradition of "chromed modernity and pulp futurism" rooted in the cultural milieu of the 1980s, describing the music as "acting like a cracked mirror refracting the sounds of the past." The Line of Best Fit described Lopatin's aesthetic as retro-futurist. Tiny Mix Tapes stated that "the sounds on Rifts look to past versions of unrealized futures for inspiration," adding that "hearing the record in one sitting is like being in two times and places at once, like watching someone from another decade daydreaming."

PopMatters located a feeling of "dyschronia" in the music, noting an affinity with the contemporaneous "hypnagogic" music scene. The publication described the music as "strangely familiar and familiarly strange" and suggested that "much of Rifts indeed feels like communication technologies carrying on without the influence of anything but themselves and their own mechanical history, surrogate from human involvement." Rifts placed second in The Wire magazine's annual critics' poll of the records of the year. Following its 2012 reissue, Pitchfork called the album "an important touchstone" and stated that "the way Lopatin discovered fresh ideas inside of a worn-out genre is an inspiring story for the present age."

== Track listing ==
=== 2009 edition ===
All tracks are written by Daniel Lopatin.

Disc One
No.	Title	Original album	Length
1.	"Behind the Bank"	Betrayed in the Octagon	2:22
2.	"Eyeballs"	Betrayed in the Octagon	3:00
3.	"Betrayed in the Octagon"	Betrayed in the Octagon	3:33
4.	"Woe Is the Transgression I"	Betrayed in the Octagon	8:45
5.	"Parallel Minds"	Betrayed in the Octagon	3:22
6.	"Laser to Laser"	Betrayed in the Octagon	3:20
7.	"Woe Is the Transgression II"	Betrayed in the Octagon	10:56
8.	"Computer Vision"	Zones Without People	2:24
9.	"Format" (5:25) & "Journey North" (4:21)	Zones Without People	9:46
10.	"Zones Without People"	Zones Without People	4:02
11.	"Learning to Control Myself"	Zones Without People	5:36
12.	"Disconnecting Entirely"	Zones Without People	1:33
13.	"Emil Cioran"	Zones Without People	3:35
14.	"Hyperdawn"	Zones Without People	4:33

Disc Two
No.	Title	Original album	Length
1.	"Months"	Russian Mind	3:08
2.	"Physical Memory"	Russian Mind	10:53
3.	"Grief and Repetition"	Russian Mind	2:40
4.	"Russian Mind"	Russian Mind	5:03
5.	"Actual Air"	Ruined Lives EP	3:11
6.	"Immanence"	Russian Mind	7:18
7.	"Lovegirls Precinct"	split cassette with Outer Space	1:37
8.	"Ships Without Meaning"	Ruined Lives EP	9:39
9.	"Terminator Lake"	Transmat Memories EP	5:42
10.	"Transmat Memories"	Transmat Memories EP	5:35
11.	"A Pact Between Strangers"	A Pact Between Strangers	4:18
12.	"When I Get Back from New York"	A Pact Between Strangers	16:47
13.	"I Know It's Taking Pictures from Another Plane (Inside Your Sun)"	Young Beidnahga	2:30
Total length:			2:25:08

=== 2012 CD reissue ===
All tracks are written by Daniel Lopatin.

Disc One: Betrayed in the Octagon
No.	Title	Original album	Length
1.	"Woe Is the Transgression I"	Betrayed in the Octagon	8:45
2.	"Behind the Bank"	Betrayed in the Octagon	2:22
3.	"Eyeballs"	Betrayed in the Octagon	2:59
4.	"Betrayed in the Octagon"	Betrayed in the Octagon	3:32
5.	"Woe Is the Transgression II"	Betrayed in the Octagon	10:54
6.	"Parallel Minds"	Betrayed in the Octagon	3:21
7.	"Laser to Laser"	Betrayed in the Octagon	3:20
8.	"Ships Without Meaning"	Ruined Lives EP	9:37
9.	"Terminator Lake"	Transmat Memories EP	5:41
10.	"Transmat Memories"	Transmat Memories EP	5:33
11.	"A Pact Between Strangers"	A Pact Between Strangers	4:18
12.	"When I Get Back from New York (re-recorded)"	A Pact Between Strangers	16:46

Disc Two: Zones Without People
No.	Title	Original album	Length
1.	"Computer Vision"	Zones Without People	2:23
2.	"Format & Journey North"	Zones Without People	9:46
3.	"Zones Without People"	Zones Without People	4:00
4.	"Learning to Control Myself"	Zones Without People	5:36
5.	"Disconnecting Entirely"	Zones Without People	1:33
6.	"Emil Cioran"	Zones Without People	3:34
7.	"Hyperdawn"	Zones Without People	4:33
8.	"Lovergirls Precinct"	split cassette with Outer Space	1:36
9.	"I Know It's Taking Pictures from Another Plane (Inside Your Sun)"	Young Beidnahga	2:31
10.	"Blue Drive (re-recorded)"	KGB Nights / Blue Drive split cassette	9:56
11.	"The Trouble with Being Born"	Scenes with Curved Objects EP	4:31
12.	"Sand Partina"	split cassette with Caboladies	7:02

Disc Three: Russian Mind
No.	Title	Original album	Length
1.	"Months"	Russian Mind	3:05
2.	"Physical Memory"	Russian Mind	10:53
3.	"Grief and Repetition"	Russian Mind	2:39
4.	"Russian Mind"	Russian Mind	5:03
5.	"Time Decanted"	Russian Mind	3:10
6.	"Immanence"	Russian Mind	7:18
7.	"Melancholy Descriptions of Simple 3D Environments (re-recorded)"	Scenes with Curved Objects EP	10:53
8.	"Memory Vague"	split cassette with Caboladies	4:47
9.	"KGB Nights" (originally released under the artist name of KGB MAN)	KGB Nights / Blue Drive split cassette	6:08
Total length:			3:08:05

=== 2012 vinyl reissue ===
All tracks are written by Daniel Lopatin.

Disc One: Betrayed in the Octagon, Side A
No.	Title	Length
1.	"Woe Is the Transgression I"	8:45
2.	"Behind The Bank"	2:22
3.	"Eyeballs"	2:59
4.	"Betrayed in the Octagon"	3:32

Disc One: Betrayed in the Octagon, Side B
No.	Title	Length
1.	"Woe Is the Transgression II"	10:54
2.	"Parallel Minds"	3:21
3.	"Laser to Laser"	3:20

Disc Two: Zones Without People, Side A
No.	Title	Length
1.	"Computer Vision"	2:23
2.	"Format & Journey North"	9:46
3.	"Zones Without People"	4:00

Disc Two: Zones Without People, Side B
No.	Title	Length
1.	"Learning to Control Myself"	5:36
2.	"Disconnecting Entirely"	1:33
3.	"Emil Cioran"	3:34
4.	"Hyperdawn"	4:33

Disc Three: Russian Mind, Side A
No.	Title	Length
1.	"Months"	3:05
2.	"Physical Memory"	10:53
3.	"Grief and Repetition"	2:39

Disc Three: Russian Mind, Side B
No.	Title	Length
1.	"Russian Mind"	5:03
2.	"Time Decanted"	3:10
3.	"Immanence"	7:18

Disc Four: Drawn and Quartered, Side A
No.	Title	Original album	Length
1.	"Lovergirls Precinct"	split cassette with Outer Space	1:36
2.	"Ships Without Meaning"	Ruined Lives EP	9:37
3.	"Terminator Lake"	Transmat Memories EP	5:41
4.	"Transmat Memories"	Transmat Memories EP	5:33

Disc Four: Drawn and Quartered, Side B
No.	Title	Original album	Length
1.	"A Pact Between Strangers"	A Pact Between Strangers	4:18
2.	"When I Get Back From New York"	A Pact Between Strangers	16:46
3.	"I Know It's Taking Pictures From Another Plane (Inside Your Sun)"	Young Beidnahga	2:31

Disc Five: The Fall into Time, Side A
No.	Title	Original album	Length
1.	"Blue Drive"	KGB Nights / Blue Drive split cassette	9:56
2.	"The Trouble With Being Born"	Scenes with Curved Objects EP	4:31
3.	"Sand Partina"	split cassette with Caboladies	7:02

Disc Five: The Fall into Time, Side B
No.	Title	Original album	Length
1.	"Melancholy Descriptions Of Simple 3D Environments"	Scenes with Curved Objects EP	10:53
2.	"Memory Vague"	split cassette with Caboladies	4:47
3.	"KGB Nights" (originally released under the artist name of KGB MAN)	KGB Nights / Blue Drive split cassette	6:08
