= Contemporary Sapporo =

札幌コンテンポラリー

Studio album by 情報デスクVIRTUAL
- Released: April 20, 2012
- Genre: Vaporwave
- Length: 72:25
- Label: Beer on the Rug
- Producer: Ramona Andra Xavier

Vektroid chronology
| Floral Shoppe (2011) | 札幌コンテンポラリー (2012) | Color Ocean Road (2012) |

Alternate cover
- 2012 reissue cover

札幌コンテンポラリー (English: Contemporary Sapporo) is the tenth studio album by the American electronic musician Vektroid under the alias 情報デスクVIRTUAL (English: Virtual Information Desk), released on April 20, 2012 by the independent record label Beer on the Rug. Contemporary Sapporo is one of Vektroid's most popular albums. The album was uploaded to both Beer on the Rug and Vektroid's Bandcamp pages.

== Track listing ==
| No. | Title | Length |
|---|---|---|
| 1. | "WELCOME 2 SHOP@HOME NETW☯RK LLC" | 3:23 |
| 2. | "札幌地下鉄・・・「ENTERING FLIGHT MUSEUM」" | 2:37 |
| 3. | "ODYSSEUSこう岩寺「OUTDOOR MALL」" | 2:31 |
| 4. | "iMYSTIQUEエジプト航空 「EDU」" | 3:37 |
| 5. | "''GEAR UP'' 4 FLIGHTシアトルズベスト" | 3:50 |
| 6. | "7 WONDERS OF THE iNTERNET FT WIND☯WS 97「GEOMETRIC HEADDRESS」" | 1:49 |
| 7. | "heihu.org.cn MOON FOUNTAIN" | 2:12 |
| 8. | "PRISM CORP不可能な生き物" | 4:28 |
| 9. | "T E S T A R O S S A interLude ~ iNTELLiMAX RELEASE GROUP PRESENTS" | 2:09 |
| 10. | "NEO SUNSETTERS エネルギー危機iCONGO" | 0:58 |
| 11. | "TUSCANY背筋に対して「NEO SPA」" | 2:50 |
| 12. | "HB☯ PORN" | 4:07 |
| 13. | "CONTEMPORARYセーター (from New Dreams Ltd. demo)" | 1:26 |
| 14. | "HOTEL TAIWAN WELC☯MES U" | 2:31 |
| 15. | "M A X I FERRARI ~ レーススラム" | 3:04 |
| 16. | "風船ガムBUBBLEGUM" | 2:17 |
| 17. | "XX ''RUBY DUSK ON A 2ND LIFE NUDE BEACH'' ☯ . . . の生活・・・「ロベルタ」" | 3:33 |
| 18. | "「GOODNIGHT BLESS YOU」つかの間のSPIRIT" | 2:59 |
| 19. | "☆ANGELBIRTH☆" | 1:22 |
| 20. | "街へSAPPORO NiGHTS" | 2:41 |
| 21. | "WKPX CEEPHAX '81新しい年 「NITE OWL TV」" | 1:04 |
| 22. | "MARBLE白鳥" | 4:37 |
| 23. | "HEALING海岸で昼寝 「MY LAST TEARS」" | 1:25 |
| 24. | "DAYBREAK来世 「FLIGHT TO ISRAEL」" | 3:55 |
| 25. | "3D崖の端 / ''B E Y O N D'' THE LIMIT" | 3:34 |
| 26. | "三更" | 3:26 |
| Total length: | | 72:25 |

Beer On The Rug release
| No. | Title | Length |
|---|---|---|
| 26. | Untitled | 1:37 |
| 27. | "三更" | 3:26 |
| Total length: | | 77:28 |

Notes

- The track "三更" is labeled as untitled on the Beer On The Rug release.
