= Seapunk =

Internet subculture

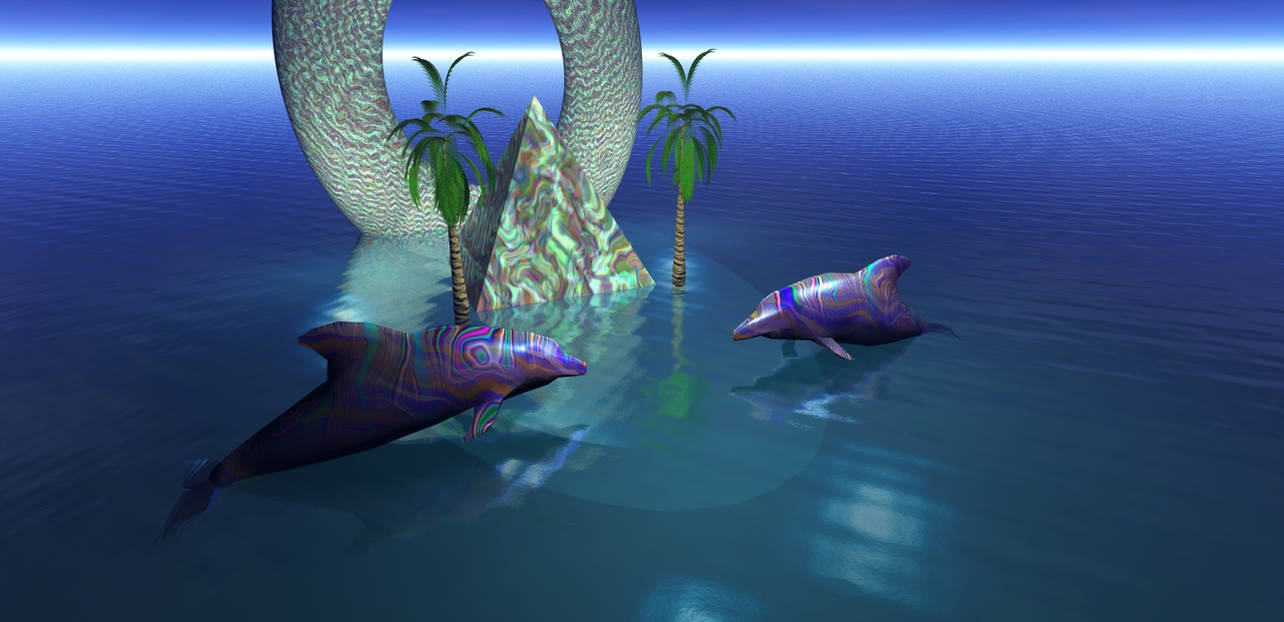
- Example of seapunk aesthetic
- Stylistic origins: 90s R&B; 90s pop; 90s house; Southern hip hop; chiptune; new-age; drum and bass; chopped and screwed; witch house
- Cultural origins: 2011, Tumblr cyberculture

Subgenres
- Icepunk

Local scenes
- Chicago, Illinois

Other topics
- Vaporwave; biopunk; slimepunk

Seapunk is a subculture and internet aesthetic that originated on Tumblr in 2011. It is associated with an aquatic-themed style of fashion, 3D net art, iconography, and allusions to popular culture of the 1990s. The advent of seapunk also spawned its own electronic music microgenre, featuring elements of Southern hip hop and pop music and R&B music of the 1990s. Seapunk gained limited popularity as it spread through the Internet, although it was said to have developed a Chicago club scene.

== History ==
=== Forerunners ===
Precursors to the seapunk aesthetic are evident in the post-apocalyptic Kevin Costner film Waterworld, the background graphics in the Sega Genesis game Ecco the Dolphin, the 2007 video game Aquaria, the surfer gangs in Point Break with their shell jewelry, and the iridescent green and blue dresses worn by the mute mermaid Marina in Stingray.

=== Origins ===
Originally, seapunk started as a trend and an Internet meme on Tumblr in 2011. The term "seapunk" was coined by DJ Lil Internet in 2011, in a humorous tweet: "Seapunk leather jacket with barnacles where the studs used to be." In December 2011, Cluster Mag reported on the emergence of seapunk in electronic media and quoted Pictureplane, who described seapunk as "a mostly Internet-based phenomenon birthed out of the Tumblr and Twitter universes as a means to describe a lifestyle aesthetic that is all things oceanic and of the sea." Musician Ultrademon is also credited with originating the short-lived movement. She released an album titled Seapunk in 2012.

Images featuring neon flashing colors and rotating geometric shapes floating above oceans of brilliant blue or green water are found on the pages tagged with a #Seapunk hashtag on Tumblr. Seapunk digital imagery draws largely from 1990s 3D net art. The aforementioned imagery has given rise to other internet-based subgenres consisting of similar themes, such as slimepunk and icepunk.

Rapper Azealia Banks used seapunk imagery in her "Atlantis" music video in 2012. Singer Rihanna was influenced by and referenced seapunk in her "Diamonds" performance on Saturday Night Live in 2012.

Elements of seapunk imagery were claimed to have influenced designers such as Versace and Givenchy.

== Musical style ==
Miles Raymer of the Chicago Reader described seapunk music as "a style of music that incorporates bits of '90s house, the past 15 years or so of pop and R&B and the latest in southern trap rap—all overlaid with a twinkly, narcotic energy that recalls new-age music and chopped and screwed hip hop mix tapes in roughly equal measure." According to The New York Times, seapunk music "constitutes a tiny music subgenre" that contains elements of witch house, chiptune, drum and bass, jungle music, 90s rave music and Southern rap. The New York Times also noted that some seapunk tracks remix songs from R&B acts such as Beyoncé and Aaliyah. In January 2012, an article about seapunk music was featured in the Dazed & Confused magazine. Katia Ganfield interviewed Lilium Kobayashi (a.k.a. Ultrademon) in the article, titled "Seapunk: A new club scene intent on riding sub-bass sound waves into the future".

Seapunk was said to have developed a Chicago club scene.

Notable seapunk artists include Azealia Banks, Blank Banshee, Grimes, Isaiah Toothtaker, Slava, and Unicorn Kid.

== Fashion ==
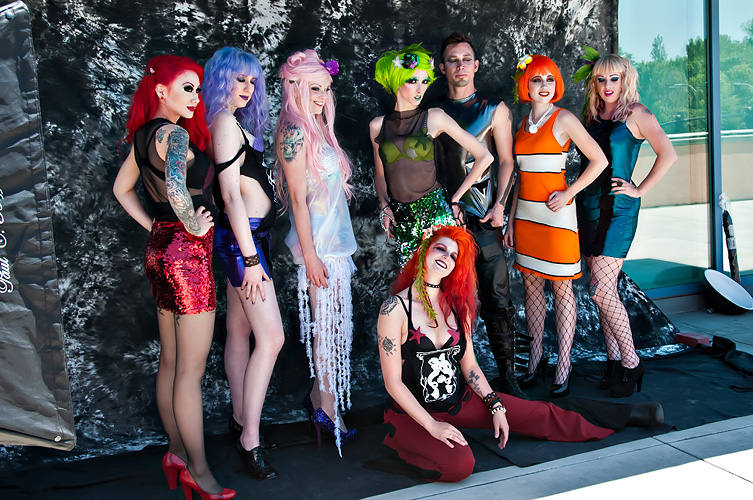
American women with rainbow hair and seapunk-inspired outfits, 2013

Seapunks often wear bright green, blue, turquoise, cyan, or aquamarine clothing; featuring nautical themes such as mermaids or dolphins, plastic Ray Ban wayfarers, shell jewelry, feathers, tartan overshirts associated with the surfer subculture, baseball caps, tie dye, transparent-plastic jackets, and skipper caps. Symbols such as yin-yangs, smiley faces, and references to the 1990s are also part of the style.

=== Hair and makeup ===
Seapunks often dye their hair, and sometimes facial hair, with varying shades of turquoise, lilac, and sea blue. The seapunk styling was appropriated by several mainstream popular music and hip hop artists during the 2010s, most notably Kreayshawn, Nicki Minaj, Soulja Boy, Taylor Swift, Katy Perry, Lady Gaga, Azealia Banks, Rihanna, and Frank Ocean.

== Related genres ==
=== Slimepunk ===
Slimepunk is a music genre and Internet aesthetic described as "oozy, dystopian synth hip hop".

== See also ==
- 2010s in fashion
- Biopunk
- Cyberpunk
- Cyberpunk derivatives
- Electronic dance music
- Trendies
- Vaporwave
- Utopian and dystopian fiction
- 1990s in music
- Post-Internet
