= Hyperconsumerism =

Consumption of goods beyond ones necessities

Hyperconsumerism, hyper-consumerism, hyperconsumption or hyper-consumption is the consumption of goods beyond one's necessities and the associated significant pressure to consume those goods, exerted by social media and other outlets as those goods are perceived to shape one's identity. Frenchy Lunning defines it curtly as "a consumerism for the sake of consuming."

== Characteristics ==
In a hyper-consumption society, "each social experience is mediated by market mechanisms", as market exchanges have spread to institutions in which they played lesser (if any) role previously, such as universities.

=== Personal identity ===
Hyperconsumerism is fueled by brands, as people often form deep attachment to product brands, which affects people's identity, and which pressure people to buy and consume their goods.

=== Product lifecycle ===
Another of the characteristics of hyperconsumerism is the constant pursuit of novelty, encouraging consumers to buy new and discard the old, seen particularly in fashion, where the product lifecycle can be very short, measured sometimes in weeks only.

=== Consumer manipulation tactics ===
In consumer behavior, limited-time offers and flash sales are strategically employed to instill a sense of urgency, often leveraging the psychological phenomenon known as the fear of missing out (FOMO). This tactic prompts consumers to make rapid purchasing decisions, driven by the perception that opportunities are fleeting.

=== Conspicuous consumption ===
In hyperconsumerism, goods are often status symbols, as individuals buy them not so much to use them, as to display them to others, sending associated meanings (such as displaying wealth). However, according to other theorists, the need to consume in hyper-consumption society is driven less by competition with others than by their own hedonistic pleasure.

=== Religious characteristics ===
Hyperconsumerism has been also said to have religious characteristics, and have been compared to a new religion which enshrines consumerism above all, with elements of religious life being replaced by consumerist life: (going to) churches replaced by (going to) shopping malls, saints replaced by celebrities, penance replaced by shopping sprees, desire for better life after death replaced by desire for better life in the present, and so on. Mark Sayers notes that hyperconsumerism has commercialized many religious symbols, giving an example of religious symbols worn as jewelry by non-believers.

== Criticism ==
Hyperconsumerism has been associated with cultural homogenization, globalization, Eurocentrism, Eurocentric modernizations, and consequently, the spread of Western culture. It has been blamed for environmental problems owing to excessive use of limited resources. It is seen as a symptom of overdevelopment. The vaporwave music genre is known for indirectly offering a critique by mocking the methods used to sell products to consumers through establishing a certain mood or setting – drifting through the virtual plaza, numb and caught in a consumption loop – and is consistently critical of that mood or setting.

== See also ==
- Neoliberalism – Political ideology promoting free-market capitalism
- Consumerism – Acquisition of goods beyond essential needs
- Peer pressure – Influencing peers to conform
- Novelty seeking – Personality trait
- Hypermodernity – Stage of society in postmodernism
- Hyperreality – Term for cultural process of shifting ideas of reality
- Commodification – Transformation of goods, services, ideas and people into commodities or objects of trade
- Throw-Away Society – Human society strongly influenced by consumerism
- Tech–industrial complex – 2025 final official speech of US President
- Consumer capitalism – Condition in which consumer demand is manipulated through mass-marketing
- Economic materialism – Excessive desire to acquire and consume material goods
- Conspicuous consumption – Concept in sociology and economy
- Consumption (economics) – Using money to obtain an item for use
- Keeping up with the Joneses – Idiom on comparing oneself to neighbors
- Overproduction – Excess of supply over demand of products being offered to an economic market
- Overexploitation – Depleting a renewable resource
