= Ramona Andra Langley =

American electronic musician (born 1992)

- Also known as: Vektroid: New Dreams Ltd.; PrismCorp Virtual Enterprises; Macintosh Plus; Peace Forever Eternal; DRVG CTRL; Dstnt; Laserdisc Visions; Fuji Grid TV; 情報デスクVIRTUAL; Tanning Salon; CTO; Vktrfry; Vectorfray; Sacred Tapestry; ESC 不在
- Born: August 19, 1992 (age 34)
- Origin: Portland, Oregon, U.S.
- Genres: Electronic; vaporwave; chillwave; experimental
- Occupation: Music producer
- Years active: 2005–present
- Labels: Beer on the Rug; PrismCorp; Pavillion36; Section 27

Ramona Andra Langley is an American electronic musician. She has released music under her primary Vektroid alias, as well as others, such as dstnt, Laserdisc Visions, New Dreams Ltd., Virtual Information Desk, and PrismCorp Virtual Enterprises. Langley played a prominent role in the popularization of the vaporwave subgenre with the release of her ninth studio album, Floral Shoppe, under the alias Macintosh Plus. Since then, she has continued to release music through Bandcamp and other online platforms.

== Career ==
Langley began producing and releasing electronic music in 2005. She has released music through aliases, including Macintosh Plus, PrismCorp, and Laserdisc Visions, among others. She reports that she has put out over forty releases since 2005. Paolo Scarpa characterized Langley's music as an "exposé of late capitalism". James Parker noted Vektroid's "sensuous virtuality" and "new cyber-pop unconscious". Writing for Sputnikmusic, Adam Downer called Floral Shoppe a shift toward beauty in an age that has nearly "run the gamut of what artists and musicians can do".

Tiny Mix Tapes ranked Floral Shoppe and 札幌コンテンポラリー, released by Langley under her Macintosh Plus and 情報デスクVIRTUAL aliases, respectively, on its list of its 50 favorite albums of 2012. Fact magazine called Floral Shoppe the defining album of Bandcamp, the streaming service through which Vektroid releases her music. The album is the site's most user-recommended album in the experimental music category.

Langley stopped releasing music regularly in early 2013, only releasing two albums that year: Home™ and ClearSkies™. Both albums were released simultaneously in April, under the pseudonym PrismCorp Virtual Enterprises. In 2014, Langley released Initiation Tape: Isle of Avalon Edition, a revision of her release Initiation Tape – Part One, as New Dreams Ltd. In early 2015, she collaborated with electronic duo Magic Fades to produce a remix of the song "Ecco" from their debut album, Push Through. In February 2016 she released three albums, Fuji Grid TV EX, Shader Complete and Sleepline. The first two are revisions of some of her albums, while the last one was produced in 2013 but never released previously.

== Impact and legacy ==
Under various aliases, Langley played a role in the creation of the modern electronic genre vaporwave between 2010 and 2013. Her projects, Macintosh Plus and New Dreams Ltd., are considered as the primary artists in the vaporwave genre.

== Personal life ==
Langley resided in Portland, Oregon until she moved to Washington state in April 2024. She came out as a trans woman in June 2011. She was diagnosed with autism in February 2024.

== Discography ==
Year	Name	Album title	Notes
2009	Vektordrum	Capitose Windowpane	
2009	Vektordrum	Deciphered	
2009	Vektordrum	Fraktalseq: Blossom	
2009	Vektordrum	I, Banished	
2009	Vektordrum	Hello1&2	Compilation of the EP's "Hello Skypedals EP1" and "Hello Skypedals EP2"
2010	Vektordrum	Geese	
2010	dstnt	isÆ	
2010	dstnt	Night Signals II	
2010	dstnt	iss2+2	
2010	Vektroid	Telnet Erotika	Reissued in 2017 as Telnet Complete
2011	Vektroid	Polytravellers	
2011	Vektroid	Starcalc	
2011	Vektroid	Neo Cali	
2011	Fuji Grid TV	Prism Genesis	Reissued in 2016 as Fuji Grid TV EX under the name New Dreams Ltd.
2011	Laserdisc Visions	New Dreams Ltd.	
2011	New Dreams Ltd.	Initiation Tape – Part One	Reissued in 2014 as Initiation Tape: Isle of Avalon Edition
2011	esc不在	Black Horse	
2011	esc不在	MIDI Dungeon	
2011	Tanning Salon	Dream Castle	
2011	Macintosh Plus	Floral Shoppe	
2012	情報デスクVIRTUAL	札幌コンテンポラリー	
2012	Sacred Tapestry	Shader	Reissued in 2016 as Shader Complete
2012	Vektroid	Color Ocean Road	
2013	PrismCorp Virtual Enterprises	Home™	
2013	PrismCorp Virtual Enterprises	ClearSkies™	
2016	CTO	GDGA1	In collaboration with Ray Sherman
2016	New Dreams Ltd.	Sleepline	
2016	New Dreams Ltd.	Eden	
2016	PALACIO DEL RIO	NO TITLE	In collaboration with Siddiq
2016	Vektroid	Midnight Run	In collaboration with Siddiq
2016	Vektroid	Vektroid Texture Maps	
2016	Vektroid	Big Danger	
2016	Vektroid	RE•SET	
2017	Vektroid	Seed & Synthetic Earth	
2017	Peace Forever Eternal	Nextcentury	
2022	Vektroid & New Dreams Ltd.	Fuji Grid TV II: EMX	
2023	Vektroid	cRASH 1	
2024	Vektroid	cRASH 2: Mac +/-	
2024	Vektroid	777 PIG DANGER	
TBA	Macintosh Plus	Untitled album	
TBA	Vektroid	No Earth	
TBA	Vektroid	The Children's New Book	
