= Laura Glitsos =

Australian writer, musician and educator

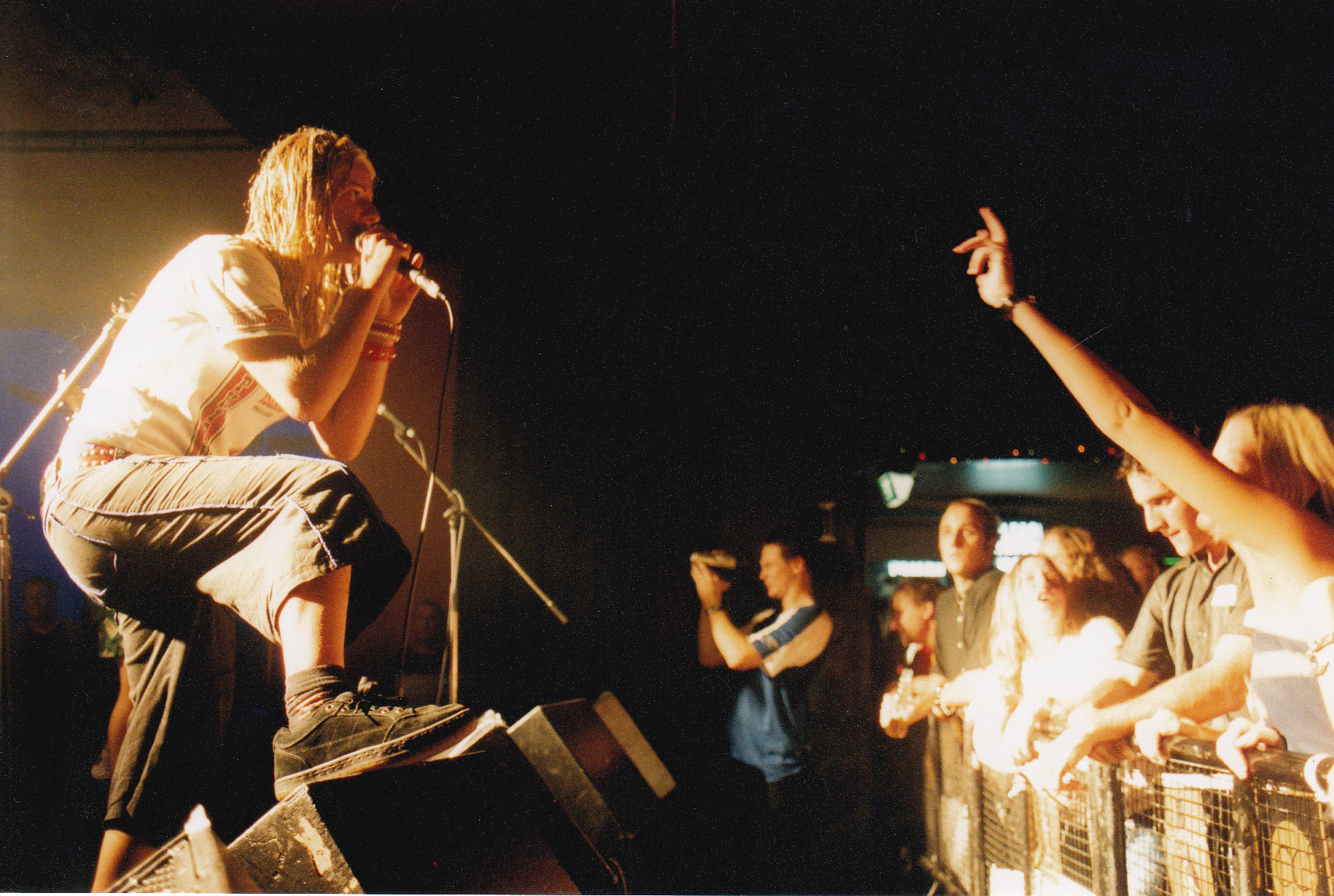
Laura Glitsos performing in Purrvert during the early 2000s on the Perth scene

Laura Glitsos (also known as Laura G) is a writer, academic and musician based in Perth, Western Australia. Glitsos continues as a performer and also works as an academic and lecturer at Curtin University and Edith Cowan University.

== Musical career ==
Glitsos formed Purrvert with drummer Nicholas Jonsson (End of Fashion, The Panda Band, Eskimo Joe), Roderick Tompkins (The Deaf Jefferies), and Troy "Spud" Anthony, in late 1999.

Purrvert gigged the Perth local circuit from 2000 to 2004, until Glitsos moved to Paris to work on the first English speaking radio station in the city, Paris Live Radio. Purrvert released two EPs entitled Tale Spinners and Weapons of Mass Production. Purrvert toured regionally, in Bunbury and Margaret River, and nationally, playing at St. Kilda's Espy Hotel with Dylan Lewis' alternative funk band Brown Hornet. Purrvert is remembered for playing in Perth with a diverse range of bands, such as The Panda Band, Rollerskates, Karnivool, and Spiderbait. In a 2002 X-Press Magazine review article, Brett Ladhams wrote,

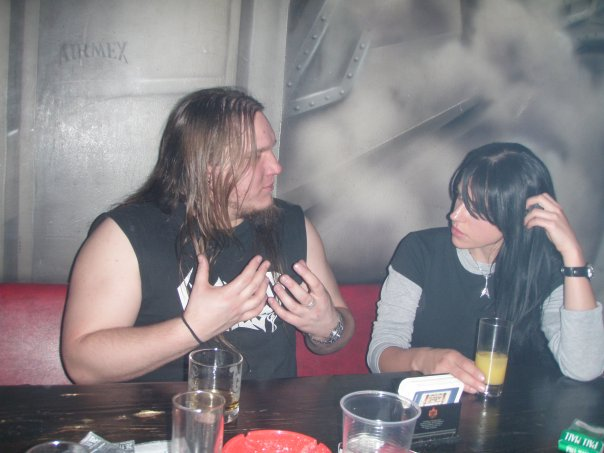
Laura Glitsos with Chris Keksgrinder, while Agent Red were situated in Berlin

The stunning Laura G anchors Purrvert to the hearts of men and the minds of girls with her strong, confident stage presence and inimitable hip hop style. While the band may be sick of hearing it, Purrvert sound unmistakably like the late, great Rage Against The Machine, which is a good thing. A little overbearing at time, Laura's vocals combine with the often-brilliant Purrvert band to create a stage show all its own in Perth.

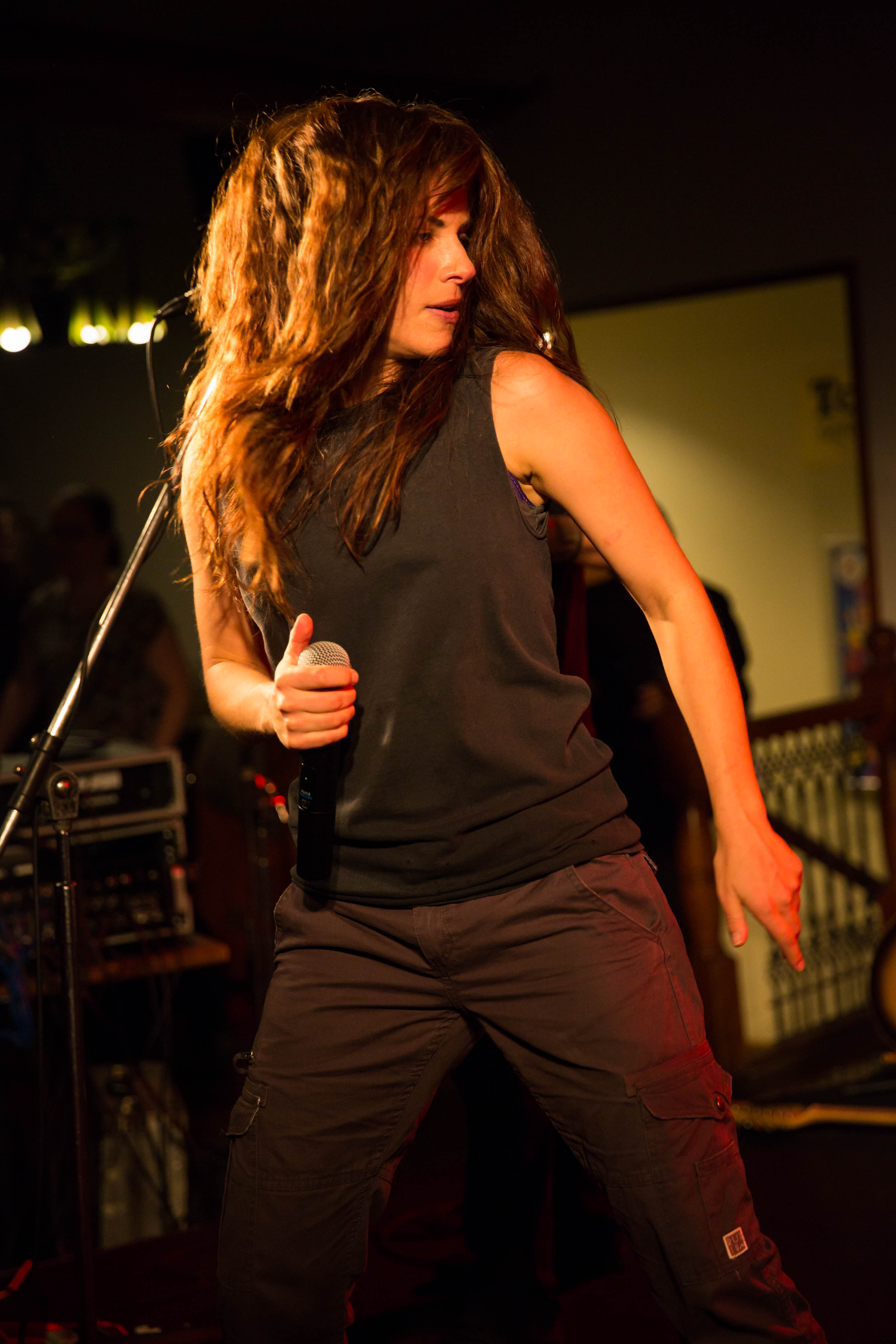
Laura Glitsos performing in Rubble of Empire, RATM Tribute Act

Glitsos was featured on the cover of Perth's Inside Magazine in 2002, with a range of other notable female musicians including Katy Steele and Rachel Claudio. In 2004, Glitsos was also featured in The West Magazine, which covered her move to Paris to work in radio.

On her return, Glitsos returned to academia and received her Honours in Communications and Cultural Studies at Curtin University, through which avenue she then went on to pursue a doctorate. However, Glitsos briefly returned to original music in 2009 with a new project titled Agent, Red formed with guitarist Rob Lawrence and drummer Ian Tyler (Tuxedo Pig). The band moved to Berlin for several months to write and rehearse but ultimately disbanded on return to Australia.

After several years, in 2015, Glitsos returned to the stage with a Rage Against The Machine tribute band for the purpose of protesting the Abbott Government's tertiary education policies and platform on asylum seekers. The tribute act, titled Rubble of Empire, continues to play shows around Perth and regional Western Australia. In an article on Toward Music, Glitsos is interviewed about the motivations for such a project, in which she says,

All the members of Rubble of Empire were impassioned by the political ideals and influenced by the grooving, heavy style that Rage Against the Machine established. Most importantly, RATM continued a tradition of music to reach out into the very concrete world and cultivate change en masse.

Glitsos formed Rubble of Empire with three other notable Perth musicians Karl Hiller (The Witches, Wormhole), Scott Howard (Ruby Boots, The Witches), and Giles Lowe (Stu Orchard Band).

=== West Australian Music Industry Awards ===
The Western Australian Music Industry Awards (commonly known as WAMis) are annual awards presented to the local contemporary music industry, put on by the Western Australian Music Industry Association Inc (WAM). Glitsos won two awards

Year	Nominee / work	Award	Result (wins only)
2001	Laura Glitsos	Most Popular Female Original Vocalist	Won
2002	Laura Glitsos	Most Popular Female Original Vocalist	Won

== Writing and journalism career ==
Glitsos has written feature articles in the fields of music and science/medicine, and had content featured in a diverse range of publications including Xpress Magazine, The West Australian, Astronomy WA, ScienceNetwork WA, The Water Corp, Consult Magazine, Murdoch University's ECOS Magazine, Australasian Science, and SymbioticA Lab at UWA. Glitsos was the editor of Astronomy WA, a Perth-based astronomy science website run by the Department of Science and Innovation for several years.

In her role as a freelance music journalist for Xpress Magazine, Glitsos has interviewed a broad range of artists including Wayne-Static (Static-X), Kerry King (Slayer), Abe Cunningham (Deftones), and many others.

== Academic career ==
Glitsos completed a doctoral research degree at Curtin University, where she lectured in popular music studies, communication studies, and Internet studies. Glitsos is currently a lecturer at Edith Cowan University. Alongside Cain Cressall, she was invited to speak at Seattle EMP Museum for the annual EMP PopCon 2016, which featured other vocalists such as k.d lang and Valerie June. Glitsos co-presented a seminar with extreme metal vocalist Cain Cressall (The Amenta, Malignant Monster) on the "limits of vocality". In 2013, Glitsos also presented a refereed paper at the International Association for the Study of Popular Music (Aus-NZ Branch) entitled "The ecology of 'sacred space': Indie music's exploration and construction of sacred space in the context of contemporary digital music". Since this time, she has published a stream of peer-review research on musicianship and cultural studies.

== Academic publications ==
=== Books ===
Glitsos, Laura. 2019. Somatechnics and Popular Music in Digital Contexts. New York: Palgrave MacMillan.

=== Peer Review Research Articles and Conference Proceedings ===
- 2021. “Covid-19 and the Perfectly Governed City.” Journal for Cultural Research. Forthcoming.
- 2021. “World-ready: A Journalism Capstone Unit Model with International Focus in a Pandemic and Post-pandemic Landscape.” Asia Pacific Media Educator. 31(1): 1–15. doi: 10.1177/1326365X211003743
- (with James Hall) "The Pepe the Frog meme: an examination of social, political, and cultural implications through the tradition of the Darwinian Absurd" in Journal for Cultural Research
- "Ebbs and flows: Women as musicians in Perth popular music, 1980s–1990s" in Perfect Beat: the Pacific journal of research into contemporary music and popular culture
- "From Rivers to Confetti: Reconfigurations of Time through New Media Narratives" in M/C Journal
- "'An Examination of Female Musicians in the Context of Perth’s Metal Community" in the journal of Popular Music and Society.
- "The Camera Phone in the Concert Space: Live Music and Moving Images on the Screen"
- "Nice girls don't jive: the rise and fade of women in Perth music from the late 1950s to the early 1970s" in the journal of Continuum
- "Screen as Skin: The Somatechnics of Touchscreen Music Media" in the journal of Somatechnics
- "Vaporwave, or music optimised for abandoned malls" in the journal of Popular Music
- "The ecology of 'sacred space': Indie music's exploration and construction of sacred space in the context of contemporary digital music" in Communities, Places, Ecologies: Proceedings of the 2013 IASPM-ANZ Conference

=== Chapters in Edited Collections ===
- "Sia, This Is Acting" in An Anthology of Australian Albums: Critical Engagements, edited by Dale, Stratton, and Mitchell
- "Frontierswomen and the Perth Scene: Female Metal Musicians on the 'Western Front' and the Construction of the Gothic Sublime." In Australian Metal Music: Identities, Scenes, and Cultures, Hoad, C., 91–107. Bingley: Emerald.

== External Sources ==
- Rubble of Empire, Live Music Video
