= Blank Banshee =

Canadian musician (born 1986)

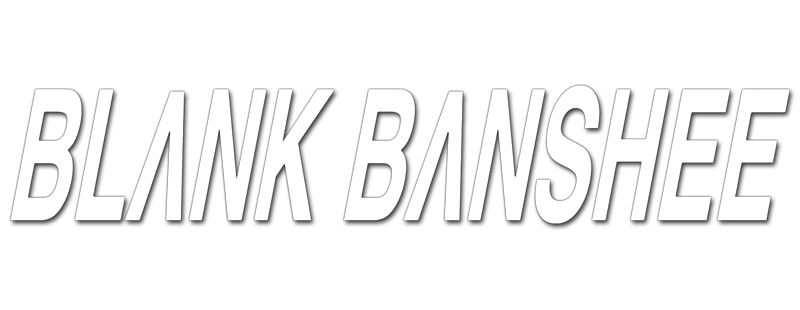
- The logo used at the top of Blank Banshee's album covers

Background information
- Born: Patrick Driscoll; June 28, 1986 (age 39); Saint John, New Brunswick, Canada
- Genres: Electronic; vaporwave; vaportrap; IDM
- Years active: 2009–present
- Label: Hologram Bay
- Website: blankbanshee.com

Patrick Driscoll (born June 28, 1986), known professionally as Blank Banshee, is a Canadian artist, musician and producer from Saint John, New Brunswick. He rose to popularity in 2012 with his album Blank Banshee 0, which combined traditional elements of vaporwave with trap music, a style now known as vaportrap. Blank Banshee's music has been described as a "balance of abstract ambience and dance-able trap".

== Career ==
=== 2010–2012: early years and Blank Banshee 0 ===
In 2010, Patrick Driscoll and vocalist Curtis "Cormorant" Ferguson (who had both previously been members of the band Shinjuku Mad) began performing live as "Blank Banshees". In April 2011, Blank Banshees were featured performers on the Electro East Stage of the annual Canadian East Coast Music Awards. By 2012 the duo had become a solo act, with Driscoll continuing to release instrumental music under the pseudonym "Blank Banshee" and Ferguson appearing as a recurrent guest vocalist.

In the summer of 2012, Driscoll left his Maritimes hometown, relocating to Vancouver, British Columbia, Canada, where he released his debut solo album Blank Banshee 0 shortly thereafter. The production style of Blank Banshee 0 dubbed "vaportrap" helped bring vaporwave to prominence in the 2010s.

"Teen Pregnancy", a track from Blank Banshee 0 was received with acclaim, featuring in a 2016 viral video named "S U N D A Y S C H O O L" posted by YouTube by editor Lucien Hughes, popularizing a phenomenon known as Simpsonwave and again in a 2020 TikTok trend.

=== 2013–2017: Blank Banshee 1 and Mega ===
Following the release of Blank Banshee 0, Driscoll began work on his second album, Blank Banshee 1, released October 20, 2013.

The Fader called Blank Banshee 1 "a masterwork of the new digital psychedelia" and a "definitive document of the vaporwave era".

A 2016 Esquire article cited Blank Banshee's musical style on Blank Banshee 1 as an example of the "direction that vaporwave has moved in, where the trap beat is emphasized and the political edge blunted".

Six animated music videos (collectively known as 'Paradise Disc') were released in support of the album via the official Blank Banshee YouTube channel.

In 2014, Driscoll began work on his third studio album, Mega, in Vancouver where he is based as of 2016. The album was released October 20, 2016. COMPLEX named Mega the "best release from the [Blank Banshee] project yet".

In 2017 he embarked on "The MEGA Tour" a 34 date tour spanning Europe and North America.

=== 2019–2021: Metamorphosis and Gaia ===
After announcing new music in January 2019, Driscoll returned to Europe in May for "The Metamorphosis Tour", which was followed by the release of an 18-minute "extended single" called Metamorphosis on June 20, 2019. Metamorphosis was released on all major streaming platforms and received a limited run on cassette tape.

In addition to its original format, a download-only version featuring 15 individual tracks called Metamorphosis: Extracted was released. The same 15 tracks were also released as a collection of MIDI files called 'MIDImorphosis'.

On January 1, 2020, the upcoming release of a 4th studio album was confirmed by Driscoll via Twitter.

On October 20, he tweeted a short promotional video subsequently confirming Gaia's November 30 release date. The album was released on vinyl, cassette and all major streaming platforms on November 30, 2020, along with a dedicated web page containing additional promotional media.

Gaia was supported by Chaos Disc, a series of six animated music videos released throughout 2021.

=== 2022–present: Music for Menus and 4D ===
A new Blank Banshee project entitled Music for Menus was released February 22, 2022.

On July 1, 2023, the blankbanshee.com website was updated sending visitors to a page containing a snippet of the track Time Thief, and displayed an automated toll-free phone number that played additional snippets when dialed. On August 1, 2023, Driscoll announced the release of the album 4D on August 20, 2023, along with an accompanying 4D Tour beginning in early October of that year.

== Discography ==
Albums

- Blank Banshee 0 (2012)
- Blank Banshee 1 (2013)
- Mega (2016)
- Gaia (2020)
- 4D (2023)

EPs

- Metamorphosis (2019)
- Music for Menus (2022)

Non-album tracks ("MISSINGNOs")

- Cormorant (2011)
- Equinox (2011)
- Zenesis (2012)
- Chlorophyl (2012)
- Marble Bust (2015)
- Memorization (2020)
- Lunar (2022)
- Snake Oil (2022)
- Will O the Wisp (2022)
- Air Ball (2022)
- Lime Tree (2022)
