= Betrayed in the Octagon =

Studio album by Oneohtrix Point Never
- Released: November 20, 2007
- Recorded: 2004–2007
- Genres: Electronic; new age
- Length: 39:16
- Label: Deception Island

Oneohtrix Point Never chronology
Betrayed in the Octagon (2007)	Memory Vague (2009)

Professional ratings
Review scores
Source	Rating
AllMusic	4/5 stars

Betrayed in the Octagon is the debut studio album by electronic artist Oneohtrix Point Never, initially credited to "Magic Oneohtrix Point Never".

== Background ==
The album is the first Lopatin released under the "Oneohtrix Point Never" pseudonym. The album was released initially in 2007 on hand-numbered cassettes on the Deception Island label. It was reissued on vinyl in 2009 under No Fun Records.

The album was recorded in Massachusetts with a Roland Juno-60, a Sequential Circuits Six-Trak, and a Roland MSQ-700 Sequencer.

Songs from the album were later re-released on the 2009 compilation Rifts.

== Reception ==
Writing for AllMusic, Fred Thomas wrote that Lopatin "[cascades] through phrases of haunted elegance and more mellow new age reflection" on the album that started the Oneohtrix Point Never project.

== Track listing ==
Adapted from cassette liner notes. Later releases do not include the first track "Weird Times Docking This Orb", and track 7 "Parallel Mind Overture" is renamed to "Parallel Minds", including the digital version on Bandcamp. These changes were first seen in the second release of this album in 2009 as an LP.

No.	Title	Length
1.	"Weird Times Docking This Orb"	5:08
2.	"Woe Is the Transgression I"	7:39
3.	"Behind the Bank"	2:22
4.	"Eyeballs"	2:59
5.	"Betrayed in the Octagon"	3:32
6.	"Woe Is the Transgression II"	10:54
7.	"Parallel Mind Overture"	3:22
8.	"Laser to Laser"	3:20
Total length:		39:16

== Personnel ==
Adapted from LP liner notes:

- Daniel Lopatin – music, production
- Chris Madak – art, layout
