= Memory Vague =

Video by Oneohtrix Point Never
- Released: June 1, 2009
- Genres: Vaporwave, ambient
- Length: 33:21
- Label: Root Strata
- Producer: Daniel Lopatin

Oneohtrix Point Never chronology
Betrayed in the Octagon (2007)	Memory Vague (2009)	Zones Without People (2009)

Memory Vague is a 2009 audio-visual project by Oneohtrix Point Never, an alias of electronic musician Daniel Lopatin. It was released as a limited-edition DVD-R by Root Strata on June 1, 2009.

== Background ==
Memory Vague compiles found footage of commercials, animation, and music videos sourced from YouTube videos and edited by Lopatin in Windows Movie Maker. It collects several videos previously uploaded to YouTube via Lopatin's sunsetcorp channel, including the profile-raising videos "angel" and "nobody here". The DVD features several of Lopatin's "eccojams": audio-visual pieces which typically sample micro-excerpts of 1980s sources and "slow them down narcotically" with effects such as echo and pitch shifting added in a manner reminiscent of chopped and screwed styles. Due to the stylistic effects present in the project, Memory Vague is considered a pioneering work in the vaporwave genre.

== Track listing ==
No.	Title	Length
1.	"Zones Without People"
2.	"Angel"
3.	"Ships Without Meaning"
4.	"Memory Vague"
5.	"Nest 5900"
6.	"Chandelier's Dream"
7.	"Unmaking the World"
8.	"Heart of a Champion"
9.	"Radiation"
10.	"Computer Vision"
11.	"Nobody Here"

== Personnel ==
- Daniel Lopatin – music
- Maxwell August Croy – design, layout
