= Consumer capitalism =

Condition in which consumer demand is manipulated through mass-marketing

Consumer capitalism is a theoretical economic and social political condition in which consumer demand is manipulated in a deliberate and coordinated way on a very large scale through mass-marketing techniques, to the advantage of sellers.

This theory is controversial. It suggests manipulation of consumer demand so potent that it has a coercive effect, amounts to a departure from free-market capitalism, and has an adverse effect on society in general. According to one source, the power of such "manipulation" is not straightforward. It depends upon a new kind of individualism — projective individualism, where persons use consumer capitalism to project the kind of person who they want to be.

Some use the phrase as shorthand for the broader idea that the interests of other non-business entities (governments, religions, the military, educational institutions) are intertwined with corporate business interests, and that those entities also participate in the management of social expectations through mass media.

Harold Wilhite, a Professor of Social Anthropology and Research, emphasizes that understanding capitalism is crucial for grasping the roots of unsustainable consumption. In his 2016 book The Political Economy of Low Carbon Transformation, he places capitalism at the core of his analysis. Drawing from thinkers such as Karl Marx, David Harvey, and Thomas Piketty, Wilhite examines how the foundational elements of capitalism — economic growth, individual ownership, marketization, product differentiation, and turnover — hinder sustainability transformations and fuel increasing consumption. He delves further into the societal impacts of capitalism’s growth imperative, arguing that it not only shapes systems of provision but also fosters cultures and habits of perpetual consumption growth.

== Origins ==
The origins of consumer capitalism are found in the development of American department stores from the mid 19th Century, notably the advertising and marketing innovations at Wanamaker's in Philadelphia. Author William Leach describes a deliberate, coordinated effort among American "captains of industry" to detach consumer demand from "needs" (which can be satisfied) to "wants" (which may remain unsatisfied). This cultural shift represented by the department store is also explored in Émile Zola's 1883 novel Au Bonheur des Dames, which describes the workings and the appeal of a fictionalized version of Le Bon Marché.

In 1919 Edward Bernays began his career as the "father of public relations" and successfully applied the developing principles of psychology, sociology and motivational research to manipulate public opinion in favor of products like cigarettes, soap, and Calvin Coolidge. New techniques of mechanical reproduction developed in these decades improved the channels of mass-market communication and its manipulative power. This development was described as early as the 1920s by Walter Benjamin and related members of the Frankfurt School, who foresaw the commercial, societal and political implications.

In business history, the mid-1920s saw Alfred P. Sloan stimulating increased demand for General Motors products by instituting the annual model year change and planned obsolescence, a move that changed the dynamics of the largest industrial enterprise in the world, away from technological innovation and towards satisfying market expectations.

== Criticism ==
A criticism of consumer capitalism has been made by the French philosopher Bernard Stiegler. He argues that capitalism today is governed not by production but by consumption, and that the techniques used to create consumer behavior amount to the destruction of psychic and collective individuation. The diversion of libidinal energy toward the consumption of consumer products, Stiegler argues, results in an addictive cycle, leading to hyperconsumption, the exhaustion of desire, and the reign of symbolic misery.

== See also ==
- Capitalism
- Consumerism
- Conspicuous consumption
- Fear, uncertainty, and doubt
- Keeping up with the Joneses
