= 100% Electronica =

- Founded: 2015; 11 years ago
- Founder: George Clanton; Neggy Gemmy
- Genre: Vaporwave; chillwave; synth-pop; indie electronic; hypnagogic pop
- Country of origin: U.S.A.
- Location: Los Angeles, California
- Official website: https://www.100percentelectronica.com

100% Electronica is an American independent record label based in Los Angeles, California. Founded in 2015 in Brooklyn, New York, by electronic musicians and married couple George Clanton and Lindsey French (professionally known as Neggy Gemmy), the label specializes in vaporwave, chillwave, synth-pop, indie electronic, and hypnagogic pop.

== Origins ==
100% Electronica was established in New York in 2015 by musicians George Clanton and Neggy Gemmy. The founding coincided with the release of Clanton's studio album of the same name. Before completing the album, Clanton created holographic stickers reading "100% Electronica" to place on older mail-order records he was still sending out under his former monikers, Mirror Kisses.

Clanton drew the name from how mainstream American media in the 1990s loosely labeled electronic acts like The Prodigy as "electronica," creating a broad category that was virtually impossible to define. Adopting a tongue-in-cheek approach, Clanton used the phrase as a mission statement to expand the definition and cultural reach of vaporwave until its use became similarly ubiquitous.

The label initially focused on physical media production, specializing in vinyl records and cassette tapes. A major turning point for the label was partnering with the Australian electronic group S U R F I N G to press their album Deep Fantasy on vinyl. Because Clanton had long wanted to own the record physically, its successful launch proved to the founders that the label's business model would work.

== Philosophy ==
Although cassette tapes are commonly associated with the anachronistic aesthetic of the vaporwave movement, 100% Electronica observed that vinyl records outsold cassettes despite their higher price point. Clanton described vinyl as the preferred medium for collectors, citing the inclusion of 12x12 album artwork as a primary incentive. Additionally, the label gained recognition for producing custom color blends, splatter designs, and visual variations that significantly outperformed standard black vinyl in sales.

As an independent fixture of the DIY music community, 100% Electronica built its infrastructure around direct-to-fan platforms like Bandcamp and Shopify. Clanton welcomed the digital industry shift, noting that while mainstream critics repeatedly claimed vaporwave was dead, the label experienced record-breaking streaming numbers and physical sales. By its fifth year, the label began receiving mainstream industry interest, bypassing traditional major label timelines that lack patience for underground movements.

== 100% ElectroniCON ==
=== The first 100% ElectroniCON ===
On August 31, 2019, 100% Electronica produced the inaugural 100% ElectroniCON at Elsewhere in Bushwick, Brooklyn. Widely recognized as the world's first dedicated physical vaporwave festival, the sold-out, single-day event featured 22 performances across three stages. The lineup brought together internet-born electronic acts, including label founders George Clanton and Neggy Gemmy (then performing as Negative Gemini), alongside SAINT PEPSI, death's dynamic shroud, S U R F I N G, VAPERROR, 18 Carat Affair, telepath, Equip, and FM Skyline. The festival inspired similar genre-themed events by independent promoters worldwide.

=== 100% ElectroniCON 2 ===
Following the sold-out success of the inaugural event, 100% Electronica produced 100% ElectroniCON 2 on October 19, 2019, at Catch One in Los Angeles. The event marked the festival's West Coast debut and featured expanded multi-stage programming.

The lineup featured live performances by major label affiliates alongside prominent underground vaporwave, synth-pop, and internet-born electronic acts, including George Clanton, Slayyyter, Saint Pepsi, death's dynamic shroud, Equip, FM Skyline, VAPERROR, Yeule, Fire-Toolz, 18 Carat Affair, and telepath. 100% ElectroniCON 2 further solidified the label's model of translating online internet subcultures into large-scale, physical community gatherings. Clanton described the vaporwave community as resembling an active online multiplayer game, viewing the label's role as building the physical infrastructure and live events needed to support the scene.

=== ElectroniCON 3 ===
Following a three-year hiatus forced by live event cancellations during the COVID-19 pandemic, 100% Electronica hosted ElectroniCON 3 on August 20, 2022, marking a return to New York City at the Knockdown Center in Queens. The event represented a significant expansion in scale and programming, establishing the festival as a premier gathering for the vaporwave, chillwave, and underground electronic scenes.

The festival featured DJ sets from chillwave pioneers Washed Out and Neon Indian, alongside live performances by label founders George Clanton and Neggy Gemmy, death's dynamic shroud, Saint Pepsi, Small Black, Cowgirl Clue, S U R F I N G, Frost Children, Pictureplane, Equip, VAPERROR, FM Skyline, and desert sand feels warm at night. The event further demonstrated the label's capacity to bring internet-based music communities together into high-capacity physical venues.

=== The end of ElectroniCON ===
The fourth installment of the festival, officially titled ELECTRONICON 2023 (and colloquially referred to as ElectroniCON 4), took place across two days on August 25 and August 26, 2023, returning to the Knockdown Center in Queens, New York. The event represented the series' first multi-day installation and was heavily marketed by 100% Electronica using the explicit title and tagline "The End of ElectroniCON." The phrasing and visual aesthetic used across official promotional posters, event banners, and festival merchandise served as a direct stylistic homage to the iconic 1997 anime film The End of Evangelion, mirroring the film's title typography, apocalyptic motifs, and themes of thematic finality. The branding signaled a deliberate wrap-up of the festival series in its original high-capacity physical format, citing the mounting logistical, financial, and operational demands of running a large-scale independent festival.

==== Lineup controversy and changes ====
Prior to the event, the festival received public scrutiny following its initial lineup announcement. In response to online backlash regarding the booking of experimental musician John Maus, label co-founder George Clanton issued a public apology and removed Maus from the performance roster, reaffirming the festival's focus on maintaining a safe and welcoming space for its core audience.

==== Multi-day programming and aesthetics ====
Aesthetically, the two-day gathering expanded beyond the festival's foundational vaporwave roots to encompass hyperpop, experimental hip-hop, underground dance, and foundational plunderphonics.

Friday, August 25: Focused on future funk, synth-pop, and high-energy electronic performances, featuring headline sets by Night Tempo, Saint Pepsi, Neon Vectors, Pictureplane, Luxury Elite, and ESPRIT 空想.

Saturday, August 26: Featured an expansive electronic and alternative lineup, including performances by George Clanton, Doss, RXK Nephew, death's dynamic shroud (performing for the first time as a full live trio), James Ferraro, Neggy Gemmy, 18 Carat Affair, Equip, FM Skyline, Full Body 2, Architecture in Tokyo, Giant Claw, and a DJ set by Frost Children.

The 2023 festival ultimately cemented the label's legacy in establishing a physical, real-world infrastructure for internet-born electronic music communities.

== Artists ==
100% Electronica represents and distributes physical media for a roster of underground electronic, vaporwave, and synth-pop acts. Its current roster includes:

- Auragraph
- death's dynamic shroud
- Equip
- ESPRIT 空想
- FM Skyline
- G.E.N.E.
- George Clanton
- Mirror Kisses
- Neggy Gemmy
- Pictureplane
- Satin Sheets
- Small Black
- Software
- S U R F I N G
- Vitesse X
- Windows 96

== Selected discography ==
100% Electronica selected discography
Year	Artist	Title	Format(s)	Details
2015	George Clanton	100% Electronica	LP, cassette, CD, digital	Label debut release
2016	S U R F I N G	Deep Fantasy	LP, cassette, digital	Originally released on cassette in 2012, 100% Electronica signed a physical distribution agreement in 2016 to issue the album's first official vinyl pressing.
2016	ESPRIT 空想	virtua.zip	LP, cassette, CD, digital	Originally released in 2014; reissued in 2016 following the founding of 100% Electronica in 2015
2016	Negative Gemini	Body Work	LP, cassette, CD, digital	100% Electronica debut album; artist's second LP overall following her 2013 self-released debut, Forget Your Future.
2017	ESPRIT 空想	200% Electronica	LP, cassette, CD, digital	Second full-length album under the ESPRIT 空想 moniker; functions as a sister project to George Clanton's 2015 LP 100% Electronica, incorporating chopped and screwed samples of his own vocal work.
2018	Satin Sheets	St. Francis	LP, cassette, digital	Originally self-released in 2017 under the alias sprite1999; reissued in 2018 with 4 new tracks
2018	George Clanton	Slide	LP, cassette, CD, digital	Clanton's second studio album, described by the artist as a "vaporwave opera", marked the label's transition from traditional sample-loops toward original 1990s trip-hop and alt-pop instrumentation.
2019	Equip	Cursebreaker X	LP, cassette, CD, digital	Framed as a 16-bit role-playing game soundtrack, the album follows a weapon collector tracking a cursed, blood-red blade, featuring cover art designed by artist Keith Rankin.
2020	George Clanton & Nick Hexum	George Clanton & Nick Hexum	LP, cassette, CD, digital	
2021	Small Black	Cheap Dreams	LP, cassette, CD, digital	
2021	Windows 96	Magic Peaks	LP, cassette, digital	
2022	Vitesse X	Us Ephemeral	LP, cassette, digital	Debut studio album released through a single-album partnership with 100% Electronica in March 2022.
2022	death's dynamic shroud	Darklife	2xLP, cassette, CD, digital	
2023	Neggy Gemmy	CBD Reiki Moonbeam	LP, cassette, CD, digital	
2023	George Clanton	Ooh Rap I Ya	LP, cassette, CD, digital	
2025	Neggy Gemmy	She Comes from Nowhere	LP, cassette, CD, digital	
2026	death's dynamic shroud	Heavy Black Heart (Masterpiece Edition)	LP, cassette, CD, digital	Originally released by Orange Milk Records in 2017; reissued in 2026 with 22 minutes of unreleased material.
