= Vitesse X =

American DJ and electronic music producer

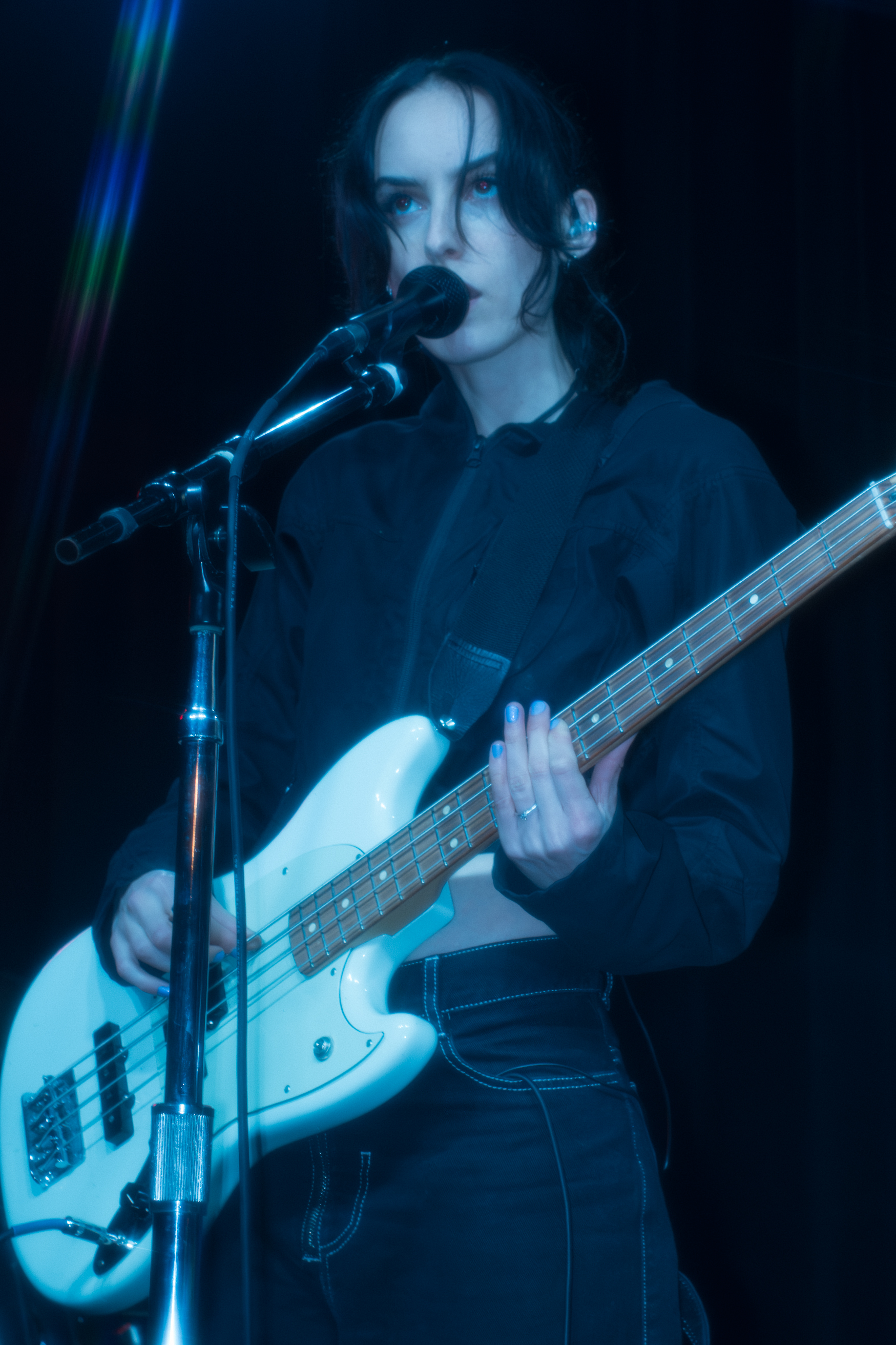
- Vitesse X in April 2025

Background information
- Born: Jordan Stern
- Origin: New Paltz, New York, U.S.
- Genres: Electronic; trance; 2-step; jungle; dream pop; shoegaze; synth-pop
- Occupations: producer; musician; sing-songwriter; audio engineer; DJ; entrepreneur
- Instruments: vocals; guitar; bass guitar; synthesizer
- Years active: 2010s–present
- Labels: Music Website; 100% Electronica
- Website: www.vitessex.com

Vitesse X (/viːˈtɛs ɛks/) is the musical project of Jordan Stern, an American music producer, singer, songwriter, DJ and co-founder of independent label, Music Website. She released her debut album Us Ephemeral in 2022 on the label 100% Electronica, which critics praised for its fusion of dream-pop vocals with breakbeat and trance-influenced production. In 2024, she released her second album, This Infinite, through her label Music Website. The record received positive critical attention from outlets including KEXP, Stereogum, Nina Protocol and Ones To Watch. It featured collaborations with Jack Tatum of Wild Nothing and Finnish duo Pearly Drops, and was noted for its shift toward indie-influenced production.

== Early Background ==
Jordan Stern grew up in New Paltz, New York, where she was initially active as a skier and runner before shifting her focus to music. She has cited long trips to competitions, listening to albums on headphones, as sparking a deeply personal connection to music, with Radiohead’s In Rainbows as a formative influence during her teenage years, she also recalled early moments of musical transcendence such as hearing Moby in a planetarium, which left a lasting impression on her sense of music's ability to evoke otherworldly states.

She attended college at James Madison University in Harrisonburg, Virginia and became involved in the local DIY music scene and began playing in punk and shoegaze bands. During this period she joined the shoegaze band Surfing and relocated to Brooklyn, releasing early material that gained blog attention, noted by Stereogum as "fine tuned dream pop."

In 2015, she joined former Beach Fossils bassist, John Peña’s project Heavenly Beat as a touring guitarist. Following this period, she began working as an audio engineer and establishing herself as a DJ in Manhattan’s club circuit, an experience she has described as shaping her later approach to electronic production.

In 2020, when the COVID-19 pandemic halted touring and nightlife, Stern began writing and producing her own music, eventually developing the material that became her debut album as Vitesse X.

== Career ==
In September 2021, Vitesse X released the single "Potential Energy" on the independent label 100% Electronica. Gorilla vs Bear described the track as a "euphoric, rave-ready" club anthem, comparing her sound to contemporaries like Doss and TDJ. Later that year, she supported George Clanton and Magdalena Bay on their U.S. tour, including a sold-out show at Music Hall of Williamsburg in Brooklyn.

On January 13, 2022, Stern announced her debut album Us Ephemeral and released the title track with an accompanying video directed by Jennifer Medina. Stern explained in a 2022 interview that “Us Ephemeral” was the first song she wrote at the start of the COVID-19 lockdown, describing it as a reflection on impermanence and gratitude and an ode to embracing the passing of time and savoring the moments that make us whole. The single was noted for its blend of dream-pop, drum and bass percussion, and vaporwave elements, with Ones to Watch describing it as “hypnotic yet energetic” and “cathartic and refreshing.” Flood Magazine highlighted the video’s nostalgic visuals filmed in Stern’s hometown of New Paltz, New York.

On March 25, 2022, Vitesse X released her debut full-length album Us Ephemeral on 100% Electronica. Pitchfork noted that the record blended trance, 2-step, and jungle influences with dream-pop vocals, describing it as "engineered with precision" and a highlight within the label’s roster. The review also observed that Stern, who had previously played in shoegaze bands, carried that background into her electronic work. The album’s title track, "Us Ephemeral," was included in Vice magazine’s list of the 50 best songs of 2022.

In 2023, Stern expanded her output with several standalone releases and collaborations that prefaced her second full-length project. During this period she also began operating her own label, Music Website, alongside music manager and photographer Chris Burden, as a vehicle for her own releases and affiliated artists–marking her transition toward increased artistic and label-level autonomy.

In January 2023, Stern released the instrumental single "In The Balance," as the first release on her newly formed label Music Website. On February 22, she released single and video "Right Now." In a feature with Flaunt Magazine, she explained that the accompanying video (co-directed with Chris Burden) shot in Montauk, NY, drew inspiration from a sunrise hike as a means to "reclaim the current moment amidst the constant go-go-go." Flaunt described "Right Now" as an "ever-flowing ethereal odyssey" encouraging listeners to savor each moment.

In October 2023, Stern contributed vocals and co-writing to the track "Into Dream" on Canadian trance producer TDJ's SPF INFINI 3 compilation. In April 2024, the track was later mixed by Shygirl and included on her DJ compilation album Fabric presents: Shygirl, released on Fabric Records.

In January 2024, Vitesse X released a cover of Pinback’s “Fortress,” from the band’s 2004 album Summer in Abaddon.

On October 4, 2024, Vitesse X released her second full-length album, This Infinite, through her Music Website label. The record was preceded by the singles "Realize," "way i luv," "Eternal," and "Careless," the latter featuring Jack Tatum of Wild Nothing. The album also includes a collaboration with Finnish duo Pearly Drops on the track "Get in Girls".

This Infinite marked a stylistic shift away from the rave-inspired production of her debut toward a more raw, indie-influenced sound. Ones To Watch noted that it drew on early 2000s indie, blending shoegaze and dream pop with electronic production. KEXP praised the record as an energetic and intuitive step forward.

In February 2025, Stern released an official remix of Canadian hyperpop artist Sophia Stel’s “Object Permanence,” the title track of Stel’s 2024 debut EP. In April 2025, Vitesse X toured on her album This Infinite in the United States alongside Death's Dynamic Shroud. On December 3, 2025, Stern released the single “Memori,” accompanied by a video directed with Chris Burden. The song was noted in press coverage for its thematic engagement with mortality and metaphysical reflection, informed by Stern’s interest in near-death experience narratives and the passing of filmmaker David Lynch.

In May 2026, Vitesse X released a cover of Filter’s 1999 single “Take a Picture” through her label Music Website. Coverage described her version as a dreamy, nostalgic reimagining of the late-1990s alternative rock hit, incorporating trip-hop-leaning drums, atmospheric production, and dream-pop textures.

== Musical Style and Influences ==
Stern’s work as Vitesse X blends elements of shoegaze, trance, ambient, and electronic pop. Critics have frequently compared her sound to shoegaze bands such as My Bloody Valentine and Slowdive, particularly in her use of reverb-heavy vocals, ambient textures, and dense, layered synths. In a review of her debut album Us Ephemeral, Pitchfork also drew comparisons to early-’90s work by Orbital, emphasizing her fusion of nostalgic rave sounds with contemporary pop production.

In various interviews, Stern has cited an early formative experience hearing Moby in a planetarium as “surely one of [her] first moments of sonic transcendence.” She also cited early exposure to punk and hardcore bands such as Fugazi, At the Drive-In, and Bad Brains, alongside early favorites including Massive Attack, Radiohead, and Four Tet. She described this eclectic listening as a foundation for viewing music as “a tool for catharsis” and credited these influences for helping her incorporate darker undertones into her sound.

On her Apple Music artist profile, she named Kraftwerk’s Tour de France and Aphex Twin’s Selected Ambient Works 85–92 among her all-time favorite albums, noting their influence on her rhythmic and atmospheric sensibilities. She also expressed admiration for Sade, saying the artist “reunited [her] with the power of the feminine.”

== Discography ==
=== Albums ===
- This Infinite (Music Website, 2024)
- Us Ephemeral (100% Electronica, 2022)

=== Singles ===
- "Memori" (2025)
- "Get in Girls" ft. Pearly Drops (2024)
- "Careless" (2024)
- "way i luv" (2024)
- "Realize" (2024)
- "Into Dream" with TDJ (2023)
- "Right Now" (2023)
- "In The Balance" (2023)
- "Us Ephemeral" (2022)
- "Potential Energy" (2021)

=== Covers ===
- "Take a Picture" (2026) - Filter Cover
- "Fortress" (2024) - Pinback Cover

=== Remixes ===
- Sophia Stel "Object Permanence" (Vitesse X Remix) (2025)
