= Liquorice (album) =

Studio album by Hatchie
- Released: 7 November 2025
- Recorded: 2024
- Genre: Dream pop; shoegaze
- Length: 36:40
- Label: Secretly Canadian
- Producer: Melina Duterte; Joe Agius

Hatchie chronology
Giving the World Away (2022)	Liquorice (2025)

Singles from Liquorice
- 1. "Lose It Again" Released: 3 September 2025; 2. "Only One Laughing" Released: 9 October 2025; 3. "Sage" Released: 7 November 2025

Liquorice is the third studio album by the Australian musician Hatchie. The album follows Giving the World Away (2022). It was produced by the American musician Melina Duterte, known by her stage name Jay Som, and Hatchie's partner, the Australian musician Joe Agius. Hatchie and Agius wrote songs and recorded demos from 2022 to 2024 in Brisbane and Melbourne. The album was recorded in September 2024 at Duterte's home studio in Los Angeles, featuring Hatchie, Agius, and Stella Mozgawa on drums. Critics have described the album as alt-pop, dream pop, and shoegaze. It was released on 7 November 2025 by Secretly Canadian and received positive reviews.

== Background and production ==
Following the release of her second album Giving the World Away in April 2022, Hatchie moved back to Los Angeles with her partner, the Australian musician Joe Agius. They decided to move back to Australia that summer after a week in which the United States Supreme Court overturned Roe v. Wade in Dobbs v. Jackson Women's Health Organization, there was a shooting on their street, and they contracted COVID-19. They moved in with Hatchie's parents in Brisbane, where Hatchie took a break from her music career.

Hatchie and Agius started writing Liquorice in Brisbane in 2022. While living at her parents' home in Brisbane, Hatchie had been free writing "bad songs and bad music" as a way to break down her high expectations for her songs and self-imposed restrictions in songwriting. She eventually discovered that her songs were focusing on the experiences of her early 20s, when she was an "unhinged lover girl" who overanalysed her social interactions and romanticised small gestures. At one point, Hatchie and Agius moved to Melbourne, where they continued to work on writing the album and recording demos through 2024. The album was produced by the American musician Melina Duterte, known by her stage name Jay Som, and Agius. It was recorded in September 2024 at Duterte's home studio in Los Angeles.

== Composition ==
Like Hatchie's previous albums, critics have described Liquorice as blending dream pop and shoegaze. Critics have compared the album's tracks to several artists in those genres, including the Cocteau Twins, the Sundays, and Mazzy Star. Hatchie titled the album after liquorice lollipops, a childhood treat, and liquorice tea, which she drinks to soothe her vocal cords.

== Promotion and release ==
Hatchie announced Liquorice and released its lead single "Lose It Again" on 3 September 2025. She released its second single "Only One Laughing" on 9 October 2025. The album was released on 7 November 2025 by Secretly Canadian along with a music video for the third single "Sage". Hatchie also announced that she would perform two shows in Los Angeles and Brooklyn in February 2026, but she told Rolling Stone Australia / New Zealand that she had not booked a tour in advance of the album's release.

== Critical reception ==
Professional ratings
Aggregate scores
Source	Rating
Metacritic	81/100
Review scores
Source	Rating
AllMusic	4/5 stars
Clash	8/10
DIY	3/5 stars
Dork	5/5
The Guardian	4/5 stars
The Line of Best Fit	8/10
NME	4/5 stars
The Skinny	4/5 stars
Under the Radar	8/10 stars

According to the review aggregator Metacritic, Liquorice received "universal acclaim" based on a weighted average score of 81 out of 100 from 10 critic scores. Critics generally praised the album's production and songwriting. Heather Phraes in AllMusic rated it 4 out of 5 stars. She said that its production combined Hatchie's "lighter-than-air vocals", "crunchy drum machines", and "massive guitars" to create "a sound that's as blurry as vintage dream pop or distant memories". She also wrote that Hatchie's songwriting "eloquently expresses young love's volatility". Zahra Hanif for Clash rated the album 8/10, calling its production "shimmering" and stating that it was "poignant" and "poetic". In God Is in the TV, Jonathan Wright also praised its production, writing that it was "an expert take on a beloved music genre". Andy Von Pip, rating the album 8 out of 10 stars for Under the Radar, wrote that it "radiates a wistful warmth and a nostalgic sense of longing". Dom Lepore in The Line of Best Fit rated the album 8/10 and said that Hatchie "found the balance between maximalism and spaciousness". He called Liquorice an "apt title", stating that its tracks "taste sweet, salty, and bitter all at once", similar to "new and lost love".

Writing for The Guardian, Michael Sun rated the album 4 out of 5 stars. He compared it to Hatchie's 2018 EP Sugar & Spice, calling it "more mature and less immediately palatable". He said that the album "attempts to dismantle the grand romance" underlying her previous works and that it "feels more restrained by design". Felicity Newton in Dork called the album "a return to her shoegazey roots – less 'synth-pop girly', more Cocteau Twins in a sunhat". In The Skinny, Zoë White rated the album 4 out of 5 stars and said that it was "looser and less hurried" compared to Giving the World Away. For NME, Joe Goggins rated the album 4 out of 5 stars and said that the album represented a retreat "from the ambition and sonic diversity" of Giving the World Away.

Bella Martin in DIY gave the album a mixed review, rating it 3 out of 5 stars. She praised the tracks "Wonder" and "Lose It Again", but she wrote that the album lacked the focus of Giving the World Away and that, on some tracks, Hatchie's vocals faded into the music.

== Track listing ==
No.	Title	Writer(s)	Length
1.	"Anemoia"	Harriette Pilbeam	2:15
2.	"Only One Laughing"	Pilbeam; Joe Agius	4:10
3.	"Liquorice"	Pilbeam; Agius	2:57
4.	"Carousel"	Pilbeam; Agius	4:05
5.	"Sage"	Pilbeam; Agius	4:04
6.	"Someone Else's News"	Pilbeam; Agius	3:46
7.	"Wonder"	Pilbeam; Agius	3:08
8.	"Lose It Again"	Pilbeam; Jeremy McLennan; Agius	3:31
9.	"Anchor"	Pilbeam; Agius	2:05
10.	"Part That Bleeds"	Pilbeam; Agius	3:25
11.	"Stuck"	Pilbeam; Agius	3:14
Total length:			36:40

== Personnel ==
Credits adapted from the album's liner notes.

- Harriette Pilbeam – performance, creative direction
- Joe Agius – performance, production, creative direction, cover photography, design
- Melina Duterte – production, additional guitars on "Stuck"
- Jeremy McLennan – additional guitars on "Lose It Again"
- Stella Mozgawa – drums
- Alex Farrar – mixing
- Greg Calbi – mastering
- Bianca Edwards – innersleeve photography
- Nick Scott – art production, additional design

== Charts ==
Chart performance for Liquorice
Chart (2025)	Peak position
Australian Albums (ARIA)	88
UK Album Downloads (OCC)	88
UK Independent Albums Breakers (OCC)	16
