= Hatchie =

Australian pop musician (born 1993)

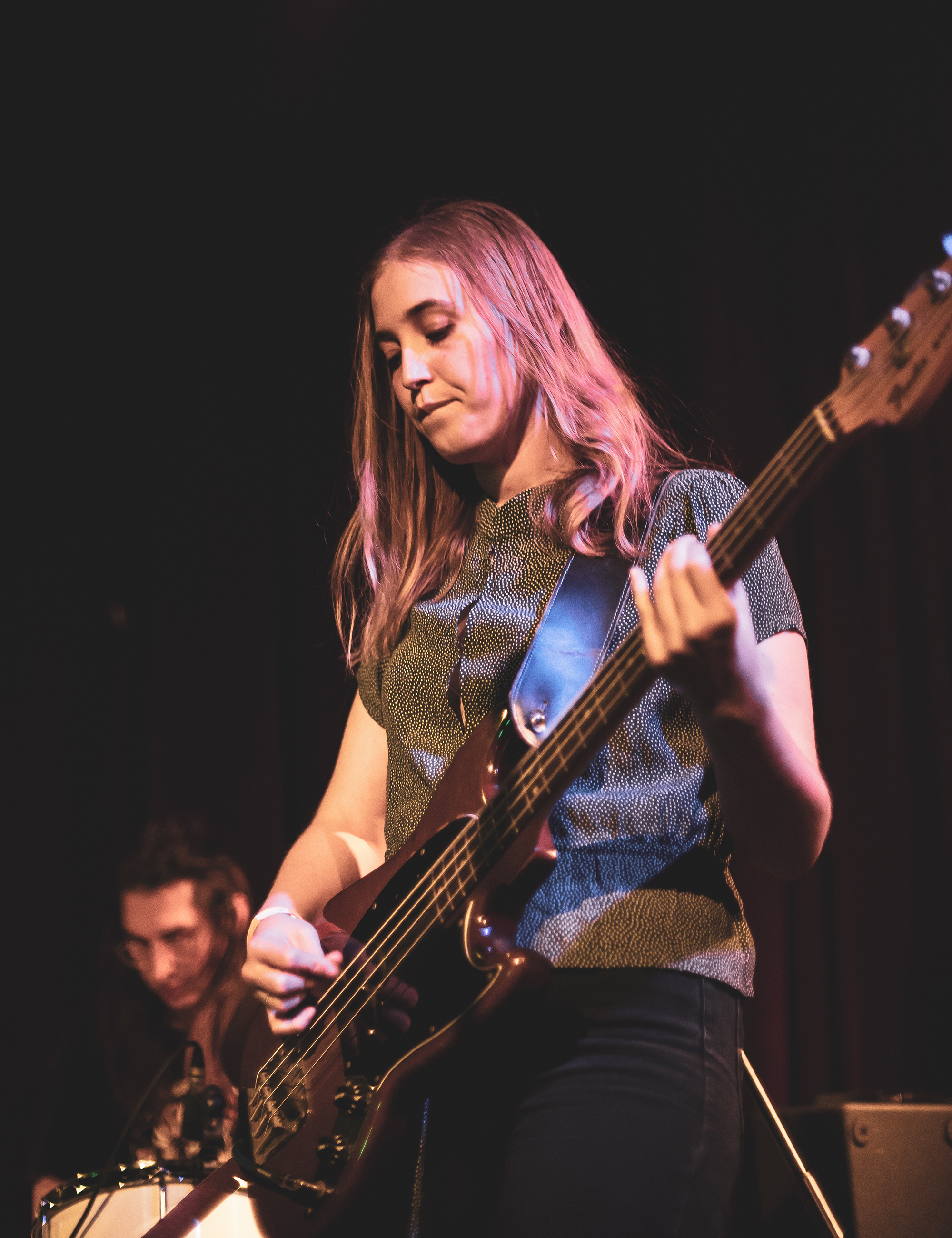
- Hatchie performing live in Los Angeles, 2018

Background information
- Born: Harriette Pilbeam; 4 May 1993 (age 33); Brisbane, Queensland, Australia
- Genre: Dream pop
- Occupations: Singer-songwriter; guitarist; musician
- Instruments: Vocals; bass; guitar; piano
- Years active: 2011–present
- Labels: Secretly Canadian; Double Double Whammy; Ivy League; Heavenly
- Formerly of: Go Violets, Babaganouj
- Spouse: Joe Agius (m. 2021)
- Website: hatchie.net

Harriette Pilbeam (born 4 May 1993), known professionally as Hatchie, is an Australian dream pop singer-songwriter and musician. She has released three studio albums—Keepsake (2019), Giving the World Away (2022), and Liquorice (2025)—and one extended play, Sugar & Spice (2018).

== Early life and career ==
Harriette Pilbeam was born on 4 May 1993 in Brisbane, Queensland. Her family was musically inclined and her parents encouraged learning instruments and singing harmonies. She started singing as a child, learned guitar and bass in her teen years, and then learned piano and clarinet. She studied at Queensland University of Technology, graduating with a Bachelor in Creative Industries, majoring in entertainment - including festivals and event management. She then pursued live music as a creative outlet.

Pilbeam began her career as a bassist in the band Go Violets, which released two EPs prior to disbanding in 2014. She was also a part of the band Babaganouj, alongside her fellow Go Violets bandmate Ruby McGregor and former Yves Klein Blue guitarist Charles Sale. The trio released several EPs and singles, as well as an album entitled Jumbo Pets, before splitting up in 2023.

Pilbeam made her solo debut under the name Hatchie, her family nickname, with the release of her debut single "Try" in May 2017, which she uploaded to Triple J. The single gained her radio airplay and a management contract with Jake Snell. She then signed with Ivy League Records and released her second single "Sure" in November 2017. In January 2018, she also signed with Double Double Whammy and Heavenly Recordings. In February, "Sure" was remixed by Cocteau Twins' guitarist Robin Guthrie. She released two more singles, "Sugar & Spice" and "Sleep", and released her debut EP Sugar & Spice in May. The EP consists of the four previously released singles as well as one additional track, titled "Bad Guy".

In October 2018, Hatchie released "Adored" for Adult Swim's singles series. In February 2019, Hatchie released "Without a Blush". It was followed by two more singles, "Stay with Me" and "Obsessed" and her debut studio album, Keepsake was released in June 2019.

At the start of 2020, she traveled to the U.S. for a two month writing trip with bandmate Joe Agius and producers Jorge Elbrecht and Dan Nigro. During the COVID-19 pandemic, Hatchie worked in a clothes store and a cafe in Australia.

In September 2021, Hatchie signed with Secretly Canadian and released the single "This Enchanted". In January 2022, Hatchie released another single "Quicksand". Her album, Giving the World Away, was released in April 2022. In April 2023, she released a deluxe edition of the album.

Her third studio album, Liquorice, was released in November 2025.

== Musical style ==
Stereogum described Hatchie's music as "a cosmic concoction of dream pop and shoegaze." Her sound has been compared to Cocteau Twins, the Sundays, Mazzy Star, Natalie Imbruglia, and the Cranberries, some of which she has cited as influences. She has also cited My Bloody Valentine, Kate Bush, Alvvays, Siouxsie Sioux, Kylie Minogue, Sky Ferreira, Wolf Alice, Chairlift, and Carly Rae Jepsen among her influences.

== Personal life ==
In November 2021, Hatchie married her longtime partner, bandmate, and musical collaborator Joe Agius (aka RINSE) at Graceland Wedding Chapel in Las Vegas, Nevada. In 2022, she moved to Los Angeles to be closer to her record label and fanbase. Hatchie now lives in Melbourne. She works several days per week at an optometrist selling glasses.

== Discography ==
=== Studio albums ===
List of studio albums, with release date, label, formats, and selected chart positions shown
Title	Details	Peak chart positions
Title	Details	AUS
Keepsake	Released: 21 June 2019; Label: Double Double Whammy, Ivy League, Heavenly; Formats: LP, CD, cassette, digital download, streaming	25
Giving the World Away	Released: 22 April 2022; Label: Ivy League, Secretly Canadian; Formats: LP, CD, cassette, digital download, streaming	51
Liquorice	Released: 7 November 2025; Label: Secretly Canadian; Formats: LP, CD, digital download, streaming	88

=== Extended plays ===
List of extended plays, with release date, label, and formats shown
Title	EP details
Sugar & Spice	Released: 25 May 2018; Label: Double Double Whammy, Ivy League, Heavenly Recordings; Formats: LP, CD, cassette, digital download

=== Singles ===
==== As lead artist ====
List of singles as lead artist, with year and album details shown
Title	Year	Album			
Title	Year	Album	"Try"	2017	Sugar & Spice
"Sure"				2017	Sugar & Spice
"Sugar & Spice"	2018				Sugar & Spice
"Sleep"	2018				Sugar & Spice
"Adored"	2018	Non-album single			
"Without a Blush"	2019	Keepsake			
"Stay with Me"	2019	Keepsake			
"Obsessed"	2019	Keepsake			
"Sometimes Always" (with The Pains of Being Pure at Heart)	2020	Non-album single			
"This Enchanted"	2021	Giving the World Away			
"Crush"	2021	Non-album single			
"Quicksand"	2022	Giving the World Away			
"Giving the World Away"	2022	Giving the World Away			
"Lights On"	2022	Giving the World Away			
"The Rhythm"	2022	Giving the World Away			
"Nosedive" (Note: Available only on the album's DSP deluxe version.)	2022	Giving the World Away			
"Rooftops" (featuring Liam Benzvi)	2023	Giving the World Away			
"Jai Alai – Hatchie Version" (DMA's rework)	2023	Non-album single			
"Lose It Again"	2025	Liquorice			
"Only One Laughing"	2025	Liquorice			
"Sage"	2025	Liquorice			

==== As a featured artist ====
List of singles as featured artist, with year released, lead artist(s), and album details shown
Title	Year	Album			
Title	Year	Album	"Back Into Your Arms" (Rinse featuring Hatchie)	2021	Wherever I Am
"Worlds Unluckiest Guy" (Swim Deep featuring Hatchie)	2022	Familiarise Yourself with Your Closest Exit EP			
"Atonement" (Winter featuring Hatchie)	2022	What Kind of Blue Are You?			
"Damn, I Wish I Was Your Lover" (Methyl Ethel featuring Hatchie)	2022	Non-album single			
"For You, I Will" (George Clanton featuring Hatchie)	2023	Ooh Rap I Ya			
"Headlights On" (Wild Nothing featuring Hatchie)	2023	Hold			
"Argentina" (GUM; credited as Harriette Pilbeam)	2023	Saturnia			
"Real Life" (GUM; credited as Harriette Pilbeam)	2023	Saturnia			

== Awards and nominations ==
=== AIR Awards ===
Year	Nominee / work	Award	Result	Ref.
2019	Herself	Breakthrough Independent Artist	Nominated	
2024	Giving the World Away (Deluxe)	Best Independent Pop Album or EP	Nominated	

=== J Awards ===
Year	Nominee / work	Award	Result	Ref.
2019	Keepsake	Australian Album of the Year	Nominated	

=== National Live Music Awards ===
Year	Nominee / work	Award	Result	Ref.
2019	Hatchie	Live Pop Act of the Year	Nominated	
2019	Hatchie	International Live Achievement (Solo)	Nominated	
