= Giving the World Away =

Studio album by Hatchie
- Released: 22 April 2022
- Recorded: 2020–2021
- Genres: Dream pop; shoegaze
- Length: 49:46
- Label: Secretly Canadian

Hatchie chronology
Keepsake (2019)	Giving the World Away (2022)	Liquorice (2025)

Singles from Giving the World Away
- 1. "This Enchanted" Released: 14 September 2021; 2. "Quicksand" Released: 19 January 2022; 3. "Giving the World Away" Released: 15 February 2022; 4. "Lights On" Released: 22 March 2022; 5. "The Rhythm" Released: 21 April 2022; 6. "Twin" Released: 19 October 2022; 7. "Nosedive" Released: 9 November 2022; 8. "Rooftops" Released: 8 March 2023

Giving the World Away is the second studio album by Australian dream pop musician Hatchie. It was released on 22 April 2022 through Secretly Canadian.

At the AIR Awards of 2024, the album was nominated for Best Independent Pop Album or EP.

== Background and recording ==
After the release of her 2019 debut album Keepsake, Hatchie began working on a second album in February 2020 while in Los Angeles. Due to the COVID-19 lockdown, she was forced to return to Australia at the end of the month. She worked in retail while recording music with her partner Joe Agius at a house in Brisbane. The songwriting process was more collaborative than on Keepsake, as Hatchie was open to working with more co-writers and adding to songs started by or with Agius. After production and mixing was done remotely in Denver by Jorge Elbrecht, the album was completed in 2021.

The production on Giving the World Away updates Hatchie's shoegaze sound with elements of dance music, inspired by British group Saint Etienne. Other influences included New Order, Kylie Minogue, Depeche Mode, and Ray of Light by Madonna. Based on her experience touring Keepsake, she decided to focus on more energetic songs that would carry over well in a live setting.

The digital deluxe edition "embraces a '90s alternative jangle and lush, languid harmonies to become a highlight of an expanded project".

== Release and promotion ==
Giving the World Away was released 22 April 2022 through Secretly Canadian. In support of the album, Hatchie announced a month-long North American tour during May 2022.

"This Enchanted" was released as the album's lead single on 14 September 2021, becoming her first release through Secretly Canadian. The album's cover artwork comes from the music video for "This Enchanted", which was directed by Agius and shows Hatchie in angel wings referencing Baz Luhrmann's 1996 film Romeo + Juliet. Giving the World Away yielded four additional singles: "Quicksand", "Giving the World Away", "Lights On", and "The Rhythm".

On 9 March 2023, she announced the release of the album's deluxe edition with additional five tracks. It was digitally released on 7 April 2023.

== Critical reception ==
Professional ratings
Aggregate scores
Source	Rating
Metacritic	73/100
Review scores
Source	Rating
AllMusic	3.5/5 stars
DIY	4/5 stars
Dork	4/5 stars
Gigwise	7/10 stars
The Guardian	4/5 stars
The Line of Best Fit	7/10
NME	4/5 stars
Paste	7.6/10
Pitchfork	6.7/10
PopMatters	8/10

Giving the World Away received favourable reviews from critics. At Metacritic, which assigns a normalised rating out of 100 to reviews from professional publications, the album has an average score of 75, based on 10 reviews. In his review for The Guardian, Phil Mongredien called it "a winning blend of pop melodies and shoegaze textures". Brady Brickner-Wood of Pitchfork wrote that the album "explores [Hatchie's anxieties and insecurities] with an exacting, if not heavy-handed, touch, mushrooming her once sparkly shoegaze into a brasher, more ambitious sound." For NME, Giselle Au-Nhien Nguyen described Giving the World Away as "an enchanting second album that sounds as good as it feels – a brave statement of self and survival in the face of uncertainty."

== Track listing ==
All tracks are written by Harriette Pilbeam, Joe Agius and the listed co-writers.

Standard edition
No.	Title	Writer(s)	Length
1.	"Lights On"	Jorge Elbrecht	3:57
2.	"This Enchanted"	Elbrecht	3:52
3.	"Twin"	Tony Buchen	4:06
4.	"Take My Hand"		4:16
5.	"The Rhythm"	Elbrecht	4:30
6.	"Quicksand"	Dan Nigro	4:12
7.	"Thinking Of"	Elbrecht	2:05
8.	"Giving the World Away"	Elbrecht	4:46
9.	"The Key"		4:15
10.	"Don't Leave Me in the Rain"		4:16
11.	"Sunday Song"	Zach Fogarty	3:48
12.	"Til We Run Out of Air"		5:43
Total length:			49:46

Deluxe edition (Note: Available only on DSPs.)
No.	Title	Length
13.	"Nosedive"	4:09
14.	"Cast Aside"	4:17
15.	"Rooftops (feat. Liam Benzvi)"	3:53
16.	"Dream On (Country Girl)"	4:02
17.	"The Rhythm (George Clanton Remix)"	4:21
Total length:		1:10:00

== Personnel ==
Credits are adapted from the album's liner notes.

Musicians

- Harriette Pilbeam – vocals (all tracks), guitar (4, 7–10, 12), keyboards (8–11)
- Joe Agius – keyboards (1, 3–6, 8, 9, 11, 12), guitar (2–12), backing vocals (3, 8, 11, 12)
- Jorge Elbrecht – bass (all tracks), guitar (1–7, 9, 11, 12), percussion, programming (1–5, 7–12), keyboards (2), piano (3, 4, 7, 9, 11, 12), backing vocals (5), acoustic guitar (10)
- James Barone – drums (1–5, 7–12)
- Tony Buchen – keyboards (3)
- Dan Nigro – guitar, drum programming, keyboards (6)
- Sam Stewart – guitar (6)

Production

- Jorge Elbrecht – mixing (all tracks), production (1–5, 7–12), additional production (6)
- James Barone – additional production (1–5, 7–12)
- Tony Buchen – additional production (3)
- Joe Agius – additional production (4, 5, 11)
- Dan Nigro – production (6)

== Charts ==
Chart performance for Giving the World Away
Chart (2022)	Peak position
Australian Albums (ARIA)	51
UK Album Downloads (Official Charts)	59
UK Independent Albums (Official Charts)	33
