= Ooh Rap I Ya =

Studio album by George Clanton
- Released: July 28, 2023
- Recorded: 2019–2023
- Genres: Neo-psychedelia; alternative dance; chillwave; baggy; trip hop; hypnagogic pop
- Length: 38:09
- Label: 100% Electronica

George Clanton chronology
George Clanton & Nick Hexum (2020)	Ooh Rap I Ya (2023)	Fauxllennium (2024)

Singles from Ooh Rap I Ya
- 1. "Fucking Up My Life" Released: October 27, 2021; 2. "I Been Young" Released: April 7, 2023; 3. "Justify Your Life" Released: May 26, 2023; 4. "Vapor King / SubReal" Released: June 28, 2023

Ooh Rap I Ya is the third studio album by American electronic musician George Clanton, released on July 28, 2023, by his independent record label 100% Electronica.

== Background ==
On October 7, 2021, Clanton released the single "Fucking Up My Life" ahead of his 2021 headlining tour, featuring his partner and 100% Electronica co-founder Negative Gemini. This was his first solo material released since 2018's Slide, and he announced along with the single that he was working on his third studio album for release sometime the following year. Clanton had already been working on the album for the past two years, and chose to release the song before the tour as it "was written to go off live". Over a year later, on April 7, 2023, Clanton debuted the follow-up single "I Been Young" as a music video on the 100% Electronica Big Stream VR livestream. A third single, "Justify Your Life", was debuted in similar fashion on May 26. Alongside it, Clanton's third album was announced to be titled Ooh Rap I Ya, set for a July 28 release the same year. Pre-orders for the album went live on the 100% Electronica website that same day along with a track list for the album, with it featuring all the previously released singles. The album also was announced to feature Australian singer Hatchie, who Clanton had previously remixed the song "The Rhythm" for on the deluxe edition of her album Giving The World Away earlier that year. On June 30, Clanton released the fourth and final single, "Vapor King / SubReal".

== Composition and writing ==
Clanton stated that the first single, "Fucking Up My Life" was written as a "love letter to performing live", while he called "Justify Your Life" an "attempt at making Grown Up Music about self-realization". Journalists noted that it and the two follow-up singles featured heavy influence from 90s trip hop and radio pop. Clanton rebuked this by saying that the "90s pastiche" was not his intention, and that the music was merely a continuation of "the style and thoughts [he] developed on [his] last full length Slide", although he did admit in another statement that he was "stylistically indebted" to 90s acts like Savage Garden and Seal.

== Reception ==
Professional ratings
Review scores
Source	Rating
Pitchfork	6.6/10
The Needle Drop	8/10
sputnikmusic	4.2/5

In a positive review for sputnikmusic, Erwann S. summarizes the album as "vaporwave for boomers". They notice that Clanton leans more into the late 80s/early 90s pop musical style, and less into the chillwave approach more prominent in his previous albums. Commenting on the blend of pop and chillwave present in the first half of the album, Erwann says that "'I Been Young' thus fuses baggy percussions with Clanton's traditional chillwave aesthetic, but contrary to his previous output, the POP elements are taking center stage to offer the anthemic chorus his soundscape always deserved." However, Erwann remarks that "Ooh Rap I Ya is only sometimes working towards the poppiest of the poppiest; some tunes rather delve into a triphoppy-fuelled rave with progressive linings." Erwann praises the blend of nostalgia-driven, vaporwave-inspired music on the album as a whole, and notes that it can simultaneously be identified as part of the vaporwave spectrum and be felt as a nostalgic reminder of the liberating 80s pop era.

In a review for Pitchfork, Sam Goldner negatively compared the album to Clanton's previous projects, saying that it "struggles to find new or better ways to make the pieces fit". He gave praise to the singles from the album, calling "I Been Young" a "best-case scenario", while calling the latter half of the album "hard not to tune out" due to repetitive use of similar drum samples and later songs incorporating "sing-songy chanting".

== Track listing ==
All tracks are written by George Clanton, except "F.U.M.L." written by George Clanton and Neggy Gemmy.

Ooh Rap I Ya track listing
No.	Title	Length
1.	"Everything I Want"	2:51
2.	"Justify Your Life"	3:25
3.	"Punching Down"	3:27
4.	"I Been Young"	4:59
5.	"You Hold the Key and I Found It"	4:55
6.	"Vapor King"	3:00
7.	"SubReal^{[a]}"	2:30
8.	"F.U.M.L." (with Neggy Gemmy)	3:46
9.	"Ooh Rap I Ya"	3:52
10.	"For You, I Will" (with Hatchie)	5:24
Total length:		38:09

Note

- ^{^[a]} On streaming versions of the album, Vapor King and SubReal are combined as one track called "Vapor King / SubReal", reducing the total track count to 9. The combined track is identical in content and length.

== Personnel ==
- George Clanton – performance, mixing, recording
- Howie Weinberg – mastering
