= Software (disambiguation) =

Software usually refers to instructions for computer hardware to execute.

Software may also refer to:

- IEEE Software, a magazine
- Software (novel), part of the Ware Tetralogy, a 1982 cyber-punk novel by Rudy Rucker
- Software (album), 1984 album by Grace Slick
- Software (band), a German electronic duo active between 1984 and 2000
- Software, Etc., a predecessor of the video game retailer GameStop
- GNOME Software, a GNOME software package for managing software installation
