= TDJ =

TDJ or tdj may refer to:

- TDJ, the IATA code for Tadjoura Airport, Djibouti
- tdj, the ISO 639-3 code for Tajio language, Sulawesi, Indonesia
- TDJ, stage name of Canadian DJ Geneviève Ryan-Martel
