= Small Black =

American indie band

- Origin: Brooklyn, New York
- Genres: Chillwave, synth pop, indie pop
- Labels: 100% Electronica, Jagjaguwar
- Members: Ryan Heyner; Josh Kolenik; Juan Pieczanski; Jeff Curtin
- Website: small-black.com

Small Black is an American indie band from Brooklyn, New York. They are currently signed to the 100% Electronica record label. The band consists of Josh Kolenik (lead vocals/guitar), Ryan Heyner (guitar/keyboards), Juan Pieczanski (bass/guitar), and Jeff Curtin (drums).

After releasing the critically acclaimed Small Black EP, the band signed to Jagjaguwar to release their debut full length, New Chain (2010).

Their second full length, Limits of Desire was released in May 2013, with the single "No Stranger" a mainstay on satellite radio.

The band has toured consistently since 2010, participating in numerous festivals such as Primavera Sound Festival, Fun Fun Fun Fest, Capitol Hill Block Party, and the SXSW Music Festival.

== History ==
Josh Kolenik and Ryan Heyner formed the band while experimenting with lo-fi and loop-based recording techniques. Kolenik cites the Human League, OMD, David Bowie and Wu-Tang Clan as influences on the group.

The initial EP was recorded in Kolenik's uncle's attic with vintage keyboards and samplers, during the winter of 2008-2009 as Uncle Matt made surfboards underneath them. Guitarist Juan Pieczanski and drummer Jeff Curtin, both from Washington D.C., met while attending Columbia University. The earliest collaborations of the entire group began years prior to the band's formation during after-hours recording sessions in a post-production film studio located in the Brill Building.

After the band's initial release, they supported Washed Out on tour in 2010, also performing with him on stage during that tour.

== Musical style ==
Their sound is commonly described as belonging to the chillwave genre though the band's members don't label themselves as such. The band began with an emphasis on lo-fi sounds and distorted textures in their initial release, but has since adopted a more varied approach, expanding to include a mix of hi and lo-fi sounds, synthetic and acoustic instruments. The underlying elements of synth-heavy production and melodic, lyrical vocal style have been a fixture of the band’s sound throughout their entire catalogue. All the band's releases to date have been self-produced.

== Other contributions/collaborations ==
The band has provided remixes for Health, Washed Out, and Frankie Rose.

In 2010 they released the Moon Killer mixtape, a loose collection of sample-based tracks featuring contributions from Heems and Star Slinger.

Jeff Curtin provided the drums for Wild Nothing’s second studio release, Nocturne (2012), and is credited as a sound engineer/producer for his work with Vampire Weekend and Those Darlins.

== Discography ==
=== Studio albums ===
- New Chain (Jagjaguwar, 2010)
- Limits Of Desire (Jagjaguwar, 2013)
- Best Blues (Jagjaguwar, 2015)
- Cheap Dreams (100% Electronica, 2021)

=== Extended plays ===
- Small Black EP (CassClub/Jagjaguwar, 2009)
- Real People EP (Jagjaguwar, 2014)

=== Mixtapes ===
- Moon Killer Mixtape (Free download, 2011)

=== Singles ===
- Despicable Dogs EP (Transparent Records, 2009)
- Photojournalist b/w Sun Was High (So Was I) 7-inch EP (Jagjaguwar, 2010)

=== Splits ===
- Washed Out/Small Black split (Lovepump United Records), 2010
