= Dark Web (disambiguation) =

The Dark Web is the World Wide Web content that exists on darknets.

Dark Web may also refer to:

- "Dark Web" (Marvel Comics), a 2022–2023 Spider-Man and X-Men crossover storyline
  - Dark Web (The Amazing Spider-Man), a 2023 collected edition
- Dark Web (album), a 2014 album by Giant Claw
- Dark Web: Cicada 3301, a 2021 American film
- Dark Web, a 2018 Indian TV series directed by Sayantan Ghosal
