= The Creases =

Australian indie rock band

- Origin: Brisbane, Queensland, Australia
- Genres: Indie rock, Shoegaze, Dream pop
- Years active: 2013–present
- Labels: Rough Trade; Liberation
- Members: Joe Agius; Jarod Mahon; Aimon Clark; Gabriel Webster
- Past members: Bridie McQueen

The Creases are an Australian indie rock band formed in Brisbane in April 2013. They have released one studio album to date.

== History ==
The Creases formed in Brisbane in April 2013 initially a duo, with Joe Agius on lead vocals and guitar and Jarod Mahon on bass guitar and vocals; they were joined in October by Aimon Clark on lead guitar and Bridie McQueen on drums. In 2014 McQueen was replaced on drums by Gabriel Webster. They performed at Australian festivals and supported gigs by Franz Ferdinand.

The band issued their debut extended play, Gradient, in July 2014. It was recorded in the previous December with Simon Berckelman producing. Beat Magazine's Simon Welby felt, "[its] sunny and relatively slick production quality is a marked sonic advance from the tracks that initially brought them attention... Stylistically, the EP steps beyond the jangly garage pop of 'I Won't Wait' to align itself with acts of the shoegaze and dream pop ilk (Yo La Tengo, The Jesus and Mary Chain, Ride)."

In July 2017, The Creases released their debut studio album, Tremolow, which reached the ARIA Top 100 Physical Albums and No. 21 on the ARIA Hitseekers Albums charts. Jack Gobbe of Outlet Mag observed, "With charming song writing and catchy hooks that are often emphasised by stirring backing vocals, you'll soon find a significant chunk of the record ringing in your head for days to come."

== Members ==
- Joe Agius – guitar, vocals (2013–present)
- Jarod Mahon – bass guitar, vocals (2013–present)
- Aimon Clark – guitar, vocals (2013–present)
- Bridie McQueen – drums 2013–14
- Gabriel Webster – drums (2014–present)

== Discography ==
=== Studio albums ===
Title	Details
Tremolow	Released: July 2017; Label: Liberation Music (LMCD0327); Format: CD, LP, DD

=== Extended plays ===
Title	Details
Gradient	Released: July 2014; Label: Liberation Music (LMCD0243); Format: CD, LP, DD

=== Singles ===
Title	Year	Album
"I Won't Wait"	2013	non album single
"Static Lines"	2014	Gradient
"Point"	2015	Tremolow
"Impact"	2016	Tremolow
"Everybody Knows"	2017	Tremolow
"Is It Love"	2017	Tremolow
"Answer to"	2017	Tremolow

== Awards and nominations ==
=== Queensland Music Awards ===
The Queensland Music Awards (previously known as Q Song Awards) are annual awards celebrating Queensland, Australia's brightest emerging artists and established legends. They commenced in 2006.

Year	Nominee / work	Award	Result (wins only)
2016	Joe Agius (The Creases)	The BOQ People's Choice Award Most Promising Male Songwriter	Won
