= Neggy Gemmy =

American musician (born 1988)

- Also known as: Negative Gemini
- Born: Lindsey Elise French; November 25, 1986 (age 39); Richmond, Virginia, U.S.
- Genres: Electropop; vaporwave; dance pop; outsider house; dream pop; trip hop; shoegaze
- Occupation: Musician
- Instruments: guitar; vocals
- Works: Discography
- Years active: 2013–present
- Label: 100% Electronica
- Spouse: George Clanton (m. 2020-present)
- Website: www.100percentelectronica.com

Lindsey Elise French (born November 25, 1986), known professionally as Neggy Gemmy (shortened from her previous moniker, Negative Gemini), is an American electronic musician and singer-songwriter. Alongside George Clanton she established the independent record label 100% Electronica in 2015, and in 2019 they launched the first vaporwave music festival, 100% ElectroniCON.

== Biography ==
In 2014 she moved from Virginia to Brooklyn. In 2015 she established the record label 100% Electronica along with her now husband & fellow musician George Clanton. She and Clanton both hail from Virginia and played their first show together in 2011 alongside other artists such as Skylar Spence. In 2016, she would release her self-produced album Body Work via 100% Electronica to critical acclaim. French has a degree in fashion but despite this has never had a job in the fashion industry and went straight to pursuing music.

In 2019, they launched 100% ElectroniCON, the first vaporwave music festival.

She originally went by the name Negative Gemini, which she picked by writing 50 words on a piece of paper and picking two of them. She changed her name to Neggy Gemmy in 2021 alongside the release of a new song titled "California" which was the lead single to her 2023 album CBD Reiki Moonbeam. Her stage name originated as a nickname originally given to her by Brad Petering of TV Girl while touring in 2019. She changed it to her stage name as she related to the playfulness of the new name and felt it represented the next era of her music.

She has opened up for artists such as George Clanton, Kero Kero Bonito, TV Girl and most recently The Neighborhood on their 2026 Wourld Tour,

== Discography ==
=== Studio albums ===
- Forget Your Future (2013)
- Body Work (2016)
- CBD Reiki Moonbeam (2023)
- She Comes From Nowhere (2025)

=== Extended plays ===
- Real Virtual Unison (2015)
- Bad Baby (2018)
- Utopia (2021)
