= Sugar & Spice (EP) =

EP by Hatchie
- Released: 25 May 2018
- Recorded: 2016–2018
- Genre: Dream pop
- Length: 19:26
- Labels: Double Double Whammy; Ivy League; Heavenly
- Producer: John Castle

Hatchie chronology
| Sugar & Spice (2018) | Keepsake (2019) |

Singles from Sugar & Spice
- 1. "Try" Released: 4 May 2017; 2. "Sure" Released: 14 November 2017; 3. "Sugar & Spice" Released: 4 April 2018; 4. "Sleep" Released: 27 April 2018; 5. "Bad Guy" Released: 27 June 2018

Sugar & Spice is the debut extended play (EP) by Australian singer-songwriter Hatchie, released on 25 May 2018 through Double Double Whammy, Ivy League, and Heavenly Recordings. All five songs from the EP were released as singles and were accompanied by music videos.

== Background and release ==
Before debuting her solo career, Hatchie played bass and sung backing vocals in the bands Babaganouj and Go Violets. Aspiring to pursue something with a different production, songwriting and vocal style, she wrote "Try" in early 2015 and recorded it in 2016. The song was eventually uploaded on 4 May 2017 to Triple J Unearthed and hit the top of its charts and garnered her significant attention in Australia. She then signed with Ivy League and released the second single from the EP, "Sure", on 14 November 2017. The song was remixed in February 2018 by Cocteau Twins' guitarist Robin Guthrie. After also signing with Double Double Whammy and Heavenly Recordings in January 2018, Hatchie released the third single "Sugar & Spice" on 4 April and the fourth single "Sleep" on 27 April. The EP was released on CD, vinyl, cassette, digital download and streaming services on 25 May 2018 through Double Double Whammy in North America, Ivy League Records in Australia and New Zealand, and Heavenly Recordings everywhere else. On 27 June, Hatchie released a music video for the last single, "Bad Guy", and announced her first North American tour. On 4 July, a limited CD release in Japan containing five bonus tracks of remixes and demos of songs from the EP was released.

== Writing and recording ==
In early 2015, Hatchie wrote the first song from the EP, "Try", and followed it with "Sleep" and "Sugar & Spice", while writing of "Bad Guy" lasted from August 2016 until late 2017. Discussing the writing process, she stated that each song was written differently, sometimes building off of a melody or hook, and sometimes starting with a specific chord structure or lyric. The writing for "Try" began with the guitar parts, whereas the other songs started with synth or vocals. Hatchie said the songs were written more for herself than for a specific project, in an effort to explore feelings of vulnerability and ecstasy she had previously suppressed. She wanted the songs to sound "lush, sparkly, and recreate euphoric feelings I experienced falling in love for the first time."

After writing the songs, Hatchie sent her demos to her partner Joe Agius who helped her develop them to fuller songs before recording with John Castle in Melbourne. She stated that Agius' production and writing additions "achieved the perfect sound I was searching for, giving me confidence to start taking the songs more seriously and continue writing," and that the two "helped shape the sound you can hear in each track, bringing life to each song in its own special way." Recording of the EP began in March 2016 with the recording of "Try" and lasted until early 2018. Some of the songs were done in one or two sessions, but were often done over a few weeks.

== Music and lyrics ==
Sugar & Spice opens with "Sure", a "heady blast of jangle pop" with shimmering guitars wash through in layers. Regarding the song's lyrics, Hatchie said, "that one is about other people. I haven't been through that push and pull of breaking up and making up over and over again, but it's a concept that fascinates me as I've watched so many other people go through it – in real life and in books and films." The second track, "Sleep", is a song which DIY described as a "climactic follow-up built around shuffling beats and heroic choruses, with a smoky hook that recalls Depeche Mode's 80s classic "Just Can't Get Enough". Lyrically, the track is about the idea of trying to speak to someone in their sleep, representing a more general and fictional concept rather than being about Hatchie's personal relationship.

The title track features shoegazey guitars which have been said to reminiscent My Bloody Valentine. Hatchie said that the song was written about her experience of first falling in love. The fourth track and the lead single, "Try" was described by PopMatters as a "gleaming, blissful summer jam that deservedly exploded online last year." The closing track, "Bad Guy", is the only track that wasn't released prior to the EP. Exclaim said the song recalls late '80s the Cure, whereas its lyrics, "which follows a protagonist who pushes the object of their affection for a deeper commitment only to have them pull away, looks at the scene from dual perspectives, asking who the bad guy was in this situation when both parties were try to their feelings."

== Critical reception ==
Professional ratings
Aggregate scores
| Source | Rating |
|---|---|
| Metacritic | 77/100 |
Review scores
| Source | Rating |
| DIY | 4/5 stars |
| Exclaim! | 8/10 |
| Pitchfork | 7.5/10 |
| PopMatters | 7/10 stars |

At Metacritic, which assigns a normalized rating out of 100 to reviews from mainstream publications, Sugar & Spice received an average score of 77 based on four reviews, indicating "generally favorable reviews". In his review for DIY magazine, James Bentley wrote, "It comes naturally to her - "all my songs start with singing," she says - which makes sense given the vocal strengths present across these five tracks. With a finessed production tying everything together, the result is pretty ecstatic." PopMatters' Adam Finley described the sound of the EP as "shoegazey dream pop", "jangly chillwave" and "hazy but poppy", stating: "No single modifier can describe the sound of Hatchie's debut EP." He concluded his review saying that "Sugar & Spice shimmers with the glitz of Brisvegas and the energy of an artist who refuses to be defined." Ian Gormely of Exclaim! praised the EP, saying Hatchie "managed to capture lightning in a bottle."

=== Accolades ===
| Publication | List | Rank | Ref. |
|---|---|---|---|
| Bandcamp Daily | The Best Albums of 2018 | 17 | |
| Exclaim! | Top 11 EPs of the Year | 6 | |
| Stereogum | Best EPs of 2018 | —N/a | |
| Under the Radar | Top 100 Albums of 2018 | 36 | |

== Track listing ==
All lyrics written by Harriette Pilbeam; all music composed 90% by Pilbeam and 10% by Joe Agius, except "Try", composed 85% by Pilbeam and 15% by Agius.

| No. | Title | Length |
|---|---|---|
| 1. | "Sure" | 4:09 |
| 2. | "Sleep" | 3:22 |
| 3. | "Sugar & Spice" | 3:09 |
| 4. | "Try" | 4:10 |
| 5. | "Bad Guy" | 4:36 |
| Total length: | | 19:26 |

Sugar & Spice – Japanese edition (bonus tracks)
| No. | Title | Length |
|---|---|---|
| 6. | "Try" (Gauci remix) |
| 7. | "Sure" (Robin Guthrie remix) |
| 8. | "Sure" (demo) |
| 9. | "Sugar & Spice" (demo) |
| 10. | "Bad Guy" (demo) |

== Personnel ==
Credits adapted from the liner notes of Sugar & Spice.

- Harriette Pilbeam – vocals, electric guitar
- John Castle – drums, percussion, electric guitar, bass, production, recording, mixing
- Joe Agius – keyboards, electric guitar, synthesizer, recording, artwork
- Ben Smith – drums, percussion
- Miro Mackie – recording
- Brian Lucey – mastering

== Release history ==
| Region | Date | Edition | Label | Ref. |
|---|---|---|---|---|
| North America | 25 May 2018 | Standard | Double Double Whammy | |
| Australia | 25 May 2018 | Standard | Ivy League Records | |
| New Zealand | 25 May 2018 | Standard | Ivy League Records | |
| Various | 25 May 2018 | Standard | Heavenly Recordings | |
| Japan | 4 July 2018 | Limited | Heavenly Recordings | |
