= The Greatest Album of All Time =

Studio album by Sophia Stel
- Released: October 16, 2026
- Length: 46:18
- Label: A24
- Producers: Billy Lemos; Sophia Stel

Sophia Stel chronology
How to Win at Solitaire (2025)	The Greatest Album of All Time (2026)

Singles from The Greatest Album of All Time
- 1. "Bitches Talk Shit" Released: April 22, 2026; 2. "Molly in the Club" Released: June 26, 2026; 3. "Now I've Got a Lot You Know" Released: August 14, 2026; 4. "I Do" Released: September 10, 2026

Professional ratings
Review scores
Source	Rating
Paste	B-
Pitchfork	8.0/10

The Greatest Album of All Time is the debut studio album by the Canadian musician Sophia Stel. It was released on October 16, 2026, through A24 Music. It was preceded by the singles "Bitches Talk Shit", "Molly in the Club", "Now I've Got a Lot You Know", and "I Do".

== Background ==
Sophia Stel released her first two EPs, Object Permanence and How to Win at Solitaire, in 2024 and 2025 respectively.

== Critical reception ==
The album received positive reviews from critics. Walden Green writing for Pitchfork gave the album a score of 8.0/10, writing that Stel's "littlest production details so much feeling it's like they're radioactive". Hellen Ding in a review for Still Listening described the album as "a victory lap for an artist on the rise".

In a more critical review for Paste, Cassidy Sollazzo noted that "some of Stel's arrangements feel less distinctive, with her reference points becoming a little too recognizable", but concluded that "the album gives [Stel] reason to be optimistic about where she's headed".

== Track listing ==
Credits adapted from Tidal. All tracks written and produced by Sophia Stel. Additional producers listed below.

The Greatest Album of All Time track listing
No.	Title	Producer(s)	Length
1.	"On My Dick"		1:51
2.	"Molly in the Club"		3:36
3.	"Like a Kite"		3:48
4.	"Bitches Talk Shit"		3:39
5.	"Better Believe It"		5:06
6.	"I'll Walk"		4:31
7.	"15 Hours Away"		3:35
8.	"I Do"	Billy Lemos	3:33
9.	"Wedding Song"		3:21
10.	"Now I've Got a Lot You Know"		5:10
11.	"Power"		3:53
12.	"Burn"		4:15
Total length:			46:18
