= Galen Tipton =

American hyperpop musician and sound producer

- Also known as: recovery girl
- Genres: Hyperpop; ambient; sound collage; As recovery girl: Digital hardcore; breakcore
- Occupations: Musician, Sound Producer
- Years active: 2010s - present
- Labels: DESKPOP; Orange Milk Records
- Website: o0o0o0o0.bandcamp.com//

Galen Tipton, also known as Recovery Girl, is an American musician. She is the founder of the Community Garden record label. Her sound has been described as an experimental electronica fusion of ASMR sounds, IDM and the hyperreality focus of hyperpop. Her music has gone viral on the TikTok platform.

== Life and work ==
Tipton grew up in a small farm town, where she was "one of the weird kids" who spent a lot of time immersed in the world of fiction novels and video games. She considers this an influence on her music, which she has branded in the realm of fantasy and science fiction.

She was first inspired to make music playing Guitar Hero 2 as a child.

According to Tipton she started the recovery girl project as a method of self therapy for working through her trauma. She chose the name "Recovery Girl" after the My Hero Academia character of the same name because she identified with her healing powers. Galen Tipton is a transgender woman and was encouraged by a trend of dissonant, pitch shifted vocals in hyperpop to express herself without vocal dysphoria under the "recovery girl" name.

Tipton is part of a duo called "Digifae" together with singer/producer Diana Starshine.

=== Sound ===
Tipton's music has been described as "hyperactive and intentionally overstimulating digital orchestral soundscapes". Sam Goldner of Pitchfork described her music as "...largely improvised chords and melodies acting secondarily to the constant rush of squelching synthesis underneath. A hypercute take on avant-garde synth music". Her music has been praised by figures like Iggy Pop and David Byrne.

Tipton said in an interview that she intended to make accessible experimental electronic music that didn't take itself seriously to invite people to explore stranger forms of music, partly in reaction to the more self serious inaccessible experimental music she was interested in at the start of her career, .

=== Influences ===
Tipton has cited SOPHIE as an influence for her sound design, textural elements, experimentation and "Her whole public coming out, and all of the songs related to her trans-ness and identity gave me so much life, as a non-binary, trans girl producer". She has also cited the formlessness of early Arca music and her interest in nature aesthetics and folklore, ASMR and field recordings. Other influences include minimalist composer Steve Reich, 100 gecs, Machine Girl, Street Sects, Deli Girls, and Giant Claw.

She has cited the Japanese footwork music scene as an influence, stating that "I don't consider my music footwork, by any stretch, but I feel a strong creative kinship with the Japanese experimental scene that dabbles in footwork. To me, the music these artists make sounds like pure freedom and play, and that's the space I like to create from—one of unrestricted expression and emotion."

== Discography ==
=== As Galen Tipton ===
Year	Title	Label	Notes	Ref
2016	Spell Books O1 ::: Ideonella Sakaiensis	Them There Records		
2017	treats 2!			
2018	QUEER FLESH	postgeography		
2018	Nightbath	DESKPOP		
2019	fake meat	Orange Milk		
2020	Ungoliant	Orange Milk		
2020	Goddex	Orange Milk		
2020	carepackage			
2021	You Right	Upclose Records		
2022	Nymph Tones			
2022	cycles			
2022	phone mouth music			
2023	brain scratch			
2023	scarepackage			
2024	You Like Music	Ghost Diamond	with Keith Rankin (as Death's Dynamic Shroud)	
2024	keepsakeFM	Orange Milk	with Holly Waxwing	
2024	clean dreams			
2025	dewCLAWS	Orange Milk	with Shmu	
2025	the Death of Music	Orange Milk		
2026	Mobile Suit Gym Rat	Ghost Diamond	with Keith Rankin (as Death's Dynamic Shroud)	
2026	tide pool bath			
2026	dreamweaver		with Junior Astronaut	
2026	Nu Jock Swing			
2026	ACROBATS IN THE NIGHT GARDEN	Orange Milk	With Shmu and Andy Loebs	

=== As recovery girl ===
Year	Title	Label	Notes	Ref
2020	recovery girl			
2021	recovery girl & friends (mixtape)			
2021	Nausea Pop, Vol. 1			
2022	Grit Ur Teeth (mixtape)		with Atlas Moe	
2022	Nausea Pop, Vol. 2			
2022	Nausea Pop, Vol. 3			
2024	Night of Fire	Orange Milk	as part of ---__--____ with Seth Graham and More Eaze	

=== As Digifae ===
Year	Title	Label	Ref
2022	digifae		
