= 100% Electronica (album) =

Studio album by George Clanton
- Released: September 25, 2015
- Recorded: 2014–2015
- Genres: Vaporwave; chillwave; synth-pop
- Length: 38:21
- Label: 100% Electronica
- Producer: George Clanton

George Clanton chronology
100% Electronica (2015)	Slide (2018)

100% Electronica is the debut studio album by American electronic musician George Clanton, released on September 25, 2015 by his independent record label of the same name as the album.

== Production ==
Although Clanton had previously released albums as Mirror Kisses and ESPRIT 空想, 100% Electronica is the first album released under his real name which attempts to combine the sounds of his previous records.

== Reception ==
Professional ratings
Review scores
Source	Rating
Acid Stag	5/5 stars

100% Electronica has received favorable reviews from music critics. Michael Tyler wrote for Study Breaks that the album "displays Clanton's ability to create soaring and dramatic pop music as both a songwriter and producer." Natalia Morawski from Acid Stag wrote, "100% Electronica is a gorgeous, glossy combustion of the old and new", and that "it's boisterous and coloured by the best of 80s post-disco funk. Even his vocals are a nod to bands like Tears [for] Fears, but Clanton's vocals don't cut through as clearly as one would have in a pop song, but rather his vocals are an instrument themselves, a charm Clanton has retained from his previous DIY-pop records. [...] this is Clanton at his most structured". Gorilla vs. Bear wrote, "[Clanton] seems to have a similar uncanny knack as artists like John Maus and Ariel Pink for creating soaring, unabashedly dramatic classic pop". Tim Gagnon of Flood Magazine wrote, "100% [Electronica] was Clanton at both his most accessible and alien, reaching for the stratosphere with his histrionic croon tied to pop choruses." Critics compared its sound to 1980s synth-pop acts such as New Order, OMD and A-ha. Fact selected 100% Electronica as their "Bandcamp Release of the Month" for September 2015. The column's editor, Miles Bowe wrote, "100% Electronica often sounds like what chillwave could have used before it imploded. An artist who is serious and funny and committed in all the ways the artists who failed the genre weren't."

== Track listing ==
All music is composed by George Clanton.

No.	Title	Length
1.	"Never Late Again"	4:11
2.	"Keep a Secret"	2:49
3.	"Did I Flounder?"	3:59
4.	"Purity"	1:04
5.	"Wonder Gently"	5:42
6.	"Bleed"	5:05
7.	"Warmspot"	4:24
8.	"It Makes the Babies Want to Cry"	3:38
9.	"Innocence"	2:04
10.	"Kill You in Bed"	5:19

Deluxe edition bonus tracks
No.	Title	Length
11.	"Make You Cry"	5:25
12.	"Innocence" (Alternate)	2:01
13.	"Kill You in Bed" (Alternate)	3:55
14.	"Persuasion"	3:19
15.	"Never Late Again" (Alternate)	4:13
16.	"Did I Flounder?" (Alternate)	3:55
17.	"Notice Me"	3:33
18.	"Bleed" (Alternate)	4:48
19.	"It Makes the Babies Want to Cry" (CHINA Remix)	2:31
