= Keepsake (Hatchie album) =

Studio album by Hatchie
- Released: 21 June 2019
- Genre: Dream pop
- Length: 45:14
- Labels: Double Double Whammy; Ivy League; Heavenly
- Producer: John Castle

Hatchie chronology
Sugar & Spice (2018)	Keepsake (2019)	Giving the World Away (2022)

Singles from Keepsake
- 1. "Without a Blush" Released: 26 February 2019; 2. "Stay with Me" Released: 2 April 2019; 3. "Obsessed" Released: 16 May 2019

Keepsake is the debut studio album by Australian musician Hatchie, released on 21 June 2019, through Double Double Whammy, Ivy League and Heavenly Recordings. The album was preceded by the singles "Without a Blush", "Stay With Me", and "Obsessed".

== Release and promotion ==
On 26 February 2019, Hatchie announced the release of her debut studio album Keepsake alongside a pre-order. The announcement was accompanied by the release of the lead single "Without a Blush" and its music video, as well as spring tour dates. On 2 April 2019, Hatchie released "Stay With Me" as the second single from the album, with a music video also released on the same day. On 16 May 2019, Hatchie released "Obsessed" as the third single from the album also with an accompanying music video. North American fall tour dates were announced the same day.

== Critical reception ==
Professional ratings
Aggregate scores
Source	Rating
Metacritic	80/100
Review scores
Source	Rating
AllMusic	4/5 stars
Consequence of Sound	B+
DIY	4/5 stars
Exclaim!	8/10
The Guardian	3/5 stars
The Line of Best Fit	8.5/10
Pitchfork	6.5/10
PopMatters	9/10 stars
Uncut	4/5 stars
Under the Radar	8.5/10

Keepsake received universal acclaim from music critics. At Metacritic, which assigns a normalised rating out of 100 to reviews from mainstream publications, the album received an average score of 80, based on fifteen reviews. PopMatters's Dave Heaton said, "Keepsake contains nihilism and optimism at once. This tender, overwhelming pop music has a way of feeling like the soundtrack to the end of the world." Michael Watkins of Under the Radar called it "a record destined to sit at the beginning of a promising legacy in years to come, as Hatchie continues to create jangling sonic comfort food far into the future." The Line of Best Fit critic Craig Howieson stated, "Keepsake has an inexplicable familiarity even as it bursts with new ideas. It is a document capable of throwing us into our own pasts, the perfect score for the movies we make in our minds."

LAura Dzubay of Consequence of sound wrote, "The industrial and atmospheric elements of the album all convey a sense of searching and often of rushing away from one thing and toward another. Even the blurred cover image of Hatchie suggests a feeling of constantly being in motion. It is through this searching and continual movement that Hatchie etches her own lines to define her persona through her music, constantly propelling herself and her ideas in new directions and trusting that we'll keep up." DIY's Cady Siregar said Hatchie "writes and wears her heart on her sleeve, half-singing, half-sighing through her songs with wide-eyed candour, shining through such swoon-worthy dream- pop. At some point, you'll wonder if it was Hatchie's heartache and pain that was written about, or your own." Exclaim! writer Chris Gee said, "Keepsake marks an assertive, confident step forward for Hatchie and Pilbeam is well on her way to carving out her own storied path."

Writing for AllMusic, Heather Phares stated that "as Hatchie exceeds the expectations set by Sugar & Spice, Keepsake reflects her growth into an even more confident and varied artist." Under the Radar's Lisa-Marie Ferla wrote, "While Pilbeam's gorgeous, dreamy melodies remain her main strength, a longer running time give her space to play with different ideas." In a more mixed review, Pitchfork's Arielle Gordon said, "Keepsake is an album filled with small, inspired moments like this, but they don’t add up to much. Sugary but hollow, Keepsake melts like cotton candy, dissolving on impact."

== Track listing ==
All tracks written by Harriette Pilbeam and Joseph Agius, except "Secret", co-written by John Castle.

No.	Title	Length
1.	"Not That Kind"	3:50
2.	"Without a Blush"	4:59
3.	"Her Own Heart"	3:55
4.	"Obsessed"	5:14
5.	"Unwanted Guest"	4:56
6.	"Secret"	4:04
7.	"Kiss the Stars"	4:11
8.	"Stay with Me"	4:55
9.	"When I Get Out"	4:33
10.	"Keep"	4:37
Total length:		45:14

== Personnel ==
Credits adapted from AllMusic.

- John Castle – production, mixing
- Brian Lucey – mastering
- Joe Agius - design
- Sophie Hur – artwork

== Release history ==
Region	Date	Label	Ref.
North America	21 June 2019	Double Double Whammy	
Australia	21 June 2019	Ivy League Records	
New Zealand	21 June 2019	Ivy League Records	
Various	21 June 2019	Heavenly Recordings	
