= Death's Dynamic Shroud =

American electronic and vaporwave trio

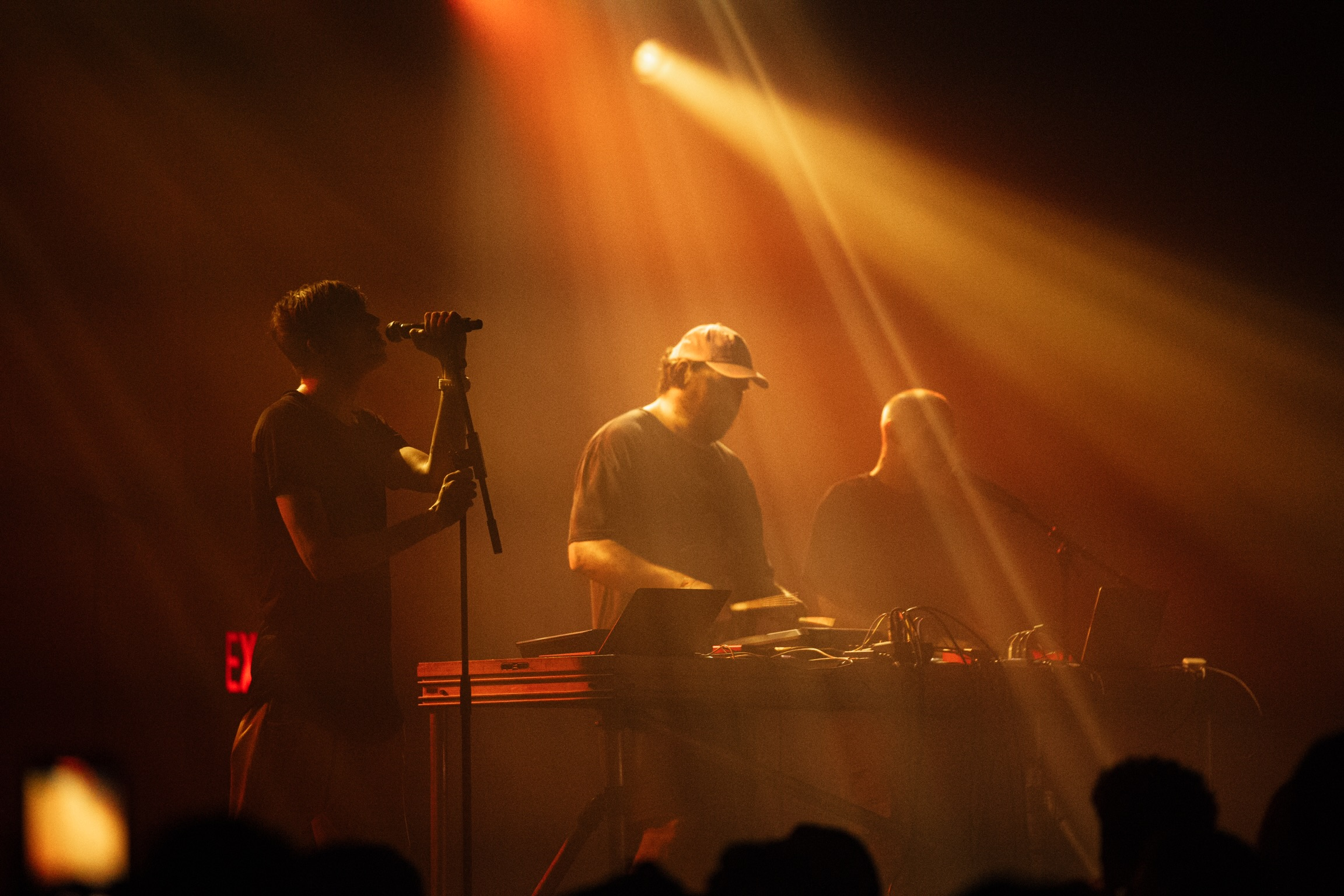
- Tech Honors (left), Keith Rankin (center), and James Webster (right) performing as Death's Dynamic Shroud in 2023

Background information
- Origin: Dayton, Ohio
- Genres: Vaporwave; synth-pop; art-pop
- Years active: 2013–present
- Labels: 100% Electronica; Dream Catalogue; Geometric Lullaby; Ghost Diamond; Orange Milk Records
- Members: James Webster; Tech Honors; Keith Rankin

Death's Dynamic Shroud (stylized in all lowercase; informally referred to as DDS; also known as death's dynamic shroud.wmv under specific releases) is an American electronic and vaporwave trio consisting of James Webster, Tech Honors, and Keith Rankin. The band releases a large amount of music regularly as sample-driven mixtapes under the .wmv moniker, in addition to releasing more standard mainline albums.

The band's conception started with just James Webster and Tech Honors in late 2013, releasing their first mixtape (by James) on January 2, 2014. Keith Rankin joined later in August that same year in the co-creation of the first mainline album 신세기 EVANGELIS with James Webster. However, James Webster and Tech Honors had been creating music together and independently, for several years prior. In 2017, with the release of their album Heavy Black Heart, the group used the name, 'death's dynamic shroud' for mainline albums, and 'death's dynamic shroud.wmv' for their NUWRLD mixtape series.

== History ==
Since their teens, Honors and Webster played together in the space rock band, The Sailing, with Honors on vocals and keyboard, and Webster on vocals and guitar.

In early 2011, Rankin founded Orange Milk Records with Seth Graham.

In 2015, the album I'll Try Living Like This, was released digital and CD-R. Unlike previous Death's Dynamic Shroud albums by Rankin or Webster, I'll Try Living Like This was not produced using the Portastudio, in order to complement the CD-R release. It was ranked #15 out of 50 on FACT Magazine's Top 50 Best Albums of 2015.

== Modern Conception ==
In 2017 they released Heavy Black Heart under Orange Milk Records, and marked the group's first album with all three members working together. It also marked a slight departure from vaporwaves' typically lo-fi production while still retaining its sample-heavy roots. The band regards the release as an inflection point that defined their creative structure, and saw more standardization of release names and collaborations.

Honors and Webster would feature together as death's dynamic shroud on the 2018 Neo Gaia Phantasy Tour in Japan, alongside other musicians in the vaporwave scene Equip and R23X. The tour visited Okazaki, Kobe, Kyoto, Osaka, and Tokyo. The setlist played on the tour would later be re-recorded and mastered as a studio album in 2019, Live From Japan, featuring remade songs from previous albums and mixtapes alongside new material. Webster would return for the second Neo Gaia Phantasy Tour in 2019, although Honors would not be able to attend.

In late 2020 the NUWRLD Mixtape Club, a Bandcamp subscription service which allowed members access to exclusive death's dynamic shroud mixtapes on a monthly basis was opened to the public. For the first year of the mixtape club, mixtapes were produced by Honors and Webster, alternating each month. Rankin would release his first mixtape for the club, Faith In Persona on November 1, 2021, to favorable reviews and marked a turning point in the group's visibility. It would be released on Spotify and Apple Music a month later.

In early 2022 the band announced a new mainline album titled Darklife, again featuring contributions from all three members, which was later released in September to positive reviews. The album was praised for being ambitious and unlike most contemporary electronic music releases. A follow-up album, After Angel, was released in 2023 consisting of material recorded in the same sessions as Darklife, eight songs which were available previously on two EPs, and four new tracks.

== Discography ==
=== NUWRLD Mixtapes (2014) ===
Title	Date	Details	Producers
シェンムーONLINE	January 2, 2014	Label: Self-released	James Webster
ティーンファンタジー：MYSTIC QUEST	February 18, 2014	Label: Self-released	Tech Honors
D.E.S.I.R.E.私が若い頃	March 1, 2014	Label: Self-released	James Webster
RPGウィンドウズ ビスタ	March 15, 2014	Label: Self-released	James Webster
#NUWRLDの気持ち	April 6, 2014	Label: Ailanthus Recordings (AR080)	James Webster
世界大戦OLYMPICS	April 20, 2014	Label: Self-released	Tech Honors
SEAWRLDハートブレーク	June 8, 2014	Label: Self-released	Tech Honors
DERELICTメガタワー	June 20, 2014	Label: Self-released, Dream Catalogue (DREAM_28)	James Webster
失われた時REGRET	August 1, 2014	Label: Self-released; Notes: First collaborative release	James Webster Tech Honors

=== Mainline albums (2014–present) ===
Title	Date	Details	Producers
신세기 EVANGELIS	August 26, 2014	Label: Self-released	James Webster Keith Rankin
VIRTUAL UTOPIA EXPERIENCE	November 8, 2014	Label: Self-released	James Webster
I'll Try Living Like This	May 15, 2015	Label: Dream Catalogue (DREAM_98)	James Webster Keith Rankin
CLASSROOM SEXXTAPE	May 13, 2016	Label: Self-released	Tech Honors
Heavy Black Heart	August 15, 2017	Label: Orange Milk Records	Tech Honors James Webster Keith Rankin
Darklife	September 23, 2022	Label: 100% Electronica (147P)	Tech Honors James Webster Keith Rankin
After Angel	June 30, 2023	Label: Self-released	Tech Honors James Webster Keith Rankin

=== Live albums (2019-present) ===
Title	Date	Details	Performers
Live from Japan	September 6, 2019	Label: Ghost Diamond (GDR010)	James Webster Tech Honors
DarkLIVE 202X	October 15, 2026	Label: 100% Electronica	James Webster Keith Rankin Tech Honors

=== NUWRLD Mixtape Club releases (2020–present) ===
Title	Date	Details	Producers
SEAWRLD 2	November 2, 2020		Tech Honors
さよならTAISAI	December 1, 2020		James Webster
YELLOW FLOWER LOST	January 1, 2021		Tech Honors
ENDLESSメガタワー I	February 1, 2021		James Webster
おはよう ATHLETICS!	March 1, 2021		Tech Honors
Sleepless	April 1, 2021		James Webster
The Masterflan	May 1, 2021	Compilation	Tech Honors James Webster
サンシャインMANIA	June 1, 2021		James Webster
POISONの時代に	July 1, 2021	Also released on vinyl	Tech Honors
ENDLESSメガタワー II	August 1, 2021		James Webster
softwrld	September 1, 2021		Tech Honors
Monument to the Architect	October 1, 2021	Also released on vinyl	James Webster
Faith in Persona	November 1, 2021	Also released on streaming platforms and on vinyl	Keith Rankin
A Quiet Reset	December 1, 2021		Tech Honors
ENDLESSメガタワー III	January 1, 2022		James Webster
RIBBON EP	January 6, 2022	EP	James Webster
Crisis パーティ	February 1, 2022		Tech Honors
Keys to the Gate (Original Version)	March 1, 2022	Also released on streaming platforms and on vinyl	James Webster
Kingdom of One	April 2, 2022		Tech Honors
Transcendence Bot	May 1, 2022	Also released on streaming platforms and on vinyl	Keith Rankin
DREAMガーデン	June 1, 2022		James Webster
Midnight Tangerine	July 7, 2022	Also released on streaming platforms and on vinyl	Tech Honors Keith Rankin
Reality 2 : Archive of Fading Mist (part ii)	August 7, 2022		Keith Rankin
ENDLESSメガタワー IV	September 7, 2022		James Webster
The Lunar Curtain	October 7, 2022	Compilation	Tech Honors James Webster Keith Rankin
MYSTIC QUEST REMAKE	November 23, 2022		Tech Honors
Bio System-J	December 7, 2022	Compilation	Tech Honors James Webster Keith Rankin
MYSTIC SIDEQUEST EP	December 21, 2022	EP	Tech Honors
Together, Our Thing	January 7, 2023	First collaborative release made for the NUWRLD Mixtape Club; Also released on streaming platforms under the Giant Claw alias	Keith Rankin Holly Waxwing
Holy Magic Self	February 7, 2023		James Webster
History of Holy Magic	February 15, 2023	Unedited recordings used to create Holy Magic Self	James Webster
Bright Heart Rotating Into View	March 10, 2023		Tech Honors
Letter to Myself	April 1, 2023		Keith Rankin
GenoMods	April 10, 2023	Also released on vinyl	Keith Rankin
Blue Ocean	May 8, 2023		James Webster
Darklife Anthology	June 30, 2023	Demo recordings for Darklife and After Angel	Tech Honors James Webster Keith Rankin
Rainbow Prison	July 31, 2023		Tech Honors James Webster
No Tomorrow	August 31, 2023		Keith Rankin
CASTLEデザイア	September 25, 2023		James Webster
From a Distance	October 31, 2023		Tech Honors James Webster
FORESTLIMIT BOOTLEG	November 29, 2023	Official live bootleg	Tech Honors James Webster
Reality 2 : Archive of Fading Mist (part i)	December 18, 2023		Keith Rankin
The Cleft	January 8, 2024		James Webster
American Candy	February 8, 2024	Also released on YouTube	Tech Honors
You Like Music	March 15, 2024	Also released on streaming platforms	Keith Rankin Galen Tipton
Angel Ribbon	April 18, 2024		James Webster
Before The Killing Spree	May 28, 2024		Tech Honors
Never Really Over	June 29, 2024		Keith Rankin
Endless VI: Void Complex	July 30, 2024		James Webster
Everything Is Easy!	August 31, 2024		Tech Honors
Flower's Testament	October 26, 2024		James Webster Tamao Ninomiya
Ghosts Beyond The Glass	November 30, 2024		Tech Honors
Dream Is Over	January 2, 2025		Keith Rankin
APPLE GIRL MANIA	January 20, 2025		James Webster
1982-1989: The Complete Recordings of Gary Coin	February 26, 2025		Tech Honors
4k god projected on the smoldering ashes	March 31, 2025		Keith Rankin
The Great Zero	April 30, 2025		James Webster
Women of the Future	June 14, 2025		Tech Honors
Sleep Utility 2025	July 1, 2025		Keith Rankin
Fuchsia Groan	August 1, 2025		James Webster
The Lunar Curtain II	September 12, 2025	Compilation	Tech Honors James Webster Keith Rankin
Still Life+	October 1, 2025		Tech Honors
Ungodly Gaze	October 31, 2025		Keith Rankin
Why I Took Your Advice: A Tribute to Grandaddy	December 6, 2025		James Webster
Foundations: Module 01 - "Crystal"	January 10, 2026		Tech Honors
Mobile Suit Gym Rat	February 13, 2026	Also released on streaming platforms under Giant Claw & galen tipton	Keith Rankin Galen Tipton
Sixth Saint	March 28, 2026		James Webster
Swan Lake National Accounts	April 23, 2026		Tech Honors
Year of the Jaguar	May 29, 2026	Also released on streaming September 25, 2026 under Tech Honors & ELLA MACHINA's duo-group Year of the Jaguar	Tech Honors ELLA MACHINA
WAXEN SCREAM	August 6, 2026		James Webster
Perfect Angel Ribbon	August 26, 2026		James Webster

Soundtracks

Title	Date	Details	Producers
Babel Archives : Imprisoned (original soundtrack)	July 1, 2026	Soundtrack to the film Babel Archives : Imprisoned, a film by Keith Rankin	Keith Rankin

=== Singles ===
- "Judgment Bolt" (2022)
- "Neon Memories" (2022)
- "Messe de E-102" (2022)
- "Fall for Me" (2022)
- "You Are Burning Me Up Like This" (2023)
- "Phantom You, In Four Parts" (2023)
- "The Bleeding of the Sun" (2023)
- "Love Heat" (2023)
- "What? to be human" (2023)
- "Who I Say I Am" (2023)
- "Let Them Live" (2023)
- "Profane Angelic Function" (2023)

=== Remixes ===
Artist	Title	Date	Details
GOLDEN LIVING ROOM	Al'Teau (death's dynamic shroud Remix Special Version)	July 15, 2016	Label: This Ain't Heaven Recording Concern
Nmesh	Hepatic Portal (death's dynamic shroud.wmv's Nuwrld Version)	August 4, 2017	Label: Orange Milk Records
KOROstyle	Selector (death's dynamic shroud Remix)	February 7, 2020	Label: Slit Jockey Records
Equip	Nocturne Catacombs (death's dynamic shroud Remix)	May 26, 2020	Label: 100% Electronica
R23X	Project Veltahl (Dds Remix)	October 23, 2020	Label: Yetee Records
Neggy Gemmy	California (death's dynamic shroud Remix)	March 2, 2022	Label: 100% Electronica
Small Black	Postcard (death's dynamic shroud Remix)	May 31, 2022	Label: Self-released
Vitesse X	Potential Energy (death's dynamic shroud Remix)	December 2, 2022	Label: 100% Electronica
WTRGRL	Scream (death's dynamic shroud Remix)	June 30, 2023	Label: Self-released
