= Babaganouj (band) =

Australian indie rock band

Babaganoüj
- Origin: Brisbane, Queensland, Australia
- Genres: Indie rock
- Years active: 2011–2023
- Past members: Charles Sale; Harriette Pilbeam; Ruby McGregor; George Browning; Peter McDowell; Jack Gleeson

Babaganoüj were an Australian indie rock band formed in 2011 in Brisbane by Charles Sale (guitar, vocals), Harriette Pilbeam (bass guitar, vocals), and Peter McDowell (drums). In 2011, after the dissolution of Sale's former band Yves Klein Blue the year prior, he released an EP of demos under the moniker of Babaganouj; Pilbeam and McDowell joined shortly thereafter.

In 2012, Jack Glesson joined the band as the new drummer, replacing McDowell. Following the release of their debut EP, Sife Lucks (2013), Ruby McGregor joined as the fourth member as the rhythm guitarist. Gleeson left the band in early 2016, and was replaced by Ritchie Daniell (the drummer from The Grates) on tour during 2016. Later that year, George Browning joined as the band's new official drummer. The band released various standalone singles during 2012–2015 before releasing a trilogy of EPs: Pillar of Light (2016), Hard to Be (2016) and Clarity Restored (2017).

On 12 September 2018, the band announced on their Facebook page that McDowell had died. In 2023, following a lengthy period of inactivity due to Pillbeam's newfound solo success as Hatchie, the band released their debut album Jumbo Pets. The band played several shows that year, without Pilbeam, before splitting up due to McGregor relocating to the UK.

== Members ==
Final line-up

- Charles Sale – lead vocals, lead guitar (2011–2023)
- Harriette Pillbeam – bass guitar, backing and lead vocals (2011–2023)
- Ruby McGregor – rhythm guitar, backing vocals (2013–2023)
- George Browning – drums (2017–2023)

Former members

- Peter McDowell – drums (2011–2012; died 2018)
- Jack Gleeson – drums (2012–2015)
- Ritchie Daniell – drums (2016; touring)

== Discography ==
Releases adapted from the band's Bandcamp and Spotify pages.

=== Albums ===
List of albums, with selected details
Title	Details
Jumbo Pets	Released: 31 March 2023; Format: CD, LP, digital; Label: Coolin' By Sound (CBS013)

=== Extended plays ===
List of EPs, with selected details
Title	Details
Sife Lucks	Released: March 2013; Format: CD; Label: Babaganoüj (BABA01)
Too Late for Love	Released: 2014; Format: 7" LP; Label: Babaganoüj (BABA02)
Pillar of Light	Released: 2016; Format: CD, mini LP; Label: 2670records (TSSO-1016)
Hard to Be	Released: 2016; Format: CD; Label: 2670records (TSSO-1019)
Clarity Restored	Released: 2017; Format: CD; Label: 2670records (TSSO-1022)
