= George Clanton & Nick Hexum =

Studio album by George Clanton & Nick Hexum
- Released: July 23, 2020
- Length: 34:14
- Label: 100% Electronica

George Clanton chronology
Slide (2018)	George Clanton & Nick Hexum (2020)	Ooh Rap I Ya (2023)

Singles from George Clanton & Nick Hexum
- 1. "Crash Pad / King For A Day"; 2. "Under Your Window"; 3. "Out of the Blue"; 4. "Aurora Summer"; 5. "Topanga State of Mind"

George Clanton & Nick Hexum (Deluxe)
- Cover art for the deluxe edition.

George Clanton & Nick Hexum is the first collaborative album between American electronic musician George Clanton and 311 lead vocalist Nick Hexum, released on July 23, 2020, by Clanton's label 100% Electronica.

== Background and production ==
During interviews for his 2018 album Slide, Clanton stated one of his biggest inspirations for the album was the band 311. His first live concert was a 311 concert in 2003, explaining that they "blew [him] away" by playing some of his favourite deep cuts. Clanton finally met Hexum at a 311 concert during the summer of 2018, with Hexum first hearing of Clanton through 311's band assistant Evan Anderson. Anderson told Hexum a guy who "makes really cool music" would be coming to that concert, and proceeded to play him some of Clanton's songs; Hexum met with Clanton after the show, and told him to let him know if he ever wanted someone to play guitar for his music.

The album was mostly done over email, with the duo not meeting again until an interview with The Fader in September 2019 to debut their first collaborative singles, "Crash Pad" and "King For A Day". According to Clanton, Hexum would typically just send .mp3 files without a caption, waiting for Clanton to respond back with an instrumental, with Hexum then recording a polished take in his studio. The duo stated at the time they had already made six songs this way, and were planning to make more. On November 22, the duo released "Under Your Window" as a single, followed by "Out of the Blue" on December 10. At Clanton's 100% ElectriCON 2 festival the following year, he announced that their eponymous debut album would be releasing on the July 23rd that same year. That same day, Clanton put out a formal press release alongside another single, "Aurora Summer"; Clanton joked in the release that the album was a "collab no one asked for or predicted", but also called the album "a dream come true". On June 26, the duo released a sixth and final single for the album, "Topanga State of Mind".

On September 16, 2022, a deluxe edition of the album was released on Clanton's Bandcamp and streaming services, featuring instrumentals, live performances of the songs, demos and a remix under Clanton's alias ESPRIT 空想.

== Reception ==
Professional ratings
Review scores
Source	Rating
Black Squirrel Radio	4/5
Pitchfork	7.3

Pitchfork's Marty Sartini Garner called the album "custom-built to showcase the things that Hexum has always done well", while calling Clanton's production dialled back in scope without "losing any of the emotional charge". Richard Wiggins of God Is in the TV complained that much of the record "[floated] around without ever going for the jugular", particularly lamenting Hexum's rapping on "Crash Pad", although he gave a strong recommendation to check out the album's singles. Cyrus Adkins of Black Squirrel Radio had a similar complaint about rapping on "Crash Pad", otherwise stating that their first listen made them feel an "immense amount of bliss", and called the album "pure happiness split up into 9 tracks". Mixdown Magazine placed the album on their list of new releases to listen to the week of release, calling it an "odd collaboration" that makes for "an incredibly intriguing chill-out album".

== Track listing ==
All tracks are written by George Clanton and Nick Hexum.

George Clanton & Nick Hexum
No.	Title	Length
1.	"Aurora Summer"	3:41
2.	"Out of the Blue"	4:13
3.	"Under Your Window"	3:37
4.	"Driving in My Car"	3:37
5.	"Topanga State of Mind"	2:52
6.	"Crash Pad"	4:19
7.	"King for a Day"	4:04
8.	"Time of Wandering" (Prelude)	0:30
9.	"Time of Wandering"	3:49
10.	"Shouldnta Done That"	3:39
Total length:		34:14

George Clanton & Nick Hexum (Deluxe)
No.	Title	Length
11.	"Aurora Summer" (Instrumental)	3:41
12.	"Out of the Blue" (Instrumental)	4:13
13.	"Under Your Window" (Instrumental)	3:37
14.	"Driving in My Car" (Instrumental)	3:37
15.	"Topanga State of Mind" (Instrumental)	2:52
16.	"Crash Pad" (Instrumental)	4:19
17.	"King for a Day" (Instrumental)	4:04
18.	"Time of Wandering" (Instrumental)	3:50
19.	"Shouldnta Done That" (Instrumental)	3:49
20.	"Aurora Summer" (Live on FishCenter)	4:12
21.	"Crash Pad" (Live on FishCenter)	4:33
22.	"Under Your Window" (Demo)	3:24
23.	"Topanga State of Mind" (Demo)	2:49
24.	"Aurora Summer" (Writing Session)	1:42
25.	"George & Nick" (Guitar Arpeggio Jam)	3:12
26.	"Aurora Summer" (ESPRIT 空想 Remix)	7:51
Total length:		1:35:48

== Notes ==
1. On the Bandcamp release of the album, Time of Wandering (Prelude) and Time of Wandering are combined as track 8, reducing the track total to 9. The combined track is identical in content and length.
