= Dark Web (album) =

Studio album by Giant Claw
- Released: September 24, 2014
- Genre: Plunderphonics; trap; vaporwave; footwork
- Length: 41:10
- Label: Orange Milk Records; Noumenal Loom; Virgin Babylon
- Producer: Giant Claw

Giant Claw chronology
Max Mutant (2013)	Dark Web (2014)	22M Never Felt So Alone (2014)

Singles from Dark Web
- 1. "Dark Web 002" Released: August 13, 2014; 2. "Dark Web 005" Released: September 12, 2014

Dark Web is a studio album by American producer Keith Rankin, known by his stage name Giant Claw, released in September 2014 worldwide by the labels Orange Milk Records, Noumenal Loom, and in Japan by Virgin Babylon. Dark Web depicts the idea of existing cultures and music coming together to form, in the words of Orange Milk, "new compositional tools." As such, its melodies are executed from a combination of half-second-length snippets of vocal samples from pop and R&B songs. Dark Web follows Giant Claw's typical style of samples and MIDI compositions but with more influences of modern music than Rankin's previous records. Dark Web garnered a favorable critical response for its odd tone and landed in the year-end lists of publications such as Tiny Mix Tapes and CMJ.

== Composition and concept ==
"When you really start to dissect samples — when you don’t just let a minute sample play — a different kind of compositional style emerges, as if you’re using that layer of culture itself as an instrument. That idea was cool to me. Also, mixing that with original compositional fragments that I did… I’d record something at night, like a melody on a keyboard, and I’d have it mixed in with these samples, and when I’d listen back, I’d ask myself, “was this thing I played a sample? Which was which?” The fact that I was confusing myself was interesting, too."

— Rankin on Dark Web's production style

As with other works by Giant Claw, Dark Web employs a mixture of samples and originally-composed, complex MIDI riffs. The album follows a concept about hyperrealism, the idea of parts of existing cultures and records being used to combine together "new compositional tools," as the press release by Orange Milk Records puts it. The album is meant to portray "late night browsing sessions gone wrong, when YouTube clips and SoundCloud links and iTunes tracks melt together in an amalgam of cultural signposts and musical signifiers," stated Fact magazine. Dark Web is based on the idea of humans unknowingly becoming parts of bigger trends than their actual "individual instincts." As Dummy magazine analyzed, "It’s hard to tell what’s authentic and what’s appropriated on 'Dark Web': it’s both strikingly unique, yet made of familiar sounds."

Rankin produced Dark Web based on three factors, what he described as the "layers of reality." The first layer was the primary compositional elements, "things people are used to picking up on instantly," including rhythm, melody, harmonic structure, and timbre. The second factor is the signals of the culture or time period affiliation of the samples. The album's vocals are sampled from 1990s R&B and pop, and, as Rankin stated, the time of the source material is indicated by the "extra-musical layer" of the "tiny affectations in the original vocals." How he edited and processed the samples is the third layer, and he intended to make this the clearest one to the listener: "my creative intention was to make the listener subconsciously realize that the historical sample was being manipulated, that the culture is being used as a new compositional tool." For every track, Rankin first gathered the vocal stems for Dark Web before cutting less than half of a second from all of them to combine and perform original riffs. He added, "The takeaway from that is that the sample doesn’t matter, whether you’re sampling or composing something yourself. The end result is the significant statement. I think that goes against a lot of reactions to sampling itself that I’ve seen in the past few years: “it’s not music, it’s not original because it’s been sampled,” and so on."

Nick James Scavo of Tiny Mix Tapes analyzed that Dark Web, uses "common-denominator images and sounds: romanesque statue, 808 kick-and-snare, stock-MIDI hoopla, R&B voice samples, etc. to compartmentalize the aesthetic eclecticism of 2014 into digestible, cellular tracks soaked in empathy." Dark Web employed more musical influences, more specifically of music that was popular on services like SoundCloud when Rankin recorded the album, than Giant Claw's previous records. For example, the album uses several trap hi-hats, a sound he heard on several SoundCloud tracks. He described obtaining popular musical elements that weren't a part of his normal style as "freeing:" "When you’re trying to imitate a sound or play into a cultural style, it can loosen you up and make you go to new places that apart from your influences." Dummy compared Dark Web to the Oneohtrix Point Never album R Plus Seven (2013), in that the album has "a hundred miniature [sample] movements within it, each presented in a linear fashion." As journalist Lizzie Plaugic analyzed, the album has an "atmosphere of horny apocalyptic nihilism" that derives from its mixture of "effortless sensuality and battery-charged electronics." Scavo also compared the LP to R Plus Seven but wrote that while R Plus Seven "was a formal deconstruction, Giant Claw’s approach is perhaps more confrontational in its pace, its insanity, its sheer relentlessness in giving in to far-out impulses and emotional indulgence." Writer Samuel Diamond stated the samples vary in quality to disabuse "imposed distinctions between “high” and “low” art."

== Reception ==
Professional ratings
Review scores
Source	Rating
Exclaim!	9/10
Tiny Mix Tapes	4.5/5 marks

As NPR Music described the charm of Dark Web, "If you try to follow Rankin's skewed beat logic, you might get lost, and yet it's oddly comforting." Stereogum writer Chris DeVille opined the album works because it "welcomes you into its oddity." He elaborated, "Even as it refuses to settle into a steady groove, its freakish flights of fancy never come across as antisocial." In writing about the track "Dark Web 005" for Noisey, Drew Millard opined, "this song is difficult, but this song is also great. It's not like some crazy sonic puzzle or anything, but it's definitely one of those songs you have to listen to a few times intently and think about it for a few minutes before you "get" it." Exclaim! called the LP the most "interesting" in Rankin's discography, reasoning that its "rife with incongruence, yet somehow it works so very well." Dummy magazine claimed that "there’ll still be plenty to come back to on Dark Web over the next few months," praising the album's "playful" sample editing and "legitimately emotive harmonic expression." Tiny Mix Tapes placed Giant Claw at number seven on its list of 2014's best release, while on a year-end list by CMJ it ranked 27. On the list, writer Lizzie Plaugic honored it as "a whole new thing, and for my money, it’s something 2015 will have to get used to."

== Track listing ==
Derived from the official Orange Milk Records Bandcamp page.

No.	Title	Length
1.	"DARK WEB 001"	4:12
2.	"DARK WEB 002"	4:14
3.	"DARK WEB 003"	5:00
4.	"DARK WEB 004"	3:13
5.	"DARK WEB 005"	5:17
6.	"DARK WEB 006"	5:38
7.	"DARK WEB 007"	5:37
8.	"DARK WEB 008"	7:59
Total length:		41:10

== Personnel ==
Derived from the liner notes of Dark Web.

- Composed and produced by Keith Rankin
- Mixed by Andrew Humphrey
- Visual art on the artwork by Rankin and Ellen Thomas
- Mastering and 3D image on artwork by YouTube hacking James Webster

== Release history ==
Region	Date	Format(s)	Label
Worldwide	September 24, 2014	Streaming	Stereogum
Worldwide	September 26, 2014	Digital download	Noumenal Loom
Worldwide	September 30, 2014	CD; vinyl	Orange Milk
Japan	October 25, 2014	Digital download	Virgin Babylon
Japan	December 7, 2014	CD	Virgin Babylon
Worldwide	February 13, 2015	Cassette	Orange Milk
