= Software (band) =

German electric pop duo

Software was a German electronic duo active from 1984 to 1999, originally composed of Michael Weisser and Peter Mergener. The duo formerly used the name Mergener & Weisser interchangeably with Software.

== History ==
The group released their records under the IC (Innovative Communication) label, which also released a number of other electronic musicians, including Klaus Schulze and the Neue Deutsche Welle group Ideal.

The group's sound can be divided into four eras: A spacey, Berlin School-inspired sound from 1984-1986, a more energetic, digital sound from 1987-1990, a more varied range of styles between later 1990 and 1993, and finally, a more gothic, choral-inflected sound between 1995 and 1998.

In March 1987, the compilation set Past-Present-Future, Parts I and II, released, containing a combined six new tracks.

The original February 1988 release Dea Alba was at first only available on cassette (until 2017). This material was largely reworked (alongside material from Software-Visions as well as brand new tracks) for the album Ocean in 1990.

During a brief hiatus from 1990 to 1993, Weisser produced four albums using the Software name with a different group composition: Fragrance with Klaus Schulze and Georg Stettner, and Modesty-Blaze I & II and Cave with Billy Byte (Stephan Töteberg). Although Mergener was not active in the band during that time, he still reworked many older tracks for the release of Space Design - The Remix, which released shortly before Cave. He later returned to the band full-time, and the duo released three more albums between 1995 and 1998.

After the dissolution of Software in 1999, the two musicians went their separate ways: Peter Mergener continues to compose and play electronic music, while Michael Weisser first founded the group G.E.N.E. (Grooving Electronic Natural Environments) and is currently, among other things, active as a media artist.

The project released new compilations in 2007 and 2008. In September 2017, Weisser released six more, themed compilation albums under the Software name. Earlier that same year, Vaporwave artist George Clanton re-released the band's 1988 album Digital-Dance on his 100% Electronica label. Today, Software's discography is available on the website Bandcamp.

== Members ==
- Michael Weisser – (1984–1999, 2007, 2017)
- Peter Mergener – (1984–1990, 1992–1999)
- Billy Byte – (1990–1993)
- Klaus Schulze – (1990–1992)
- Georg Stettner – (1990–1992)

== Discography ==
An * after the release year denotes this was originally released under the name Peter Mergener & Michael Weisser.

Albums

- Beam-Scape (1984) *
- Chip-Meditation I (1985)
- Phancyful-Fire (1985) *
- Electronic-Universe I (1985)
- Night-Light (1986) *
- Syn-Code (1987)
- Dea Alba (1988)
- Digital-Dance (1988)
- Software-Visions (1988) *
- Electronic-Universe II (1988)
- Chip-Meditation II (Recorded 1985, released 1989)
- The-Third-Dimension-LIVE-In-Concert (1989)
- Ocean (1990)
- Fragrance (1990)
- Modesty-Blaze I (1991)
- Modesty-Blaze II (1992)
- Space Design - The Remix (1993)
- Cave (1993)
- Heaven-to-Hell (1995)
- Sky-Dive (1997)
- Fire-Works (1998)

Compilations

- Past-Present-Future I (1987) [Includes 3 new tracks]
- Past-Present-Future II (1987) [Includes 3 new tracks]
- Ten Years (1994)
- Brain-Food-Music (1994)
- Spring Visions (2007)
- Sunstorm (2008)
- Electronic World (2017)
- Ocean World (2017)
- Sacral World (2017)
- Erotic World (2017)
- Space World (2017)
- Dea Alba World (2017)
