= Cowgirl Clue =

American musician and producer

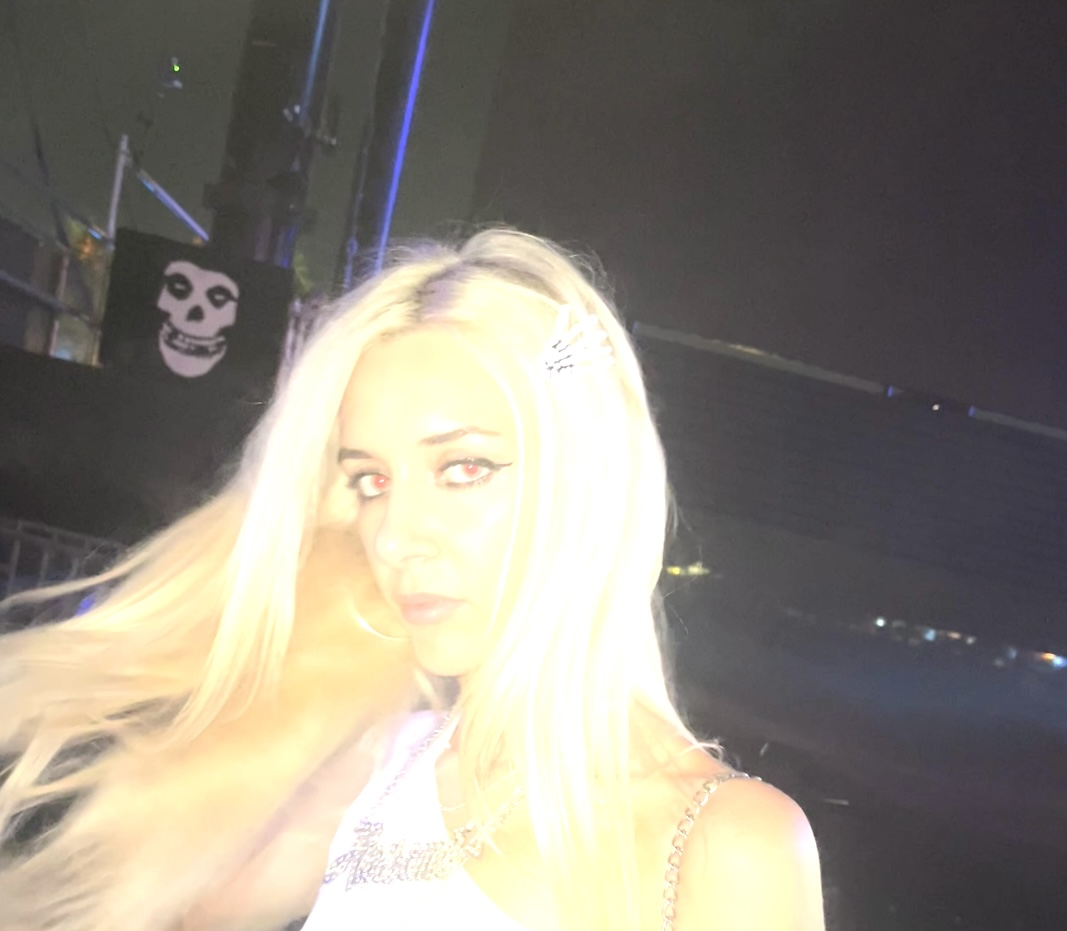
- Cowgirl Clue at Coachella in 2025

Background information
- Origin: Austin, Texas, U.S.
- Genres: Electronic; electroclash; indie; witch house; electropop
- Label: self-released
- Website: https://www.cowgirlclue.com

Cowgirl Clue is an American artist, songwriter, and record producer based in Los Angeles County, California. She is known for blending elements of electronic music with influences from indie, techno, witch house, and at times country. The artist released her debut album Icebreaker in 2019, followed by numerous singles including “Trailblaze ☆”, and “Picket Fence” in 2023. She has since released two full length albums, Rodeo Star (2023), and Total Freedom (2025). Cowgirl Clue is associated with a distinct visual aesthetic and immersive sound that is known within underground music circles.”

== Career ==
She is originally from Austin, Texas. Clue has been producing since 2015. Having originally DJed within her local scene before she began professionally producing, she'd decided to release her first song "Cherry Jubilee" and later an extended play, Limelite. In 2016, she released her first single Cherry Jubilee to mass support leading a release of string single releases. By 2019, she'd changed her alias and released her first album Icebreaker.

In 2023, Clue released her second album Rodeo Star, which featured 13 songs exploring witch house, electroclash, and indie music. Her visual representation was strongly defined for this album leading with a music video for the first single, Trailblaze ☆. She later released an official music video for Picket Fence and an entire collection of visualizers for each track in which she premiered on the Cowgirl Clue youtube channel. In support of her record, She toured across the United States with support from underground artists including Haunted Mound member Elusin, electronic duo Kumo99, and Arizona shoegaze band Glixen. She has modelled for three different Rock Revival Jeans campaigns during this time and one of the video campaigns also featured Chandler Lucy, member of The Hellp.

In 2025, she released Total Freedom, an exploratory album of new age indie music and underground electronic dance music. In an interview with Metal Magazine, Cowgirl Clue described the record as “an explosion of sounds” that is “psychedelic at times but consistently indie electronic,” adding that it represents a more “refined” and “stronger” release compared to her earlier work. Cowgirl Clue self-released the first single "Hearts That Run" in July 16th, 2025. She soon after released the first music video for the album, and second single titled "Cruise Control" on August 21, 2025 directed by Ashley Calhoun and Jaxon Whittington. Her most recent and third single, "Left Unsaid" was released with a video on September 12, 2025. The album was self-released a week later on September 25th, 2025. Cowgirl Clue coined the term "candy-coated witchhouse" when she described songs like "Ballet Flat$ on The Ga$ Pedal" on this album.

== Discography ==
=== Studio albums ===
Title	Album details
Icebreaker	Released: May 4, 2019; Label: Self-released / Vada Vada; Format: Cassette Tape, digital download, streaming
Rodeo Star	Released: August 3, 2023; Label: Self-released / Vada Vada; Format: LP, CD, digital download, streaming
Total Freedom	Released: September 25, 2025; Label: Self Released; Format: LP, CD, digital download, streaming

=== EPs ===
Title	EP details
Limelite	Released: April 16, 2016; Label: Vada Vada; Format: Cassette, Digital download, streaming (Note: No longer available on streaming services.)

=== Remix EPs ===
Title	EP details
Icebreaker Remixes	Released: August 20, 2020; Label: Self-Released; Format: Digital download, streaming

=== Singles ===
Singles
Title	Release date	Release group type
“Cherry Jubilee”	2015	Single
“Metamorphosis”	2015	Single
“Jewel”	2017	Single
“Confessions of a Genie”	2017	Single
“Utopia”	2017	Single
“Taxi Taxi”	2018	Single
“Teacup”	2021	Single
“Trailblaze ☆”	2022	Single
“Picket Fence”	2023	Single
“Hearts That Run”	2025	Single
“Cruise Control”	2025	Single
“Left Unsaid”	2025	Single

=== Music videos ===
- "Cherry Jubilee" (2015)
- "Teacup" (2021)
- "Trailblaze ☆" (2022)
- "Picket Fence" (2023)
- "Hometown Hero" - Visualizer (2023)
- "$somethin's in the Air" - Visualizer (2023)
- "Trust Fall" - Visualizer (2023)
- "Fairy Tales" - Visualizer (2023)
- "Tangles in My Hair" - Visualizer (2023)
- "Cursive in Concrete" - Visualizer (2023)
- "Tangles in My Hair" - Visualizer (2023)
- "Rodeo Star" - Visualizer (2023)
- "Running With A Flashlight" - Visualizer (2023)
- "Down By The Lake" - Visualizer (2023)
- "Gold Switchblade" - Visualizer (2023)
- "Wild Fires" - Visualizer (2023)
- "Cruise Control" (2025)
- "Left Unsaid" (2025)
- "Total Freedom" - Visualizer (2025)
- "Ballet Flat$ On The Ga$ Pedal" (2026)
