= Giant Claw =

American electronic musician

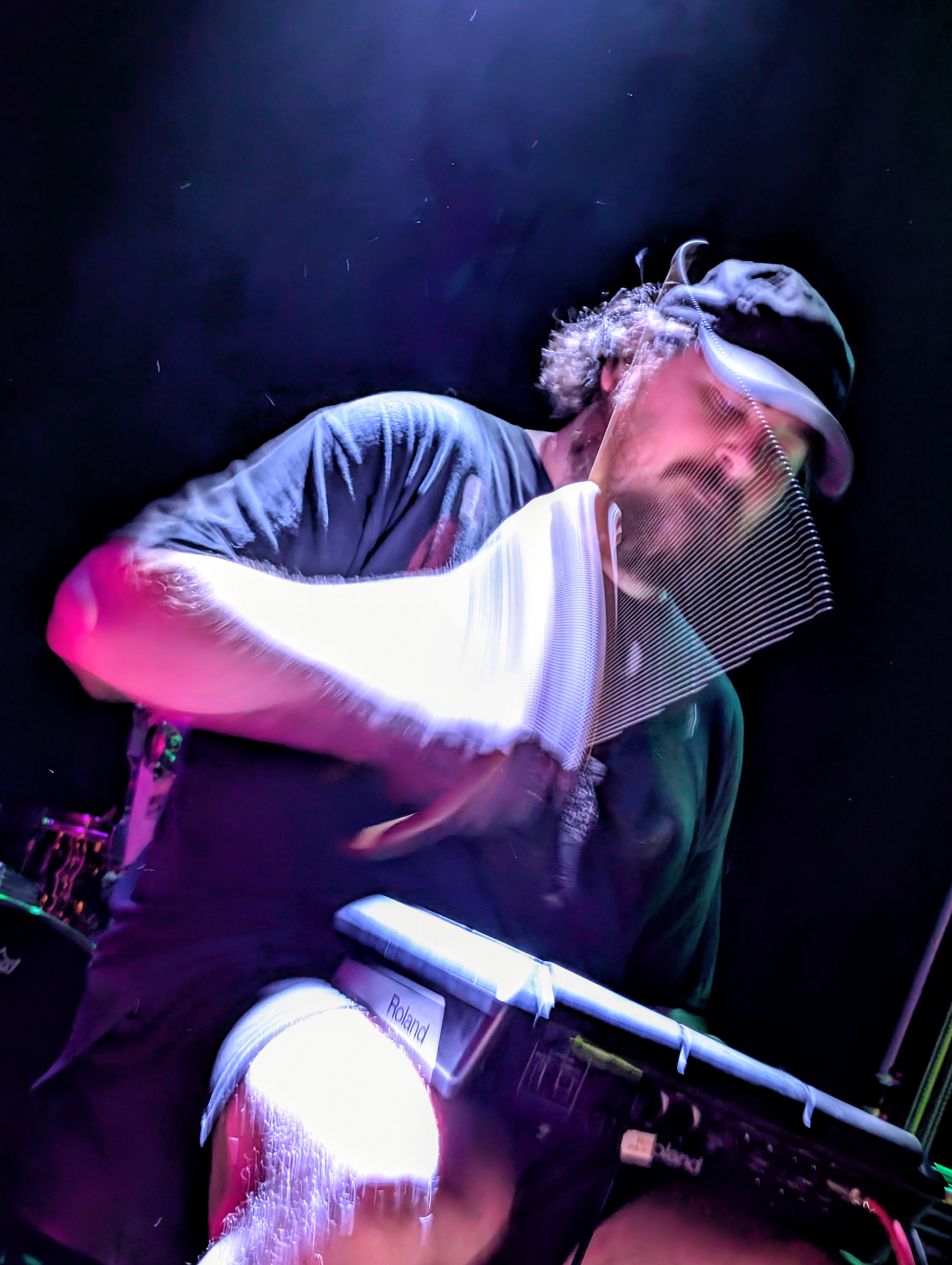

Background information
- Born: Keith Rankin; United States
- Origin: Columbus, Ohio
- Genres: Electronic, vaporwave, footwork, psychedelia
- Occupations: Musician, record producer, visual artist
- Years active: 2010–present
- Labels: Orange Milk Records; Ghost Diamond
- Website: www.keithrankinart.com

Keith Rankin is an American electronic musician and visual artist who records under the alias Giant Claw, a largely vaporwave and psychedelic music project. He is known for the vaporwave project Death's Dynamic Shroud, which he joined in 2014.

AllMusic biographer Paul Simpson describes Rankin's music as Giant Claw as ranging "from dense sound collages and synth freak-outs to mutated prog rock and psychedelia to footwork and vaporwave".

Rankin has also made several album artworks, such as Kenny Beats and Rico Nasty's Anger Management and Kerwin Frost's Apple Music radio show.

== History ==
In 2010, the year Giant Claw debuted, Rankin launched the label Orange Milk with his friend Seth Graham, aiming to release records by underground American musicians. The artwork for all the label's releases have been designed by Rankin himself. Fact Magazine have ranked the label as one of the 10 best of both 2013 and 2016.

== Reception ==
The 2014 album Dark Web was praised by Stereogum for its deconstructed sound collage style, combining dub music and beat-driven styles. Other works have similarly been praised.

In 2021, Rankin released his first solo mixtape for 'Death's Dynamic Shroud' called, 'Faith In Persona'. Upon release, it was critically acclaimed by Anthony Fantano who praised his production.

== Selected discography ==
- Midnight Murder (2011)
- Tunnel Mind (2011)
- Clash of Moons (2012)
- Mutant Glamour (2012)
- Music for Film (2013)
- Dark Web (2014)
- Deep Thoughts (2015)
- I'll Try Living Like This (with Death's Dynamic Shroud's member, James Webster) (2015)
- Soft Channel (2017)
- Heavy Black Heart (with Death's Dynamic Shroud) (2017)
- Mirror Guide (2021)
- Faith In Persona (under Death's Dynamic Shroud) (2021)
- Reality 2 : Archive of Fading Mist (part ii) (under Death's Dynamic Shroud) (2022)
- Darklife (with Death's Dynamic Shroud) (2022)
- Together, Our Thing (under Death's Dynamic Shroud, with Holly Waxwing) (2023)
- GenoMods (under Death's Dynamic Shroud) (2023)
- No Tomorrow (under Death's Dynamic Shroud) (2023)
- Transcendence Bot (under Death's Dynamic Shroud) (2023)
- Reality 2 : Archive of Fading Mist (part i) (under Death's Dynamic Shroud) (2023)
- You Like Music (under Death's Dynamic Shroud, with Galen Tipton) (2024)
- Never Really Over (under Death's Dynamic Shroud) (2024)
- Decadent Stress Chamber (2025)
- Mobile Suit Gym Rat (with Galen Tipton) (2026)
