= Sophia Stel =

Canadian musical artist (born 1998)

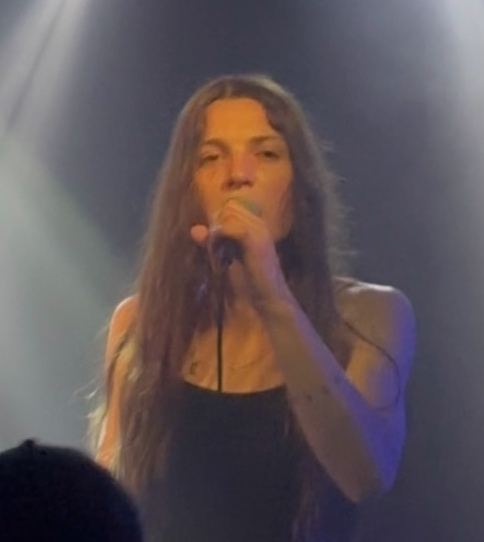
- Stel performing at DC9 in 2026
- Born: 1998 (age 27–28); Saanich, British Columbia, Canada
- Musical career
- Origin: Vancouver, British Columbia, Canada
- Genres: Alternative pop, indie rock, hyperpop
- Labels: Pack Records; A24 Music
- Website: www.sophiastel.net

Sophia Johanna Stel (born 1998) is a Canadian singer-songwriter, producer, and model.

== Life and career ==
Stel is from Saanich, British Columbia and grew up in a large religious family; she is the third of 11 children. She has worked as a gardener, a house painter, and a bartender. She is an avid skateboarder. Stel is lesbian and currently in a relationship.

In 2024, Stel released her first EP, Object Permanence. She opened for A. G. Cook in the fall of 2024.

In 2025, Stel was included on NME's list of 100 Essential Emerging Artists for 2025. She released her second EP, How to Win at Solitaire on September 5, 2025.

Stel made her runway debut at the SS26 Ann Demeulemeester show during Paris Fashion Week in 2026.

Stel opened for Lorde on the Ultrasound World Tour on May 14 and 15, 2026.

Stel released her album The Greatest Album of All Time on October 16, 2026. She announced a tour across Europe and North America for the album.

== Artistry ==
Stel's music has been described as a blend of trip-hop and hyperpop. She lists Sufjan Stevens, Cash Cobain, A. G. Cook, Young Thug, and John Beltran as influences on her music.

== Discography ==
=== Albums ===
List of studio albums, with selected details
Title	Album details
The Greatest Album of All Time	Released: October 16, 2026; Label: A24 Music; Format: LP, CD, digital download, streaming

=== Extended plays ===
List of extended plays, with selected details
Title	EP details
Object Permanence	Released: September 13, 2024; Label: Pack Records; Format: LP, digital download, streaming
How to Win at Solitaire	Released: September 5, 2025; Label: Pack Records, Create Music Group; Format: LP, digital download, streaming

== Charted singles ==
Title	Year	Peak chart position	Album
Title	Year	HND Ang Air.	Album
"Now I've Got a Lot You Know"	2026	7	The Greatest Album of All Time
