= Joe Agius =

- Born: Joseph James Agius; 10 March 1992 (age 34); Kingscliff, New South Wales, Australia
- Origin: Brisbane, Australia
- Genres: Indie Rock; Dream Pop; Shoegaze
- Occupation: Musician
- Instruments: Vocals; guitar; keyboards; piano
- Years active: 2013–present
- Member of: The Creases; RINSE
- Spouse: Hatchie (m. 2021)

Joseph James Agius (born 10 March 1992) is an Australian musician, singer and performer. He is the lead singer & guitarist of Brisbane-based rock band The Creases, which he founded in 2013, and solo project RINSE, which he began officially releasing music through in 2020. Agius has also directed music videos for his wife Harriette Pilbeam's solo project, Hatchie. As a member of Hatchie's backing band, Agius has also co-written, co-produced and performed material with her since 2018.

== Biography ==
Agius moved to Brisbane in 2013, where he formed rock group The Creases. He provided lead vocals and guitar for the group alongside Jarod Mahon on bass guitar and vocals before they were joined by Aimon Clark on lead guitar and Gabriel Webster on drums. They released their debut album, Tremolow (July 2017), which reached the ARIA Top 100 Physical Albums and No. 21 on the ARIA Hitseekers Albums charts.

== Personal life ==
Agius married his long time partner Harriette Pilbeam (AKA Hatchie) on 24 November 2021. The wedding ceremony was held at Graceland Wedding Chapel in Las Vegas, Nevada.

== Awards and nominations ==
=== Queensland Music Awards ===
The Queensland Music Awards (previously known as Q Song Awards) are annual awards celebrating Queensland, Australia's brightest emerging artists and established legends. They commenced in 2006.

| Year | Nominee / work | Award | Result (wins only) |
|---|---|---|---|
| 2016 | himself | The BOQ People's Choice Award Most Promising Male Songwriter | Won |
