= Slide (George Clanton album) =

Studio album by George Clanton
- Released: August 17, 2018
- Genres: Vaporwave; chillwave; synth-pop; hypnagogic pop; trip hop; baggy
- Length: 39:38
- Label: 100% Electronica
- Producer: George Clanton

George Clanton chronology
100% Electronica (2015)	Slide (2018)	George Clanton & Nick Hexum (2020)

Slide is the second studio album by American electronic musician George Clanton, released on August 17, 2018 by his independent record label 100% Electronica.

== Background and music ==
After releasing his debut album 100% Electronica, George Clanton tried to produce a sequel to it for three years but found it difficult because he wasn't able to find the sound he wanted for it. After giving up, he started experimenting and writing stuff for fun and felt that the "songs [were writing] themselves". This material became the basis for Slide. Clanton said that Slide was the first album he wrote under his own name, since his debut album was written as a Mirror Kisses record before he decided to release it under his real name.

Clanton said that in Slide he did not try to be "ironic" or "silly with his lyrics", and preferred to "write great pop songs that are representative of an emotion that [he] actually [feels] when [he's] singing them." He has said that a lot of Slide was written "freestyle" and that the lyrics of it are "really vague and come from deep down sometimes from a subconscious place." The album features electric guitars, acoustic drums, samples and synthesizers. Clanton described Slide as "a vaporwave opera".

Clanton premiered Slide on August 18, 2018 in front of a sold out audience at the Elsewhere music venue in Brooklyn, New York City. He also gave a free performance of the album at the Nasher Sculpture Center alongside Chulita Vinyl Club on November 16, 2018.

== Reception ==
Professional ratings
Review scores
Source	Rating
The Needle Drop	7/10
Pitchfork	7.3/10
The Sunflower	Certified Sunny

Slide received generally favorable reviews from music critics. PopGun Presents described the album as "a glossy, cathartic fusion of electronic pop, trip-hop, and, of course, vaporwave" and wrote that "the project earned [Clanton] a new level of well deserved notoriety both within and outside of the vaporwave subculture he came up in." Miles Bowe of Pitchfork wrote that in Slide "the electronic musician formerly known as Mirror Kisses has grown into his most fully realized vision of pop yet" and that "Clanton is exactly the kind of artist chillwave could have used a decade ago. [...] Like Ariel Pink before him, Clanton throws himself into his music without any self-conscious concern for cool—and throws himself about in breathtakingly physical live shows that bring to mind a young John Maus." John Darr of The Sunflower wrote, "While the epic beauty of 100% Electronica is very much intact here, Slide boasts a greater range of arrangements, production choices, and song structures" and that it "is the work of an artist improving on all fronts. It’s certainly proof that a musician can look backwards for aesthetic inspiration to move relentlessly into the future." Study Breaks' Jonathan Christian wrote, "Clanton’s off-brand vaporwave pop is some of the most dreamlike music you’ll hear on this side of the known universe" and "[it's] difficult to define exactly what makes Slide one of my favorite albums of 2018, but it's an indescribably resonant experience I believe everyone should take part in." Sarah Gooding wrote for i-D that "Sincerity is Slide's defining characteristic".

Anthony Fantano of The Needle Drop praised Slide's sound-craft, describing it as "excellent, beautiful, dense, lush, psychedelic, overwhelming, and orgasmic", and compared its explosive passion and sonic density with that of New Radicals' and My Bloody Valentine's, respectively. Fantano criticized the singing and the lyrics in the album, describing the latter as "an emotional placeholder just to kind of fill space." Clanton disagreed with Fantano on album's lyrics, feeling they are "strong" and describing himself as "extremely proud" with them. Fantano later went on to place Slide at #197 on his list of the top 200 albums of the 2010s.

== Track listing ==
All music is composed by George Clanton.

No.	Title	Length
1.	"Livin' Loose"	5:49
2.	"Make It Forever"	3:32
3.	"Tie Me Down"	3:10
4.	"Dumb"	3:21
5.	"Blast Off"	2:20
6.	"Slide"	6:29
7.	"Monster"	3:47
8.	"You Lost Me There"	6:03
9.	"Encore"	1:53
10.	"Walk Slowly"	3:09
