= Geneviève Ryan-Martel =

Canadian trance DJ and producer

TDJ
- Also known as: Ryan Playground
- Born: Geneviève Ryan-Martel
- Origin: Montreal, Quebec, Canada
- Genre: Trance
- Occupations: DJ; Record producer
- Years active: 2015–present
- Website: spfinfini.com

Geneviève Ryan-Martel, known professionally as TDJ, is a Canadian DJ and trance producer based in Montreal.

== Career ==
In 2015, she released her first material under the name Ryan Playground. She started the TDJ project in 2019. In 2023 she was featured in Pitchfork's article on the return of trance. In 2025 she released her self-titled debut album and was a guest on the A State of Trance podcast. She received the Electronic Music Award at the 2026 SOCAN Gala.

== Discography ==
=== Albums ===
- TDJ123 (2022)
- TDJ (2025)

=== EPs ===
- TDJ001 (2020)
- TDJ002 (2021)
- BACK TO 123 (2023)

=== Compilations ===
- SPF INFINI (2021)
- SPF INFINI 2 (2022)
- SPF INFINI 3 (2023)
- SPF INFINI: GENESIS (2024)

=== Singles ===
- The Sea (TDJ Remix), with Romy (2023)
- Come Back Home (2024)
- Illusion, with Ascendant Vierge (2024)
- SIREN is OUT OF REACH [TDJ], with Shygirl (2025)
- Shoreline (jamesjamesjames Remix) (2025)
- Where Is My Angel (Cult Member Remix) (2025)
- On and On (You Lie) [Gabriel & Dresden Remix] (2025)
- The Long Night (TDJ Remix), with Purity Ring (2025)
