= Liam Benzvi =

American singer-songwriter

Liam Benzvi is an American singer-songwriter and composer. Benzvi has released two solo EPs, Amnesia, USA and Covers, and two solo LPs, Acts of Service and ...And His Splash Band. Benzvi has released two albums with the band Strange Names. He lives and works in New York.

== Early life and education ==
Benzvi was born and raised in Brooklyn, New York.

Benzvi attended New York's LaGuardia High School and he went on to study at the University of Minnesota/Guthrie Theater BFA Actor Training Program.

== Career ==
Benzvi has a baritone voice and his music is known for its sultry shoegaze and dream pop qualities.

Benzvi, Francis Ximenez, and Fletcher Aleckson are founding members of the Brooklyn-based new wave-pop band Strange Names. The band has released two LPs, Use Your Time Wisely (Frenchkiss Records, 2015) and Data (Frenchkiss Records, 2018). The band opened for a number of New York-based musicians, including his former classmate Azealia Banks. He lists Indoor Life, Lizzy Mercier Descloux, Patrick Cowley, and Tuxedomoon as musical inspirations for the band.

His first solo EP, Amnesia, USA, was released in 2019 under Terrible Records.

Benzvi's first solo LP, Acts of Service, was released in 2022 under Terrible Records. The 10-track album was co-produced by Wet's Joe Valle. A music video for the single, "Hiccup", was directed by Luca Venter.

In 2022, Benzvi performed alongside Dev Hynes on The Tonight Show Starring Jimmy Fallon and Hynes, Tariq Al-Sabir, Eva Tolkin, and Ian Isiah at Madison Square Garden as part of Harry Styles's Love on Tour. He has opened for other artists such as Janelle Monáe, Yeasayer, Porches, the Drums, and Wet.

Benzvi's second solo EP, Covers, was released in December 2024 through Fat Possum Records.

The musician cites Cyndi Lauper, The B-52's, Siouxsie Sioux, the Cure, Blonde Redhead, Frou Frou, and Madonna's early 2000 albums as influences.
