= George Clanton =

American musician (born 1988)

- Clanton at the Black Cat in 2026

Background information
- Also known as: ESPRIT 空想; Mirror Kisses; Kid's Garden; CHINA
- Born: George Wayland Clanton Jr. January 12, 1988 (age 38); Ridgeway, Virginia, U.S.
- Genres: Chillwave; synth-pop; baggy; neo-psychedelia; hypnagogic pop; vaporwave
- Occupations: Musician; singer-songwriter; DJ; composer; remixer; record producer; entrepreneur
- Instruments: Synthesizer; guitar; vocals
- Years active: 2007–present
- Label: 100% Electronica
- Spouse: Neggy Gemmy (m. 2020-present)
- Website: georgeclanton.com

George Wayland Clanton Jr. (born January 12, 1988), also known by the monikers Mirror Kisses, ESPRIT 空想, CHINA, and Kid's Garden, is an American electronic musician and singer-songwriter that emerged from the vaporwave music scene in the early 2010s. He established his independent record label 100% Electronica in 2015, and in 2019 launched the first vaporwave music festival, 100% ElectroniCON.

== Life ==
George Clanton was born in Ridgeway, Virginia. He grew up going to punk rock shows. His career began when he accidentally downloaded a misnamed Brian Jonestown Massacre song, which led him down an Internet rabbit hole where he discovered "a whole new world of music" which inspired him to write and release his own under the pseudonym Mirror Kisses, and later ESPRIT 空想 (“fantasy” in Japanese). He decided to start using his real name before releasing his 2015 album 100% Electronica, because "[he] didn't want to release one more album as Mirror Kisses", and he "hated saying 'Mirror Kisses' every time someone asked [him his] band name." He tried to make a sequel to 100% Electronica for three years but felt that he failed, because he wasn't able to find the sound he wanted for it. After giving up, he started experimenting and writing stuff for fun and felt that the "songs [were writing] themselves". Eventually, this material transformed into his next album, Slide, released in 2018, where he incorporated electric guitar and acoustic drums as well. In 2020, he would release a collaborative studio album with Nick Hexum, titled George Clanton & Nick Hexum. Prior to headlining a tour in 2021, Clanton would release the track "Fucking Up My Life", which would later become the lead single for his third studio album Ooh Rap I Ya, released two years later. Further, in 2024, a collaborative album with TV Girl would be released titled Fauxllennium.

In 2015 he established his record label 100% Electronica along with his then-girlfriend, now wife, fellow musical artist Neggy Gemmy (Lindsey French). He and Neggy Gemmy both hail from Virginia and played their first show together in 2011 along with other artists such as Skylar Spence. In 2019, they launched 100% Electronicon, the first vaporwave music festival.

Clanton streams his live performances regularly on Twitch and YouTube. He described New York City as his favorite city in the world to perform.

Clanton has a degree in anthropology and taught himself computer programming in order to create virtual interactive experiences for his record label.

== Songwriting and style ==
George Clanton's music has been described as a fusion of electropop, trip hop, and vaporwave, while also using elements of grunge, acid house, and shoegaze. Critics have also associated his music with chillwave and hypnagogic pop. Clanton noted that unlike some vaporwave artists, he does not try to be "ironic" or "silly with his lyrics", and prefers to "write great pop songs that are representative of an emotion that [he] actually [feels] when [he's] singing them." He described his album Slide as a "vaporwave opera". When he finds a sound that he likes, he uses it as often as he can, believing it helps him make his albums sound more cohesive and iconic. Clanton's aim for his music is to evoke "nostalgia". When he starts writing a song, he randomly presses notes on his keyboard instrument and cycles through patches and effects until they trigger emotions and memories on him.

Although he is frequently associated with vaporwave, Clanton himself states that he embraces the tag largely for marketing purposes, and does not consider himself strictly a vaporwave musician. Vaporwave is primarily an instrumental genre, which contradicts Clanton's use of vocals. His only conscious attempt at the genre was with the ESPRIT 空想 side project.

== Influences ==
George Clanton's influences include Seal, Anton Newcombe, The Prodigy, New Order, and 311, which was the first band he saw live. Clanton collaborated with 311's Nick Hexum on several songs which they released in 2019, as well as a full album in 2020.

== Discography ==
=== As George Clanton ===
- 100% Electronica (2015)
- Slide (2018)
- George Clanton & Nick Hexum (2020; collaborative album with Nick Hexum)
- Ooh Rap I Ya (2023)
- Fauxllennium (2024; collaborative album with TV Girl)

=== As ESPRIT 空想 ===
- 「Girls Only」 (EP; 2012)
- Summer Night (EP; 2013)
- Relax™ (2013)
- Virtua.zip (2014)
- 200% Electronica (2017)

=== As Mirror Kisses ===
- Soaking Wet (2008)
- Dance Decree / Light Hearted (2009)
- Bad Dreams (2012)
- Heartbeats (2013)

=== As Kid's Garden ===
- Further (2007)
- Lord, Amen (2009)
- Don't Call Me Yours (2011)
- DARLING (2014)

=== As CHINA ===
- Follow Me (2016)
- Strong (2016)
