= Desert Sand Feels Warm at Night =

desert sand feels warm at night
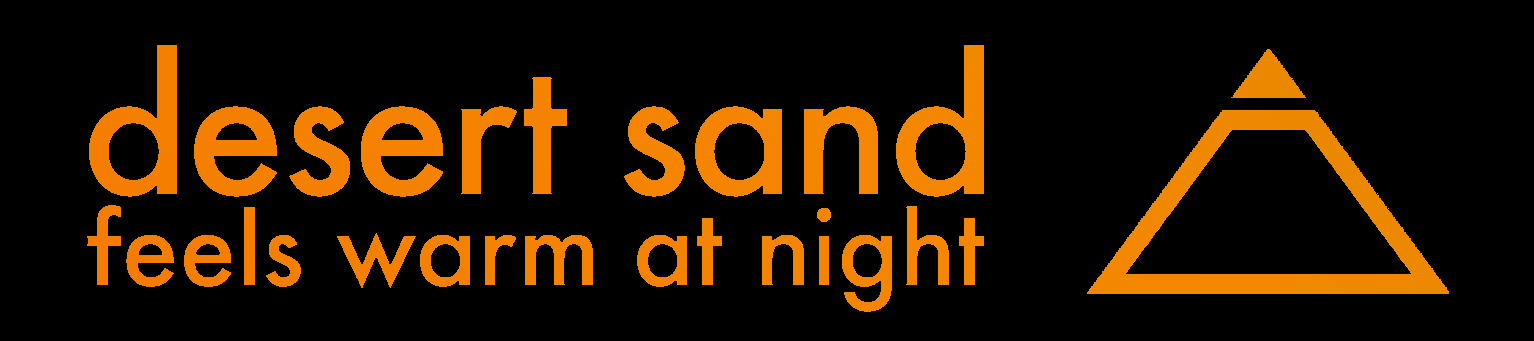
- Logo from the cover art for Dream Desert (2022)

Background information
- Born: William Hallworth-Cook; United Kingdom
- Genres: Ambient, dreampunk; electronic, plunderphonics, vaporwave, slushwave
- Occupations: Producer, musician
- Years active: 2018–present
- Labels: Geometric Lullaby, Needlejuice Records
- Website: desertsand.bandcamp.com

William Hallworth-Cook, known professionally as Desert Sand Feels Warm at Night or simply Desert Sand, (Note: Stylized in all lowercase.) (Note: Simplified alias featured in the project's Bandcamp URL.) is a British electronic musician recognized as a key figure in the modern vaporwave scene, particularly for his contributions to the slushwave and dreampunk subgenres. He is best known for his work in the late 2010s and early 2020s, in which long-form ambient tracks and themes of spirituality evolving on the style of t e l e p a t h テレパシー能力者 initially popularised him within the scene.

Hallworth-Cook released his debut album as Desert Sand Feels Warm At Night in 2018, becoming recognized in the slushwave genre for his output of both sampled and non-sampled albums like New World Disciples (2021) and Dream Desert (2022). He also has collaborated with musicians such as Angel Marcloid's alias Mindspring Memories, has worked with labels such as Geometric Lullaby and Needlejuice Records, participated in vaporwave festivals such as George Clanton's ElectroniCON 3 and is a host of the annual Slushwave music festival. Hallworth-Cook's sample-free releases, as well as his methods of sampling, have been noted for impacting and evolving the slushwave subgenre. New World Disciples was highlighted by several publications as his most popular release, while Dream Desert was named one of the greatest albums of 2022 by WKNC-FM.

== Career ==
=== Debut and early work as Desert Sand (2018–2020) ===
William Hallworth-Cook's music prior to the Desert Sand Feels Warm at Night pseudonym consisted mostly of minor aliases focusing on faster-paced electronic music. He began experimenting with combinations of vaporwave and ambient, and in 2018 would establish the Desert Sand Feels Warm At Night moniker. Hallworth-Cook would gain exposure in 2019 with sampled releases such as Prisoner, cassette releases for albums including his The Hanging Gardens of Babylon duology, and his first unsampled album, Forgive and Forget. Hallworth-Cook stated that this release was "a real treat for me to make", as he and his fans found "inner peace" from listening to it. Its fourth track, "Cherry Blossom", as well as "Constellation" from the dreampunk-led Tomorrow, 2096 (2019), were both featured in official playlists by NTS Radio in December 2025. He would continue to release and experiment with sample-free slushwave in 2020 with the further releases of another three unsampled albums, including Night Road and Everlasting Summer.

=== Growth and increased popularity (2021–present) ===
Desert Sand's third album of 2021, New World Disciples, was released in May. To promote the album, a music video for the track "He Is Here" accompanied the album's release, featuring what Mick R. of New Noise Magazine described as a message "about the nature of work and our relationship to technology". In February 2022, Hallworth-Cook released Dream Desert, which was named one of the best albums of 2022 by WKNC-FM. Its YouTube upload by archival channel Vapor Memory was highlighted by Dennis Mikula, owner of record label Geometric Lullaby, for its amount of views on the platform surpassing the two million mark. Working with Hallworth-Cook on a vinyl pressing for the album, he noted it as one of his hardest and most expensive releases on the label, but one which "made sense."

In 2020, Hallworth-Cook would host the first Slushwave festival, originally entirely online. The festival would continue annually, with him being a host from 2020 onwards. In August of 2022, he would perform his first in-person live set at the third edition of ElectroniCON, a vaporwave music festival organized by musician George Clanton in New York, being described by Tori-Lynne Davis of Bearded Gentlemen Music as a "particularly interest[ing]" figure of the event. Hallworth-Cook reported feeling nervous in anticipation, and said it had not "sunk in throughout the years of this project that it has a big fanbase." In a 2022 interview, he hinted at a future collaboration with electronic musician MindSpring Memories, which was the 2023 release Desert Memories.

In 2025, Hallworth-Cook performed again in Brooklyn for Flamingofest, a vaporwave festival promoted by labels Utopia District and My Pet Flamingo. During the same year, he also released a video album for a compilation of works from 2022 to 2024 on his YouTube channel, under the alias Paradise Mountain. Beginning with its first physical event in 2024, Hallworth-Cook would perform at the annual Slushwave festival in Kortrijk, Belgium. In January of 2025, the digital audio workstation plugin producer Ember DSP would collaborate with Hallworth-Cook and release Transcendence VST, a VST plugin made for usage in ambient, namely slushwave production. Ember DSP would release another plugin assisted by Hallworth-Cook, Stratos, in August of 2026.

== Impact ==
Hallworth-Cook's music was highlighted by many publications for evolving the sound of vaporwave and of the slushwave subgenre, mainly due to his sample-free production on several albums. He has been recognized as one of the subgenre's key figures, and his music highlighted for its perceived emotional power. Tori-Lynne Davis highlighted the project's "impressive" evocation of nostalgic themes without using any samples, while Mick called his work "transportative" and transcendental.

The Spiritual Arts Foundation commented that the Desert Sand discography, specifically New World Disciples, "cements [him] ... as a scene-transcending heavyweight of expressionistic soundcraft." The melodies of earlier albums such as Prisoner and Forgive and Forget were also described as "delicate and heartfelt", according to the institute. Davis highlighted how "immense" the soundscape of Dream Desert seems and said the album channels "otherworldy energies" that exemplify the project's ability to "conjure sweeping emotions." WKNC-FM described Dream Desert as "vaporwave at its most potent" and "the most soothing album" of 2022, praising the album for its exploration of "magic moments" throughout its four-hour runtime.

== Artistry ==
=== Influences and production ===
Hallworth-Cook's main points of inspiration were the music of slushwave figure Telepath, an alias of American electronic musician Luke Laurila, as well as various Japanese musicians such as Hiroko Yakushimaru and S. Kiyotaka & Omega Tribe. Laurila's music specifically, which started being recommended to him by the music streaming service Spotify, made him "[fall] in love" with slushwave and vaporwave, prompting him to create his own output within the scene. He uses illustrations by visual designer Zer0 as album covers for many of his releases, with the anonymous nature of his music's presentation accompanying his "genuineness and humanity", according to Mick. Hallworth-Cook also draws his visual style from 1980s Japanese commercials; during the production of Dense Fog (2019), he chose its album cover and name based on an advert featuring "this barren, purple, lonely road going out to nothing. I was almost tearing up saying to myself that this is perfect." He stated the vaporwave musician he looked forward to the most for vaporwave festival ElectroniCon 3 was Luxury Elite.

Although Hallworth-Cook has used samples in many of his releases, most notably on Dream Desert, he is best known for his sample-free work on albums such as New World Disciples, which follow on similar trends of vaporwave albums such as 2814's Birth of a New Day (2015). His first experiment with this type of slushwave, the 2019 release Forgive and Forget, was described by him as still "hold[ing] a special place in my heart", and said its melodies affected him emotionally as he created them. He reported having slept late many times to explore musical ideas he had while producing, and stated that these sessions vary greatly in mood, speed and effectiveness; as an exampled, he recalled that the opening track of New World Disciples, "Eternal Hope", took only two hours to create. Of his sample-based work, Hallworth-Cook highlighted "a lot of meticulous sample manipulation in play", mentioning the first 11 minutes of Dream Desert's opening track featuring a second-long cut from the end of the original sample. In response to a pun on the terms vaporwave and vaping, Hallworth-Cook said he does not smoke. He travelled to the desert twice in his life, those being Death Valley and "one near Dubai".

=== Musical style ===
William Hallworth-Cook's music has been variously categorised as vaporwave, ambient, dreampunk, electronic, experimental, new age, and slushwave, often being inspired by and sampling genres such as C-pop, Japanese city pop and soul. His work before Desert Sand explored electronic genres such as deep house and trance, while of his later music, the Spiritual Arts Foundation described its popularity level as bridging the gap between underground scenes of electronic music and more mainstream ethereal styles, "as much Julianna Barwick as 2814."

Some of the main characteristics of Desert Sand include an abstract usage of sampling, atmospheric tracks focused on tonal qualities and spiritual themes such as transcendence and life after death. The alias is also characterised by its prolific frequency of releases, often expressing a liminal nature. On the diversity of potential interpretations for music in the vaporwave genre, Hallworth-Cook praised the scene for its community-led direction and what he perceived as boundary-pushing releases, and said he would enjoy seeing combinations of slushwave with subgenres such as signalwave or future funk. He commented on slushwave especially in a positive note: "If you look at genres of the past, there's a very clear progression as technology and instruments improved over time. Slushwave, on the other hand, just emerged one day."

Prisoner features a more introspective nature and explores ideas of "loneliness, dysphoria and feelings of being trapped within oneself," as described by the Spiritual Arts Foundation; its closing track, the 23-minute-long "To Leave", presents slow-paced bass vocals and a soundscape that "touches the soul". Forgive and Forget demonstrates the reverberation in his music complementing the "delicate and heartfelt" melodies, according to the institute, with its chords expressing melancholic tones and emotions such as peace and love.

New World Disciples features spiritual themes that highlight a form of escapism in Hallworth-Cook's music, from "the fabric of modernity [...] to the divine," according to Mick. Conceptually, the album relates to the withdrawal from an artificial life in favor of a more naturalistic, spiritually-headed "new world", with the press release by Needlejuice Records describing it as "an escape from the dull, bleak and dehumanising realities of modern civilization." Dream Desert, Desert Sand's longest release, comprises nearly four hours of ambient tracks ranging from 20 to 40 minutes, featuring slow-paced melodies that turn "each track an experience of its own," as described to WKNC-FM. Davis called it evocative in its mysterious presentation, as it asks "the viewer to explore this desert for themselves and make their own discoveries."

== Selected discography ==
2018

- Star.wav
- Crystal Glassware with Luxury Ballpoint Pen
- Autumnal Bitrate
- Intense Emotions (激しい感情, Hageshī kanjō)
- Sparkling Water
- Lonely with VAW

2019

- Prisoner (囚人, Shūjin)
- 0:21
- The Hanging Gardens of Babylon (Part 1) (バビロンの空中庭園 上, Babiron no kūchū teien-jō)
- Drowning (溺死, Nìsǐ)
- To Be Called to Heaven (天に召される, Ten'nimesareru)
- The Hanging Gardens of Babylon (Part 2) (バビロンの空中庭園 下, Babiron no kūchū teien-ka)
- Forgive and Forget (水に流す, Mizuninagasu)
- Midnight Mansions
- By Myself (一人で, Hitorite)
- Life Is an Illusion (人生は幻想です, Jinsei wa gensōdesu) with Mystery
- Tomorrow, 2096
- Dense Fog (濃霧, Nōmu)
- Ambivision HD
- Dream Waterfall (夢の滝, Yumenotaki)

2020

- Night Road (夜道, Yomichi)
- 0:22
- Yin-Yang
- Eternal Summer (常夏, Tokonatsu)
- Floating in a Sea of Clouds (雲海に漂う, Unkai ni tadayou)
- A Journey to Utopia (ユートピアへの旅, Utopia e no tabi)
- Forever

2021

- 0:23
- I Think, Therefore I Am (我思う、ゆえに我あり, Ga omou, yueni ga ari)
- New World Disciples (新世界の弟子たち, Shin sekai no deshi-tachi)
- Piano Soliloquy (ピアノの独り言, Piano no hitorigoto)

2022

- View of Shropshire (シュロップシャーの景色, Shuroppushā no keshiki)
- Dream Desert (夢の砂漠, Yume no sabaku)
- Messenger of Death (Burmese: သေမင်းတမန်, saymainntamaan)

2023

- To Shed Silent Tears (暗涙に咽ぶ, Kura namidanimusebu)
- Desert Memories with MindSpring Memories

2024

- Kagoshima Desert (鹿児島 砂漠, Kagoshima sabaku) with Tangerine
- Perli tal-passat

2025–present

- Vjaġġ tal-Qalb (2025)
- Foresti Traxxendenti (2026)
- Desert Sand Reimagined with Alice Mills (2026)

== See also ==
- 1980s in Japan
- Journey (2012), a video game taking place in a desert similar to the album art for New World Disciples (2021)
