= Telepath (musician) =

t e l e p a t h テレパシー能力者
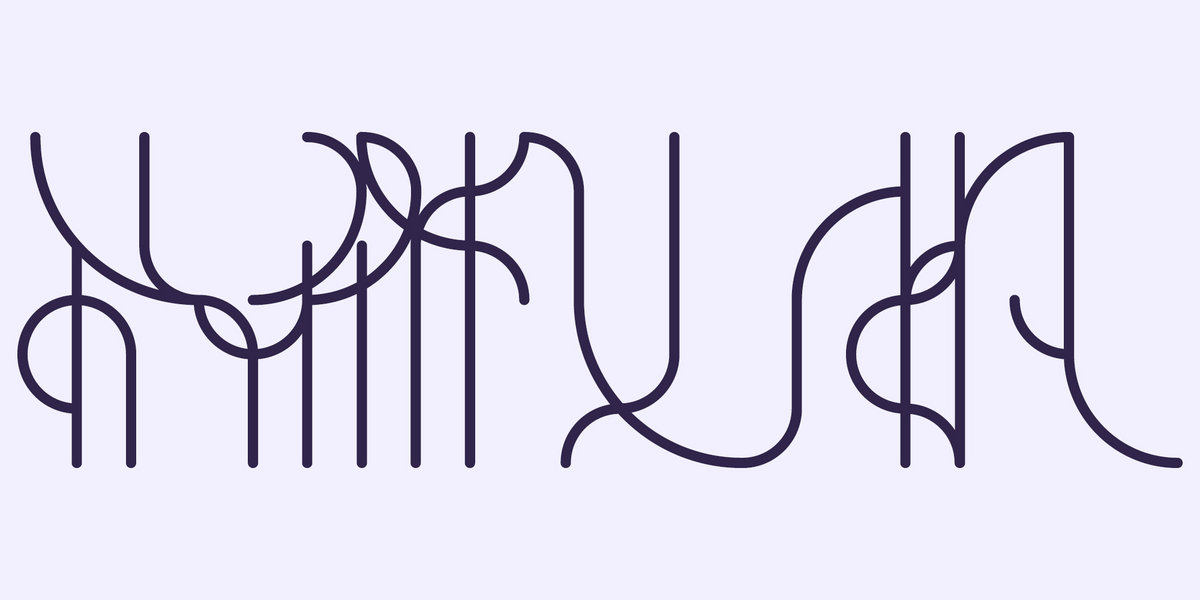
- 2025 pseudonym

Background information
- Also known as: Tianhuojian; Virtual Dream Plaza; ᓷᓺᓺᕿᔍᕣᒔᖍ; Starlight Temple
- Born: Luke Laurila; 1997 (age 28–29); United States
- Origin: Akron, Ohio, United States
- Genres: Ambient, electronic, plunderphonics, vaporwave, slushwave; dreampunk
- Occupations: Producer, musician
- Years active: 2013–present
- Labels: Dream Catalogue, Geometric Lullaby, Plus100
- Member of: 2814, Lovers Entwined
- Website: music.spirit.love

Luke Laurila, better known as Telepath (Japanese: t e l e p a t h テレパシー能力者, Hepburn: terepashī nōryoku-sha), is an American musician notable for his considerable impact within the vaporwave scene. During the mid-2010s, his ambient sound and dream-like presentation turned him into the main originator of the slushwave subgenre and a key influence on the dreampunk derivative genre. He initially released albums under the alias Scintillation! and later as Virtual Dream Plaza (仮想夢プラザ, Kasō yume puraza) and Tianhuojian (天火見).

Laurila released his debut album as Telepath in 2013, and began producing split albums with vaporwave artists such as Cat System Corp. He became a notable figure of the genre for his prolific output in 2014 and 2015, and for co-founding Dream Catalogue, the first vaporwave-focused record label. His work with David Russo under the alias 2814, including Birth of a New Day (2015) and Rain Temple (2016), is recognized for innovating the vaporwave genre beyond purely sample-based material. He also distanced the movement from its semi-ironic roots with The Path to Lost Eden, his split album with musician Nmesh. Birth of a New Day became one of the best-selling releases on Bandcamp, while The Path to Lost Eden originated internal discussions culminating with the hardvapour subgenre. Laurila's hazy style of music and idiosyncratic sampling methods have impacted musicians both within and outside the vaporwave genre, such as MindSpring Memories and desert sand feels warm at night, while his work in 2814 solidified his status as a "vaporwave superstar".

== Career ==
=== Early work and debut as Telepath (2011-2013) ===
Luke Laurila released his earliest music under the alias Scintillation! and was focused on general electronic ambient music. Under this alias, he released 14 albums and 21 EPs from 2011 to 2013, including remixes of songs by electronic duo Boards of Canada. (Note: Boards of Canada's 2013 release Tomorrow's Harvest features a track called "Telepath"; Laurila has never clarified whether this is the origin of the alias or not.)

Laurila started producing vaporwave in 2013, releasing his debut album Together and two other solo albums under the Telepath alias during the year. Around this time, he produced two split albums with other artists from the scene: 2013's Nightlife with Silver Richards, and 2014's Interstellar Love with Vincent Remember. According to Laurila, the seventh track on Nightlife, "Betrayal", was his first definitive slushwave track. He tended to encounter artists to collaborate with on the music streaming platform SoundCloud, where he eventually met David Russo, also known as HKE. Laurila contacted Russo about releasing Interstellar Love on Dream Catalogue, Russo's record label. This event shifted the label's focus from personal usage by Russo to a vaporwave-focused release roster, which attracted a considerable audience. To promote the album, the label released a music video for its titular track on February 22.

=== Newfound popularity and collaborative releases (2014) ===
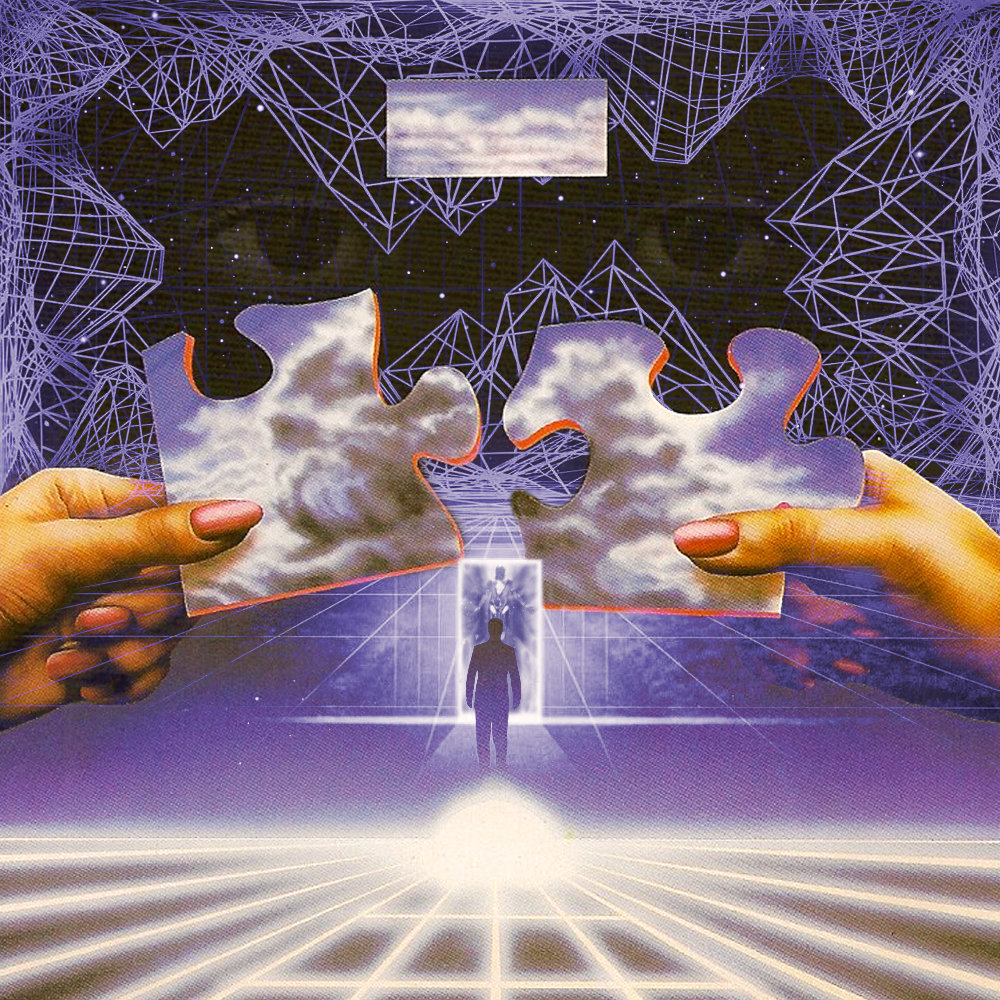
The album cover of Fragmented Memories (2014)

During 2014, Laurila released Telepathic and Blue Dream, two split albums with Dutch musician Jornt Elzinga as Cat System Corp. Three music videos for tracks from Telepathic were released: "Direction" on May 28, "Fantasy" on May 30, and "Love After Midnight" on July 15. The third was created by Elzinga, who, on October 4, released a video for one of Laurila's earlier tracks, "Faint Light" from To the Future (2014). The two musicians later came to lead the project Fragmented Memories, a large-scale collaborative album featuring a variety of musicians from the vaporwave genre. According to Elzinga, the Telepath project had already garnered a significant amount of listeners by this point, with the release of Beyond Reality in June marking what Laurila called a turning point for the alias and a "special milestone where clarity of intention was reached".

By the end of the year, there were 20 releases under the Telepath alias, including Disembodiment, Face to Face, and Amaterasu. Amaterasu was later chosen by vaporwave musician Angel Marcloid, owner of the alias MindSpring Memories, as one of her favorite albums on Bandcamp, the music sharing website that currently hosts Laurila's music. His work with Russo on the album 2814 helped establish the eponymous alias as a sample-free vaporwave project; this, according to Resident Advisor writer Andrew Ryce, began a new development for the vaporwave movement, as it shifted perspectives of the scene being a temporary piece of Internet culture to a completely new music genre. Laurila later described the transition from 2014 into 2015 as the time period where he achieved his full potential with the Telepath alias.

=== Further collaborations, Virtual Dream Plaza and departure from classic style (2015) ===
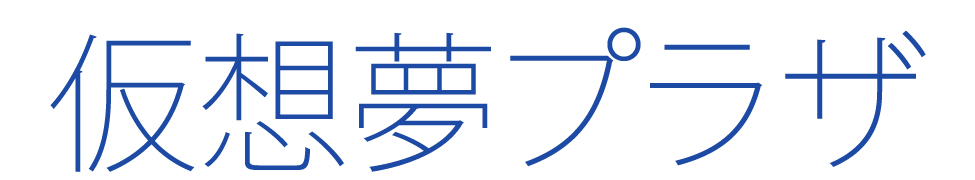
Logo for Luke Laurila's Virtual Dream Plaza pseudonym

January 2015 marked the creation of a new alias by Laurila, Taihe Zhizeng, with the release of Mysterious Lover. During the same month, Laurila collaborated with Russo on Love / Sorrow and on 2814's second album, Birth of a New Day. The latter reached the No. 2 spot on Bandcamp's ambient charts, and became one of the best-selling albums on the website. Antara Communication, released on February 2, was later described by Laurila as his favorite release as Telepath, as it "successfully captured everything I had been intending to up until that point." To promote his upcoming split record with vaporwave artist Golden Living Room, named Virtual Phantasy 2097, Laurila released three music videos: "Bliss" on February 8, "Healing" on February 13, and "Memories" on February 15. The first release from Laurila's Virtual Dream Plaza project, Waiting for You was released in May, with vaporwave trio Death's Dynamic Shroud releasing a looping music video for the project's next album, Here She Comes, in June. Another music video for two records from this alias, Desire and Sensuality, was released by Laurila on October 2.

In October, Laurila and electronic musician Vaperror, the alias of Jeff Cardinal, released the album Beyond Love under the collaborative pseudonym Televape. It was the first release of Cardinal's label Plus100. Laurila also worked with Nmesh on The Path to Lost Eden during the same month, when Dream Catalogue released what was described by Fact as a "psilocybin-soaked album trailer" for their collaboration. He also released four Virtual Dream Plaza albums with track and artist titles in Mandarin instead of Japanese. November saw the release of Laurila's second collaborative album with HKE outside the 2814 alias, Gateway. It originated from a request by musician Equip for Laurila to release a record on his label Baro. For his final slushwave Telepath album, Interstellar Intercourse, Laurila released a music video for the track "Enchanting Beauty" on December 19, ending what Nick Caceres of RateYourMusic called his most prolific year.

=== All for You, Rain Temple and Eternity (2016) ===
Laurila's first creation of 2016 was a music video for the Interstellar Intercourse track "Late Night Love", released on January 5. He also produced a track for Hacking for Freedom, a collaborative project led by musician wosX. He described Laurila's work as the album's highlight, and the track's music video was released on January 17. After Endless Desire, his fifth release as Virtual Dream Plaza in Mandarin, Dream Catalogue released two music videos for tracks from Birth of a New Day: "Distant Lovers" on February 27, and "Recovery" on August 20. In April and May, Laurila built funk-led musical mixes for Tiny Mix Tapes and Bandwagon respectively. In June, he released the split album Balance, a collaboration with musician Useless, under the Virtual Dream Plaza alias. His first release as "Telepath" only, All for You/Sensuality and its accompanying music video were released on June 30, 2016. It was later chosen by the Charlatans lead singer Tim Burgess as one of his favorite Bandcamp releases.

An official vaporwave playlist released in July by streaming service Spotify featured five of Laurila's tracks: two from Andromeda (2014) and three from Birth of a New Day. In September, Laurila released Secret Lover, which was described by Bandcamp Daily's Ari Delaney as one of his many "complex, emotional musical experiences". Dream Catalogue's music video for "Eyes of the Temple", a track from 2814's next release Rain Temple (2016), was released on September 18. On October 3, Telepath and Vaperror returned as Televape with the release Eternity, and a video album was released the same day. Laurila's next record as Telepath, titled A, was released in November. Three albums featuring participation by Laurila—Rain Temple, Eternity, and A— were listed by Simon Chandler of Bandcamp Daily as some of the best physical vaporwave releases of 2016. According to writer Lucy March, the quality of Telepath's physical releases caused them to later be resold for "hundreds of dollars".

=== 100% ElectroniCON, Building a Better World and work as Tianhuojian (2017–2023) ===
In July 2017, Laurila released a new single under his old stylized Telepath moniker, titled "Farewell". In October 2017, Laurila and musician Agia produced the collaborative single "Circle of Love", one of seven tracks from their album as Lovers Entwined, The Light of Our Love. During the same year, developer Dan Vogt included some of Telepath's music, alongside tracks by artists such as George Clanton and Luxury Elite, in his 2D mobile racing game Data Wing. After another collaboration with Agia on 2018's Unison, Laurila performed in 2019 for the second edition of 100% ElectroniCON, Clanton's vaporwave music festival. To maintain his anonymity, he wore a dark costume obfuscating his face and body. According to Flood Magazine, Laurila told future funk musician Ryan DeRobertis that, after finishing the performance, "he now understood the appeal of live performance after years of avoiding it."

In June 2019, Laurila released Building a Better World, his third split album with Jornt Elzinga. The first release on Hiraeth Records, Elzinga's then-recent label, it was chosen as one of the best ambient releases of August 2019 by Ari Delaney. Three music videos were released for the album's tracks: "Dawn over the Metropolis" on June 12, 2019, "Sector 131" on December 14, 2021, and "Awakening" (Note: Translation of "目覚め", the original title.) on July 17, 2022. In 2022, Laurila released a music video for the album Wading in the Afterlife, his first release under the alias Tianhuojian. In 2023, The Path to Lost Eden received its first vinyl pressing, the album's second physical release since an original cassette run in 2015. In 2022, Laurila began releasing music under the alias Tianhuojian. His first release, Wading in the Afterlife, was released on April 4, 2022 with an accompanying music video. It was part of a self-imposed challenge for Laurila, where he would attempt to "to shoot a 40+ minute film in only 3 hours with no prepreparation or planning." In 2022, Laurila released his final album as Virtual Dream Plaza in Mandarin, Four Beauties, with 2023's Beyond the Dream serving as the pseudonym's last record.

=== Return to classic style (2025–present) ===
2025's Dawn Arrives marked Laurila's return to the Telepath alias, being is his first release as Telepath since 2019's Flora Miranda's LaLaLand Fashion Show, as well as his first classic-style slushwave releases in the 10-year hiatus since Interstellar Intercourse. He also released four other albums during the year, making it the "year of Telepath", according to Frederick Bloy of Atwood Magazine. During this time, Laurila also inaugurated two new pseudonyms: ᖚᓷᓺᓺᕿᔍᕣᒔᖍ, a mixture of Canadian Aboriginal syllabics, and Starlight Temple, in contrast with his other aliases featuring the Japanese language.

== Legacy ==
Laurila's music has been recognized for contributing to the ambient proliferations of vaporwave. He has also contributed to the creation of what some writers call post-vaporwave, and his slow-paced sound defined the "slushwave" subgenre, a term quoted by Laurila himself. Of this term, Nick Caceres said the creation of such a style led to some of the best vaporwave releases, and made several listeners consider him "a luminary of the movement." With The Path to Lost Eden, his cinematic usage of samples, according to Andrew Ryce, elevated the vaporwave genre towards a less ironic direction. However, this new direction, Ryce wrote, generated infighting within the movement, which resulted in the creation of the hardvapour subgenre. In the opinion of Tiny Mix Tapes, Laurila's Virtual Dream Plaza series classifies him as "one of the purest of adventurers."

Laurila's work with David Russo on the 2814 alias especially garnered him significant praise, and remains his most well-known output. The duo was described by Vice as "vaporwave superstars", with writer Britt Brown describing Birth of a New Day as "amazing cyberfuture ambient vaporwave". As the most critically acclaimed vaporwave project, 2814 broke the common association between vaporwave and plunderphonics; according to Rolling Stone, the duo has "captured all the romance and wistfulness through bold, original compositions."

David Russo stated that Telepath is an important musical alias not only within the vaporwave genre, but outside of it as well. He wrote of the project as "genuine," contrasting Laurila's music with vaporwave's traditional appearances of irony, and said his collaborative production process with him represents "some of the most enjoyable experiences I've ever had making music." Jornt Elzinga said Laurila's music presents its own original worldview within the scene, and that he is proud to call him a friend, while Dennis Mikula, owner of record label Geometric Lullaby, listed Telepath as his favorite vaporwave artist. Angel Marcloid, whose work as MindSpring Memories was described as "the only name that has managed to compete" by Ondarock's Manfredi Zappalà, wrote that she "absolutely loves" the Telepath alias for "discover[ing] a sound that was all his own". British electronic musician William Hallworth-Cook said finding Laurila's music was one of the main inspirations for his releases under the vaporwave alias Desert Sand Feels Warm at Night, including sample-free albums such as New World Disciples.

== Music and influences ==
=== Production and visuals ===
"The focus should be on the art itself and the meaning it carries—not the creator, not how it was created, and not some explanation of why it's 'good.' If the piece on its own isn't enough, then it's not very good. That's why I prefer anonymous art: it helps prevent everything outside the work from getting in the way of what actually matters."

— Luke Laurila

Genres explored by Laurila's music include vaporwave, ambient, ambient dub, contemporary R&B, dance pop, dreampunk, drone, funk, lo-fi, new age, post-vaporwave, progressive electronic, slowcore, sophisti-pop, slushwave, smooth jazz, synth-funk, and techno, most often sampling J-pop songs from his personal collection of discs. Artists sampled include Alexander O'Neal, Greg Adams, Toshifumi Hinata and Warren Hill. In his Bandcamp recommendations page, Laurila lists ambient artists such as Mort Aux Vaches. His music also takes heavy inspiration from works by Boards of Canada, and the 2814 project was compared to the music of Oneohtrix Point Never and Kavinsky. According to his Reverb.com account, Laurila has bought at least over 70 synthesizers since June 2023, and was described as a "synth maniac" by other vaporwave musicians.

According to Laurila, his sound partly intends to evoke a dreamlike mood, as well as "yet deeper meanings." His music is mainly characterized by constant reverberation and phaser effects, strong bass, and constant sample looping. It is distinct from traditional vaporwave's reliance on nostalgia and aesthetics, in that many tracks highlight a more hazy and ambient soundscape; according to Randall of In Sheep's Clothing, "You don't listen to Telepath to get anywhere. You listen to dissolve." His work is also noted for long track runtimes and prolific frequency of releases, including almost a hundred 31-minute-long single-track albums released under the Virtual Dream Plaza alias, two 44-minute-long tracks on the 2015 release Another Night Together, a 56-minute long track on Face to Face, and a seven-hour-long side project; as described by Cokemachineglow writer Adam Downer, the Telepath project presents a "tendency towards maximalism". Downer highlighted Laurila's usage of the Japanese language as giving a sense of mystery to his music, while Jonathan Xinsei listed this as one of the reasons his work as 2814 became popular. The anonymity of Laurila's music and presentation was compared by Il Tascabile's Riccardo Papacci to musician Burial's attempt at hiding his identity.

Album covers featuring images of Japanese women from 1980s commercials also play a large role in emphasizing aspects of East Asian culture, and the anonymous, liminal nature of these images was compared by Lucy March to the impersonal atmosphere of cyberpunk novels such as Neuromancer. On the Bandcamp page of the Virtual Dream Plaza project, where these women eventually received the nickname "Dream Girl", these appear either as a singular photo or a triplet of the same commercial. Nostalgia, spirituality, sensuality, romance, extraterrestrial life, indigenous mythology and "old world teachings" are also themes present throughout Laurila's work; the project's official URL is "music.spirit.love", and Caceres described the spiritual aspect of his music as a likely origin for the name Telepath. In his only interview, conducted in 2025 by RateYourMusic's Sonemic, Laurila gave what Frederick Bloy called "abstruse, evasive" answers: "When asked about the title [of Another Night Together], Laurila explains, or rather doesn't; 'she is the reason my music exists, my reason to be. There is no me without us... She is with me always, and yet must leave me alone in this world. I ask her to stay, but I know the answer, I know the truth... I deeply cherish every moment with my loves, and that loving devotion is sonified in the music, all of the music.'" The pseudonym's abstention from vaporwave's political discourse of "destroy[ing] the narratives that built the techno-capitalistic zeitgeist" was also noted by Downer. Alternatively, when commenting on the Dream Girl as featured on the cover arts for I Need You, You and I Forever and Dream Girl–all sourced from the same makeup commercial–writer Marzia Farris felt she embodies the alienation produced by the continuous reproduction of commodities, "both consumer and consumed", and compared her role to that of the Jeune-Fille created by anarchist collective Tiqqun.

=== Style ===
"So Much in Love" (愛そんなに–, Ai son'nani)
The 66th track on Fragmented Memories (2014). It takes its title from the sample's lyrics: "A promise inside your heart / We're so much in love"

"Wading in the Afterlife I" (涉水来世一, Shè shuǐ láishì yī)
Laurila's work as Tianhuojian is mainly characterized by drone-led sound textures, as heard on Wading in the Afterlife (2022).

The reverberating synths of Together, Laurila's debut album, present "glimmers of what is to come" according to Frederick Bloy, while Dreamland features what Caceres called "unrecognizable reworkings of pop ballads and synth-lathered cascades." Disembodiment (2014) has a polarizing nature within Telepath's discography similar to that seen upon release in Radiohead's Kid A (2000), as it departs from his earlier sound by combining it with influences from broken transmission, another vaporwave subgenre. Face to Face, according to Downer, is a "dreamy vapor slush" work which evokes emotions of melancholy and warmness. By featuring one of the longest tracks within Telepath's discography, the 56-minute-long "Your Love, Forever", Laurila serves what Downer called "a slowcore endurance test." The saxophone instrumentation of "Cyan Water Surface" presents a smooth jazz influence, while "Tonight, My Love" emphasizes vaporwave's signature bass vocal sound as a vehicle for expressing emotion. Amaterasu demonstrates Laurila's method of manipulating J-Pop samples; according to Angel Marcloid, it exemplifies his ability to merely complement the original work without changing its core style. The New Age influence on his music, according to Caceres, is most apparent with Andromeda, which "elucidates that early half-recalled memories like this inhabit a spiritual quality", while Bloy highlighted how the release remains "halfway between a yearning, nostalgic dream, and a wistful reality." "Live Forever", one of Telepath's tracks for the split album Virtual Phantasy 2097, was described by Cage Hashimoto as developing a middle ground between the chopped and screwed style of traditional vaporwave and the upbeat sound of future funk.

Your Love gives light to a more sensual nature, with tracks such as "I Just Want to Love You" leading into what Caceres described as "a more lustful space", while Love / Sorrow showcases an atmosphere of "dreampunk-infused drones." In Mysterious Lover, its title track gives way to "a tale being told in the pacing and transitions," according to Caceres, while Laurila would later stray away from vaporwave's nostalgic component with Antara Communication and direct the music towards a future utopia mood. Bloy highlighted Another Night Together as an example of every Laurila release from late 2014 to 2015 "[being] worth listening to", and noted how Interstellar Intercourse remains his most praised solo album. Of his 2025 releases, Dawn Arrives demonstrates an enhancement in the software programs and compositional techniques, and Another Day Has Passed in a World Without You presents "chime-like tones [...] building a sparkling, torrential blizzard of light," according to Bloy. The new age themes of The Truth Is Always Within You emphasize both the nostalgic and transcendental aspect, with Ted Davis of Bandcamp Daily stating that its nine tracks are "as indebted to flashbacks as they are existential liminality", while Bloy felt it conveyed alien themes instead, "like a being from another place and era trying to learn 'human-music' in real-time. A Quiet Yet All-Pervasive Love is structured similarly to Another Night Together, as it features two long tracks of the same length; their looping lyrics, featuring refrains of "don't ever leave me" and "dreaming" respectively, were described by Bloy as representing "torrential tears of a headspace and monologue that are in agony" at first, leading to the second track's "resolute acceptance, or delusion".

As Virtual Dream Plaza, Laurila used the string sections of sampled material for Underwater Dream, serving a "luxurious, almost orchestral groove" to Caceres. He theorized Inclination of Love served as the pseudonym's entry into mallsoft, evoking images of "a market in the early morning, wedged in some minimalist Hong Kong district along the coast." Dream Love, which he called a "standout" from the project, presents an instruction manual with Laurila's "concepts of body-spirit realignment", while The Gaze of Eternal Love brings a tribal ambient influence to the forefront. Of Love at First Sight, one of the Mandarin-titled Virtual Dream Plaza releases, Caceres interpreted its sound as "phas[ing] in and out of this aroma of longing," and reported "tearing up multiple times" while listening to Endless Desire, which was called the pinnacle of the project by Bloy.

Birth of a New Day established a more accesible side of his music with cyberfuturistic, dystopian and metropolitan themes, combined with Russo's influence of Hong Kong director Wong Kar-wai's films, and its opening track "Recovery" features drones and sirens. By contrast, The Path to Lost Eden creates a jungle-inspired style and aesthetic more similar to his other work. Of this difference, Russo wrote: "It's not necessarily the style of the music that links the albums together, but the idea of taking the same concepts and being able to put them into different worlds." Fact Magazine stated that The Path to Lost Eden "charts the journey laid out in the title;" while Nmesh's side creates said "path", Telepath's side represents the "lost Eden" itself. According to Andrew Ryce, Laurila's side presents "long, hypnotic pieces," in contrast to Nmesh's "grand and filmic" sound. "Glowing Eyes" features lo-fi basslines and reverberated keyboard notes that exemplify this divergence. "Heart Synthesis" and "Surface Tension", however, return to a less melodic, more atmospheric sound characteristic of Telepath's discography, with the former featuring distant ambient vocals during its runtime. In Beyond Love, Laurila and Cardinal's material is "particularly dream-inducing yet beat-focused" according to Flagpole's Gordon Lamb, and the duo presents "spellbinding music" according to Simon Chandler.

All for You's two tracks feature what Tiny Mix Tapes called "slappy bass" and "sugary keys". According to Tim Burgess, it evokes a futuristic and uplifting sound that he compared to the style of rock band New Order. Rain Temple emphasizes ideas of what Miles Bowe called a "noirish" atmosphere, while Simon Chandler wrote of its "transcendent" value as creating a kind of "disembodied vaporwave". Of Televape's Eternity, Chandler said its "blissfully hypnagogic" music highlights an aura of mystery that is reflected by the record's "trippy" music video. He compared Telepath's A to HKE's album HK, due to both emphasizing atmospheric traits over musical structure, but contrasted Russo's dark and ominous sound to Laurila's "near-heavenly ambiance." The Light of Our Love, as abstractly described by Tiny Mix Tapes, "stirs the cauldron of our intimate life," with tracks that evoke senses of weightlessness, tranquility, happiness, and tension. Building a Better World again guides the musical style of Laurila and Elzinga toward an ambient-focused sound. The fifth track, "The End of the World", was described by Ari Delaney as invoking "analog bells underscored by gentle, whispering background features." The title track features "a bright melodic atmosphere" of "subtle pad sweeps" and synths, which Delaney felt created "the perfect soundtrack for a neon metropolis."

== Selected discography ==
Adapted from Bandcamp.

2013

- Together (と共に, To tomo ni)
- Look (目付き, Metsuki)
- Forever (末永く, Suenagaku)
- Nightlife (夜遊び, Yoasobi) with Silver Richards

2014

- To the Future (未来へ, Mirai e)
- Interstellar Love with Vincent Remember
- Dreamland (夢の国, Yume no kuni)
- Gateway (ゲートウェイ, Gētou~ei)
- Telepathic (テレパシーの, Terepashī no) with Cat System Corp.
- Blue Dream with Cat System Corp.
- Beyond Reality (現実を超えて, Genjitsu o koete)
- This Past Future (この過去の未来, Kono kako no mirai)
- Disembodiment (肉体からの離脱, Nikutai kara no ridatsu)
- Face to Face (向かい合って, Mukaiatte)
- Amaterasu (アマテラス)
- Andromeda (アンドロメダ)

2015

- Your Love (あなたの愛, Anata no ai)
- Antara Communication (アンタラ通信, Antaratsūshin)
- Eternal Love (永遠の愛, Eien no ai)
- Virtual Phantasy 2097 with Golden Living Room
- Faith (信仰, Shinkō)
- Disconnection (断線, Dansen)
- The Path to Lost Eden (ロストエデンへのパス, Rosutoeden e no pasu) with Nmesh
- Another Night Together (一緒に別の夜, Issho ni betsu no yoru)
- Gateway Ascension (アセンション, Asenshon) with HKE
- Interstellar Intercourse (星間性交, Seikan seikō)

2016

- All for You
- Clandestine Love Exchange
- Secret Lover
- A

2019

- Building a Better World with Cat System Corp.
- Flora Miranda's LaLaLand Fashion Show (Original Soundtrack)

2025

- Dawn Arrives (夜明けが訪れる, Yoake ga otozureru)
- Another Day Has Passed in a World Without You (君のいない世界でまた一日が過ぎた, Kimi no inai sekai de mata tsuitachi ga sugita)
- The Truth Is Always Within You (真実はいつもあなたの中にある, Shinjitsu wa itsumo anata no naka ni aru)
- Come, You Have Separated Me From All Things and Left Me Alone in This World (来たれあなたは私をすべてのものから遠ざけこの世界で一人にした, Kitare anata wa watashi o subete no mono kara tōzake kono sekai de hitori ni shita)
- A Quiet Yet All-Pervasive Love (静かなのにすべてを貫く愛, Shizukananoni subete o tsuranuku ai)

2026

- Sending My Love Upon a Shining Star (輝く星にのせて愛を, Kagayaku hoshi ni nosete ai o)
- If Time Is the Only Thing Separating Us, Then Nothing Is Separating Us at All (時が我らを隔てる唯一のものであるならば、隔てるものなど何もない, Toki ga warera o hedateru yuiitsu no mono de aru naraba, hedateru mono nado nani mo nai)
- Like a Flower Waiting for a Butterfly (蝶を待つ花のように, Chō o matsu hananoyōni)

== See also ==
- 1980s in Japan
