= Rain Temple =

Studio album by 2814
- Released: July 26, 2016
- Recorded: 2016
- Genres: Electronic; ambient; cyberpunk; downtempo; dreampunk; experimental; vaporwave
- Length: 65:52
- Label: Dream Catalogue
- Producers: t e l e p a t h テレパシー能力者; HKE

2814 chronology
Birth of a New Day (2015)	Rain Temple (2016)	Lost Fragments (2019)

Professional ratings
Review scores
Source	Rating
Resident Advisor	3.8/5

Rain Temple is the third studio album by English-American electronic music duo of dreampunk musicians Hong Kong Express (also known as HKE) and Telepath (stylized as t e l e p a t h テレパシー能力者), both collaborating under the alias 2814, released on July 26, 2016, by their record label Dream Catalogue.

== Background ==
In his review of the album, Sean O'Neal from The A.V. Club states that before Rain Temple, vaporwave felt like an "exhausting inside joke before it even started," adding that since the genre had been split into a multitude of subgenres, it was difficult to know "how seriously" they were to be taken, if they were serious at all. Outside of the general vaporwave community, the genre was mostly treated as a "dead" joke or meme, partly because of how some critics felt the genre was too "easy" to produce, but mainly for the genre's popularization after the release of Vektroid's Floral Shoppe, which besides presenting nearly all core vaporwave elements, became almost synonymous with the term "vaporwave" after the release of the Digg video titled "The Most Satisfying Video in the World", which presented the second track of the album.

2814 broke into the vaporwave scene with their second studio album Birth of a New Day in 2015. HKE later expressed satisfaction with the album, stating that, although the duo did not plan on producing another album under the alias 2814 after Birth of a New Day, the album had received such a huge amount of positive reactions that HKE wanted to release more music under the alias since it was, in his own words, functioning perfectly for both producers.

Prior to the album's release, Telepath was already established in the vaporwave community as one of the most prolific and prominent figures in the scene, being considered as the best producer of the genre by HKE himself.

== Musical style, writing, and composition ==
In an interview with the website Neon Dystopia, HKE compares both Birth of a New Day and Rain Temple, stating that, although Birth of a New Day is the greatest album he was ever involved in, Rain Temple is, in his opinion, much more involving, dramatic, and cinematic, adding that the initial plan was to not make a "Birth of a New Day pt. 2," which Rain Temple "certainly didn’t end up being." In this interview, he further demonstrated the thoughts and emotions that motivate him and Telepath to continue the 2814 project, which are, in his own words, "life, the universe, the dreams, and the entities beyond our perception." On an interview for Bandcamp Daily, HKE revealed that he wanted to produce an album about "a sacred place away from our current reality... a reality we can’t perceive with our limited senses."

O'Neal states that it is unclear whether Rain Temple may be classified as vaporwave, an uncertainty caused by the rigorous definitions applied by artists such as James Ferraro or Saint Pepsi. HKE himself does not classify it as vaporwave, but instead as "dream music"; in an interview with Tiny Mix Tapes, HKE states that it's better not to worry about what exactly is vaporwave as it is of little importance in his opinion, adding that vaporwave isn't a music genre but rather an artistic concept that can be evoked within music. He further points out he likes to call his music "dream music" simply because it is an easier term to make sense of.

"Eyes Of The Temple" presents a sudden precipitation ambient noise in its beginning and is mentioned by O'Neal as the standout track, being depicted by him as sounding like the soundtrack for a sci-fi movie that is "just waiting to happen." "Lost In A Dream" features vocals performed by singer MXXA, this track and "Contact" have been compared by O'Neal to the gothic dream pop sound found in the discography of artists such as This Mortal Coil and Cocteau Twins. "Guided By Love" features instrumentals inspired by post-rock artists, and "This Body" presents a strong influence from Balam Acab.

== Recording and production ==
Rain Temple was produced by vaporwave musicians HKE and Telepath, both collaborating under the alias 2814.

In a 2015 interview with C Monster, a writer from the website Tiny Mix Tapes, HKE described the production process for the 2814 alias in detail, stating that either Telepath or him would start producing a track, "flesh out" ideas between the two, and then send it over the other. Then they'd "send it back and forth" until the track was fully constructed and they were satisfied with it, ending up with one of them finishing the mastering process. Then they'd "put it in the pile ready for album consideration." HKE praises this form of musical collaboration, stating that this process is generally "as 50/50 as you can get with collaborative work." He further stated that although a specific track's style might suggest who was the one with most impact on the production of that specific track, the production process is overall very balanced. He noted that producing music with Telepath was one of the greatest collaborating experiences he'd ever had, to the point where he was "so excited" after finishing the mastering process of a track for a new release that he had dropped his new laptop on the ground and broke the screen.

Rain Temple was not produced with samples. In an interview with Christopher Towlyn from the website Neon Dystopia, HKE revealed that he used a program called Reason, a digital audio workstation for creating and editing music and audio, to produce Rain Temple, which made the musical collaboration easier than what would be normally expected as both musicians have a "firm understanding" of the software and generally make music in similar ways, which also facilitated the production process. Although HKE noted that he has produced music with various different musicians over his career, he again stated that working with Telepath is one of the most enjoyable experiences one can have while producing a music collaboration project.

== Track listing ==
No.	Title	Length
1.	"Before the Rain"	7:13
2.	"Eyes of the Temple"	11:15
3.	"Lost in a Dream"	7:04
4.	"Guided by Love"	6:00
5.	"Transference"	7:56
6.	"This Body"	10:04
7.	"Contact"	8:14
8.	"Inside the Sphere"	8:06
Total length:		65:52
