= Macross 82-99 =

Mexican vaporwave musician

- Origin: Mexico City
- Genres: future funk, vaporwave, jersey club, electronic music
- Occupations: producer, DJ, record label owner
- Instruments: Ableton Live, Reason, sampler, drum machine, guitar
- Years active: 2013–present
- Labels: Fortune 500, KEATS//COLLECTIVE, Business Casual, AMDISCS, DaFuture, Neoncity Records
- Member of: Sailor Team

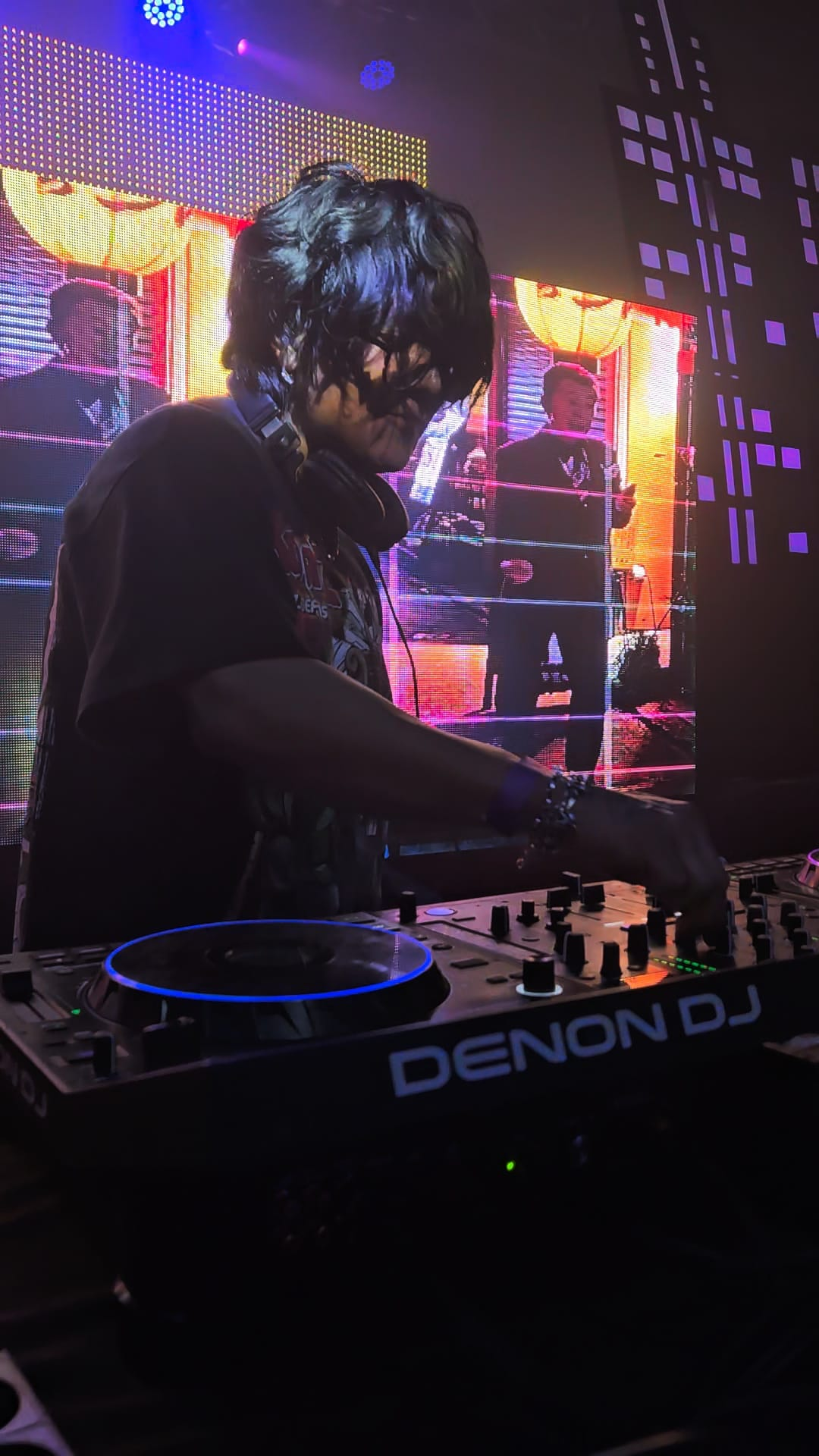
Macross 82-99 DJing at the Atomic Pixel Party in Barcelona in 2025.

Macross 82-99 (stylized as マクロス MACROSS 82-99 or MACROXX 82-99) is a Mexican electronic music producer and DJ from Mexico City.

== Musical style ==
His music combines elements of plunderphonics, disco, jazz fusion, house, hip hop and city pop, and commonly uses video games, Japanese pop culture, and 80s and 90s anime, most notably Sailor Moon, as aesthetic tropes. Macross 82-99's 2013 albums ネオ東京 (English: Neo Tokyo) and SAILORWAVE, along with musical cohort Saint Pepsi's Hit Vibes, are commonly cited as the origin point for the "future funk" subgenre of vaporwave, which combines the sample-based production approach and visual language of vaporwave with French house and dance music influences.

The "82-99" in the artist's stage name refers to Super Dimension Fortress Macross. The anime, which sonically and visually inspired the project, was broadcast in 1982 while the show's story takes place in the year 1999.

== Career ==
Macross 82-99's music has been described as, "where J-pop and disco samples meet ambient atmospheres and vaporwave aesthetics." He has collaborated with artists such as Yung Bae, Sarah Midori Perry, and Ranma ½ composer Hideharu Mori. Macross 82-99's track "Fun Tonight", a remix of Armenta's 1983 record "I Wanna Be With You", has over 20 million streams on Spotify.

Prior to its deletion from the YouTube channel Artzie Music, "Fun Tonight" had over 10 million views across multiple uploads on the platform. As a member of Sailor Team, a music collective of future funk and French house producers, Macross 82-99 has toured across Asia and North America.

== Music Distribution ==
With the exception of 2013's [夏日], which had a limited run split album cassette release with Architecture in Tokyo's Summer Paradise on the Business Casual label, all early singles and projects were available exclusively to stream and as digital downloads on free and pay-what-you-want music sites like SoundCloud and Bandcamp, along with video uploads on YouTube.

However, since 2017, with the re-release of A Million Miles Away on cassette tape, Hong Kong based music label Neoncity Records has released multiple Macross 82-99 albums physically on limited run cassette, vinyl, and CD, influenced by the vinyl record revival of the 2010s and with a desire to bring vaporwave cassette culture over to the future funk scene. Label founder and owner Davy Law expressed that the success of this release is what convinced him to pursue his label as a legitimate business.

== Discography ==
Albums
Release year	Title	Label	Contributing Artists
2013	ネオ東京	KEATS//COLLECTIVE Neoncity Records	PROUX, SOUL BELLS, Lé Real 現実
2013	SAILORWAVE	Fortune 500 Neoncity Records	Dinosaurus Rex, Saint Pepsi
2014	A Million Miles Away	Neoncity Records	Sarah Bonito, Soul Bells, Beat Poems, Rollergirl, mothica, Lancaster, Andrew Walker (album artwork)
2015	CHAM!	Neoncity Records	Kokayna, Timid Soul, Diana Shroomy, Libano, Strider Kun, ローマンRoman, Andrew Walker (album artwork)
2017	アイドル、さくら Idols, Sakura	Self-released	Lotus Cloud, Lé Real, Night Tempo, Punipunidenki, Fancy Sedated, Samsi, Chieko
2017	Sailorwave II	Neoncity Records	Kamei, Punipunidenki, Lé Real, Desired, Aritus, Night Tempo, Yung Abe, UPPER (mastering), Davy Law (album artwork)
2018	Nakatomi Tower ( A Xmas Album )	Self-released	
2020	Shibuya Meltdown	Neoncity Records	TORIENA, SHUUU, Vantage, Puniden
2022	Sailorwave III	Neoncity Records	Neon Vectors, Chieko, Emi Aramaki, Vantage

Singles & EPs
Release year	Title	Label	Contributing Artists
2013	"R E F R E S H I N G [マクロスMACROSS 82-99 REBOOT]"	Self-released	Infinity Frequencies
2013	[夏日]	Business Casual 87'	
2013	"CITY"	Artzie Music	Architecture in Tokyo
2014	"私は愛に ハイです - Yung Bae [マクロス 82-99 Edit]"	Self-released	Yung Bae
2014	"Selfish High Heels"	Neoncity Records	Yung Bae, Harrison
2015	"セーラーチーム"	Self-released	Kitty, RyeRye
2016	Jutsu EP	Self-released	コンシャスTHOUGHTS
2016	"If I Ran Into You"	DaFuture	Yung Abe
2017	"It's Own Way (MACROSS 82-99 Remix)"	Self-released	Yung Abe, CrClub, Chieko, Crisalys (album artwork)
2017	"Your Body (MACROSS 82-99 Remix)"	Self-released	Chieko, Crisalys (album artwork)
2017	"City Pop"	Self-released	Lé Real
2017	"Sakura"	Self-released	Punipunidenki, Lé Real
2017	"Aogashima Island !"	Self-released	Crisalys (album artwork)
2018	"Fresh !"	Self-released	Flamingosis
2018	Summer Touch	Neoncity Records	Flamingosis, Morning, Neon Vectors, R4wone (mastering)
2018	"Brighter Days"	Self-released	O D I (album artwork)
2019	"Pixel Bomb"	Self-released	
2019	"Pocari Lips"	Self-released	
2019	"Party !"	Self-released	SHUUU
2020	Sendagi Collection	Neoncity Records	Vantage
2020	"Plástico Amor"	Self-released	AnnieK
2020	"Night Ride (Macross 82-99 Remix)"	Neoncity Records	Emi Aramaki
2020	"Love 4 You"	Neoncity Records	
2022	"Two of a Kind"	Self-released	Neon Vectors
2021	"Konnichiwa"	Self-released	
2022	"Dance Tonite"	Self-released	Neon Vectors
2023	CLUB 84	Neoncity Records	Neon Vectors, Vantage

Compilations
Release year	Title	Label	Contributing Artists
2014	Summer Paradise / [夏日]	Business Casual	architecture in tokyo
2018	Sailor Team Hits!	Neoncity Records	Night Tempo, Nanidato, Desired
2019	Otaku Spirit Sessions	Not on label	Yasutaka Mizunaga, Fumitaka Anzai, Hideharu Mori, Mimi Izumi Kobayashi, Night Tempo, Desired, Tanuki

Mixes
Year	Title	Label
2014	MIX 4 AMDISCS	AMDISCS
2017	Live ! As played in Monterrey 2017	Self-released

== See also ==
- Skylar Spence
- Yung Bae
- Vaporwave
- French house
- Remix culture
- City Pop
