= Business Casual =

Business Casual may refer to:

- Business casual, a dress code
- Business Casual (Beep Beep album), 2004
- Business Casual (Chromeo album), 2010
- Business Casual (EP), an EP by We Are Scientists, 2013
- Business Casual (record label), an independent Vaporwave record label
