= Birth of a New Day =

2015 studio album by 2814

- Default cover art

Studio album by 2814
- Released: January 21, 2015
- Recorded: 2014
- Genres: Ambient; dreampunk; downtempo; post-vaporwave; vaporwave
- Length: 67:25
- Languages: Japanese, Chinese
- Label: Dream Catalogue
- Producers: David Russo; Luke Laurila

2814 chronology
2814 (2014)	Birth of a New Day (2015)	Rain Temple (2016)

Alternative cover
- The first frame of the animated cover art

Birth of a New Day (Japanese: 新しい日の誕生, romanized: Atarashī Hi no Tanjō) is the second studio album by English-American electronic music duo 2814, released on January 21, 2015 by Dream Catalogue. With the popularity of vaporwave in the early to mid-2010s, producers David Russo and Luke Laurila experimented with the genre by not using any form of samples to compose the album, which portrays a futuristic East Asian metropolis inspired by cities such as Hong Kong and Tokyo. 2814 produced the record through a back-and-forth process, with either one of them finishing the mastering process, and its artwork was created by Argentinian visual designer Gustavo Torres under the alias Kidmograph. The album drew comparisons to the works of musicians Oneohtrix Point Never and Kavinsky, while its production was influenced by ambient artists including Boards of Canada and the films of Hong Kong director Wong Kar-Wai.

Initially launched on CD only, Birth of a New Day was later repressed on vinyl and cassette with help from an Indiegogo campaign. The album was praised by critics for its immersive soundscape and the combination of each artist's style. It was the breakthrough album of Dream Catalogue and also the first physical release of the label; it is one of the most popular releases associated with the vaporwave genre, as well as one of the most positively received. The record is described as a "cult classic" by an AllMusic editor and as a catalyst of the dreampunk genre by the duo.

== Background ==
In 2014, English electronic musician David Russo adopted the pseudonym Hong Kong Express, under which he released several dreampunk albums that conveyed the ambience of East Asian metropolitan cities such as Hong Kong and Tokyo. He was inspired by the films of Hong Kong director Wong Kar-Wai, such as Chungking Express (1994), Fallen Angels (1995) and In the Mood for Love (2000), and was drawn to vaporwave's concepts of nostalgia, futurism, mystery, surrealism, nostalgia and what he called Pavlovian visuals. Russo's first records, such as 2047 (2014), presented his music in a more lo-fi way, with little to no mastering applied. He felt musicians Luxury Elite and Burial already perfectly explored American and British cityscapes in their music respectively, and was more influenced by the metropolitan culture of Hong Kong in his own work, despite never having travelled to Asia himself. By the end of 2014, his third album HK saw the Hong Kong Express alias gaining a wider popularity, and was described by Russo as his favorite release from the project for being completely sample-free. Describing it as his most similar solo album to Birth of a New Day, Russo stated it has a much more minimal approach, and presents a more subtle and melancholic tone.

Telepath, the pseudonym of American vaporwave musician Luke Laurila, was previously known for his work using samples of pop ballads to develop the slushwave subgenre; in 2025, he said the first "definitive" slushwave work ever created was "Betrayal" (裏切り, Uragiri), a track from the 2013 split album Nightlife with musician Silver Richards. His albums explored themes such as nostalgia, spirituality and romance, as heard in his 2014 release Dreamland (夢の国, Yume no kuni). He was considered the greatest vaporwave artist by Russo himself, who already listened to his music since at least 2014, and later added him as a co-owner of Dream Catalogue, his record label.

Russo and Laurila eventually met on the music streaming platform SoundCloud, and Laurila released Interstellar Love (2013), his split album with musician Vincent Remember, on Dream Catalogue. Laurila had also collaborated with Russo on the four-hour-long collaborative project Fragmented Memories (2014), where some tracks were already credited to the 2814 alias, and released the pseudonym's self-titled debut album in 2014 with the stated goal of creating a sample-free vaporwave album. Russo stated that Birth of a New Day would refine the strengths of their debut, as both he and Laurila felt they "have topped the first". Despite highlighting the album as 2814's last release, Russo later collaborated with Laurila under the alias again in 2016's Rain Temple.

== Music and themes ==
In the words of Russo, Birth of a New Day is an album meant to "have a strong sense of place" and create a futuristic world that is open to interpretation, exploring genres such as ambient, dreampunk, downtempo and vaporwave. Simon Chandler of Bandcamp Daily felt the album brought a chillwave influence with its "spellbinding ambiance", while Beats Per Minute's John Wohlmacher described its futurustic, utopian mood as an adaptation of Burial's style. Its slow-paced tracks also drew comparisons to 1982 film Blade Runner; Paul Simpson of AllMusic said the album approached the style of the film's score and ambient techno from the 1990s in its "more spiritual, emotionally intense" results, instead of vaporwave's Muzak influence, while Tristan Bath of The Quietus likened its sound effects of public transportation, rain and reverberation to the film's "rainy, neon-lit culture clash". Rolling Stone's Christopher R. Weingarten recommended the record for fans of Boards of Canada, Oneohtrix Point Never and Kavinsky, while AllMusic found it similar to the works of English musician Patten.

"Shinjuku Golden Street" (新宿ゴールデン街, Shinjuku gōruden-gai)

"Sorrow" (悲哀, Hiai)

The opening track of Birth of a New Day, "Recovery", introduces the album's dreamlike sound with elements such as drones, pads, police sirens and shimmering piano melodies, and samples dialogue from the Wong Kar-wai film 2046 (2004). Russo later said of "Recovery": "It's about reliving the same story in another time and space … again and again. Not so much reincarnation but the endless cycle of the universe as it expands and contracts forever, time repeating itself." Andrew Ryce of Resident Advisor compared the track's progression to the loops found in the works of American musician William Basinski, while Joe Price of Complex described its "transportative" sound as akin to "looking out a hotel room window as rain pours".

The childlike lullaby of "Distant Lovers" is played alongside field recordings of a subway system, public address announcements and traffic, likened by Igloo Magazine's James Knapman to the soundtracks of Vangelis, while "Shinjuku Golden Street" and "Sorrow" give the album a haunted flavor with their spiraling sound. The Junoesque "True Love", according to Knapman, brings to light childhood memories, with its soundscape of thunder and rain accompanying warm bass pulses evoking the atmosphere of In the Mood for Love, and Vice staff called the track "beyond-blissful". "Telepathy" uses phasers and a larger portion of the 2046 sample featured on "Recovery", before "Birth of a New Day" closes the album with the sounds of waterfall, steam and thunder.

== Production ==
Birth of a New Day was one of the first vaporwave albums not to sample other pieces of music as a production technique. While recognizing sampling as a "legitimate" technique, Russo had previously expressed his and Laurila's desire to produce an album that could not be classified as plunderphonics, mentioning he actually dislikes the genre name, and said they wanted to show how vaporwave could be created in an original way rather than relying on muzak and jazz. He disliked the notion of the genre being resumed to slowed-down reverberated samples, "badly photoshopped" Greek sculptures, retro video game consoles and kanji, and with the album, attempted to develop the genre further, which he thought turned out "somewhat successful". The album's production was influenced on Russo's side by musicians such as Steve Roach, Vangelis, Burial and Sigur Rós, and by Boards of Canada on Laurila's side.

During production, either Russo or Laurila would start creating a track and then "send it back and forth" via e-mail until the track was fully constructed, ending up with one of them finishing the mastering process. While saying it was "as 50/50 as you can get with collaborative work", Russo said the style of some tracks does suggest who had the most impact on its production. He praised his collaborative experience with Laurila, and reported accidentally breaking the screen of his laptop once out of excitement. Russo later clarified that he and Laurila used the music software Reason to produce Birth of a New Day.

== Artwork ==
"Dreampunk is all about this vast city and dystopia where you feel alone even though you are surrounded by people. [...] It's not exactly nostalgic, but it encompasses the feeling of remembering moments in life. It's like you are trying to recover a specific moment, an inner search or sorts. We wanted to translate that into the artwork."

— Gustavo Torres

Birth of a New Day features artwork by Argentinian visual artist Gustavo Torres, credited under the alias Kidmograph. Torres already knew of 2814 and called himself a "big fan" of the duo, who contacted him through his Tumblr account in 2012. He created the artwork on Cinema 4D, as well as "probably" plugins from 3D resource platform Greyscalegorilla and Adobe PhotoShop. He was previously known for having worked with musical groups such as the Low Pros and Maroon 5, with Russo calling him "pretty talented". Over the following years, the artwork would be featured in several vaporwave and dreampunk playlists on YouTube, which Torres saw as a sign that it "really resonated with people".

In 2021, Torres launched a series of new looping GIFs relating to the album's cyberpunk themes as non-fungible tokens on Nifty Gateway Studio. Created with 3D rendering engine Redshift, he said the new visual pieces fit with the rest of his portfolio, which mostly consisted of GIFs.

== Release and promotion ==
Birth of a New Day was released Dream Catalogue on January 21, 2015. A limited-edition batch of 50 CD-Rs was released along with the digital release of the album, being the first physical release of the label; although Dream Catalogue had previously released cassettes, they were in conjunction with smaller labels who worked on the physical side, while Dream Catalogue worked on the digital side. Russo decided to introduce the CD format to vaporwave, as it was a format he cherished growing up and a realization of a childhood dream of his.

2814 launched a campaign in November 2015 via Indiegogo in order to press the album on vinyl: 214 backers surpassed its goal within a month and it ended up 161% funded. They were able to press 1,000 copies of 2xLP 180-gram vinyl and, with the help of Bleep/Warp, ship them out to buyers worldwide. Backers of the campaign were also able to choose a perk that included a reissue of the original cassette release, limited to 50 copies. Both the cassette and vinyl releases included a bonus track, titled "Aftermath." Finally, the album was repressed on cassette in 2016 by the Not Not Fun Records label, limited to 80 copies. "Aftermath" was later made digitally available in a mixtape released by Russo on website Boiler Room.

A screenshot from the "Recovery" music video, presenting an apparently confused woman.

The music video for "Distant Lovers" debuted on February 27, 2016, on Dream Catalogue's official YouTube channel, serving as a demo of the track. The video shows multiple modified ambiances of the 2013 video game Grand Theft Auto V (2013). The "Recovery" music video, now featuring the track in full, premiered on Dream Catalogue's channel on August 20, 2016. It presents an Asian woman lying in bed and getting up suddenly, followed by short clips of her in a hurry to take the subway. When entering she sits, closes her eyes and sleeps before the video cuts out to other people in the subway. After sleeping, she gets out of the subway and goes home, followed by a clip of her watching the panoramic view of the city at sunset through the window.

== Critical reception ==
Professional ratings
Review scores
Source	Rating
Resident Advisor	3.1/5
Tiny Mix Tapes	4/5

Upon release, Birth of a New Day was received positively by professional critics. The Rolling Stone magazine reacted positively to the album, saying that the opening track is "a dreamy, gorgeous cascade of deep drone, cascading piano and distant sirens", while Adam Harper of The Fader noted it as some of the "best vaporwave", as it "offers a brilliant nocturnal chillout". Calling it one of the most powerful ambient releases, Tristan Bath from The Quietus compared its most melancholic moments to DJ Shadow's Endtroducing..... and praised the combination of Laurila and Russo's musical styles, which was "perfect", adding that the album offers "years of peaceful healing to everybody who gives it a listen".

Resident Advisor contributor Andrew Ryce presented mixed feelings on Birth of a New Day, as despite describing it as mature and praising its "vivid ambient landscapes", it still felt inconsistent to him, "alternately brilliant and sloppy, emotionally resonant at one moment and hollow the next". Comparing the album to William Basinski's The Disintegration Loops, he said the album still felt sample-based and overly reliant on vaporwave clichés, such as purple neon and Asian language. In 2018, he wrote of the release again by highlighting its "gorgeous ambient" sound. Music website Tiny Mix Tapes described Birth of a New Day as 2814 "swarm[ing] within riddled baselines dubbed to the suds circling the shower drain, draining the last bits of filth into a pipe that leads to a different story all together", while Igloo Magazine called it a "glittering jewel" of the vaporwave genre.

== Legacy ==
Birth of a New Day popularized the Dream Catalogue Label and the vaporwave genre as a whole, as it contains "the entrancing parts of vaporwave, but condensed into a distinctly cohesive artform that also embraces past musical innovators like Boards of Canada, Burial and Sigur Rós" according to Bandwagon. Tristan Bath said the album "dodged" what he called a side effect of the prolific nature of vaporwave, where "the odd masterpiece can disappear into the abyss having only reached the eardrums of a mere handful of ravenous vapor-heads." In November 2015, Rolling Stone noted that the album had become "an unparalleled success within a small, passionate pocket of the Internet" and "a staple of the Bandcamp charts".

David Russo highlighted Birth of a New Day as the definitive Dream Catalogue release, saying that it "helped define the label, and what the guiding vision of the label should be", and called it "a teenage dream come true," while American musician Michael Nesmith of the Monkees listed it as one of his reasons for loving the vaporwave genre, as it "[is] completely gone from the landscapes of traditional music." According to Paul Simpson, an AllMusic writer, almost immediately after its release, the album's "dreamy atmospherics and nostalgic melodies struck a chord with listeners, and it became an instant cult classic". After the album's release, the Vice magazine named the duo as "vaporwave superstars", stating that in the scene, 2814 is "as good as it gets".

== Track listing ==
Adapted from CD release. English translations adapted from the 2019 reissue.

No.	Title	Length
1.	"Recovery" (恢复, Huīfù)	5:51
2.	"Distant Lovers" (遠くの愛好家, Tōku no aikō-ka)	6:18
3.	"Shinjuku Golden Street" (新宿ゴールデン街, Shinjuku gōruden-gai)	8:51
4.	"Drifting" (ふわっと, Fuwatto)	6:36
5.	"Sorrow" (悲哀, Hiai)	9:23
6.	"True Love" (真実の恋, Shinjitsu no koi)	7:12
7.	"Telepathy" (テレパシー, Terepashī)	10:08
8.	"Birth of a New Day" (新しい日の誕生, Atarashī hi no tanjō)	13:04
Total length:		67:23

Vinyl and cassette edition bonus track
No.	Title	Length
9.	"Aftermath" (余波, Yoha)	5:30
Total length:		72:53

== Personnel ==
Credits adapted from the 2019 reissue.

- David Russo – producer
- Luke Laurila – producer
- Gustavo Torres – artwork
- Alex Zou – photography director (track 1)
- David Koh – photography director (track 1)
- Autumn Lew – photography director (track 1)
- NVLLVS – music video creator (track 2)
- Anise Mariko – music video director (track 1)

== See also ==
- Cyberpunk 2077
