= Prom King (album) =

Studio album by Skylar Spence
- Released: September 18, 2015
- Studio: Home studio
- Genre: Pop; dance
- Length: 40:35
- Label: Carpark Records

Singles from Prom King
- 1. "Fiona Coyne" Released: August 12, 2014; 2. "Can't You See" Released: June 16, 2015; 3. "Affairs" Released: July 27, 2015; 4. "I Can't Be Your Superman" Released: September 2, 2015

Prom King is the debut album by Skylar Spence, a pseudonym of New York City-based electronic musician Ryan DeRobertis. The album was released on September 18, 2015 via Carpark Records.

DeRobertis started using the Skylar Spence name after copyright issues with his previous name, Saint Pepsi. Prom King was mostly recorded at home and four singles were released preceding the album. Prom King is a pop and dance album, marking a sonic departure for DeRobertis. In the album, DeRobertis sings and strays from the sampled vaporwave-like music he had created previously. The album received generally positive reviews from music critics, and placed on PopMatters' year-end best list for 2015. Common comments from critics were about the album's effervescence, its nostalgia, and its cohesiveness.

== Background and recording ==
Ryan DeRobertis previously created music as Saint Pepsi, but as he gained popularity, the name created legal trouble with PepsiCo. DeRobertis adopted the pseudonym Skylar Spence, after two characters from the 1996 film Everyone Says I Love You. As well, "Skylar Spence" is the title of a track from his 2013 Saint Pepsi album Hit Vibes.

Prom King was mostly recorded in DeRobertis' house, other than his vocals, which he recorded in his friend Alex's room. DeRobertis stated, "I would stress not to have a recording budget because I wanted to produce the whole thing [...] the way I’ve produced music for the past seven years". DeRobertis is the "prom king" in the album's title, because he had almost become a homecoming king in high school.

== Promotion ==
DeRobertis chose to sign to Carpark Records because they offered him creative freedom to sing. He released the single "Fiona Coyne" on August 12, 2014. He released a further three singles preceding the album: "Can't You See" on June 16, 2015; "Affairs" on July 27, 2015; and "I Can't Be Your Superman" on September 2, 2015. A remix of "Can't You See" by Ryan Hemsworth was released on August 26, 2015, and music videos were later released for all of the singles. DeRobertis went on tour in support of the album. The album was physically released on vinyl and CD, including a limited edition deluxe vinyl.

== Music ==
"Slowed some music down and called myself an artist"

— DeRobertis references his sample-based work on "Can't You See".

In contrast to DeRobertis' previous Saint Pepsi work, which had vaporwave and heavily-sampled elements, Prom King is a pop album in which DeRobertis' sings instead of only sampling vocals. As well, DeRobertis uses real instruments in a way that imitates sampling. DeRobertis stated, "with Prom King, I wanted to move away from [working from existing music]. 95 percent of the instrumentals were recorded by me".

Prom King is a pop and dance album, which takes inspiration from dance-pop, synth-pop, nu-disco, disco, and new wave. "Can’t You See" has elements of disco, dance, and funk, and its lyrics are written as told to DeRobertis' mirror reflection. According to Stereogum, the track is about "how narcissism can serve as a defense mechanism for anxiety". “I Can’t Be Your Superman” is a disco-funk song about victimization. The instrumental "Ridiculous!" was described by Stereogum as a "crush-pop banger". "Fall Harder" takes inspiration from sophisti-pop and dance club. The instrumental "Bounce Is Back" uses new wave-like synths, strings and sampled vocals. "Affairs" is a breakup song which takes inspiration from chillwave, synth-pop, sophisti-pop and dance club. "Cash Wednesday" uses new wave-like synths and sampled vocals. The closer "Fiona Coyne" is a sophisti-pop, bubblegum pop, and disco song whose title references Degrassi.

== Critical reception ==
Professional ratings
Review scores
Source	Rating
AllMusic	.
Pitchfork	7.0/10
No Ripcord	6/10
The Skinny	4/5 stars

Prom King has received generally positive reviews from music critics. All four scoring critics rated the album between 6/10 (or 3 stars) and 8/10 (or 4 stars). PopMatters placed the album 30th on their list of "The 80 Best Albums of 2015".

AllMusic and Vulture described the album as "effervescent", while No Ripcord described it as having a "youthful exuberance and bouncy sheen". Stereogum wrote, the album "feels like the best and brightest golden moments of summer". Similarly, No Ripcord described it as a "consistently fun summer album". According to Spectrum Culture, the album is "simply fun" and "some of the most engaging and unabashedly joyous dance music made in a long time".

Critics have commented on how the album uses nostalgia. According to Pitchfork, the album succeeds despite its "distanced, conceptual take on pop nostalgia". The Skinny wrote that the album uses nostalgia well, for example in "Can't You See", which "capitalise[s] upon nostalgia without losing any wit". According to Vulture, DeRobertis’s boyish voice adds to the nostalgia, giving the album "an endearing 'let’s make out under the bleachers during the homecoming game' quality". In contrast, No Ripcord, wrote that the album over-indulges in its nostalgia, and critiqued his boyish voice and the "attention-grabbing title". Spectrum Culture likened the album's nostalgia to how Daft Punk used disco in their 2013 album Random Access Memories.

As Prom King has both pop and sampled instrumental tracks, critics have discussed the album's cohesiveness. AllMusic described the pop songs as inconsistent, which sound like "remixes of other people". According to Pitchfork, the choice to not only feature pop songs makes the album more distinct, but sometimes over-indulgent. No Ripcord described the instrumental tracks as the album's weaker half due to them being dated and unmemorable. Spectrum Culture praised the album for being cohesive despite its genre variations, writing that the instrumental tracks "fit seamlessly into the album".

== Track listing ==
1. "Intro" — 2:10
2. "Can't You See" — 4:06
3. "Prom King" — 4:14
4. "I Can't Be Your Superman" — 4:20
5. "Ridiculous" — 3:34
6. "Fall Harder" — 4:45
7. "Bounce Is Back" — 3:30
8. "Affairs" — 4:21
9. "All I Want" — 3:00
10. "Cash Wednesday" — 2:30
11. "Fiona Coyne" — 4:09

== Personnel ==
Adapted from the album's liner notes.

- Ryan DeRobertis — music, vocals, and production
- Alexander Almgren — mixing and vocal engineering
- Rob Carmichael (of Seen Studios) — graphic design
