= Geometric Lullaby =

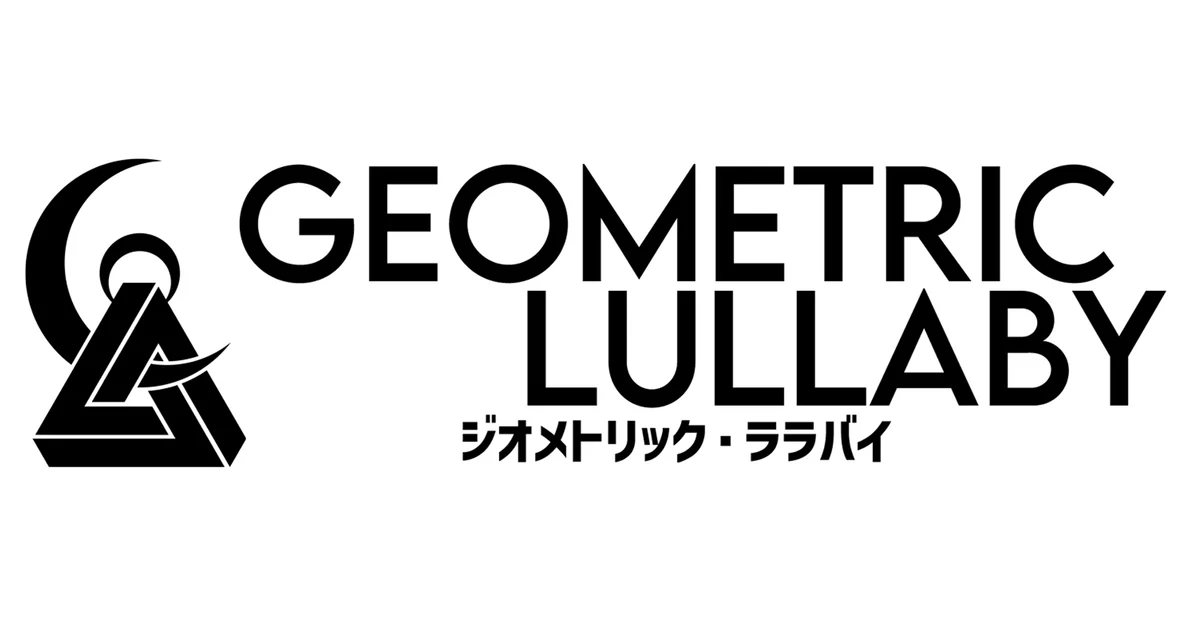
- Founded: 2018
- Founder: Dennis Mikula
- Distributor: Virgin Music Group
- Genre: Ambient, dark ambient, slushwave, vaporwave
- Country of origin: United States
- Location: Pittsburgh, Pennsylvania
- Official website: www.geometriclullaby.com

Geometric Lullaby is a Pittsburgh-based vaporwave independent record label founded in 2018 by musician Dennis Mikula, a member of black metal band Ghost Bath. The label released albums by artists such as Cat System Corp., Death's Dynamic Shroud, Desert Sand Feels Warm at Night, MindSpring Memories and Telepath テレパシー能力者, and is self-described as "a collection of songs about life and death".

== Artists ==
Adapted from Bandcamp, excluding side projects by Dennis Mikula.

- 18 Days
- 818181
- Abadon (アバドン)
- Aural
- Avion
- Bento Boy (便當boy, Biàndang)
- Cat System Corp.
- ClearVisionDream Productions
- Computer Dreams
- Cosmic Cycler
- Days of Blue
- Death Channel (死亡頻道, Sǐwáng píndào)
- Death's Dynamic Shroud
- Desert Sand Feels Warm at Night
- Disease
- Distorting Ion (歪めるIΘN, Yugameru aion)
- Droidroy
- EarthNet
- Electric Dreams
- Emba Soundsystem
- Emotional Trauma (stylized as "(´･ω･`)")
- Endlesswaters
- The Eternal Sleep of Christmas (聖誕節永恆的睡眠, Shèngdàn jié yǒnghéng de shuìmián)
- Ezhak
- Fiebertraum
- First Kings
- Gap (空隙, Kòngxì)
- Gateway
- A Gentle Breeze and Thick Fog (微风浓雾, Wéifēng nóng wù)
- Glaciology
- Gnuguskoed
- Gore
- Groceries
- Hallmark '87
- Hantasi
- Hazel Witch
- Heart (دل)
- Illusionary Dreaming (ドリーミング, Dorīmingu)
- Infinite Leisure
- Internet Club
- Kanal 8
- Kanalvier
- Kind Mr. S
- Light Blending In
- Lily of the Valley
- Live Media
- Lost Cascades
- Lucid Dream Catcher (明晰夢のキャッチャー, Meiseki yume no kyatchā)
- Mac Bandit
- Mezzaluna
- Midnight Television
- MindSpring Memories
- Mystery
- Nether
- Nmesh
- Nofriendsonline
- Origami Girl
- Passive Refraction
- Phantom Illusion 27 (p h a n t o m ファントム幻影 2 7, Fantomu gen'ei)
- PJS
- Polygon Dream
- Portal to Dreams (夢へのポータル, Yume e no pōtaru)
- Psicadence
- R23X
- Sangam
- Sewersvlt
- Skindance
- SkyTwoHigh
- Sorrow 1984
- Soviet Tango
- Sport 3000
- Suspicion and Distrust (疑心暗鬼, Gishin'angi)
- Telepath テレパシー能力者
- Temporal Loneliness (孤独, Gūdú)
- Towers
- Undefined
- Ursula's Cartridges
- Useless
- Valyri
- Virtual Dream Plaza
- W
- Weather Forecast (天気予報, Asutenki)
- Winterquilt
- The World Ended in the 80s (世界は80年代に終了しました, Sekai wa 80-nendai ni shūryō shimashita)
- You Still Feel Them Out There, Don't You
- Zer0 Rei (れい)
- Yodobashi Camera
