= Dream Catalogue =

British independent record label

- Founded: 2014
- Founder: David Russo
- Defunct: 2021
- Status: Inactive
- Distributor: Virgin Music Group
- Genre: Dreampunk, hardvapour, post-vaporwave, slushwave, vaporwave
- Country of origin: United Kingdom
- Location: London
- Official website: www.dreamcatalogue.com

Dream Catalogue is a London-based dreampunk record store and former independent record label, founded in 2014 by English electronic musician David Russo. The label was best known for the release of 2814's Birth of a New Day (2015), which featured production by Russo. It also released albums by artists such as Cat System Corp., Death's Dynamic Shroud, Luxury Elite, Telepath and Zomby, and described itself as "installing dreams into your brain".

== Artists ==
Adapted from Bandcamp, excluding David Russo's side projects. Only includes artists currently on the label, except where notable.

- 25midi
- 2814
- A Better Future for Us All
- Aut2m
- Birdbandboy
- Bryant Canelo
- Cacola
- Cat System Corp.
- Century
- Chungking Mansions
- Cocainejesus
- Computer Graphics
- CVLTVRE
- Cyber '98 (サイバー '98, Saibā'98)
- David Russo (HKE)
- DCT
- Dead Dream Vanity (死夢VANITY, Sǐ mèng)
- Death's Dynamic Shroud
- Diamondstein
- DJ Alina
- DJ Patrick Bateman
- DJ Ray-Xans
- DJ SUgar C
- Doc Weasel
- Dr. Nakano
- Droidroy
- Eightxnights
- The Editor
- Elegance of the Damned
- Equip
- Eulalie
- Ex Aquis
- Facechain
- Fentanyl Embrace
- Flash Kostivich
- Gateway
- Ghosting
- Ganz Feld
- Global
- Golden Living Room
- Goldface
- GreyscaleSound
- Grimório de Abril
- Grimwort
- Haircuts for Men
- Halo Acid
- Hantasi
- Hard K
- HCMJ
- Henry Moonchild
- Hex Limit
- Immune
- Inertia Eyes
- Jade Statues
- The Jewel Ship
- Kagami Smile
- Kobayashi Yamato
- Köshrimp
- Lamitina
- Laüst
- Lila Tirando a Violeta
- Lillith Twin
- Loretta Aberdeen
- Luca Venezia
- Luxury Elite
- May :3
- Memory Gateways
- Metagyndes
- The Microgram
- Mike Tenay
- Mod-Comm 81
- The Monarch
- Mutilomaquia
- Mykena
- Namaste_'95
- Nature
- NeonTropix
- New Shoppe
- NewEraDreaming
- Nmesh
- No Death
- One Winged Angel
- Passive Refraction
- Pixelord
- Pyravid
- Ra Light
- Remember
- Renja
- Rez
- Ross Khmil
- Ruf Dug
- Sangam
- Sephora Brain Vibes (SEPHORA脳バイブス, Nō baibusu)
- Shima33
- Shinatama
- Skeleton 2 (骨架的 2, Gǔjià de)
- Slime Mask
- Sofia
- Soltskval
- Somnus
- Steel Diamonds
- Taspo
- Telepath
- Telozkope
- The/End
- Tinmixer
- Toyohirakumin
- Vaperror
- VHS Tape Rewinder (VHSテープリワインダー, Tēpuriwaindā)
- Vince Dolphin
- Wuso
- Vincent Remember
- Virtual Dream Plaza
- Winter Sleep
- Winterquilt
- WosX
- Yoshimi
- The Wushimi Complex
- Zomby
