= Hardvapour =

Music genre

- Stylistic origins: Vaporwave; acid house; big beat; breakcore; broken beat; cyberpunk; dreampunk; drum and bass; gabber; hardbass; hardstyle; hardtechno; industrial techno; noise music; punk rock; speedcore; techno
- Cultural origins: 2015, cyberculture
- Typical instruments: Digital audio workstation; synthesizer; drum machine

Hardvapour is an Internet music-based microgenre of music that emerged in late 2015 as a tongue-in-cheek response to vaporwave, departing from the calm, muzak-sampling capitalist utopia concept of the latter in favor of a gabber- and punk-influenced sound. Canadian music producer Wolfenstein OS X album End of World Rave (2015) and the Antifur record label are credited with having first defined the hardvapour sound.

== Beginnings ==
On 29 November 2015, Canadian vaporwave producer Wolfenstein OS X (or WosX for short) released End of World Rave, the earliest notable hardvapour release, via the Bandcamp label Dream Catalogue. The album featured music that intentionally opposed aspects that were typically associated with the vaporwave sound. Todd Ledford, founder of the label HVRF Central Command explained:

In the Fall of 2015 Wolfenstein OS X envisioned these Eastern European thug kids becoming inspired by how 'punk' putting your music on Bandcamp could be—especially all these imaginary vaporwave aliases—except these kids hated all the slowed down shit and thought it was 'for pussies'—so they launched HARDVAPOUR.

On 9 December 2015, producer Hong Kong Express, under the alias Sandtimer, released Vaporwave Is Dead also under Dream Catalogue, which announced the "death" of vaporwave and a "new era." The album features a spoken word track with the lyrics, “Now, in the beginnings of the end of the world, vaporwave is dead. From now on, it will only be… the hardvapour.”

== Musical characteristics ==
Common elements include thick synthesizer sounds, programmed drums, fast tempos, and influences of acid house, big beat, broken beat, gabber, speedcore, noise music, hard techno, industrial techno, hardstyle and drum 'n' bass. The 56-track compilation album Hardvapour. by DJ VLAD, released worldwide via Antifur's Bandcamp page, showcases elements and influences from a variety of styles, such as techno, industrial music and trap. Hacking For Freedom by Wolfenstein OS X's pseudonym Flash Kostivich was characterised by journalist Matt Broomfield as a "unique sonic space somewhere between early Clicks and Cuts compilations and the soundtrack to the 1995 anime Ghost in the Shell."

Thump contributor Rob Arcand interprets the hardvapour sound as a rebellion against vaporwave that sometimes toys with elements of punk music. Examples such as "Humanoid Sound (гуманоид звук)" by Trende borrow the three-chord song structure of punk, while "Immortal" by DJ Alina features basslines distorted in a similar fashion to the works of Circle Jerks or Dead Kennedys. Arcand views hardvapour as somewhere between vaporwave and a genre journalist Adam Harper calls distroid, a style that was "hi-fi to the point of actively fetishizing the hi-frequency hisses and twinkles that lo-fi was unable to produce." According to Arcand, in common with vaporwave, hardvapour uses similar music software tools "not out of any special fixation with them, but simply because they're now the cheapest and most accessible tools around."

== Subcultural identity ==
The hardvapour aesthetic is influenced by Eastern European culture and some of its producers are thought to be of Eastern European origin; the J-card of the hardvapour. compilation album reveals that around a quarter of the producers included and involved were from Russia, Ukraine and Croatia. Other producers like Flash, DJ Alina, and Krokodil Hunter have falsely labeled themselves to be Ukrainian and Russian, which German critic Jens Balzer felt added quirkiness to the hardvapour scene.

wosX has noted that one of the major goals of hardvapour was "globalization" and showcasing the true harsh cultures of not only Eastern European but also other nations. According to Matt Broomfield where vaporwave "exposes the artificiality below the utopic sheen of late capitalism" hardvapour "throws post-apocalyptic raves in defiance of dystopia."

Thump writer Rob Arcand noted hardvapour's self-mocking aspect to be another major part of the culture with track titles such as "Long Live Hardvapour" and "Welcome to Hardvapour" that "either directly referencing the movement itself or obliquely mocking how the sound will be interpreted online (or eventually declared "over") though an endless proliferation of bizarre .gifs and nihilistic photos and videos." Elements of cyberpunk also heavily come into play into the works of hardvapour and their visual aesthetic, such as on Hacking For Freedom whose iconography is inspired by the film The Matrix (1999) and the LPs Visions by Chinese Hackers and Жорсткий щойно випав сніг by Bannik Krew that feature aspects of the frequent cyberpunk element of surveillance footage.

According to Thump's Colin Joyce, "At the forefront of the genre is the absurdly prolific collective and label H.V.R.F. (short for hardvapour Resistance Front). According to their Bandcamp, they're based in Pripyat, Ukraine, a ghost town near the border the country shares with Belarus. It seems unlikely, however, that anyone associated with the collective is actually based there, given that the city was evacuated after the Chernobyl nuclear disaster in 1986."

== Reception ==
Hardvapour was called "exciting" by the publications THUMP, and the British magazine Dazed According to Dazed, hardvapour garnered criticism from many vaporwave listeners as an "over-worn in-joke" mainly due to the "arcane backstories" that conceptualised most releases of the style. Any discussion of hardvapour is banned from the official subreddit for vaporwave. Hong Kong Express responded to this banning: "Some people can't take things with humour in seriously for some reason. It’s closer to Dr. Strangelove – a serious message with a dark and humorous slant.”

== See also ==
- Sovietwave
- New Sincerity
- Poverty porn
