= Luxury Elite =

American musician (born 1988)

luxury elite

Background information
- Also known as: 1-800-TONIGHT, night video, television archives
- Born: August 17, 1988 (age 37); United States
- Genres: Electronic; plunderphonics; vaporwave
- Occupation: Producer
- Years active: 2012–present
- Label: Fortune 500
- Website: luxuryelite.bandcamp.com

Luxury Elite, (Note: Stylized in all lowercase.) also simply known as Lux (born August 17, 1988), is an anonymous American musician known for her significant influence in the vaporwave genre. During the 2010s, her lo-fi sound and visual style, along with her relaxed melodies, made her an impactful figure in the "late night lo-fi" subgenre. She also produced music under the aliases 1-800-TONIGHT, night video, television archives, and creative zen.

Lux released her debut album in 2012, and made her first collaboration with a vaporwave artist the same year. She became an established figure following the release of Late Night Delight, her 2013 split album with vaporwave artist Ryan DeRobertis under the alias Saint Pepsi. She also worked on a single with future funk musician Macross 82-99, and participated on many collaborative projects by small record labels. Her music, including tracks such as "S.W.A.K." and "Upscale" from her 2015 album World Class, has been recognized as a tribute to the United States in the 1980s, emphasizing the elite visual and sound presentation. She participated on plunderphonics trio Death's Dynamic Shroud's remix version of I'll Try Living Like This, and continued her career with albums such as Noir (2016) and High Society (2020). Noir was named one of the greatest albums of 2016 by several publications, while High Society was chosen as one of the best releases of 2020 by Bandcamp Daily.

== Life and career ==
=== Early life and debut trilogy (1988–2012) ===
Luxury Elite was born on August 17, 1988. She said that during her youth she disliked 1980s pop culture, which was changed by her interest in Thomas Fec's electronic alias Tobacco. She listened to chillwave and vaporwave since 2011 on the collaborative streaming site Turntable.fm, where she would sarcastically say the Luxury Elite project would be coming soon. In 2012, she started producing music under the alias, releasing the albums I and II. Lux said these served more as "collections" instead of albums, as they contained the first tracks she had ever produced. By the end of the year she released both as the compilation album I&II. Lux's first split album was Atlas of Fictional Islands / Customer Service with Mensa Group International; her track "One Moment Please" was featured in a playlist by Radio K. III (2012) brought her music to a more specific sound and, to her, represented the first time a Lux release "felt more like an album".

=== Late Night Delight, Fortune 500, and collaborations (2013–2014) ===
Lux described her following release, Rose Quartz (2013), as an "actual album." She said the record gave her direction, particularly its tracks "Skyscraper" and "Sparkling". In early 2013, her second split album was released: Late Night Delight with Saint Pepsi, the future funk pseudonym of Ryan DeRobertis. It established her as a prominent vaporwave artist, and was regarded as a classic of the genre. Adam Harper, writing for music publication Electronic Beats, chose Late Night Delight as the best vaporwave release in 2013, alongside Computer Death by Infinity Frequencies. A remaster including three bonus tracks was released in cassette tape. Lux felt her side was inferior to DeRobertis', although concluding that "it worked out for the best." Mac Tonight, the McDonald's mascot featured in the artwork, became a vaporwave icon and one of the main examples of the movement's aesthetics; the character's actor, Doug Jones, was surprised upon discovering its impact in the genre.

Two Lux albums released in 2013, TV Party and With Love, presented tracks that were later included in an official vaporwave-themed playlist by Spotify. On April 9, 2013, Lux released music videos for six different tracks: "Late Night TV" and "Poolside" from I&II; "Skyscraper" from Rose Quartz; and "Mild Seven", "Schaumburg", and "Nightlife" from Late Night Delight. She promoted her album Blind Date (2013) with a video for "Private" on April 11. For Fantasy (2013), Lux created music videos for "Celine" and "Pearl", released on May 27 and July 3 respectively. The record later featured its own video album with an altered tracklist, Fantasy VHS, which was broadcast on the Internet TV channel Network Awesome. Also in 2013, Lux created her own record label, registering it on Bandcamp with the name Fortune 500. She designed the label to release only vaporwave, as she felt other labels within the scene were turning to seapunk. One of the label's releases was Fortune 420, a compilation album published through the venue SPF420. It featured what Ryan Simpson of Tiny Mix Tapes called a "suitably impressive lineup," including aliases such as DeRobertis' Saint Pepsi and George Clanton's Esprit Fantasy. (Note: Stylized as ESPRIT 空想.)

Fortune 500 was closed in early 2014, with its last release being 18 Carat Affair's Adventures in Schizophrenia. Also during early 2014, Lux participated on three collaborative record label releases: Living Room Visions Winter 2014 by Sunup Recordings, ∜♡MDISCS 2K13 by Amdiscs, and Touched by an Angle by Crash Symbols. She also worked with future funk musician Macross 82-99 on the single "ウォーク·オン·バイ". (Note: Japanese for "Walk on By".) Lux's first EP, Controversial (2014), received praise from Japanese publication Mikiki for continuing the sample-based tradition of vaporwave, and its track "Vengeance" was included in a video by artist collective Everything Is Terrible!. In September, Lux collaborated with vaporwave artist Skeleton Lipstick on the album Stay Passionate, Be Discrete, featuring artwork by electronic musician Keith Rankin. Also in September, she released Viewers Like You under the secret alias Television Archives, which she publicly revealed six years later in 2020.

=== World Class, Noir, and hiatus (2015–2018) ===
Lux released Moods in 2015, which continued her 1980s style. Her thirteenth studio album, World Class (2015), was released in July. It was named one of the best Bandcamp releases of the month by music magazine DIY. It was also listed as one of the best albums of 2015 by Justin Shay of WPKN. The physical version, released by Crash Symbols, included two bonus tracks and remixes from other vaporwave musicians, including Golden Living Room and Cat System Corp. The latter's work, a remix of "Strut", was included on Spotify's vaporwave playlist. During this time, Lux worked with Cat System Corp. on a track for his album Class of '84 (2015), and participated on the collaborative release The Eternal Dream System (2015) by label Dream Catalogue. In November, Lux collaborated with vaporwave trio Death's Dynamic Shroud for a remix version of a track from their album I'll Try Living Like This, and produced new material for a radio show by 2814 member Hong Kong Express.

In January 2016, Lux released her fourteenth album Noir. It was chosen as one of the best releases from the first quarter of 2016 by writer Miles Bowe of Fact, and considered by him the best Bandcamp release of the month. Bandcamp Daily's Bryan McKay also listed it as one of the best albums from the first half of 2016. Oliver Bothe of German magazine Éclat noted the record's kitsch and film score sound, while music publication Tiny Mix Tapes wrote that it "jettisons vaporwave's weighty, pseudo-academic treatment of critical narrative — chic critique — for a more familiar dialogue, one defined by finitude and linearity." Following Noir, Lux did not release any new albums for two years, citing controversies in 2016 and problems with her PC as causes. During this period, she began listening to new wave and post-punk music, such as Devo's 1981 record New Traditionalists. In 2017, the mobile video game Data Wing was released, which featured her music as part of its soundtrack.

=== Prism and High Society (2018–present) ===
Her first album in two years, Prism (2018), was released in July and saw her return to her usual style of sound. Its single "Salut" preceded it by a month. In June 2020, Lux did a radio series on radio station WRFL entitled Lux Visions, which was initially promoted as a "one and done" series called "Noise From the Attic". Those episodes have since been preserved on the Lux Visions Mixcloud page. Also in 2020, Lux was invited by Tobacco for his release party of Hot, Wet & Sassy; after knowing of Fec's liking of the Luxury Elite project, she described the event as "a full-circle moment."

Lux released her fifteenth album High Society in October 2020, and its video counterpart in November. It was named one of the best releases of October 2020 and of the entire year by Miles Bowe. In 2021, she collaborated on the mixtape Doom Mix, Vol. V with the track "Psychology of Desire", which Pitchfork described as "confident in riding out a single idea across its entire runtime." Her second EP, Dance Party (2021), featured a visual version in 2022. Also in 2022, Lux released a video album for 1-800-TONIGHT (2022) under the alias of the same name, which initially caused confusion among some who thought it would replace the Luxury Elite project.

== Impact and legacy ==
Lux has been referred to as a "vaporwave OG" for having pioneered the lo-fi vaporwave sound and innovating within the scene. She has been regarded as one of the genre's originators and, since the release of Late Night Delight, a classic vaporwave name. 2814 member and anonymous musician Hong Kong Express described Lux as "perfect" in her late night lo-fi sound and depiction of romantic themes, and commented: "If Vektroid is the 'Queen of Vaporwave', then perhaps luxury elite can be considered its princess."

"I've started to think of Luxury Elite's music the same way I do perfumes. From album titles (Blind Date, Late Night Delight) to specific songs ('First Kiss', 'Debonair'), Lux has a way of channeling these aural impressions as brief, beguiling spritzes. It's the synesthesia treatment offered to old magazine ads, the glimmer of jewelry on the Home Shopping Network. That ear for arrangement and the subtle thematic qualities of her releases have made Luxury Elite one of the most dependably great vaporwave producers."

— Miles Bowe of Fact

In albums such as Moods, World Class, and Noir, Lux's tracks "are distinct and focused," according to Miles Bowe. He emphasized the conceptual clarity of her music as the aspect that most elevated it above other vaporwave works. Bowe also considered Lux as one of the most unique musicians within the genre, and said her discography represented "the highest quality run of albums in all of vaporwave." In Milan, a vaporwave-styled bar features "Luxury Elite" as a drink.

== Artistry ==
=== Influences ===
Lux's music was inspired by artists including 18 Carat Affair, Tobacco, and Vektroid. 18 Carat Affair's 60/40 (2009), specifically its cover, was a main point of inspiraction for Lux to start her own vaporwave project, with the name "18 Carat Affair" inspiring the high-class feel of "Luxury Elite". Vektroid evoked her interest in the genre; she later said that when first listening to Floral Shoppe (2011), her experience with the album was "wild", describing it as mind-blowing. Her passion for the 1980s was influenced by Tobacco; Lux's use of various 1980s video tapes for the visual version of Fantasy was mainly inspired by his style of sampling on Fucked Up Friends (2008). During the project's beginning, she was also heavily influenced by the 1982 K-tel compilation Neon Nights, which later became the name of Luxury Elite's online radio show.

Lux watched MTV from at least four years old, describing herself as obsessed with it. She also watched The Weather Channel during her childhood and teenage years, with its Local on the 8s segment specifically having inspired her appreciation for jazz and vaporwave. Through Tumblr, Lux accessed many screenshots of 1980s commercials, which she too considered an influence in her liking of the decade's aesthetic. She has synesthesia, and stated that the condition influences how her tracklisting is sequenced. The TV series Twin Peaks is described by Lux as immersive, a feeling that has also played a role in her musical releases. The series is also mentioned in her Twitter profile and referenced in the 2023 album Fashion Pop. Both Fashion Pop and her earlier release Ocean Pacific (2022) were inspired by Lux's travels to Los Angeles in 2021.

=== Production ===
Lux works exclusively with samples and continuously loops them in many of her tracks. She originally added synths on "Crystal" from World Class, but removed them as she "didn't feel like it was good enough." When searching for samples, she targets tracks with intros and interludes of her liking, sometimes including lyrical portions. Describing the process, she said: "I usually find my music through hours of searching for tracks on YouTube. Music searching puts me in a trance, but there have been many times I have gone through and have found nothing. I am extremely picky with my samples." She recalled that after finalizing a sample search, many of her songs of choice features claps, which she attributed to the earworm effect the sound creates. Lux sees her music as a form of escapism, and credited negative emotions as a catalyst for "the best Lux music." Her anonymity is a form of emphasizing this aspect, as well as maintaining a sense of mystery.

During her teenhood, Lux used to create custom ringtones for her friends, which served as a basis for her knowledge of WAV editing. She uses a WAV file editor and Audacity as her main means of production, and previously used Adobe Audition. Lux admitted not knowing how to play physical instruments, and said she did not have any. Of her earlier work, Lux recalled it often took more of a trial and error approach which improved her production abilities, and acknowledged that her first albums, particularly I and II, could be improved. With the breakthrough of Late Night Delight in the early 2010s, she felt insecure regarding her abilities as a sample manipulator. In Fantasy's 13 tracks, Lux sampled mostly from a series of songs uploaded on a found YouTube channel, which was later taken down due to copyright violations. When asked in a 2015 interview about violation concerns, Lux said such issues terrify her, saying her releases' presence on Spotify "isn't very comforting to me."

=== Musical style ===
Categorically, Luxury Elite's music has been referred to as vaporwave, funk, jazz, late night lo-fi, lounge, Muzak, pop, R&B, smooth jazz, and synthpop, often repurposing genres such as city pop, electro, Italo disco, new jack swing, and rock. Artists sampled include Al Corley, the Crusaders, D Train, Eighth Wonder, General Caine, Jesse Johnson, Michael Jackson, and Paula Abdul. Lux's lo-fi style has been integral in her artistry, being incorporated extensively in her records and visual albums. Her music drew comparisons to Saint Pepsi's Hit Vibes. According to Brazilian writer Ícaro Estivalet Raymundo, Lux's laid-back melodies and soft musical textures "evoke the special late night hours, intended for melancholics." The aesthetics of literal luxury are also a defining characteristic, intending to elicit themes of late 20th century wealth. Despite certain publications' attempts at linking her work to political commentary, specifically "late capitalist nightmares" and issues of gender identity, Lux stated she never considered this perspective, instead focusing on aspects of 1980s nostalgia, and "never really felt any sort of way about being stuck in a boys club". Her music is mostly instrumental and intends to evoke optimistic feelings, as according to her, sadder music can be more draining.

"S.W.A.K."
The opening track of World Class (2015), described by DIY music writer Tom Walters as "a bold, funk-filled pop song."

"Another Scorcher"
"Another Scorcher", a track from the 2020 album High Society. The record features glitch-led progressions as a primary production technique.

With "All Night" from Late Night Delight, Lux's use of a late 1970s sample, Michael Jackson's "Off the Wall", vividly shows intergenerational nostalgia, Carlos Alberto and Velasco Martínez stated in their study on vaporwave's contemporary image. By removing the lyrics "I want to rock with you / All night" from their original context and looping the latter portion, Lux suggests, according to the writers, disguised sinister intentions manifested by an uncanny form of déjà vu. Dave Schilling of Grantland shared similar feelings, calling the track "terrifying". Lux's side of the record was described by Miles Bowe as "chillout-meets-waiting-room Muzak." "Shadows" from 2013's Sincerely exemplifies a simple track from Lux's discography, according to Tecnocampus' Vladyslav Bohdanov. He observed that, despite not appearing to feature significant modifications, Lux changes the track's emotional tone in a "fascinating" way, with its music video emphasizing this.

With World Class, Tom Walters commented that Lux fully developed her passion with the United States in the 1980s. He noted this on the tracks "S.W.A.K." and "Upscale". In the former, Lux shows the more funk and pop-focused structures of her music, while in the latter she demonstrates a balearic beat influence. With this, Walters analyzed, the record's sound evokes a fictional noir version of Tom Cruise's Cocktail (1988), "full of smoke-filled scenes of low-lit bars and brutalist executive suites." Similarly, Bohdanov observed that World Class represented Lux's interest in creating a score-like album. He added that Lux's common elite themes, presented in the album through track titles, further emphasize the visual presentation and sounds of the record.

Of Noir, Miles Bowe wrote that Lux's incorporation of more relaxed melodies is heard throughout, exemplifying tropical-like sounds on "Future" to a moodier tone on "Desire". He highlighted the emphasized use of bass and praised each track's uniqueness within the record, "ranging from cozy locked grooves like 'Raindrops' to the chintzy strut of 'Future'." Many tracks on the record feature the saxophone as a main instrument, with the opening track "Arrival" initially conveying a sense of nervousness to it before affirmating a bolder tone. "Lounge" and "Dreaming" emphasize the sax's sound, with Tiny Mix Tapes stating that the latter presents the "ontological finitude that Noir embraces." Under the Radar's Chris Cudby stated that High Society presents Lux's music as that of a "stylish soirée." The record is dedicated primarily to developing simple melodies within glitch-led progressions, including songs like "Dancefloor Euphoria" and "Another Scorcher". In it, a more multi-layered instrumentation approach is taken; "Ocean View", for example, presents a metallic synth sound in the background, while the end track "William and Julianna" features a guitar riff.

== Discography ==
Studio albums

- I (2012)
- II (2012)
- III (2012)
- 101.7 WAVE (2012)
- Rose Quartz (2013)
- TV Party (2013)
- New Classics (2013)
- With Love (2013)
- Blind Date (2013)
- Fantasy (2013)
- 101.7 WAVE II (2014)
- Moods (2015)
- World Class (2015)
- Noir (2016)
- Prism (2018)
- High Society (2020)
- Blue Eyeshadow (2021)
- Ocean Pacific (2022)
- Fashion Pop (2023)
- Talk Soup (2024)

Collaborations

- Atlas of Fictional Islands / Customer Service with Mensa Group International (2012)
- Late Night Delight with Saint Pepsi (2013)
- Stay Passionate, Be Discrete with Skeleton Lipstick (2014)
- Intercontinental with SYLLABUS (2014)
- "ウォーク·オン·バイ" with Macross 82-99 (2014)
- "내 마음은 떨고" on the remix version of I'll Try Living Like This (2015)
- "Psychology of Desire" on Doom Mix, Vol. V (2021)

Compilations

- I&II (2012)
- Sincerely (2013)
- Blind Date | Rose Quartz (2019)
- Face B: The B-Sides Collection (2025)

EPs

- Controversial (2014)
- Dance Party (2021)

Video albums

- Fantasy VHS (2013)
- High Society VHS (2020)
- After Hours VHS (2022)
- Dance Party VHS (2022)
- Talk Soup VHS (2024)

Other projects

- Viewers Like You (2014, as Television Archives)
- Night Video (2016, as Night Video)
- 1-800-TONIGHT (2022, as 1-800-TONIGHT)
- 1-800-TONIGHT II (2025, as 1-800-TONIGHT)
- Touch (2025, as Creative Zen)

== See also ==
- 1980s in fashion
- 1980s in television
