= John Zobele =

American vaporwave musician (born 1993)

Christtt
- Also known as: Bye-Product; Ambient Shit; Cordless Soul Machine; Father2006; Death Channel; Screen Recording; American; Alegria™
- Born: John Zobele; 1993 (age 32–33)
- Genres: Vaporwave; plunderphonics; ambient; chillwave
- Years active: 2010–present
- Label: Business Casual
- Website: christtt.com

John Zobele (born 1993), professionally known under the aliases of Christtt (stylized in all-lowercase, formerly stylized as chris†††) and Father2006 (often stylized as 아버지), is an American vaporwave musician and Internet artist based in Pittsburgh, Pennsylvania. He has released music since 2010 under numerous aliases and founded multiple labels in that time, most notably Business Casual (called Business Casual 87' until 2014), an Internet music label known for its weekly releases that is still operated by Zobele today.

== Early life ==
John Zobele was born in 1993 and grew up in Central Jersey. He moved to Pittsburgh, Pennsylvania to attend film school.

== Career ==
Zobele first started making music in 2009, producing house tracks using a cracked version of FL Studio. Later, he got into witch house. It wasn't until Zobele heard Oneohtrix Point Never's Replica and went down the rabbit hole of other music inspired by the artist, in particular vaporwave, that he started the Christtt project in 2013. One of the aliases used by Zobele from 2010 to 2013 was Bye-Product. He was also one half of stab something, together with Jamie Paige. They released a self-titled album in 2012.

Taking inspiration from Replica, Macintosh Plus, and Memorex by Smash TV, a "visual mix" consisting of "chopped up 80s and 90s commercials" featuring music by Boards of Canada, VHS Head, Hype Williams, among others, Zobele began working on the first Christtt EP, 266, released in March 2013.

On December 24, 2015, Zobele released White Death, the debut album under Father2006. Made in one day, it deals with the death of Zobele's father from cancer. 2016 saw the release of the fourth Christtt album, No Lives Matter, as well as the second installment in the Father2006 trilogy, Reflection, which was released on December 27. No Lives Matter is informed by Zobele's time in college, working on his senior thesis film. In defence of the title, a play on the slogan "All Lives Matter", he argues that it's an accurate description of how he felt at the time, "just super sad and angry".

No Lives Matter was followed up with Social Justice Whatever, released in May 2017. The album is, as described by Zobele, a "time capsule of [his] time online between 2007 and 2017" made after the election of Donald Trump which threw the Internet in a turmoil that made him miss "the old Internet".

In September 2018, Zobele released Deep Dark Trench, his sixth studio album as Christtt. The project deals with the cultural reckoning the USA underwent after the 9/11 attacks in 2001. The album is entirely sample-based, even including audio snippets of TV broadcasts from the day itself covering the disaster. This approach has been likened to "a photo collage, or a ransom note".

During the first year of the COVID-19 pandemic, Zobele made and released Residue, the third album of the Father2006 project. Chronologically it is situated before both Reflection and White Death, dealing with the first diagnosis of cancer, completing the story of Zobele's father who "got cancer, was cured of cancer, and then got cancer again".

In 2022, Zobele released the eighth Christtt album, A.D. Another concept album, it follows the event of judgement day in the US as seen through digital artifacts.

After the release of lead single "Earth", Zobele released Horizons, an ambient album informed by the failure of Horizon Worlds, under the new alias of Alegria™ on September 1, 2023. The name comes from the iconic Alegria style employed by Meta and other tech companies, as well as the cover art for Horizons. In researching for the album, Zobele spent a lot of time in Horizon Worlds VR, recording and sampling its background music and sound effects, as an act of digital preservation. Also in September, Zobele would revive the Father2006 alias to release the single "Black Box" on the occasion of Bandcamp Friday. As of June 2026, "Black Box" remains the final release under Father2006.

WWW, Christtt's ninth studio album, was released on May 17, 2024. Zobele has described it as "a what if scenario of world war 3 happen[ing] online and the soldiers are from different factions of the Internet". WWW was followed by Soft Rock, released on September 19, 2025.

=== Business Casual ===
Zobele founded Business Casual 87' in May 2013, later dropping the "87'" from the name. He had founded his first label back in 2010 after being kicked out a different net label's fan club. For years, Business Casual put out a new release weekly, most of them coupled with a physical release, and in addition sold monthly packages of exclusive tapes, called "BizBoxes". By 2018, Business Casual had released over 160 projects all falling under the wider vaporwave umbrella term.

== Discography ==
=== As Christtt ===
Studio albums

- 2013 – Frasierwave
- 2013 – 7年后 (lit. '7 Years Later')
- 2014 – New Wounds
- 2016 – No Lives Matter
- 2017 – Social Justice Whatever
- 2018 – Deep Dark Trench
- 2020 – Alone Online
- 2022 – A.D.
- 2024 – WWW
- 2025 – Soft Rock

EPs

- 2013 – 266
- 2013 – WAV
- 2013 – Forgo††en
- 2014 – 包容 (lit. 'Tolerate')
- 2014 – Waiting
- 2014 – A Better Place
- 2018 – Sacrificial Lamb

=== As Father2006 ===
Studio albums

- 2015 – 흰색 죽음 (lit. 'White Death')
- 2016 – Reflection
- 2020 – Residue

Singles

- 2023 – "Black Box"

=== As Alegria™ ===
Studio albums

- 2023 – Horizons
- 2026 – Meta
