= Angel Marcloid =

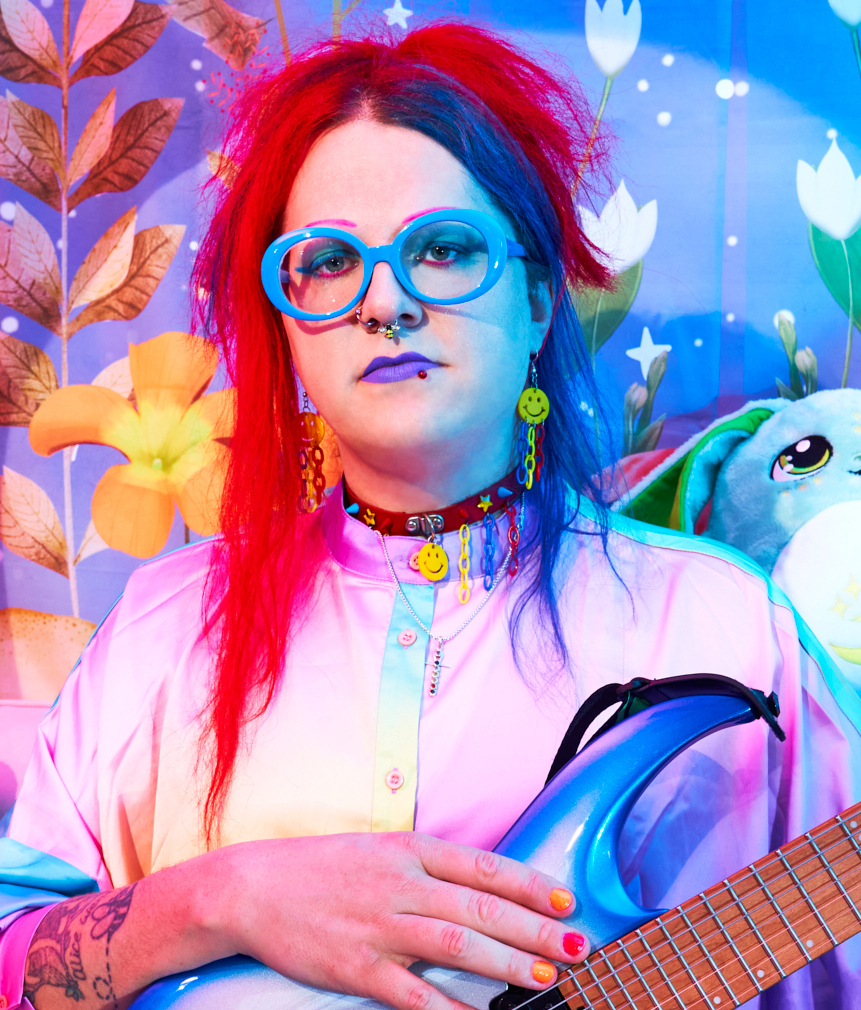
- Marcloid in 2023

Background information
- Also known as: Fire-Toolz, MindSpring Memories, Nonlocal Forecast, Angelwings Marmalade, Toad Computers, Angel Hair Audio
- Born: September 24, 1984 (age 41); Prince Frederick, Maryland, US
- Origin: Chicago, Illinois, US
- Genres: Experimental; IDM; jazz fusion; ambient; cybergrind; vaporwave; extreme metal; prog; industrial; new-age; screamo; emo; powerviolence; noise
- Occupations: Musician; producer; mastering engineer; mixing engineer
- Instruments: Guitar; keyboards; drums; bass guitar; vocals; VSTs
- Labels: Geometric Lullaby; Hausu Mountain; Needlejuice Records; Orange Milk Records; Warp
- Formerly of: Age Sixteen, Lilu Dallas, A Perfect Kiss, Sea Breezes, New Years, Sawhorse (MD), Widow's Bath, Pregnant Bed
- Website: fire-toolz.com, angelmarcloid.com, angelhairaudio.com,

Angel Marcloid (born September 24, 1984), best known by her main pseudonym and project Fire-Toolz, is an American experimental multi-instrumentalist, record producer, mix and mastering engineer, and visual artist who creates music blending a number of different genres.

== Biography ==
Angel Marcloid (full name: Angelia Faye Marcloid) was born on September 24, 1984 at a hospital in Prince Frederick, Maryland. Her parents were music enthusiasts who listened to Queensrÿche, Winger, Rush, Fates Warning, Dream Theater, RATT, and various other hair metal, progressive rock, and hard rock bands.

She made her first drum sets with pots, pans, and trash cans when she was very young. She performed live for the first time as a drummer when she was 7 years old, and formed her first band at 8 years old. The band was called Eye Forgot, featuring GRAMMY-Winning LA session musician Andrew Synowiec on guitar. Marcloid later taught herself to play guitar and bass. Her music taste began to expand as she started listening to traditional emo, death metal, jazz fusion, and electronica. She has performed under more than a dozen pseudonyms since the 1990s, and has played in multiple bands, including Age Sixteen, Lilu Dallas, Sawhorse (MD), and A Perfect Kiss.

Marcloid created her project Fire-Toolz in 2015 and released Even the Files Won't Touch You and Further Down the Files in the same year. The latter was dominantly a remix album but contained 3 new songs. She went on to release Drip Mental (2017), Interbeing (2017), Skinless X-1 (2018), which received widespread critical acclaim. The following year Fire-Toolz released Field Whispers (Into The Crystal Palace) (2019), followed by Rainbow Bridge (2020), Eternal Home (2021), I will not use the body's eyes today (2022), I Am Upset Because I See Something That Is Not There (2023) and Breeze (2024).

Alongside Fire-Toolz, Marcloid makes ambient sample-based vaporwave/slushwave as MindSpring Memories, noise/experimental music as Angelwings Marmalade, sample-based signalwave/vaporwave/mallsoft as Toad Computers, and prog/new age/jazz fusion/MIDI music as Nonlocal Forecast.

From 2008 to 2017, Marcloid ran a DIY, low-budget cassette label called Rainbow Bridge. She also ran a net label called Swamp Circle from 2012 until 2018. As of 2020, she owns and runs a mixing, mastering, and music production studio called Angel Hair Audio, LLC.

In 2010, Marcloid filled in on drums for Swedish emo/screamo band Suis La Lune for their North American tour.

In 2022, Marcloid collaborated with long-time friend Jed Davis (Jessica Simpson, Juliana Hatfield, Hanslick Rebellion) to record a number of songs from Jed's past, including the song Halfway To September featuring Tony Levin (King Crimson, Peter Gabriel) on Chapman Stick, and Chris Barber (Crazy Town) on drums.

In 2026, Marcloid signed with Warp Records for the release of Lavender Networks.

== Personal life ==
Angel Marcloid is transgender, specifically non-binary and trans-femme. She prefers she/her pronouns.

Marcloid's spiritual inclinations are diverse and include aspects of Buddhism, Advaita Vedanta, Christian mysticism, nondualism, and A Course in Miracles.

== Discography ==
=== Fire-Toolz ===
==== Albums ====
- Even the Files Won't Touch You (2015)
- Drip Mental (2017)
- Interbeing (2017)
- Skinless X-1 (2018)
- Field Whispers (Into the Crystal Palace) (2019)
- Rainbow Bridge (2020)
- Eternal Home (2021)
- Eternal Home (Instrumentals) (2021)
- I will not use the body's eyes today (2022)
- I am upset because I see something that is not there. (2023)
- Breeze (2024)
- Lavender Networks (2026)

==== Remix albums ====
- Further Down the Files (2015)
- [CODENAME_REMIXES VOL 1] (2017)
- Interbeing Remix Vol. 1 (2018)
- Interbeing Remix Vol. 2 (2018)
- Triangular Reformat (2019)
- Rainbow Bridge: Remixed by My Friends (2022)

==== EPs ====
- I Can't Die (2021)
- I Can't Die as Well (2022)

==== Singles ====
- "Synonym" (2020)
- "Antihero" (2020)
- "! [CODENAME_JEREMY]" (2020)
- "The TRUTH about HELL!" (featuring Trust Fund Ozu) (2020)
- "BLINKMUFFIN" (2021)
- "Bioblade" (split with R23X) (2021)
- "More Spirit Spit Please" (featuring Sam Greenfield) (2021)
- "Race for Titles" (featuring Lipsticism) (2022)
- "Tai Shan" (featuring Sling Beam) (2023)
- "All the Time (Angel's Version)" (featuring Lipsticism) (2023)
- "RE: Official Request for Reciprocal Indwelling Procedure" (2024)
- "The Envy of the Heavenly Powers" (2024)
- "To every squirrel who has ever been hit by a car, I'm sorry and I love you." (featuring Nylist & Lipsticism) (2024)
