= 2814 =

English vaporwave project

- Origin: London, England; Sterling, Ohio, US
- Genres: Dreampunk; slushwave; ambient
- Years active: 2014–2020
- Labels: Dream Catalogue; Ailanthus Recordings
- Members: t e l e p a t h テレパシー能力者; HKE

2814 (stylized in fullwidth characters as ２８１４) is a British-American collaborative ambient and vaporwave project of the electronic musicians Luke Laurila, also known as Telepath (stylized as t e l e p a t h テレパシー能力者), and David Russo, also known as HKE (an abbreviation of the earlier moniker Hong Kong Express), respectively. The duo is best known for its second album, Birth of a New Day (新しい日の誕生), described by Rolling Stone as "a late night cruise through the cyber-future dream highway".

== History ==
2814 debuted in 2014 with a self-titled release on the Internet music label Ailanthus Recordings. The album was followed up in early 2015 by Birth of a New Day, released digitally and in a limited run of CDs on HKE's own label, Dream Catalogue. An Indiegogo campaign later in 2015 to press a double LP record version of the album ended with £6,432 at 161% of its goal. The project released its third album, Rain Temple, in 2016. In 2019, the duo released a compilation album, Lost Fragments, which contained the duo's previous works found on other compilations, as well as new releases.

== Influence ==
The project has described its own work as a focus on the surreal qualities of vaporwave rather than a 1980s or 1990s aesthetic. In the group's interview with Rolling Stone, HKE said when describing Birth of a New Day, "We wanted to show how the whole vaporwave vibe could be made as original music rather than just relying on the same muzak and kitsch-pop samples everyone else had been using for years..." Not Not Fun Records boss Brit Brown called the album "amazing cyberfuture ambient vaporwave", while Vice called the duo "vaporwave superstars".

The group's later album, Rain Temple, was described by HKE as "intense, dramatic and cinematic", and as containing elements of spirituality.

== Reception ==
As of 2015, 2814’s albums were often staples of the Bandcamp charts. The group's LP Birth of a New Day managed to gain much praise from critics, while maintaining a cult following from internet users.

== Discography ==
=== Studio albums ===
Title	Details
2814	Released: October 25, 2014; Label: Ailanthus Recordings
新しい日の誕生 (Birth of a New Day)	Released: January 21, 2015; Label: Dream Catalogue
Rain Temple	Released: July 26, 2016; Label: Dream Catalogue

=== Compilation ===
Title	Details
Lost Fragments	Released: July 5, 2019; Label: Dream Catalogue

=== Extended plays ===
Title	Details
Pillar / New Sun	Released: February 1, 2018; Label: Arcola
Voyage / Embrace	Released: September 9, 2020; Label: Virtual Dream Plaza

== See also ==
- List of ambient music artists
