= Dreampunk =

Microgenre of electronic music

- Stylistic origins: Ambient; electronic; film score; vaporwave; liquid funk; synthwave; downtempo; drone; dark ambient; techno; dubstep; jungle; future garage; electro
- Cultural origins: Mid-2010s, United Kingdom

Other topics
- 2814; cyberpunk; surrealism; hardvapour

Dreampunk is a microgenre of electronic music characterized by its focus on cinematic ambience and field recordings, combined with various traits and techniques from electronic genres such as techno, jungle, electro, and dubstep.

== History ==
Dreampunk emerged in the mid-2010s. Many early dreampunk artists drew influence from film scores, vaporwave, and drum and bass. Dreampunk originates from the debut of 2814, the ambient duo composed of Luke Laurila (t e l e p a t h テレパシー能力者) and David Russo (Hong Kong Express). The name is derived from the word cyberpunk because of its frequent use of imagined metropolitan spaces in its sound design, evoking the experience of walking through a futuristic city.

== Origins ==
Dreampunk initially began on January 29, 2014, when British musician David Russo launched the Dream Catalogue label, which specialized in vaporwave and "dream music" (the forename to dreampunk). Inspired by the films of Wong Kar-Wai, Russo explored dreamlike ambient music under the name Hong Kong Express. After befriending American vaporwave producer Luke Laurila (t e l e p a t h テレパシー能力者), the two swiftly released solo albums on Dream Catalogue, across many anonymous aliases. In October 2014, Russo and Laurila formed a collaborative project, 2814, a duo which would garner praise from critics and internet users alike. In 2015, Vice published an article commending 2814's second cyberpunk ambient vaporwave album, 新しい日の誕生 (Birth of a New Day), calling it a "slip into a world of neon and rain, mist and memory". Drifting from their predecessors, 2814 were steadfast about not using samples, which contrasted the mindset of the label's other musicians, like 猫 シ Corp, Death's Dynamic Shroud, Nmesh, and Vaperror. Despite their success on Bandcamp, Russo purged Dream Catalogue of many of its sampled albums to avoid copyright disputes and focus on his self-described "dream music". The schism between dreampunk and vaporwave was described by Russo as "the whole dream music vibe is certainly fluid enough to encompass lots of different musical styles, while still retaining certain elements that make the label stand out as a whole—surreality, futurism, heavy concepts and story-driven projects, while vaporwave as a term and an idea has become something of a burden to everyone involved with it." From 2016 until 2018, Russo and a new wave of artists at Dream Catalogue largely focused on wosX's tongue-in-cheek hardvapour style and the short-lived ghost tech style, giving way for other labels to lead the dreampunk movement.

=== Early scene ===
The early years of dreampunk revolved around various netlabels, which were the focal point of the community. With the adoption of Twitter messaging, net radio shows, and livestreamed festivals like SPF420, the newly formed group of artists were quick to connect with one another and subsequently release albums on each other's labels.

One of dreampunk's earliest proprietors was No Problema Tapes, the cassette oriented label run by Pablo Salas and Gonzalo Silva. The label had early ties to vaporwave and drone music, but would eventually expand into the realm of dreampunk, releasing albums from some of the community's earliest artists (including Sangam, Renjā, and Origami Girl). On October 17, 2020, Remezcla reported that No Problema Tapes's headquarters had completely burned down. The label was able to resume operations with the help of a fundraiser, compilation album, and by outsourcing tape production to Canada's New Motion label.

Following dreampunk's emergence on labels like Dream Catalogue, No Problema Tapes, BLCR Laboratories, House of the Leg, Virtual Dream Plaza, among others, artists from across the internet began using the term "dreampunk" interchangeably with "dream music". During this time, producers such as Remember, Evryn, CHUNGKING MANSIONS, Facechain, KAGAMI Smile, and THUGWIDOW brought darker cinematic styles to the genre.

In a period of growth, dreampunk artists such as 輕描淡寫 (QMDX) and Sangam were featured alongside Disasterpeace and Merzbow on the now-defunct label, BLUDHONEY RECORDS. In its prime, BLUDHONEY's focus on vinyl and cassettes brought a professional edge to the grassroots movement. Without warning, BLUDHONEY shut down in 2018. Some artists affected by the closure include Rashida Prime, QMDX, and the duo Kuroi Ame. These artists opted to release records on VILL4IN. They would then switch over to Kuroi Ame's PURE LIFE ЧЖ label, which released its first album in September 2018.

The term dreampunk was fully adopted by the community following w u s o 命’s video essay, Dreampunk: The Soundtrack To Dreams, where he analyzed the history and stylistic features of the genre. In the late 2010s, glitch art became a prominent aesthetic for album covers, music videos, and visual albums, as was seen on emerging labels such as PURE LIFE ЧЖ and VILL4IN. During the worldwide COVID-19 lockdown, the genre experienced a resurgence in virtual music festivals, including performances by Livewire, PURE LIVE, and Enter The Void.

== Musical characteristics ==
Dreampunk primarily draws from sounds of the city, science fiction, surrealism, loneliness, love, and dreams. Musicians such as Vangelis, Burial, and Aphex Twin, as well as East Asian cinema and anime, are common inspirations within dreampunk.

Rain is a frequent field recording choice, often used as a callback to the ambience of future-noir film Blade Runner which focuses on palpable atmosphere and worldbuilding rather than plot or action. This concentration on atmosphere gives the music an immersive and dreamlike quality. This quality is further heightened by the frequent use of cassette tapes in recording and distribution.

== See also ==
- Cyberculture
- Synthwave
