= Ryan DeRobertis =

American electronic musician and singer (born 1993)

Skylar Spence
- Also known as: Saint Pepsi; SAINT PEPSI; Skylar Spence; The Cold Napoleons; Cash Wednesday
- Born: Ryan Anthony DeRobertis; February 2, 1991 (age 35)
- Origin: Long Island, New York, United States
- Genres: Future funk; nu-disco; vaporwave; garage house
- Occupations: Record producer; DJ; singer
- Years active: 2012–present
- Labels: Self-released; Fortune 500; Keats Collective; Carpark

Ryan Anthony DeRobertis (known by his stage names Skylar Spence and Saint Pepsi) is an American electronic musician and singer who grew up in Farmingville, New York and attended Boston College for two years studying music. His electronic music project Saint Pepsi began in December 2012. After the release of his ninth studio album Hit Vibes in May 2013, he would retire the Saint Pepsi name due to legal threats from the soft-drink company PepsiCo. He would adopt the name Skylar Spence in 2015, and release his debut record under that moniker, Prom King. In 2019, he would return under the name Saint Pepsi with the release of Mannequin Challenge, and he currently uses that name for live performances and certain releases.

== Career ==
Stereogum named DeRobertis their "band to watch" in July 2013, calling his music "addicting and fun." Pitchfork praised the release of "Mr. Wonderful," the lead track off the 2014 EP Gin City, which was hosted on the music blog Gorilla vs. Bear. In February, Gorilla vs. Bear also hosted the premiere of the track "Baby."

In June 2014, Saint Pepsi went on tour with Painted Palms after signing to Carpark Records, whose roster includes artists such as Beach House, Cloud Nothings, Toro y Moi, and Memory Tapes.

== Style ==
DeRobertis' musical style has been described as being in the categories of future funk, vaporwave, disco-pop, futurepop, liquid disco, slow jam and gibber boogie, although he also borders between traditional music genres. He often incorporates unorthodox sounds in his music, using sources such as the soundtracks from games like Mario Kart 64. He also commonly samples pop songs (such as "Private Caller", which also appeared on the compilation album Portals Summer II, sampled Canadian artist Lustt's 1983 cover of Sylvia Robinson's 1973 track "Pillow Talk").

The Fader calls his nonchalant approach to Top 40 hits "refreshing," and calls his music "restless and nostalgic and sonically curious." He is quoted as saying, "I’m drawn to tuneful melodies; complex chord structures; outlandish synths and drums; and I like to take pop a cappellas and see how I can warp the songs while keeping the melodies almost entirely intact [...] I want to make pop music for freaks, basically."

== Discography ==
=== As The Cold Napoleons ===
- Adversaries (November 16, 2012)

=== As Saint Pepsi ===
==== Albums ====
- Laser Tag Zero (December 27, 2012)
- Triumph International (January 1, 2013)
- New Generation (January 2, 2013)
- World Tour (January 3, 2013)
- Empire Building (January 29, 2013)
- Late Night Delight (split with Luxury Elite) (February 2, 2013)
- Studio 54 (March 7, 2013)
- Winner's Circle (split with ショッピングワールド [Shopping World] jp ) (May 11, 2013)
- Hit Vibes (May 31, 2013)
- Choice Cuts (split with Crowns, Dinosaurus Rex and Harrison) (July 25, 2013)
- New Mount Everest (recorded between January 2017 to October 2018) (December 23, 2018)
- Mannequin Challenge (August 27, 2019)
- SAINT PEPSI Can Suck My #### (recorded 2016) (February 7, 2020)
- Cash Wednesday (July 31, 2023)

==== Deluxe albums ====
- Winner's Circle (SAINT PEPSI Deluxe Edition) (March 20, 2020)

==== Extended plays ====
- Local Singles (December 28, 2013)
- Gin City (February 25, 2014)
- Saint Pepsi Meets the Metallic Ghosts (split with Metallic Ghosts) (November 17, 2014)
- Reflektor (unfinished album) (January 1, 2017)

==== Singles ====
Five Grammies (February 7, 2020)

=== As Skylar Spence ===
==== Studio albums ====
- Prom King (September 18, 2015)

==== Deluxe albums ====
- Prom King Deluxe Ten Year Anniversary Edition (September 19, 2025)

==== Singles ====
- "Fiona Coyne/Fall Harder" (originally released as Saint Pepsi) (August 12, 2014)
- "Polyvinyl 4-Track Singles Series, Vol. 2" (June 1, 2015)
- "Can't You See" (July 7, 2015)
- "Faithfully" (October 10, 2016)
- "Carousel / Cry Wolf" (September 4, 2018)

==== Mixes ====
- Mysteryland (June 15, 2016)
- Alive 2020 (August 26, 2020)
- Alive 2021 (December 3, 2021)
- Almost Butterflies (April 9, 2026)

=== As Amelia Airhorn ===
==== Mixtapes ====
- The Knocks & Skylar Spence Present... Amelia Airhorn (June 19, 2017)

==== Singles ====
- "Miracle" (June 1, 2017)
- "New York is Red Hot" (June 14, 2017)
- "Street Performers Part. II" (June 19, 2017)
