= News at 11 (album) =

- Original artwork

Studio album by Cat System Corp.
- Released: September 11, 2016
- Genres: Mallsoft; smooth jazz; vaporwave; signalwave
- Length: 71:09
- Label: Geometric Lullaby
- Director: CCTV
- Producer: Jornt Elzinga

Cat System Corp. chronology
Sunday Television (2016)	News at 11 (2016)	Luxury Girls (2017)

Alternative cover

News at 11 is the fourteenth studio album by Cat System Corp., the alias of Dutch electronic musician Jornt Elzinga. Released on September 11, 2016, it samples smooth jazz songs and excerpts from TV talk shows and commercials as a tribute to the victims of the September 11 attacks. Inspired by a vaporwave mix featuring a picture of the burning Twin Towers, Elzinga produced News at 11 as a portrayal of "a parallel universe where it never happened." Initially intended to be a Weather Channel-themed release, the album was produced over the course of nine months, and drew comparisons to the themes of author Ottessa Moshfegh's My Year of Rest and Relaxation (2018).

Although the first 9 tracks sample both TV recordings and songs, the latter 11 draw primarily from the Weather Channel transmissions. News at 11 reflects September 11 as a normal day, in a timeline where the towers "proudly stand still." Several elements are named in reference to 9/11, such as the track "8:46 AM" being named after the time when Flight 11 hit the North Tower, and the artwork cover showing the American flag as seen through a plane window. In February 2020, Elzinga released the album on vinyl featuring two bonus tracks, and in September 2021, partnered with filmmaker Indy Advant to create the visual album Liberty Edition.

The record received positive critical and public reviews upon release. Some fans found the album to accurately represent vaporwave's "last breaths" before the fall of the Twin Towers, while critics commented on its reflection of a lost vision of the future as remarkable. News at 11 is the all-time best-selling mallsoft release on Bandcamp, and is often listed as one of Elzinga's most important releases. Its cassette issue also became one of the most demanded releases of the website.

== Background ==
In 2013, Dutch electronic musician Jornt Elzinga began releasing music under the alias Cat System Corp., from which he received acclaim for his vaporwave projects. Elzinga had drawn inspiration from the pop culture and hyperconsumerism of the 1990s, as heard on his 2014 albums Hiraeth and Palm Mall. His first releases featured a style from before the September 11 attacks that would later be the main focus of News at 11. Through 2014 and 2015, Elzinga collaborated with several prominent vaporwave musicians, including Telepath, Donovan Hikiru, and Luxury Elite. By 2016, Elzinga further explored the ambiance of the pre-9/11 era in Class of '84 (2016), a release partly inspired by 1980s media such as Saved by the Bell.

Before the release of News at 11, YouTube user Wav Flv released Reptilian TV, a vaporwave mix featuring an image of the Twin Towers on fire. Although the original video was later deleted, another user re-uploaded it, where Elzinga commented, "Indeed this was the inspiration for News at 11, or at least started the spark of the flame it would become." He had previously revealed his inspiration for News at 11 on the comment section of its unofficial upload by electronic music channel Vapor Memory; responding to a commenter's mention of the mix, Elzinga said, "that's what inspired me in the first place".

== Music and themes ==
"This is the sound of ghosts, not of those who died, but of the culture that died with them. 'Album belongs in a museum', one comment reads, but this album is a museum, recording a world that might never actually have existed."

— Roisin Kiberd

Tracks 1–9 sample TV broadcasts from the early morning of September 11th, 2001, before the attacks took place. The song titles reference American television and elements of 9/11, serving as a tribute to the victims of the attacks. Bandcamp Daily writer Simon Chandler suggested that, as Elzinga's music portrays days of innocence, News at 11 is a release that "finds him trying to reclaim them." Tracks 10–20 focus on reverberated Weather Channel samples, a theme previously explored on Elzinga's Sunday Television (2016). Pad Chennington, a prominent vaporwave artist/reviewer, observed News at 11 as an attempt at emulating a pre-9/11 society, while author James Mahood wrote that the album shows vaporwave as a genre with hauntological capabilities.

The record's exploration of 9/11 was compared by author Roisin Kiberd to Ottessa Moshfegh's 2018 novel My Year of Rest and Relaxation; both explore their subjects' unawareness of the attacks, though News at 11 portrays September 11 as a trivial day in itself. In an interview with Tony Vesalainen, owner of vaporwave record label Cityman Productions, Elzinga said the album represents his attempts at reexperiencing his childhood's peace as an adult. The record is also tied with concepts of capitalism; Kiberd expressed his feelings on News at 11 as "history being flattened, decontextualised and defanged", while Vesalainen felt surprised for the music's calm nature in spite of its themes around an event that shaped contemporaneous American society. In an interview with Elzinga, Japanese author Satoshi Kizawa mentions elevator music as an integral part of the nostalgia-evoking elements found in News at 11. Certain artists and groups are sampled multiple times, including the Rippingtons and Eric Marienthal. In an interview with Tabi Labo, Elzinga mentioned the record as his own form of escapism.

"'Goodmorning America!'"
"'Goodmorning America!'", the opening track of News at 11. Elzinga uses an abrupt cut off from Good Morning America to a sample of the Rippingtons as presenter Diane Sawyer says the date of the attacks.

The opener, "'Goodmorning America!'", abruptly cuts the show's anchor Diane Sawyer as she says the week and month day that the event occurred. The third track, "8:46 AM", presents slowed down drums, a saxophone described by Kiberd as a "death march", and a piano labeled "oppressive" by the author as a WUSA presenter says, "it's kind of quiet around the country [...] it's too quiet" Track 7, "Financial News", features a CNN Daybreak anchor's news about the stock market performance of companies such as Nokia, Motorola and Boeing which, according to Kiberd, ties in with memories of that era's technological advancements. "Tuesday Television" ends with Richard Hack, the author of a book on Howard Hughes, calling Hughes "the most amazing man that America has ever created"; in the original broadcast, the presenter gives the breaking news of 9/11, while the album cuts to "Evening Traffic" and ends tracks 1–9. Describing the Weather Channel portion of the record, Kiberd related the repeated use of the sentence "The extended forecast" to the album's constant postponing of tragedy: "We're near the end now, but the weather's not over yet."

=== Artwork and production ===
Elzinga worked on the album for nine months; at one point, he had a five-hour-long playlist of Weather Channel music, and felt sorry for his girlfriend who listened to it with him while he drove her to places. The artwork features a windy American flag seen through what is determined to be the old logo of the Weather Channel. Vesalainen interpreted it as a CRT TV screen, giving the idea of millions of people watching the attacks on their TVs. He felt the artwork and music were partly contradictory, as the artwork demonstrates aspects of the event explicitly while the music features calm jazz and Weather Channel samples.

== Release and promotion ==
A still from the visual album Liberty Edition, where Al Gore presumably won the 2000 US presidential election

Elzinga initially thought of News at 11 as "a soundtrack for driving to work in the morning". He chose specific tracks he found good enough to be used in a future album, and "took the concept further" by producing a new album tied with the events of the September 11 attacks; he said, "The music in communication with 'ancient' news clips and commercials transports you right back to 2001."

The album was released on September 11, 2016, in the 15-year anniversary of the attacks. Its vinyl and cassette issues were released in February 2020 by independent record labels Geometric Lullaby and Lost Angles, respectively. On September 10, 2021, the day before 9/11's 20th anniversary, Elzinga released the VHS video album News at 11: Liberty Edition issued by label Utopia District, featuring visuals by film maker CCTV for all original tracks.

== Reception and legacy ==
News at 11 received positive reviews from critics upon release, with Simon Chandler opining that Elzinga's "attempt at 'suspended animation,' at freezing history just before a cataclysmic moment" is one of the elements that add emotional weight to the album. Its Lost Angles cassette issue is one of the most demanded physical products in vaporwave community, while its remastered edition is the best-selling mallsoft album of all time on Bandcamp. Elzinga said News at 11, along with other albums of his discography, surprised him for their success, stating, "and here we are doing interviews."

The album's tracks were praised for their subtlety and handling of their themes. Tony Vesalainen described News at 11 as a kind of therapy for those affected by the attacks, and Roisin Kiberd opined of the album as creating "a sense of oncoming revelation", which he said is comparable to "certain drugs". James Mahood, highlighting a YouTube comment, exposed an opinion that 9/11 was the fall of "the not yet born vaporwave culture". Mahood expressed that the pre-9/11 era can only be experienced through media, stating, "News at 11 typifies the entire aesthetic of vaporwave". Pad Chennington, a prominent vaporwave musician and reviewer whose uncle died in the attacks, characterised the album as letting the listener peacefully "travel through that day", and praised the album's exclusion of 9/11 conspiracy theories. Satoshi Kizawa described the record's aspects as implying that a more optimistic vision of the future was lost after 9/11, concluding that News at 11 represents the ghost of that lost future.

== Track listing ==
Adapted from Bandcamp. For tracks 1–9 and 14, bold text highlights the song used; all news broadcasts are from the morning of September 11, 2001. Two additional songs, "New Amsterdam" and "Uptown Algonquin", were added in a 2020 remaster.

News at 11 track listing
No.	Title	Sample(s)	Length
1.	"'Goodmorning America!'"	ABC at 7:01 AM (0:00–0:04) "One Ocean Way" by the Rippingtons (0:04–2:29)	2:29
2.	"Morning Commute"	CNNfn at 8:00 AM (0:00–0:08) "If She Feels That Way" by Richard Tyznik (0:06–2:36)	2:36
3.	"8:46 AM"	"A Very Special Place" by Torcuato Mariano (0:00–3:51); WUSA at 8:31 AM (0:21–0:26)	3:51
4.	"Downtown"	NBC at 8:31 AM (0:00–0:22) "Roadrunner" by Boney James (0:12–2:59)	2:59
5.	"Channel 4"	NBC at 8:42 AM (0:00–0:08) "Wednesday's Child" by the Rippingtons (0:09–3:22)	3:22
6.	"Heli Tours"	"Mr. Cool" by the Crusaders (0:00–2:11); WUSA at 8:31 AM (2:08–2:16)	2:16
7.	"Financial News"	NBC at 8:51 AM (0:00–1:41); NBC at 8:32 AM (1:41–2:10) (Note: Includes 0.5 seconds of NBC at 8:31 AM.) "Both Sides" by Roger Smith (2:11–4:56); CNN at 8:47 AM (4:57–6:43)	6:43
8.	"Tuesday Television"	"Divided Soul" by Jim Horn (0:00–5:51); NBC at 8:50 AM (5:51–7:24)	7:24
9.	"Evening Traffic"	"Where Are You Now" by Dan Siegel	3:46
10.	"THE WEATHER CHANNEL 1"	"Love's the Reason" by 3rd Force	6:22
11.	"THE WEATHER CHANNEL 2"	"Backtalk" by Eric Marienthal	3:27
12.	"THE WEATHER CHANNEL 3"	"Nocturnal Playground" by Russ Freeman	1:45
13.	"THE WEATHER CHANNEL 4"	"Ready for Love" by 3rd Force	4:16
14.	"THE WEATHER CHANNEL 5"	"Who's Holding Her Now" by the Rippingtons (0:00–2:18) "Seguaro" by David Lanz and Paul Speer (2:26–2:29)	2:29
15.	"THE WEATHER CHANNEL 6"	"Midnight Motion" by Kenny G	3:22
16.	"THE WEATHER CHANNEL 7"	"Where It All Begins" by 3rd Force	2:00
17.	"THE WEATHER CHANNEL 8"	"Waiting" by Cliff Sarde	2:13
18.	"THE WEATHER CHANNEL 9"	"Full Circle" by 3rd Force	5:22
19.	"THE WEATHER CHANNEL 10"	"Westland" by Eric Marienthal	2:32
20.	"THE WEATHER CHANNEL 11"	"Club Catamaran" by Network Music Ensemble	1:46
Total length:			1:11:09

== Personnel ==
Credits adapted from Bandcamp.

- Jornt Elzinga – producer
- Angel Marcloid – digital and vinyl master

== See also ==
- The Disintegration Loops (2002–2003), completed in the morning of September 11
- When No Birds Sang
- List of concept albums

September 11 attacks:

- Culture and media
- Opinion polls
