= Cat System Corp. =

Dutch musician (born 1989)

猫 シ Corp.
- Also known as: Mesektet
- Born: Jornt Elzinga; 3 March 1989 (age 37); Netherlands
- Genres: Ambient; mallsoft; vaporwave
- Occupation: Producer
- Instruments: Computer; sampler
- Years active: 2013–present
- Labels: Dream Catalogue; Geometric Lullaby; Hiraeth Records
- Website: catsystemcorp.bandcamp.com

Jornt Elzinga (born 3 March 1989), known professionally as Cat System Corp. (Japanese: 猫 シ Corp., Hepburn: Neko Shi Corp.), is a Dutch musician regarded as a vaporwave figure that originated the mallsoft subgenre. He also previously recorded as Mesektet for his dark ambient releases.

Born in 1989, Elzinga started his music career in the 2000s with drone and noise productions. He began his independent vaporwave career in 2013, and became popular in the scene with his 2014 album Hiraeth. His solo works, including albums such as Palm Mall (2014), Cosmopolitan Dreams (2016), and News at 11 (2016), are known for popularising mallsoft. His collaborations with other musicians also spawned successful albums within the community, including Corporate Mixtape (2014) and Building a Better World (2019).

Elzinga's music explores concepts of late 20th century capitalism, presenting ambient shopping center recordings characteristic of mallsoft. It also portrays specific events, such as an alternate history where the September 11 attacks never happened, or a fictional soundtrack to a retro fashion TV series. In 2019, he founded his own record label, Hiraeth Records. He is one of the best-selling mallsoft artists as of 2022.

== Life and career ==
=== Early life and the September 11 attacks (1989–2001) ===
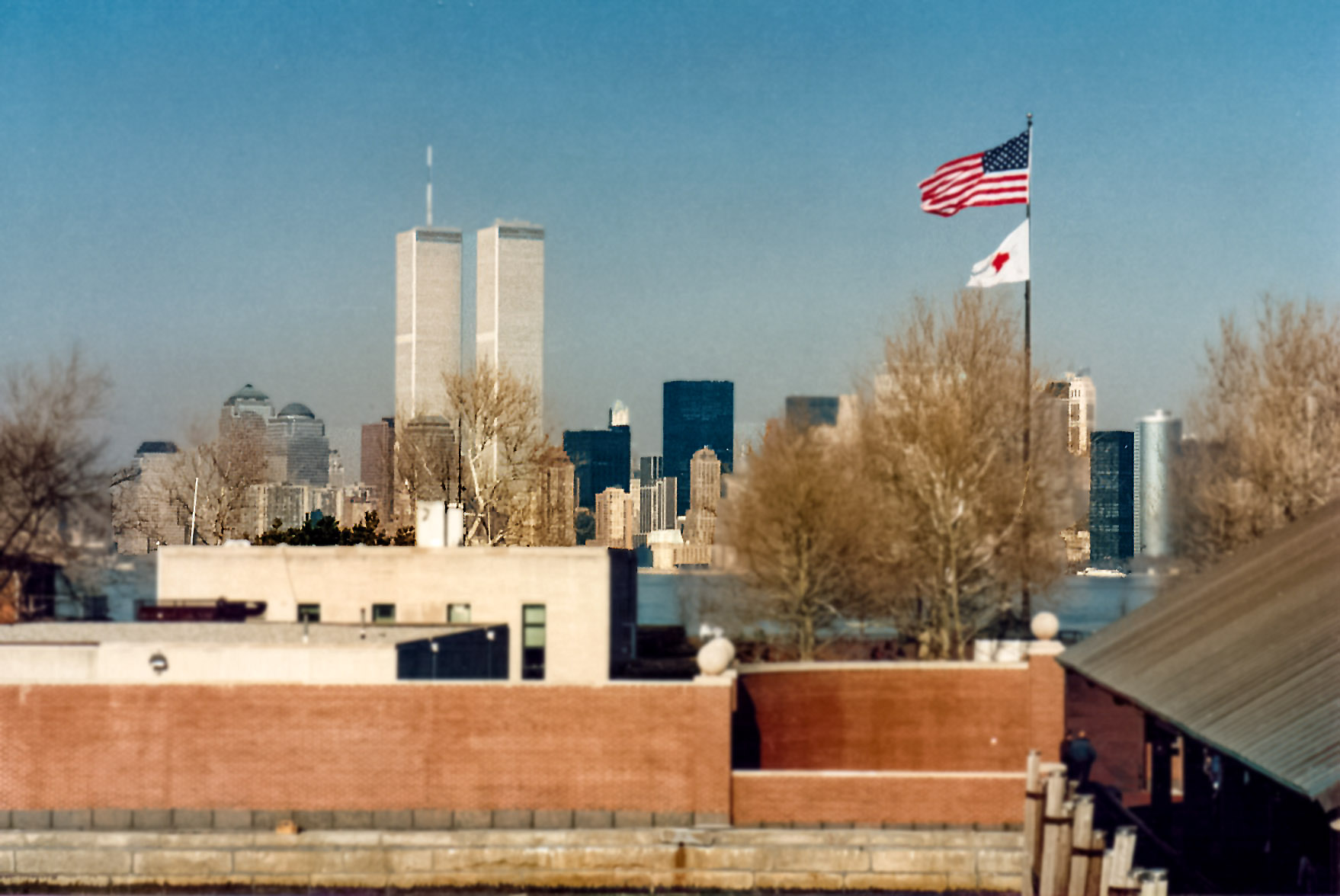
The Twin Towers in 1995

Jornt Elzinga was born in the Netherlands on 3 March 1989. He was influenced by the pop culture of the 1990s and the early 2000s, saying he "witnessed the world's globalization and grew up with slow dial-up Internet." His sister watched TV shows such as Saved by the Bell, which Jornt called "a childhood memory that has been in my mind forever." His dad frequently filmed and took photos as a kid; as Jornt said, "most of my memories from the early 90s are documented."

On 11 September 2001, as Jornt did French homework, his mother desperately called for him to watch the September 11 attacks on TV. In an interview with YouTuber Pad Chennington, Jornt said that although confused, he found the experience surreal, saying "On that date, I think the old world died. You know, that peaceful... world, that American Dream world." The event would greatly influence his future music career; he further explained:

"We have not and will never forget about what happened that day. I like to think there's a parallel universe where it never happened."

=== Early music and discovery of vaporwave (2001–2013) ===
By his mid-teens and with faster access to the Internet, Elzinga discovered more of what he called "weird music," including dark ambient, drone, and noise. He experimented with stretching, field recording, and sampling to create a more narrative feel to his music, as well as transferring his recordings to cassette tape. For releases such as Towards a Bleak Sun (2014), Elzinga recorded under the alias Mesektet.

In 2013, Elzinga wanted to release music on floppy disk but did not know how to do so; searching on Google, he discovered Miami Vice's lofi release Culture Island (2012), an album released on that format. (Note: In 2018, Rolling Stone reported that some within the vaporwave scene began issuing music on floppy; the first one was a 20-copy issue of a Cat System Corp. record.) Elzinga revealed he listened exclusively to vaporwave after initially discovering it; he wanted to start producing it but "had no idea where to start," as he did not have previous knowledge of genres sampled, such as jazz and R&B.

Elzinga wanted to choose an alias name involving cats, and stated that "Corporation" fits the themes he would pursue with his music. He continuously translated names through Google Translate until it read "Cat System Corp." (猫 シ Corp.), a name he found "genius."

=== Mallsoft releases and collaborations (2014–2016) ===
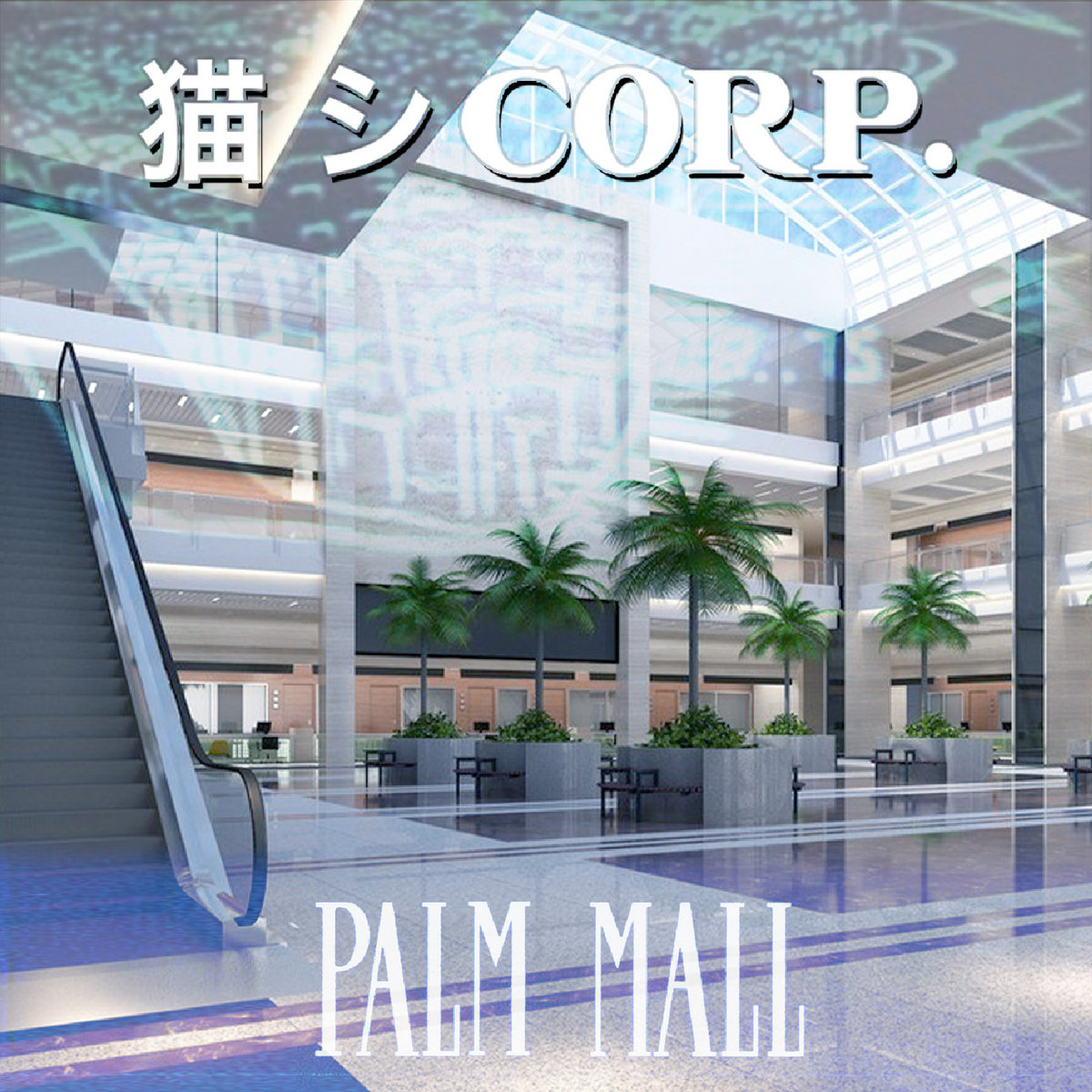
Palm Mall album cover

Elzinga's first successful album, Hiraeth (2014), established him as a vaporwave musician and showed the early Internet culture of his youth within what The Outline's Emma Madden called the "ahistorical placelessness" of vaporwave. It was one of the best-selling vaporwave albums worldwide until July 2014, being called by Bandcamp Daily's Simon Chandler "one of [Elzinga's] standout albums" and by VWMusic's Andrew Daly an influential release on the scene. Late Night Stereo, released in June 2014, was Elzinga's next release, and "just missed the cut" of Fact's listing of July's "essential cassette releases."

Elzinga's next solo album, Palm Mall, was released in late 2014. It was one of the best-selling vaporwave albums worldwide in October 2014 and became Elzinga's most well-known music release, being called a "particularly atmospheric" album by author Samuel Cothron. (Note: The Palm Mall Bandcamp page was shown in a Fact news article about the "first-ever vaporwave mall.")

In 2014, Elzinga collaborated with anonymous musician Telepath on the album Blue Dream, whose musical style was once described as "washed out euphoria" by a reviewer. He also produced Corporate Mixtape with artist Donovan Hikaru in 2015, where he explores futuristic working soundscapes, and created a remix of Luxury Elite's "Strut" for her album World Class.

=== News at 11 and further success (2016–2019) ===
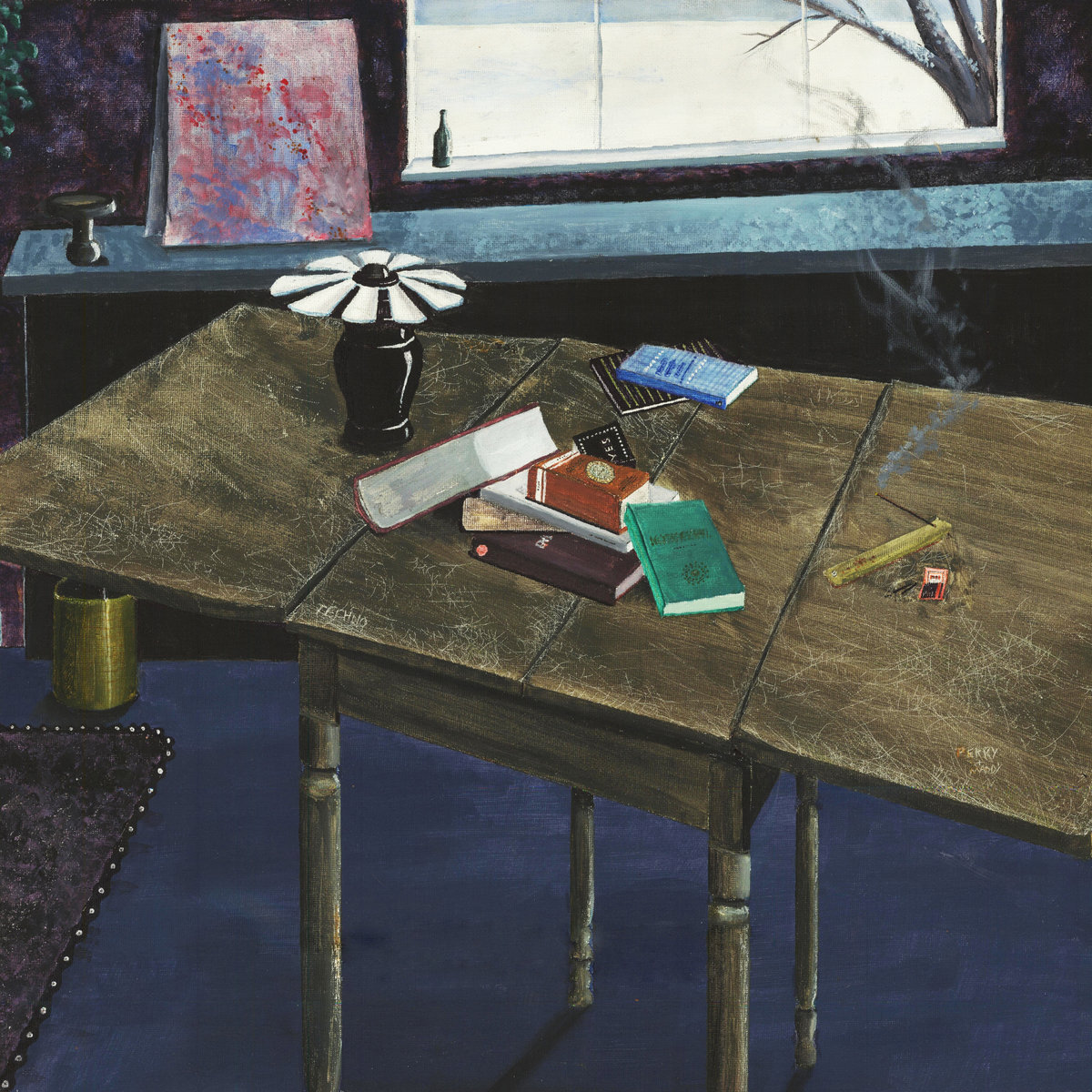
Cover of Memories Overlooked

On 11 September 2016, Elzinga released News at 11, a concept album about the September 11 attacks. The album's number of tracks coincides with the term "9/11"; Side A has 9 tracks, while Side B has 11 tracks. It was recognised within the vaporwave community due to its conceptualisation of 9/11 and exploration of tragedy. It is the second best-selling mallsoft release of all time on Bandcamp, while its October 2021 cassette reissue is considered an "increased demand" product of independent record label Lost Angles.

In 2017, Elzinga collaborated on Memories Overlooked, a tribute release for the Caretaker alias and his album series Everywhere at the End of Time (2016–2019). The album cover of A Class in...' Crypto Currency (2018) was used in an art piece sold as an NFT. Palm Mall Mars, released in 2018, was Elzinga's first mallsoft album to be set on Mars.

=== Hiraeth Records and Building a Better World (2019–present) ===
In early 2019, Elzinga founded his own record label, Hiraeth Records, which made him stop releasing sampled music due to copyright concerns. He was influenced by media such as the Hyperion Cantos and The Matrix (1999), and shifted his focus towards ambient-oriented music notably in his 2025 album, Blueberries On Mars. Artists whose works were released on the label include Disconscious, Zer0, and Tsudio Studio. Later that year, Elzinga's video album of his 2018 release Family. Work. Shop. was exhibited at Brazilian film event Ecrã Festival in Rio de Janeiro.

In July 2019, Elzinga released Building a Better World, a collaboration with anonymous musician Telepath. It was Elzinga's first Telepath collaborative release in three years, and the first album released on Hiraeth Records. It was included on Bandcamp's "essential" ambient listing, being included among works by artists such as Aphex Twin and William Basinski. German metal band Dune described it as creating "these lush atmospheres that evoke some strong imagery of isolation." On January 11, 2022, Elzinga's son was born.

== Impact ==
Elzinga has been a recognised musician within the vaporwave scene for his contributions to mallsoft. Albums such as Hiraeth, Corporate Mixtape, and Palm Mall were praised for their portrayals of 20th-century shopping malls, with Palm Mall being called the definitive mallsoft release and "one of the greatest vaporwave albums of all time." Of Oasys, Jeffrey Howard stated that the album "might save your life, transporting you back to a time when George W. Bush was in office." News at 11, one of the most demanded physical releases within the vaporwave scene, was described by author Roisin Kiberd as a concept album that "interrogates vaporwave, asking if the genre can only be truly appreciated by those who have lost something."

== Artistry ==
=== Influences ===
Elzinga was influenced by artists including Architecture in Tokyo, Luxury Elite, Macintosh Plus, and Telepath. Although he said Architecture in Tokyo and Luxury Elite had an influence on him, calling them "the OGs," Telepath is Elzinga's favorite, as both worked together on several albums. One musician he listened to frequently in 2013 is Toyotaセリカ; although more inactive than others, Elzinga said, "he has some amazing albums." One specific artist sampled on Elzinga's first releases is singer Sade, whose song "Tar Baby" was also sampled on Floral Shoppe.

Video games and films had a lasting influence on Elzinga's music as well. Games such as Grand Theft Auto V (2013) partly inspired him to produce Palm Mall, while films and TV shows such as Vanilla Sky (2001) and The Walking Dead motivated the narrative aspects of and were sampled on his music. In one of his albums, Elzinga included a sample from The Last of Us (2013); according to him in 2018, only one person had ever found it. Black Mesa Research Facility (2017), a collaboration with musician Mezzaluna, was Elzinga's first release to be themed around a video game, Half-Life.

=== Musicianship ===
Elzinga initially produced music with Adobe Premiere and later transitioned into FL Studio, with the consideration of using electronic drums for his live performances. He recalled that News at 11 took nine months to produce, and that Shopping @ Helsinki was his first album to feature original mall recordings. He stated that his origin country, the Netherlands, has smaller-sized shopping centers, which led him to a desire to visualise American-styled malls in his albums.

Elzinga admitted not having any formal music education and not being able to write or read musical notation. Although featuring instruments such as saxophones in many of his songs, he only samples existing 1980s and 90s jazz. He said he began his music career selecting specific ambient works, stating that "everyone can make it." Referencing Floral Shoppe, he jokingly said, "It's only slowed down Diana Ross, right?"

About his collaborative process, Elzinga maintains contact with many other vaporwave musicians, including Luxury Elite and Vaperror. He produced albums such as Building a Better World with Telepath by continuously emailing audio files to each other, similarly to the production process of 2814's Rain Temple (2016).

=== Music and genres ===
Genres explored by Elzinga's music include vaporwave, mallsoft, lofi, smooth jazz, and ambient. Palm Mall features two widely differing sides: the ambient sounds of the first 20 minutes are featured in one single eponymous track, while the last 20 minutes present tracks with lengths closer to traditional vaporwave albums. Elzinga's Bandcamp page includes visual influences of synthwave and chillwave, such as pastel colors and pixel art palm trees. Regarding album covers, writer Estivalet Raymundo noted that the artwork for Palm Mall represented Elzinga's portrayal of "the mall" as a flawless but false space. The cover of 2016's Cosmopolitan Dreams continued this trend, of which Simon Chandler stated, "since the images are often computer-generated and artificial, ... this sense of limitlessness is a fantasy."

"Palm Mall"
Palm Mall's eponymous track; Miguel Principe described it as "complete with samples of announcements from department stores and faint conversations to emulate passersby."

"'Goodmorning America!'"
"'Goodmorning America!'", a track from the 2016 album News at 11. It cuts off to smooth jazz as Good Morning America anchor Diane Sawyer says the date of the attacks: "Tuesday, Septem[ber 11th, 2001]."

With Palm Mall, Elzinga "constructed ... a virtual soundscape of visiting the mall" with tracks such as "Special Discount" and "First Floor", according to Paul Ballam-Cross of the Journal of Popular Music Studies. To critic Miguel Principe, the album's 20-minute-long eponymous track "simulates a walk through a mall," giving it a "background feel" that differs from other mallsoft releases. With Oasys (2015), writer Jeffrey Howard commented that Elzinga developed the alias "from a warm and grainy sound to a cold and cacophonous one." In 2015's Class of '84, Elzinga portrays a 1980s graduation classroom, while Sandrawave (2016) samples exclusively from works by German singer Sandra. Shopping @ Helsinki directs an elevator music style as opposed to melancholic feelings, and was highlighted by researchers for this, along with Palm Mall and Oasys.

In News at 11, Elzinga's vision of 9/11 draws mainly from 1980s and '90s smooth jazz songs. The Weather Channel tracks compose the latter half of the album, of which Elzinga at one point in production had a five-hour-long playlist. Most of the beginning tracks are interspersed with TV broadcast clips from the morning before the attacks, ranging from CarMax commercials in "Financial News", a recording of The Today Show in "Downtown", and Good Morning America on the opener of the same name.

In Lofi (2017), Elzinga shows a more lofi-oriented direction to his music, while Luxury Girls (2017) explores '90s retro fashion interspersed with interview clips to create a fictional soundtrack of a typical TV show from the time. Palm Mall Mars serves as a "sequel" to the original Palm Mall, and was Elzinga's last mallsoft release. The visual version of Family. Work. Shop. was filmed on cassette, and features original recordings from Elzinga. Building a Better World creates an atmosphere of optimism that Poppel Yang of Chinese website Biede described as a less dystopian version of 2814's Birth of a New Day (2015). The album's title track is composed of a rhythm that at times focuses on certain elements of the ambiance, which Bandcamp Daily's Ari Delaney felt created "the perfect soundtrack for a neon metropolis."

== Discography ==
Studio albums

- Hi-Fi (2013)
- スタートキーを押し (2013)
- Yuki (2013)
- Late Night Stereo (2014)
- Hiraeth (2014)
- Palm Mall (2014)
- アウディAudi (2015)
- Oasys (2015)
- Sandrawave (2016)
- Shopping @ Helsinki (2016)
- Class of '84 (2016)
- Cosmopolitan Dreams (2016)
- Sunday Television (2016)
- News at 11 (2016)
- Luxury Girls (2017)
- A Class in...' Crypto Currency (2018)
- Family. Work. Shop. (2018)
- Palm Mall Mars (2018)
- Blueberries on Mars (2025)
- She Dreamed of Earth (2026)

Collaborations

- Ocean Beach with Stereo Component (2014)
- Miami Cats with Sephora脳バイブス (2014)
- テレパシーの with t e l e p a t h テレパシー能力者 (2014)
- Blue Dream with Telepath (2014)
- Corporate Mixtape with Donovan Hikaru (2014)
- School Days with Pocari ステューシー (2015)
- Double Date with Syllabus (2015)
- ...With Love 愛を込めて with Waterfront Dining (2015)
- CRS 3.0 with Donovan Hikaru (2017)
- Black Mesa Research Facility with Mezzaluna (2017)
- Building a Better World with Telepath (2019)
- Tomorrow's Forecast with Alternate Skies (2020)

EPs

- Oasys✓✓✓☞❐計算 ソフトウェア (2016)
- [지오 프론트] v3.1 (2016)
- Lofi (2017)

Live

- Los Angeles (2019)
- Leeuwarden (2020)
- "Nighttime Live!" (2021)
- Live In London (2023)

Compilations

- a:/ スタートキーを押し (2017)
- 太陽。慰安。楽園。/ The Future Is Here (2017)

Video albums

- Family. Work. Shop. VHS (2018)
- News at 11: Liberty Edition (2021)

== See also ==
- Daniel Lopatin
- Dead mall
- James Ferraro
- William Basinski
- Quiet storm
