= Yellow Swans discography =

- EPs: 15
- Compilation albums: 3
- Singles: 7
- Full: 45

The discography of Portland, Oregon-based experimental music band Yellow Swans consists of 45 albums, 15 EPs, 3 compilation albums, and 7 singles, as well as appearing on various artist releases. Of the 70 releases by the band, 25 are either in collaboration with other artists or splits. Many of the band's albums have been released under variations of their name, including Dove Yellow Swans, Descension Yellow Swans, Detestifi Yellow Swans, Deterioration Yellow Swans, and Dreamed Yellow Swans, et cetera.

19 of Yellow Swans' releases are recorded-live albums, notably the 3 part Live During War Crimes series published by the label Release the Bats. Their music has been released mainly through their own label, Collective Jyrk, as well as by Weird Forest and LOAD, among others. Additionally, several records were archived by the Yellow Swans Archive in 2020 and 2021, three of them, Going Places (2010), Being There (2010) and Drowner (2007) having had vinyl reissues as well as digital downloadable copies.

== Full albums ==
| Title | Release year | Released as... | Released under a label (Y/N) | Label | Collab/Split (Y/N) | Recorded Live | Format | Collab/Split Artist |
|---|---|---|---|---|---|---|---|---|
| EPX | 2002 | Yellow Swans | No | - | No | No | CD-R | - |
| PDX TRPDX | 2002 | Yellow Swans | No | - | No | No | CD-R | - |
| Portland Tropics | 2002 | Yellow Swans | No | - | No | No | CD-R | - |
| Free Detained Yellow Swans | 2002 | Yellow Swans | Yes | Jyrk | No | No | CD-R | - |
| Manik Tiks | 2002 | Disk Yellow Swans | Yes | Jyrk | No | No | CD-R | - |
| Live at Kimo's | 2002 | Yellow Swans | No | - | No | Yes | CD-R | - |
| Gnrl Motor Skills/PA Swans | 2002 | Yellow Swans | No | - | No | Yes | CD-R | - |
| Dark Yellow Swans | 2003 | Dark Yellow Swans | Yes | Folding Cassettes | No | No | C20 Cassette | - |
| Detestifi Yellow Swans | 2003 | Detestifi Yellow Swans | Yes | Jyrk | No | No | CD-R | - |
| Dosed Yellow Swans | 2003 | Dosed Yellow Swans | Yes | Since 1972 | No | No | C30 Cassette | - |
| Duh Yellow Swans | 2003 | Duh Yellow Swans | Yes | Jyrk | No | No | CD-R | - |
| Against Sleep and Nightmare | 2003 | Dyad Yellow Swans | Yes | Jyrk | No | No | CD-R | - |
| Deep Yellow Swans | 2003 | Deep Yellow Swans | Yes | Jyrk | No | Yes | CD-R | - |
| Get The US Out Of A | 2004 | Dusk Yellow Swans | Yes | Jyrk | No | No | C30 Cassette | - |
| Bring the Neon War Home | 2004 | Yellow Swans | Yes | Narnack | No | No | CD | - |
| Noggin/Yellow Swans | 2004 | Yellow Swans | Yes | Exploder | Yes | No | C45 Cassette | Noggin |
| Drill Yellow Swans | 2004 | Drill Yellow Swans | Yes | SNSE | No | Yes | CD-R | - |
| Drift Yellow Swans | 2005 | Drift Yellow Swans | Yes | Root Strata | No | No | Vinyl | - |
| Psychic Secession | 2005 | Yellow Swans | Yes | Numerical Thief | No | No | CD | - |
| MLK Day | 2005 | D. Yellow Swans | Yes | Jyrk | Yes | No | CD-R | Axolotl; Gerritt |
| Copper/Silver | 2005 | Yellow Swans | Yes | Jyrk | Yes | No | CD-R | Grey Daturas |
| Dreamed Yellow Swans | 2005 | Dreamed Yellow Swans | Yes | PACrec | No | Yes | CD | - |
| War | 2005 | Demonic Yellow Swans | Yes | Hung Like A Horse?! | No | Yes | CD-R | - |
| Live at Sound & Fury | 2005 | Yellow Swans | Yes | Sound & Fury | No | Yes | CD-R | - |
| Yellow Swans & Birchville Cat Motel | 2006 | Yellow Swans | Yes | Important | Yes | No | CD | Bitchville Cat Motel |
| Live During War Crimes | 2006 | Dove Yellow Swans | Yes | Release the Bats | No | Yes | CD | - |
| Live During War Crimes #2 | 2006 | Dove Yellow Swans | Yes | Release the Bats | No | Yes | CD | - |
| Psychedelic Used Car Lot Blues | 2006 | Yellow Swans | Yes | Memoirs Of An Aesthete | Yes | Yes | CD-R | Ashtray Navigations |
| Axolotl/Yellow Swans | 2006 | Yellow Swans | Yes | Jyrk | Yes | Yes | CD-R | Axolotl |
| They Do Not Always Remember | 2006 | Yellow Swans | Yes | Oedipus | Yes | Yes | CD | Moth Drakula |
| Drowner Yellow Swans | 2007 | Drowner Yellow Swans | Yes | Tape Room | No | No | C62 Cassette | - |
| At All Ends | 2007 | Yellow Swans | Yes | Load | No | No | CD | - |
| Deterioration Yellow Swans | 2007 | Deterioration Yellow Swans | No | - | No | No | C60 Cassette | - |
| Yellow Swans & Burning Star Core | 2007 | Yellow Swans | Yes | Blossoming Noise | Yes | Yes | Vinyl | Burning Star Core |
| Conan Island | 2008 | Yellow Swans | Yes | Weird Forest | Yes | No | Vinyl | Mouthus |
| Ex-Cocaine / Yellow Swans | 2008 | Yellow Swans | Yes | Not Not Fun | Yes | No | Vinyl | Ex-Cocaine |
| Live On Conan Island | 2008 | Yellow Swans | Yes | No-Fi | Yes | Yes | Vinyl | Mouthus |
| Public Space | 2009 | Yellow Swans | Yes | En/Of | No | No | Vinyl | - |
| Mort Aux Vaches | 2009 | Yellow Swans | Yes | Mort Aux Vaches | No | No | CD | - |
| Portable Dunes | 2009 | Yellow Swans | Yes | Helicopter | Yes | No | CD | John Wiese |
| Live During War Crimes #3 | 2009 | Dove Yellow Swans | Yes | Release the Bats | No | Yes | CD | - |
| Going Places | 2010 | Yellow Swans | Yes | Type | No | No | CD | - |
| Split | 2011 | Yellow Swans | Yes | Black Horizons | Yes | No | Vinyl | Oakeater |
| Live Tarcento May 18 2007 | 2012 | Yellow Swans | Yes | Hybrida | No | Yes | CD-R | - |
| Two Sides of California | - | Yellow Swans | Yes | RRRecords | Yes | No | Vinyl | Amps for Christ |

== Extended plays ==
| Title | Release year | Released as... | Released under label (Y/N) | Label | Collab/Split (Y/N) | Recorded Live | Type | Collab/Split Artist |
|---|---|---|---|---|---|---|---|---|
| Ded Yellow Swans | 2002 | Ded Yellow Swans | Yes | Jyrk | No | No | CD-R | - |
| Live in the Men's & Women's Restroom | 2003 | Die Yellow Swans | Yes | Deathbomb Arc | Yes | No | CD-R | Gang Wizard |
| Psychedelic Casualties | 2003 | Die Yellow Swans | Yes | Jyrk | Yes | No | Vinyl | John Wiese |
| Live in the Police State Capitol | 2004 | Demos Yellow Swans | Yes | Weird Forest | No | Yes | Vinyl | - |
| Humming Latice Flowers | 2004 | Yellow Swans | Yes | Jyrk | Yes | No | CD-R | The Skaters |
| Live at Camp Blood | 2005 | Yellow Swans | Yes | Troniks | Yes | Yes | CD | The Cherry Point |
| Drowning Yellow Swans | 2005 | Drowning Yellow Swans | Yes | Carbon | Yes | No | CD-R | Jim Altieri |
| Australian Tour EP | 2005 | Yellow Swans | Yes | Heathen Skulls | Yes | No | CD-R | Grey Daturas |
| Damaged Yellow Swans | 2005 | Damaged Yellow Swans | Yes | 23 Productions | No | No | C20 Cassette | - |
| Declawed Yellow Swans | 2005 | Declawed Yellow Swans | Yes | Tone Filth | No | No | C20 Cassette | - |
| Doorendoorslechte Yellow Swans | 2005 | Doorendoorslechte | Yes | Ultra Eczema | No | No | CD | - |
| Drowned Yellow Swans | 2005 | Drowned Yellow Swans | Yes | Chondritic Sound | No | No | CD-R | - |
| Yeh Yellow Swans | 2005 | Yeh Yellow Swans | Yes | Jyrk | No | No | CD-R | - |
| Damned Yellow Swans | 2006 | Damned Yellow Swans | Yes | Fuck It Tapes | No | No | C20 Cassette | - |
| Descension Yellow Swans | 2007 | Descension Yellow Swans | Yes | Acuarela | No | Yes | CD | - |

== Compilation albums ==
| Title | Release year | Released as... | Released under label (Y/N) | Label | Collab/Split (Y/N) | Recorded Live | Type | Collab/Split Artist |
|---|---|---|---|---|---|---|---|---|
| Live During War Crimes | 2006 | Dove Yellow Swans | Yes | Release the Bats | No | Yes | CD | - |
| Global Clone | 2006 | Doubled Yellow Swans | Yes | PACrec | No | No | CD | - |
| Being There | 2020 | Yellow Swans | Yes | Yellow Swans Archive | No | No | Vinyl | - |

== Singles ==
| Title | Release year | Released as... | Released under label (Y/N) | Label | Collab/Split (Y/N) | Recorded Live | Type | Collab/Split Artist |
|---|---|---|---|---|---|---|---|---|
| Decapitation Yellow Swans | 2003 | Decapitation Yellow Swans | Yes | Das Fort | No | No | Vinyl | - |
| Basement Ghost / Castle EVP | 2004 | Dynasty Yellow Swans | Yes | Helicopter | Yes | No | Vinyl | John Wiese |
| Draught Yellow Swans | 2005 | Draught Yellow Swans | Yes | Deathbomb Arc | No | No | Vinyl | - |
| Split | 2006 | Yellow Swans | Yes | Modern Radio | Yes | No | Vinyl | Devillock |
| Warmth / Yellow Swans | 2007 | Yellow Swans | Yes | DNT | Yes | No | Vinyl | Warmth |
| Tremor Deliverance | 2007 | Yellow Swans | Yes | Arbor | Yes | No | Vinyl | Robedoor |
| Split | 2007 | Yellow Swans | Yes | Not Not Fun | Yes | No | Vinyl | The Goslings |
