= A Shadow in Time =

Studio album by William Basinski
- Released: January 20, 2017
- Studios: 2062 (Los Angeles, California)
- Genres: Ambient, drone
- Length: 43:18
- Labels: 2062; Temporary Residence
- Producer: William Basinski

William Basinski chronology
Cascade (2015)	A Shadow in Time (2017)	Selva Oscura (2018)

A Shadow in Time is an album by American avant-garde composer William Basinski. It was released on January 20, 2017, by 2062 Records and Temporary Residence Limited.

== Background and composition ==
"[It] reminded me of "Subterraneans" off the B-side of Low, and so it became my elegy for David Bowie. It almost evokes a New Orleans funeral to me in a strange way."

— William Basinski, Fact

Basinski began writing the piece "A Shadow in Time" shortly after finishing his album Cascade (2015). After a year of working on the piece, in January 2016, he heard about the death of David Bowie from his friends. A week after he died, Basinski began work on a tribute track for Bowie titled "For David Robert Jones" ("David Bowie" was a stage name; the musician's legal name was David Robert Jones).

The track uses a combination of two cat-chewed tape loops, one being an orchestral tape that initially was planned to be edited after finishing The Disintegration Loops (2002), and a saxophone tape which Basinski found to be similar to Bowie's 1977 album Low. Both tapes were recorded onto a 5-inch reel-to-reel tape deck. After completing "For David Robert Jones," Basinski used it as a "catalyst" in how he would make "A Shadow in Time." Bits of the track are subtly woven into the beginning and end of "For David Robert Jones." "A Shadow in Time" features Basinski working with a Voyetra-8 synthesizer, which he last used on his 2001 album Watermusic. A promotional piece described the composition as a "captivating assemblage of plaintive drones and exquisite melodies".

"For David Robert Jones" was originally commissioned for a performance at Los Angeles gallery Volume, but it never made an appearance at the gallery because, as Basinski explained, "you can’t have a loop on a deck for three days. No one knows how to deal with them, and I would’ve had to been there and I couldn’t so... that’s how it happened!" A Shadow in Time was premiered by Basinski at Union Chapel in London, England on February 23, 2016.

== Artwork ==
The album artwork features, courtesy of James Elaine, a photograph by Chinese artist Deng Tai. The photograph is part of a collection of photographs displayed at Telescope Gallery in Beijing. The photograph is of a near-naked Chinese man holding a blood orange satin cloth and wearing make-up similar to that of Chinese opera stars. Taken on a street in Beijing, the photo is obscured by a motion blur.

== Critical reception ==
Professional ratings
Aggregate scores
Source	Rating
AnyDecentMusic?	8/10
Metacritic	84/100
Review scores
Source	Rating
AllMusic	3.5/5 stars
The A.V. Club	B+
Drowned in Sound	8/10
Exclaim!	9/10
The Observer	4/5 stars
Pitchfork	7.9/10
PopMatters	8/10 stars
Slant Magazine	4/5 stars
Tiny Mix Tapes	4/5 marks
Uncut	8/10

A Shadow in Time received acclaim from music critics. Jonathan Wroble from Slant Magazine wrote, "Together, these two tracks show that Basinski's technique can yield a wide range of results, something his career has proven beyond doubt but which his individual albums don't always reveal. And as irreconcilable as the concept of writing a eulogy based on loops might first appear (since loops are theoretically designed to never die), a deeper read and thorough listen suggests the opposite: Just like a lifetime, especially one as captivating as David Bowie's, Basinski's loops on A Shadow in Time make their way toward discernable endpoints—but not before suggesting they might go on forever." AllMusic critic Paul Simpon said, "As ever, Basinski is a master at suspending time, and the album seems to flow by faster than the clock indicates. When it does end, you wonder if you've been taken somewhere, or if you've been changed in some way. The only key to answering these questions is to dive back in."

=== Accolades ===
Publication	Accolade	Rank	Ref.
Crack	The Top 100 Albums of 2017	18	
Drowned in Sound	Favourite Albums of 2017	50	
Pitchfork	The 20 Best Experimental Albums of 2017	7	

== Track listing ==
All tracks are written by William Basinski.

No.	Title	Length
1.	"A Shadow in Time"	22:59
2.	"For David Robert Jones"	20:19
Total length:		43:18

== Personnel ==
Credits adapted from A Shadow in Time album liner notes.

- William Basinski – primary artist
- Preston Wendel – engineering
- Denis Blackham – mastering
- Richard Chartier – design
- Deng Tai – photography
