= The Deluge (William Basinski album) =

Studio album by William Basinski
- Released: April 28, 2015
- Genre: Ambient
- Length: 37:56
- Label: 2062, Temporary Residence

William Basinski chronology
Cascade (2015)	The Deluge (2015)	A Shadow in Time (2017)

The Deluge is a studio album by American musician William Basinski. It was released on April 28, 2015, through 2062 Records and Temporary Residence Limited.

== Background ==
William Basinski is an American musician. The Deluge is a companion album to Cascade (2015). It contains three tracks: "The Deluge", "The Deluge (The Denouement)", and "Cascade". In an e-mail to The Fader, Basinski stated, "Where Cascade is like an object or organism to me, The Deluge is more like a narrative film in 3 acts if you will."

== Release ==
Cascade and The Deluge were originally released on April 28, 2015, through 2062 Records and Temporary Residence Limited. A digital download of The Deluge comes with purchases of Cascade. The vinyl edition of The Deluge was later released on August 7, 2015, through Temporary Residence Limited.

== Critical reception ==
Professional ratings
Review scores
Source	Rating
Drowned in Sound	7/10
The Line of Best Fit	8/10
Pitchfork	7.4/10
Resident Advisor	3.3/5
Spectrum Culture	3.75/5

Brian Coney of The Line of Best Fit stated, "While some previous releases have felt more momentous and genre-defining, The Deluge feels like a necessary purgative journey, where the past is almost due a writing credit." Ian Maleney of Resident Advisor wrote, "The Deluge seems like a late-night record, one that breezes in and out of perception while you ruminate on other thoughts." He called the album "graceful, sad and, in the right context, beautiful."

=== Accolades ===
Year-end lists for The Deluge
Publication	List	Rank	Ref.
The Wire	Releases of the Year (2015 Rewind)	50	

== Track listing ==
The Deluge track listing
No.	Title	Length
1.	"The Deluge"	20:06
2.	"The Deluge (The Denouement)"	6:28
3.	"Cascade"	11:22
Total length:		37:56

== Personnel ==
Credits adapted from liner notes.

- William Basinski – piano, tape loops
- Preston Wendel – engineering
- Denis Blackham – mastering
- James Elaine – drawing
- Richard Chartier – design
