= Palm Mall =

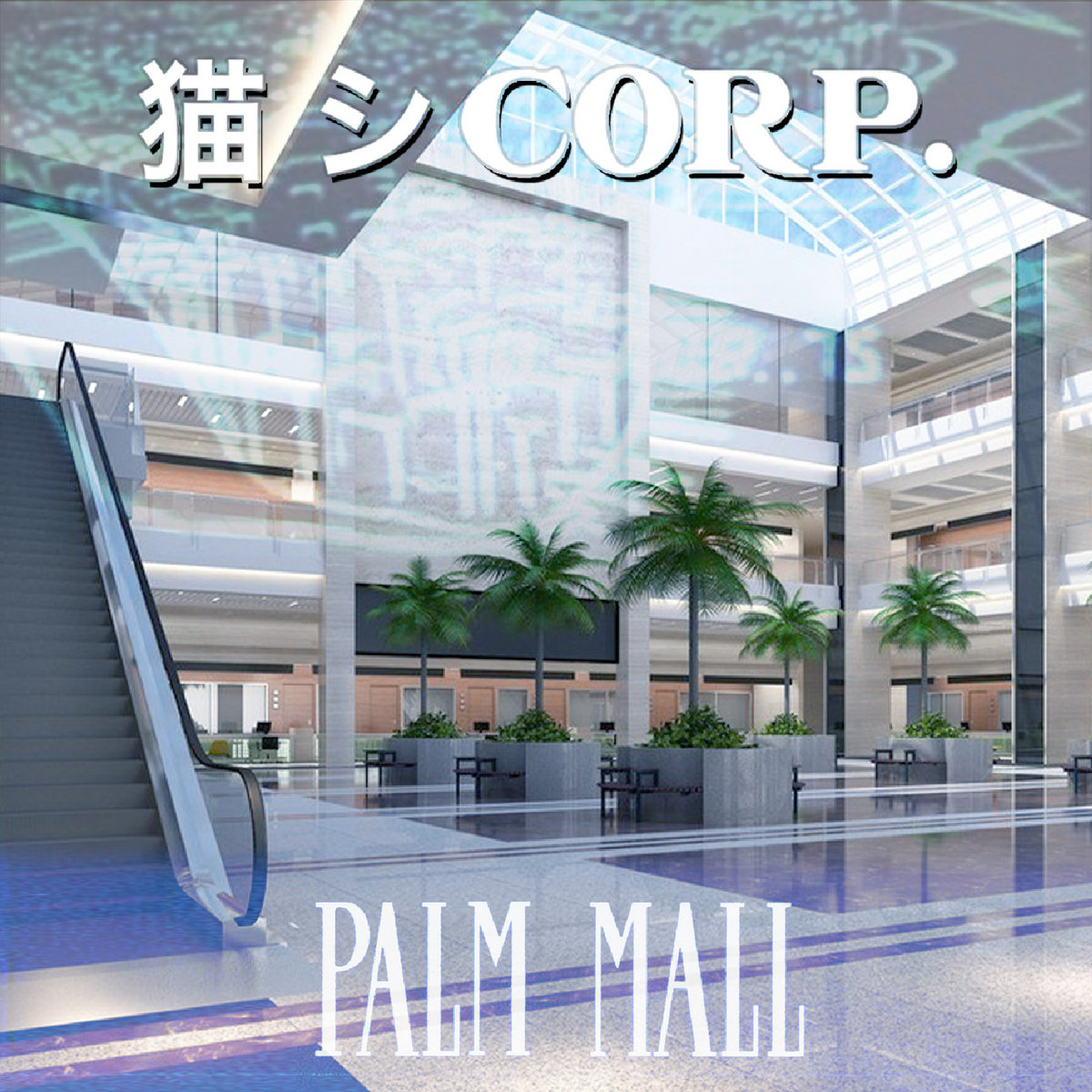

Studio album by Cat System Corp.
- Released: 2 October 2014
- Genre: Ambient; mallsoft; vaporwave
- Length: 44:48
- Label: No Problema Tapes
- Producer: Jornt Elzinga

Cat System Corp. chronology
Blue Dream (2014)	Palm Mall (2014)	Corporate Mixtape (2014)

Audio
- "Palm Mall": file; help

Palm Mall is the sixth studio album by Cat System Corp., the alias of Dutch electronic musician Jornt Elzinga. Released on 2 October 2014, its nine tracks use samples of elevator music to explore shopping malls. Following the success of Hiraeth (2014), Elzinga drew inspiration from the "vaporwave vibe" he felt in the video game Grand Theft Auto V (2013), and produced Palm Mall as his first "serious try" at a mallsoft release. It was a turning point for Elzinga's music and is his favorite release of the Cat System Corp. discography, featuring participation of several other vaporwave musicians.

The first track comprises 20 minutes of music, sampling a range of material and being characterised by an ambient style. Tracks 2–9 are shorter and feature other types of samples. All tracks reflect the ambiance of a mall, as well as themes of capitalism and consumerism. Elzinga later continued with the concept of Palm Mall in Shopping @ Helsinki (2016) and Palm Mall Mars (2018). The record was featured on an article about a "vaporwave mall", and its repetition of source material was compared by Elzinga to the Wilhelm scream.

Palm Mall received generally favorable reviews from critics; its ambiance and themes led many to describe it as ambiguous in its portrayal of consumerism. Considered Elzinga's most successful release, Palm Mall peaked as one of the best-selling vaporwave albums on Bandcamp. It has been called the "definitive mallsoft release" by multiple writers, and is generally considered an influence in the development of the vaporwave scene.

== Background ==
In 2014, Dutch musician Jornt Elzinga started alias Cat System Corp. for releasing vaporwave music after discovering the genre. (Note: He also recorded as Mesektet prior to adopting the pseudonym.) Elzinga was inspired by his nostalgia from the world before the September 11 attacks, a concept later explored on his 2016 album News at 11. He was influenced by musicians such as Macintosh Plus and Luxury Elite. In 2014, Elzinga released Hiraeth, which received praise from the vaporwave community. He felt inspired to produce Palm Mall after hearing the Jay Rock song "Hood Gone Love It" in Grand Theft Auto V, describing the video game itself as "GTA Vaporwave".

== Music and style ==
The tracks, which Elzinga says explore "the concept of Muzak mixed with modern sound and popular Internet culture", present themes of embracing capitalism, and portray the ambient sound of shopping malls. Bandcamp Daily suggested that, as a record derived from Elzinga's nostalgia, Palm Mall "finds [the] clearest expression" of the "glorification of the unreal". The tracks feature electronic production in Adobe Premiere mixed with sample-based ambiance; music magazine Fact mentioned the album in an article about the "first vaporwave mall". Author Samuel Cothron praised Palm Mall's reach into vaporwave's "ironic zenith", while vaporwave publication VWMusic wrote that the album serves as "a proverbial gateway" for new listeners.

The album's sampling of mall sounds was compared to The Orchards (2019) by North Shore Memory Gardens, although its more casual electronic sound differs from the cavernous tone of other works by Elzinga. Writer Ícaro Estivalet Raimund said the artwork, created digitally by musician CVLTVRE, presents the artificiality of an ideal mall, and "plays" with real representations we have of shopping centers. The ambient style of the 20-minute long eponymous first track features samples that repeat constantly, particularly a man saying "I'm gonna grab my laptop and put it over here", which Elzinga compared to the Wilhelm scream. In the last eight tracks, lengths range from two to nearly five minutes, with the last track featuring an audio clip from a Newmarket North Mall TV commercial.

== Critical reception ==
Palm Mall received generally positive reactions upon release, with one writer exemplifying its focus on shopping malls as symbolising mallsoft's exploration of "consumerism emblematic of the past". In October 2014, it peaked as the 24th best-selling vaporwave album on Bandcamp. In interviews, Elzinga stated his favorite release of the Cat System Corp. discography is Palm Mall, and along with Hiraeth, are "some of my best". He later released two albums with similar themes, Shopping @ Helsinki (2016) and Palm Mall Mars (2018).

The album was praised for its portrayal of shopping malls, particularly in its first track. Author Miguel Principe highlighted the composition's sampling of advertisements and conversations as giving it a "background music" style. He found the record's existence within the vaporwave community as an example of music "manipulated to a degree that is both recognizable of its past roots yet remarkably separate from its source material". Samuel Cothron, while describing the mallsoft genre, considered Palm Mall "so pleasant and warm" in its interpretation of mall culture, although also regarding this as occurring "maybe only because our society has normalized the fetishization of shopping".

== Track listing ==
Adapted from Bandcamp. Total length and note adapted from Vapor Memory's YouTube upload and WayBack Machine archives, respectively.

Palm Mall track listing
No.	Title	Part.	Length
1.	"Palm Mall"		22:22
2.	"Endless 通路"	CVLTVRE	3:27
3.	"Special Discount" (removed from Bandcamp at some point between May and July 2020)		1:56
4.	"First Floor"		2:19
5.	"Congratulatory Message"	Patrol1993	2:04
6.	"Second Floor"		2:04
7.	"I consume, therefore I am"		2:36
8.	"Employees Only"	GōsutoMall	2:36
9.	"Veni, Vidi, Emi"		4:56
Total length:			44:48

== Personnel ==
Adapted from cassette liner notes.

- Jornt Elzinga – producer
- Stephen Malet – artwork

== See also ==
- Memories Overlooked, a collaboration album with a Cat System Corp. track titled "Palm Mall"
