= The Disintegration Loops =

2002–2003 album series by William Basinski

- The cover for the first installment

Studio album series by William Basinski
- Released: 2002–2003
- Recorded: July–August 2001 (Note: Multiple sources state Basinski finished The Disintegration Loops on September 11, but he has stated this range of time as when he recorded it.)
- Studios: Arcadia, Brooklyn, New York
- Genres: Experimental; drone; ambient; tape
- Length: 296:24
- Label: 2062

William Basinski chronology
| Watermusic (2000) | The Disintegration Loops (2002–2003) | The River (2002) |

The Disintegration Loops is a series of four albums by the American ambient musician William Basinski, released in 2002 to 2003 on Basinski's label 2062. Made from looping magnetic tapes that sampled earlier recordings, each track's loop decays, creating an ambient and drone soundscape.

In the 1970s, Basinski studied avant-garde music at university, including musicians such as the American composer John Cage, and recorded his first tape experiments. He recorded The Disintegration Loops between July and August 2001. After he witnessed the collapse of the World Trade Center from his Brooklyn apartment during the September 11 attacks, he dedicated the series to the victims of the attacks.

The Disintegration Loops received positive reviews and is considered a significant work in ambient and electronic music. It popularized Basinski, establishing him as an avant-garde musician. In 2012, its tenth anniversary, the electronic music label Temporary Residence reissued and remastered The Disintegration Loops for its introduction into the National September 11 Memorial & Museum with additional material. Temporary Residence remastered it again in 2025 as The Disintegration Loops (Arcadia Archive Edition).

== Background and recording ==
During William Basinski's time in the University of North Texas in the 1970s, he learned about avant-garde music, including the works of John Cage and recording music with radio and prepared piano. His peers introduced him to the composers Steve Reich, Terry Riley, and Philip Glass. In this period, Basinski created his first tape music experiments, using a Sony Walkman. Reich's Music for 18 Musicians and Brian Eno's Ambient 1: Music for Airports have also been cited as influences for their use of repetition. In 1980, Basinski moved to a loft in Williamsburg, Brooklyn. Later in the decade, he recorded from found sound sources, shortwave radio, and delay systems. Around 1990, he finished renovating his loft, which was originally the third floor of the Hecla Iron Works Building, to a recording studio and concert venue, naming it Arcadia.

Years later, Basinski found magnetic tapes in a room of his loft he nicknamed the "Land that Time Forgot", where old works were stored. He was struggling from financial problems and was about to be evicted; in an interview with The Guardian, he recalled having thought: "use the time, you fucking idiot: get back in the studio and back to work". He intended to use the tapes to recreate the sounds of a Mellotron, because he could not afford one. He transferred these recordings, made in 1982 as part of a CBS Radio broadcast of Muzak music, to digital format using a Revox G36 with D batteries on top to hold the tape. Basinski found that the tape had deteriorated; as it played, the ferrite detached from the plastic backing. He allowed the loops to play for extended periods as they deteriorated further, with increasing gaps and cracks in the music. The tapes' length ranged from 6 to 15 inches, resulting in short loops. He further treated the sounds with a reverb effect from Lexicon. On "dlp 1.1" and "dlp 2.1", he added a counter-melody using the arpeggiator on a Voyetra-8 synthesizer.

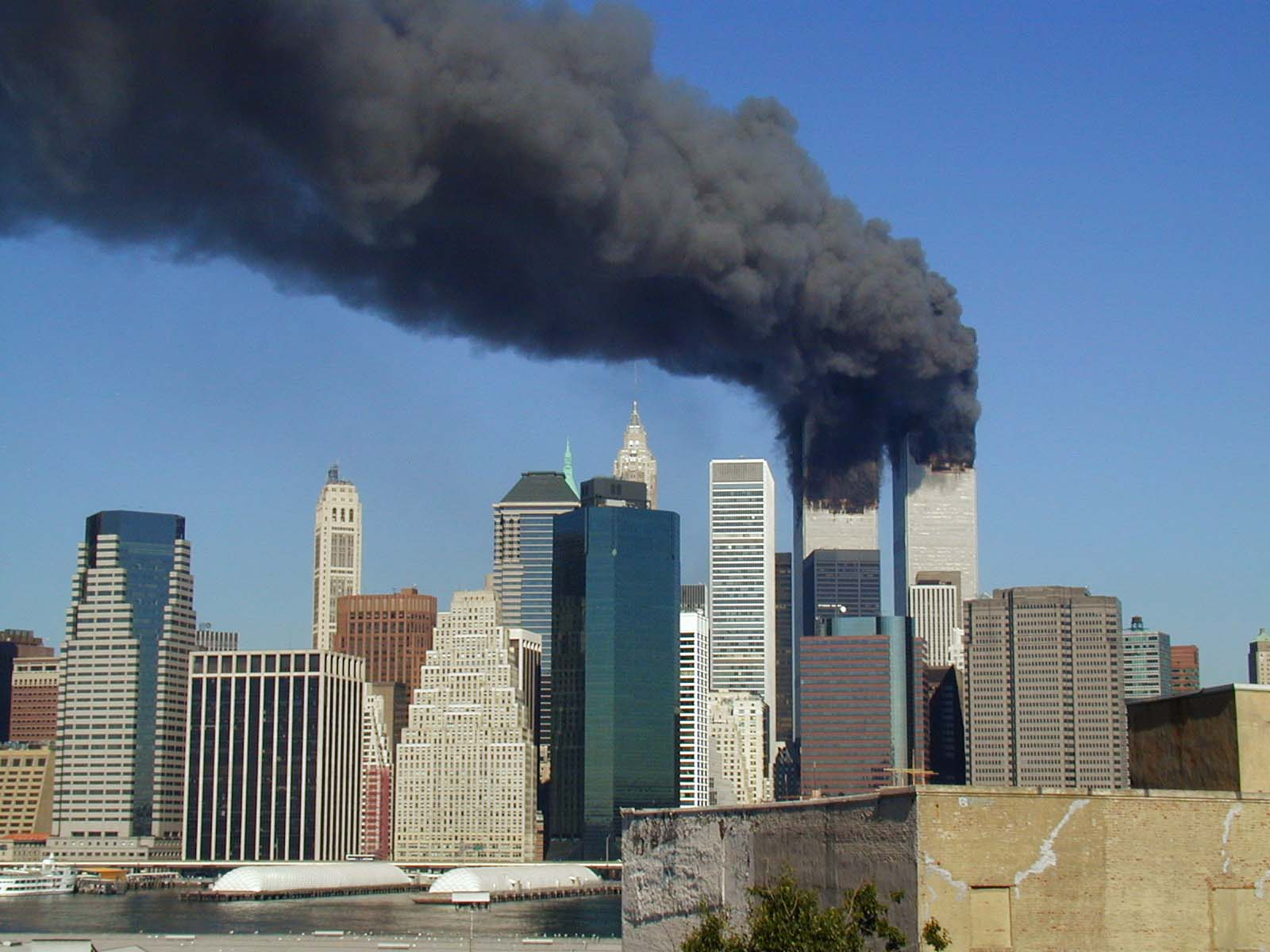
The Disintegration Loops was dedicated to the casualties of the September 11 attacks.

Basinski started the project in July 2001 and finished in late August. When it was complete, he listened to it multiple times through loudspeakers on his roof. Later in the year, he witnessed the September 11 attacks from his roof. He had an interview for the arts organization Creative Time in the buildings scheduled for that day. While the World Trade Center collapsed, he was sitting on the roof of his apartment building with friends, including the British singer Anohni. He filmed the fallout during the last hour of daylight, and the following morning he added the track "dlp 1.1" as a soundtrack to the recording. Stills from the video were used as the covers for the albums, and Basinski dedicated the work to the victims in a postscript in the liner notes. He said that the attacks recontextualized The Disintegration Loops as a work created from decay. Basinski told the Guardian he believes the conspiracy theory that the World Trade Center was destroyed in a controlled demolition.

== Music ==
Critics have categorized The Disintegration Loops as experimental, ambient, drone, and tape music with influences from process music. It consists of nine tracks, which were ordered in the sequence of when they were recorded, forming around five hours of runtime. Each track uses different loops, described by Stylus as simple and pastoral. Loops do not decay linearly; instead they start to decay after a few minutes and the process speeds up near the end. The Disintegration Loops has been likened to the works of Gas, the Caretaker's An Empty Bliss Beyond This World, Yellow Swans's Going Places, and Gavin Bryars's Jesus' Blood Never Failed Me Yet. Crack also compared the project with the composition Gymnopédies by Erik Satie, as changes in music happen in "almost imperceptible increments" until it "no longer bears the imprint of an instrument".

"dlp 1.1"
The Disintegration Loops is built on tape loops which degraded as they played. "dlp 1.1" uses a source with horns and strings.

"dlp 1.1" uses a source with horns and strings, which the critic Sasha Frere-Jones says is composed such that it suggests "neither sadness nor ecstasy but a kind of uneasy limbo". After around twenty minutes, it starts to noticeably decay, adding gaps in between loops. It is the longest track in The Disintegration Loops with a duration of about sixty minutes. "dlp 1.1" is continued on the last installment as the last tracks of the series, with "dlp 1.2" and "dlp 1.3". These use loops similar to each other, which Stylus describes as "soft, warm halos of sound". "dlp 2.1" is the shortest track with a runtime of eleven minutes and has a metallic drone, which Mark Richardson of Pitchfork found evoking anxiety and dread. "dlp 3" uses a clip similar to the works of the French composer Debussy, "stretched to infinity and then lowered into an acid bath". Richardson likened the loop for "dlp 4" to the early works of the electronic music duo Boards of Canada and most of the loop decays quickly except for a segment lasting for around two seconds. The second half of "dlp 4" is almost completely composed of cracks and noise, which some interpret as relating to despair, loneliness, or the end times.

== Release and performances ==
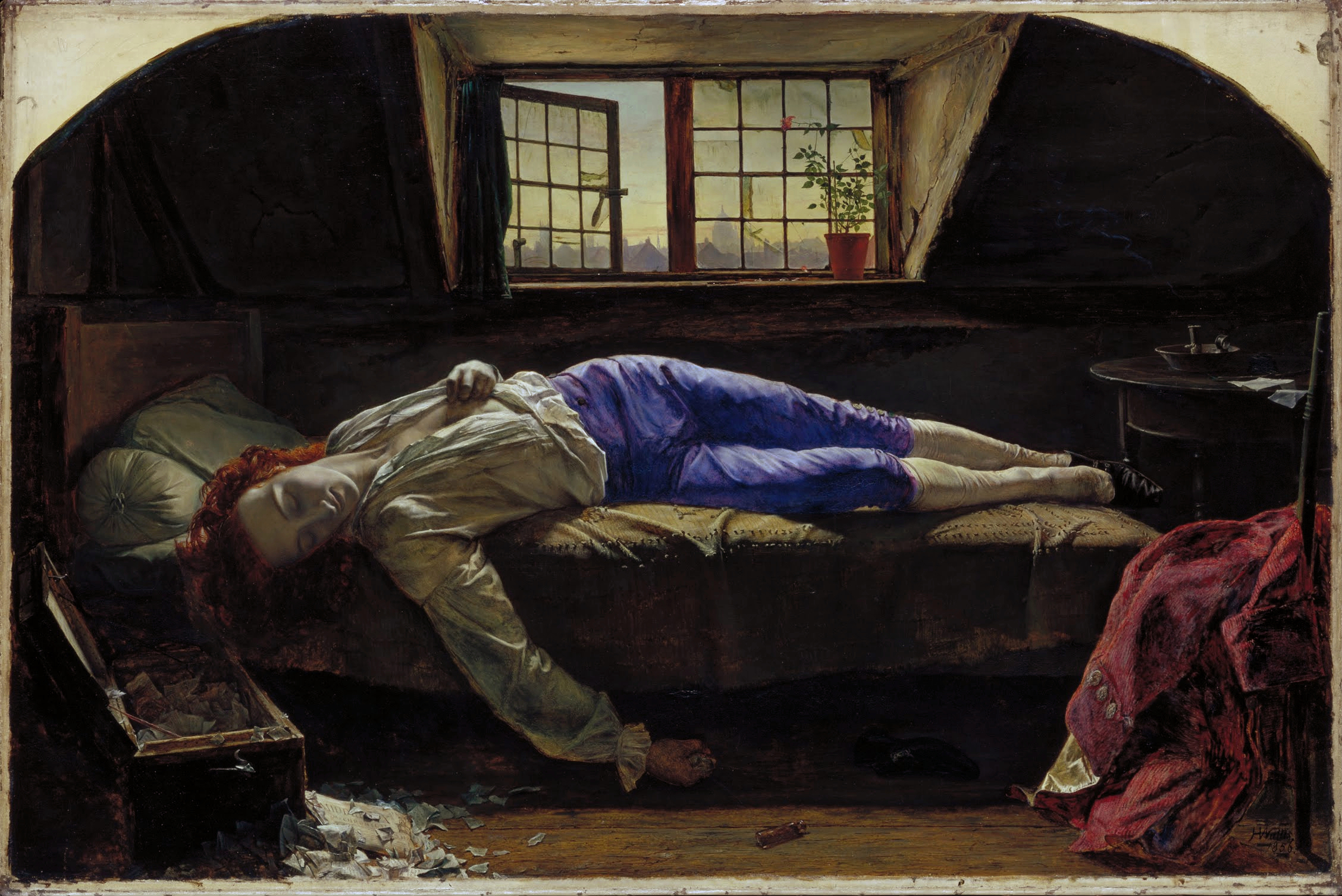
The Death of Chatterton is referenced in the back cover of the first installment.

The first installment of The Disintegration Loops was released in 2002, and three later installments were released in 2003, all on Basinski's label, 2062. These were CDs packaged in plastic sleeves. In the back cover of the first installment, Basinski can be seen with a "lost expression" and arms positioned that implied "he was descending into a void". This is a reference to the painting The Death of Chatterton by Henry Wallis, which depicts the poet Thomas Chatterton committing suicide. Basinski said: "He was a brilliant artist that killed himself before anyone discovered how brilliant he was. A fallen angel." His video of the World Trade Center collapsing was released in 2004 on DVD.

On the tenth anniversary of the attacks, the Wordless Music Orchestra performed "dlp 1.1" as part of the Remembering September 11 concert, conducted by Ryan McAdams and scored by Maxim Moston. It took place at 3:30 p.m. Eastern Daylight Time in the Temple of Dendur exhibit of the Metropolitan Museum of Art and was preceded by three string quartet pieces: Ingram Marshall's Fog Tropes II, Osvaldo Golijov's Tenebrae, and Alfred Schnittke's Collected Songs Where Every Verse Is Filled with Grief. It had around 800 attendees, with 400 others unable to enter. An essay by Basinski on making The Disintegration Loops was published along the performance. The concert was webcast and archived by the websites NPR and WQXR-FM.

On September 4, 2012, the New York record label Temporary Residence reissued the series as a box set, marking its tenth anniversary and its introduction into the National September 11 Memorial & Museum. The collection, which was remastered, was released in a limited edition of 2,000 copies, with 9×LP and 5×CD versions, the 2004 DVD, and a 144-page coffee table book with photos and notes from Basinski, Anohni, David Tibet, Ronen Givony of the Wordless Music Orchestra, and Michael Shulan, a former director for the National September 11 Memorial & Museum. It also included two orchestral renditions of "dlp 1.1": the Wordless Music Orchestra performance and one at the 54th Venice Biennale on October 18, 2008. Previous remasters had been released, though the Dusted writer Marc Medwin found these to have negligible changes, compared to this reissue, which they described as having more depth.

In 2018, the Polish National Radio Symphony Orchestra performed The Disintegration Loops, and in March 2019, the Chicago Philharmonic performed "dlp 1.1" with their conductor Emanuele Andrizzi. In March 2021, the documentary Disintegration Loops premiered at South by Southwest, starring Basinski with a duration of forty-five minutes and David Wexler as the director. A review from Exclaim! by Alex Hudson criticized it, feeling the film "doesn't do justice" to The Disintegration Loops's "once-in-a-lifetime uniqueness", stating it distracted viewers from its main topic by posing Basinski's 2020 album Lamentations to the same standard. On November 7, 2025, Temporary Residence released The Disintegration Loops (Arcadia Archive Edition), a remaster of the series done by Josh Bonati, under 8×LP and 4×CD. The reissue also included a 1,000-word foreword from the musician Laurie Anderson, where she writes on the progression of the loops.

== Reception and legacy ==
Professional ratings
Review scores
| Source | Rating |
|---|---|
| AllMusic | (I) (II) (III) |
| Mojo | 5/5 stars |
| Pitchfork | 9.4/10 (2004); 10/10 (2012) |
| Spectrum Culture | 4.5/5 stars |
| Stylus | A+ |
| Sputnikmusic | 5/5 |
| Uncut | 10/10 |

Critics have regarded The Disintegration Loops as a significant release in ambient and electronic music and as one of the most important works about the September 11 attacks. It has also been credited for popularizing Basinski's works, setting his status as an avant-garde musician. According to The New York Times, it has influenced artists including Burial, the Caretaker, and William Tyler, all of whom are associated with the hauntology movement. The Caretaker, while working on Everywhere at the End of Time (2016–2017), has said he recognizes his admiration of Basinski's works.

The nature of its background has become of note. Prompting if The Disintegration Loops would hold up without its context of the attacks, Rodger Coleman of Spectrum Culture says that it would, arguing the medium being the destruction of tapes can be viewed as about death, while Textura says the series would have not gained its prominence without it. On Sputnikmusic, the former staff member StrangerofSorts explains how it represents to a listener being the "most powerful" aspect of the project, rather than the music itself; they also note how the role of decay shows a contrast between the initial loops and the result of such decay. In a listicle from Tiny Mix Tapes, Keith Kawaii writes that its aleatoric elements "separated the artist from his art", creating a piece of "non-art" to tribute the attacks. In a review by Michael Pementel on Treblezine, he writes on loss as a subject of the series: "The Disintegration Loops aren't just a elegy for a specific tragedy, they're an elegy for time lost, a confrontation of our limited window of time here". Critics also accused Basinski as exploiting the attacks, feeling the series was creating a false connection.

Various publications have given positive reviews for the project, including some which rate it with a perfect score. Pitchfork gave it a score of 9.4 out of ten in 2004; the critic Joe Tangari described it as a "soundtrack to the horror" in context of the recording. In 2012, Pitchfork gave it a perfect score on a review from Richardson of the Temporary Residence reissue; Richardson remarks that while it follows the core idea of ambient music, there is "something uncanny" from its progression and background. Writing for Stylus, Michael Heumann calls it one of the best tributes of the attack. Heumann also categorizes it as "natural music", because it was made coincidentally and is dedicated to that nature. In AllMusic's reviews for the first and second installments, Fred Thomas writes that the music is expressive, despite being made through simple means. A review for the third installment was written by James Mason, who described it as more accessible than other parts. In a retrospective review from Uncut, which gave The Disintegration Loops a perfect score out of ten, Daniel Dylan Wray writes: "It still sounds like nothing else: haunting, celestial, overwhelmingly immersive. An arresting and singular document of music, memory, time and loss".

Pitchfork named the series the 30th-best album of 2004, the 196th-best album of the 2000s, and the third-best ambient record of all time. It was named the 86th-best album of the decade by Resident Advisor, and the tenth-best by Tiny Mix Tapes. Mojo named The Disintegration Loops the best drone album of all time. In 2025, Resident Advisor named "dlp 1.1" the 31st-best electronic track of the preceding 25 years.

== Track listing ==
The Disintegration Loops
| No. | Title | Length |
|---|---|---|
| 1. | "dlp 1.1" | 63:00 |
| 2. | "dlp 2.1" | 11:00 |
| Total length: | | 74:00 |

The Disintegration Loops II
| No. | Title | Length |
|---|---|---|
| 1. | "dlp 2.2" | 33:00 |
| 2. | "dlp 3" | 42:00 |
| Total length: | | 75:00 |

The Disintegration Loops III
| No. | Title | Length |
|---|---|---|
| 1. | "dlp 4" | 20:00 |
| 2. | "dlp 5" | 53:00 |
| Total length: | | 73:00 |

The Disintegration Loops IV
| No. | Title | Length |
|---|---|---|
| 1. | "dlp 6" | 40:36 |
| 2. | "dlp 1.2" | 21:48 |
| 3. | "dlp 1.3" | 12:00 |
| Total length: | | 74:24 |

== Charts ==
Chart performance for The Disintegration Loops
| Chart (2025) | Peak position |
|---|---|
| UK Album Downloads (Official Charts) | 83 |

Chart performance for The Disintegration Loops (Arcadia Archive Edition)
| Chart (2026) | Peak position |
|---|---|
| Scottish Albums (Official Charts) | 84 |
| UK Independent Albums (Official Charts) | 37 |
| US New Age Albums (Billboard) | 6 |

== See also ==
- On Time Out of Time, an album by William Basinski
