= Mallsoft =

Microgenre of music

- Stylistic origins: Vaporwave; muzak; ambient
- Cultural origins: Early 2010s, Internet, 4chan

Other topics
- Signalwave

Mallsoft (also known as mallwave) is a vaporwave subgenre centered around shopping malls.

== Overview ==
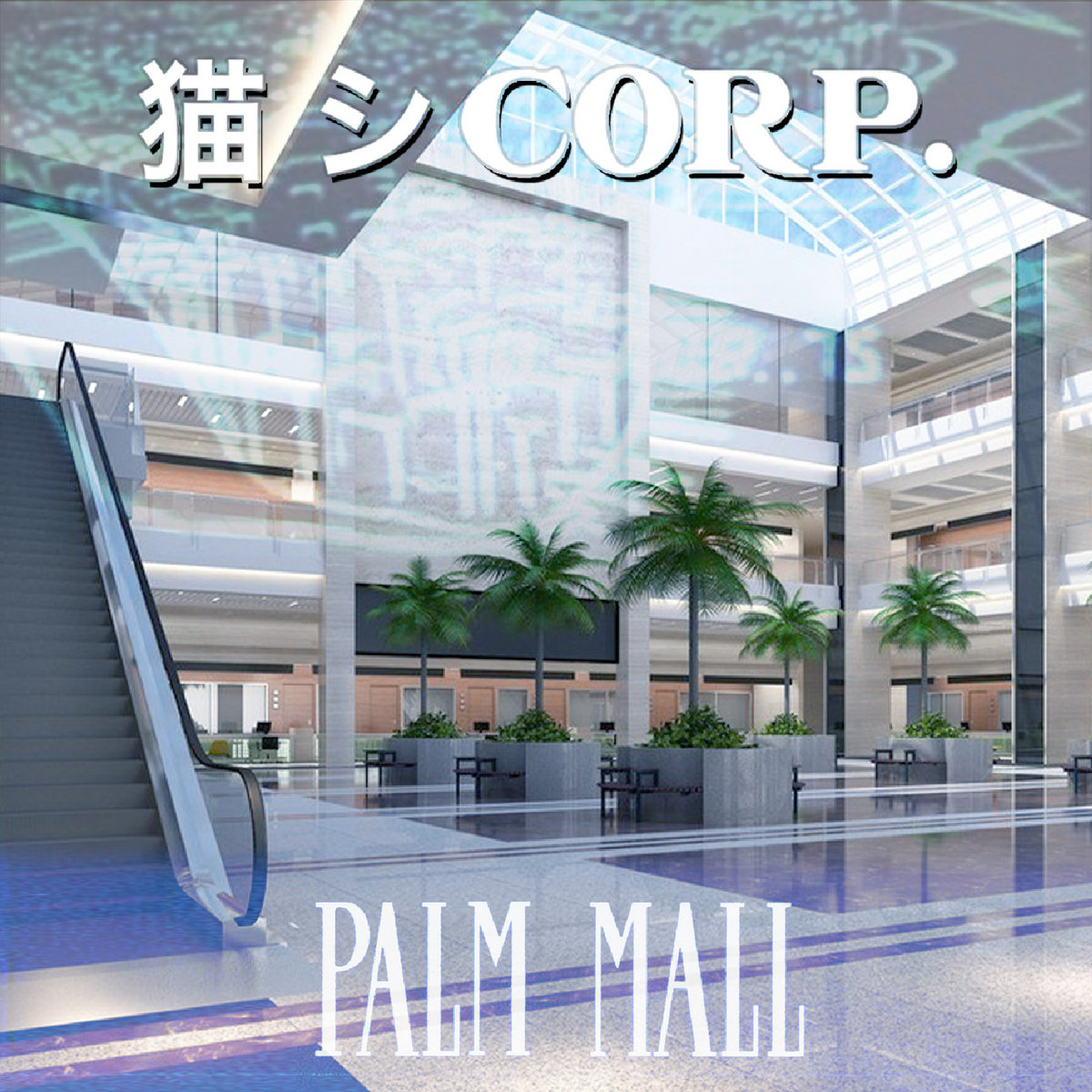
Album cover of Palm Mall by Cat System Corp. Illustrations such as these are often used as artwork for mallsoft music.

The album Palm Mall, an example of the genre

Often based on corporate lounge music, mallsoft is meant to conjure images of shopping malls, grocery stores, lobbies, and other places of public commerce. Mallsoft artists typically elicit nostalgic memories of these retail establishments, even to those who did not experience them firsthand, sampling easy listening, bossa nova, and smooth jazz music. The music can also include intermittent advertisements, as well as the sounds of footsteps, conversations, and air conditioning. Much of the listening enjoyment is derived from nostalgia and the "pleasure of remembering for the sake of the act of remembering itself".

== History ==
Mallsoft originated in the early 2010s, with the release of Vacant Places by Hantasi in 2012 via self-released limited edition CD run of 100 copies. Initially, it was not characterized as a vaporwave release, but was tagged as mallsoft later in March 2013. Other artists, such as Cat System Corp, Disconscious, and 식료품groceries, would soon follow up with their releases of the mallsoft genre.

== Characteristics ==
Some artists simply slow down and reverberate 1980s pop songs to make them sound as if emanating from the overhead speakers in an empty or abandoned mall. Reverb and distortion are often overlaid on top of tracks to give them an isolating and disorienting feeling. YouTube videos frequently pair mallsoft tracks with images of malls, with an emphasis on those that appear to have been produced in the 1980s and 1990s. The visuals intend to invoke a sense of loneliness along with the cold nature of meandering through overly corporate mercantile environments.

== Reception ==
Music journalist Simon Chandler described Dutch artist Cat System Corp.'s 2014 album Palm Mall as being "perhaps the definitive mallsoft album".

== See also ==
- Ambient music
- Postmodern architecture
- Dead mall
