= Pursuit of Loneliness =

2012 American film

- Directed by: Laurence Thrush
- Produced by: Growth Film
- Cinematography: Gary Young
- Music by: William Basinski
- Release date: January 22, 2012 (Sundance)
- Running time: 96 minutes
- Country: United States
- Language: English

Pursuit of Loneliness is a 2012 American film written and directed by Laurence Thrush. The black and white documentary-styled film is about the loneliness of old age, in which an elderly woman has died anonymously in a Los Angeles county hospital. The cast includes Joy Hille, Sandra Escalante, Sharon Munfus, Kirsi Toivanen, and Natalie Fouron.
