= Cascade (William Basinski album) =

Studio album by William Basinski
- Released: April 28, 2015
- Studios: 2062, Los Angeles, California
- Length: 40:12
- Label: 2062
- Producer: William Basinski

William Basinski chronology
Nocturnes (2013)	Cascade (2015)	The Deluge (2015)

Cascade is a studio album by William Basinski. It was released on 2062 Records on April 28, 2015. The release comes with a download code for The Deluge. It peaked at number 4 on Billboard's New Age Albums chart.

== Critical reception ==
Professional ratings
Aggregate scores
Source	Rating
Metacritic	80/100
Review scores
Source	Rating
Pitchfork	7.4/10
PopMatters	8/10 stars
Spectrum Culture	3.75/5
Tiny Mix Tapes	3.5/5 marks

At Metacritic, which assigns a weighted average score out of 100 to reviews from mainstream critics, the album received an average score of 80, based on 8 reviews, indicating "generally favorable reviews".

Ian King of PopMatters gave the album 8 out of 10 stars, saying, "The piece is so gradual that when the curtain finally does fall the phantom of that piano loop lingers in the ears for long after." Meanwhile, Brian Howe of Pitchfork gave the album a 7.4 out of 10, saying, "it has endless variation at the micro level, which creates the sense of a paradox—repetition that is impossible to grasp, slipping ceaselessly through your fingers."

Fact placed it at number 40 on the "50 Best Albums of 2015" list.

== Track listing ==
No.	Title	Length
1.	"Cascade"	40:12

== Personnel ==
Credits adapted from the liner notes.

- William Basinski – piano, tape loop
- Preston Wendel – engineering
- Denis Blackham – mastering
- James Elaine – drawings
- Richard Chartier – design

== Charts ==
Chart	Peak position
US New Age Albums (Billboard)	4
