= Selva Oscura =

Studio album by William Basinski and Lawrence English
- Released: October 12, 2018
- Recorded: 2017–2018
- Studio: 2062 (Los Angeles); Negative Space (Brisbane)
- Genre: Ambient
- Length: 38:44
- Label: Temporary Residence
- Producer: William Basinski; Lawrence English

Selva Oscura is a collaborative studio album by American musician William Basinski and Australian musician Lawrence English. It was released on October 12, 2018, through Temporary Residence Limited.

== Background ==
William Basinski is an American musician based in Los Angeles. Lawrence English is an Australian musician based in Brisbane. Selva Oscura is their debut collaborative album. It was recorded in Los Angeles and Brisbane simultaneously. It consists of two tracks: "Mono no Aware" and "Selva Oscura". The album's title is taken from Dante's Inferno. The album is dedicated to experimental filmmaker Paul Clipson, a close friend of Basinski and English, who died in February 2018. It was released on October 12, 2018, through Temporary Residence Limited.

== Critical reception ==
Professional ratings
Review scores
Source	Rating
Drowned in Sound	9/10
Pitchfork	6.0/10
Spectrum Culture	3.5/5

Brian Howe of Pitchfork stated, "The two 20-minute pieces here hew closer to English's clean, burnished style than Basinski's looser, danker one, with more smoothly layered hums than creepy decay." William Lewis of Drowned in Sound wrote, "Dense and constant yet in an eternal state of delicate movement, sounds appear and recede in almost indistinguishable patterns creating the sense of 'eternal reveal' so desired." Erik Otis of XLR8R called it "one of the defining ambient albums of 2018."

=== Accolades ===
Year-end lists for Selva Oscura
Publication	List	Rank	Ref.
XLR8R	XLR8R's Best of 2018: Releases	—	

== Track listing ==
All tracks are written by William Basinski and Lawrence English.

Selva Oscura track listing
No.	Title	Length
1.	"Mono no Aware"	18:48
2.	"Selva Oscura"	19:56
Total length:		38:44

== Personnel ==
Credits adapted from liner notes.

- William Basinski – production
- Lawrence English – production
- Richard Chartier – design
- James Elaine – original photography
