= On Time Out of Time =

Studio album by William Basinski
- Released: March 8, 2019
- Length: 49:18
- Label: Temporary Residence Limited
- Producer: William Basinski

William Basinski chronology
Selva Oscura (2018)	On Time Out of Time (2019)	Lamentations (2020)

On Time Out of Time is a studio album by William Basinski. It was released on Temporary Residence Limited on March 8, 2019. It peaked at number 2 on Billboard's New Age Albums chart.

For the album, Basinski collaborated with LIGO (Laser Interferometer Gravitational-Wave Observatory) to record the sounds of two black holes merging 1.3 billion years ago.

== Critical reception ==
Professional ratings
Aggregate scores
Source	Rating
Metacritic	81/100
Review scores
Source	Rating
Exclaim!	7/10
The Line of Best Fit	8/10
Pitchfork	8.0/10
PopMatters	8/10 stars
Resident Advisor	3.8/5

At Metacritic, which assigns a weighted average score out of 100 to reviews from mainstream critics, the album received an average score of 81, based on 8 reviews, indicating "universal acclaim".

Jack Bray of The Line of Best Fit gave the album an 8 out of 10, writing, "Whether it is the temporary respite from a challenging sonic environment or the steady progression towards splendour, On Time Out of Time is a rewarding experience for those willing to tolerate challenging moments in a celestial sea of sound." Oliver Thompson of Exclaim! gave the album a 7 out of 10, commenting that "Basinski's latest effort is ambitious yet remains rooted in what he does best: instilling a multitude of visceral, yet ambiguous, feelings within his listener."

== Track listing ==
No.	Title	Length
1.	"On Time Out of Time"	39:33
2.	"4(E+D)4(ER=EPR)"	9:43

== Personnel ==
Credits adapted from the liner notes.

- William Basinski – music
- Preston Wendel – additional synthesizer, engineering
- Lawrence English – mastering
- Dmitry Gelfand – photography
- Evelina Domnitch – photography
- Richard Chartier – design

== Charts ==
Chart	Peak position
US New Age Albums (Billboard)	2
