= Expressway Yo-Yo Dieting =

Musical project by Pat Maher

Expressway Yo-Yo Dieting (sometimes alternatively presented as DJ Yo-Yo Dieting) is a musical project by Pat Maherr, also known as Indignant Senility.

Expressway Yo-Yo Dieting presents psychedelic slowed-down music heavily influenced by the genre of slowed hip hop music called Chopped and Screwed. The project's musical style is noted for its genre-defying propensity, especially for its mashing together of ambient, noise and hip hop. The pieces are born from remixing rap and other songs, but with such extreme tempo shifts that "[all] that is left is a glacial beat being buffeted by impossibly slow, deep, and incomprehensible vocals that bubble, shudder, stretch, crackle, and quaver nightmarishly.". The music has been described as going beyond the remix to becoming deconstructions of music. Maher said that most of his source material was 90s rap tapes.
