= Going Places (Yellow Swans album) =

Studio album by Yellow Swans
- Released: March 2, 2010
- Recorded: 2007–2008
- Studios: Below Rotture, Portland, Oregon
- Genres: Noise; experimental; drone; ambient; post-rock
- Length: 44:34
- Label: Type Records

Yellow Swans chronology
At All Ends (2007)	Going Places (2010)

Going Places is an album by the American experimental music band Yellow Swans, released on March 2, 2010, by Type Records. It is the final album by the band, released after the band's 2008 breakup. Following the decision to disband in late 2007, the duo decided that making the final album was a priority. Yellow Swans spent a total of 18 months working on the album, first recording 80–100 hours of material during the rehearsals for their final shows, and then progressively editing the recordings down to the album's final runtime.

Going Places is a noise music album with elements of drone, ambient music, and post-rock. To achieve its harsh sound, the duo performed on electric guitars and processed them through both amplifiers and a reel-to-reel tape recorder, applying various effects in stages, especially delay, in the process. Going Places marked a stylistic progression in Yellow Swans' discography, with a more gentle and melodic sound than the band's previous works.

The album received critical acclaim. Most reviewers praised Yellow Swans for their experimentation and creativity, with some critics naming Going Places the band's best album. Several publications, including The Village Voice in their Pazz & Jop music critics poll, named Going Places one of the best albums of the year.

== Background ==
Gabriel Mindel Saloman and Pete Swanson met in 1999. In 2001, after Saloman moved to Portland, Oregon, they formed the duo Yellow Swans and started performing together. By the end of the 2000s, they released nearly 100 projects, with the majority being obscure releases distributed on CD-Rs, along with a few full-length albums released through record labels. Yellow Swans had achieved critical success; that did not result in financial success, but allowed the duo to tour continuously. They dedicated the majority of each year to touring.

According to Saloman, they felt exhausted due to the constant cycle of touring and recording. To avoid conflicts and preserve their friendship, in 2008 Yellow Swans made the decision to disband. In a 2012 interview, Swanson emphasized that they broke up on good terms. He added that by 2007 Yellow Swans "had hit a wall" after years of touring without achieving financial stability. The decision to disband was also influenced by Saloman's marriage and subsequent relocation to Canada, which would have made in-person collaboration impossible. These challenges, along with uncertainty regarding their artistic path moving forward, ultimately led to their disbandment.

== Recording ==
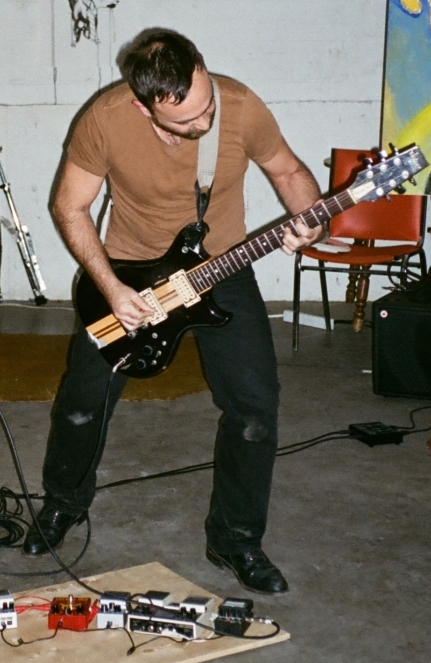
Gabriel Saloman (pictured in 2014) played electric guitar on Going Places.

Yellow Swans started working on Going Places after they decided to breakup in late 2007. The duo made a list of tasks they needed to complete before parting ways; making the final album ended up being a top priority. Yellow Swans already had several shows planned for 2008. Recorded rehearsals for these shows were used as the source material for several albums, including Going Places. The sessions took place in the basement of their friends' Rotture club in Portland, which the duo used for rehearsals. Gabriel Saloman played electric guitar, while Pete Swanson processed it through a reel-to-reel tape recorder. During the recording, he applied various hardware filters and effects, such as delay and distortion, mixed with feedback. For each track, they set up what Swanson described as a "sound vocabulary", a set of individual sounds associated with the track, which they subsequently used for improvisation. Until their final show in June 2008, the band recorded 80–100 hours of material. "We were more in the zone during these sessions than we'd ever been", said Saloman.

After Yellow Swans finished recording the album, they started editing it by removing bigger, non-essential portions, reducing the album's length to 60–90 minutes, and then fine-tuning the result until they were satisfied with the album's flow and narrative. The duo spent 18 months working on Going Places. Swanson originally planned to include vocals, but by the time they finished the album, he was already busy with university and thought the instrumental version was complex enough.

Pete Swanson chose the title of the album; he named it after one of his favorite stories by Leonard Michaels. According to the band's members, the title is meant to be taken literally, as it's a reflection of their post-breakup experiences: after years of neglecting formal education and careers, they were now relocating to new places—Gabriel Saloman moved to Canada and Pete Swanson moved to New York City—to change that, while their personal lives were undergoing significant changes.

After completing the album, Yellow Swans faced difficulties in finding suitable cover art. After two unsuccessful attempts with different artists, the band selected the cover art created by the artist Jefre Cantu-Ledesma. Discussing the album in 2020, Saloman said that he still considers its cover a "haunting picture". He added, "It actually captures the view from wherever it is we went when we played that music".

== Composition ==
=== Style ===
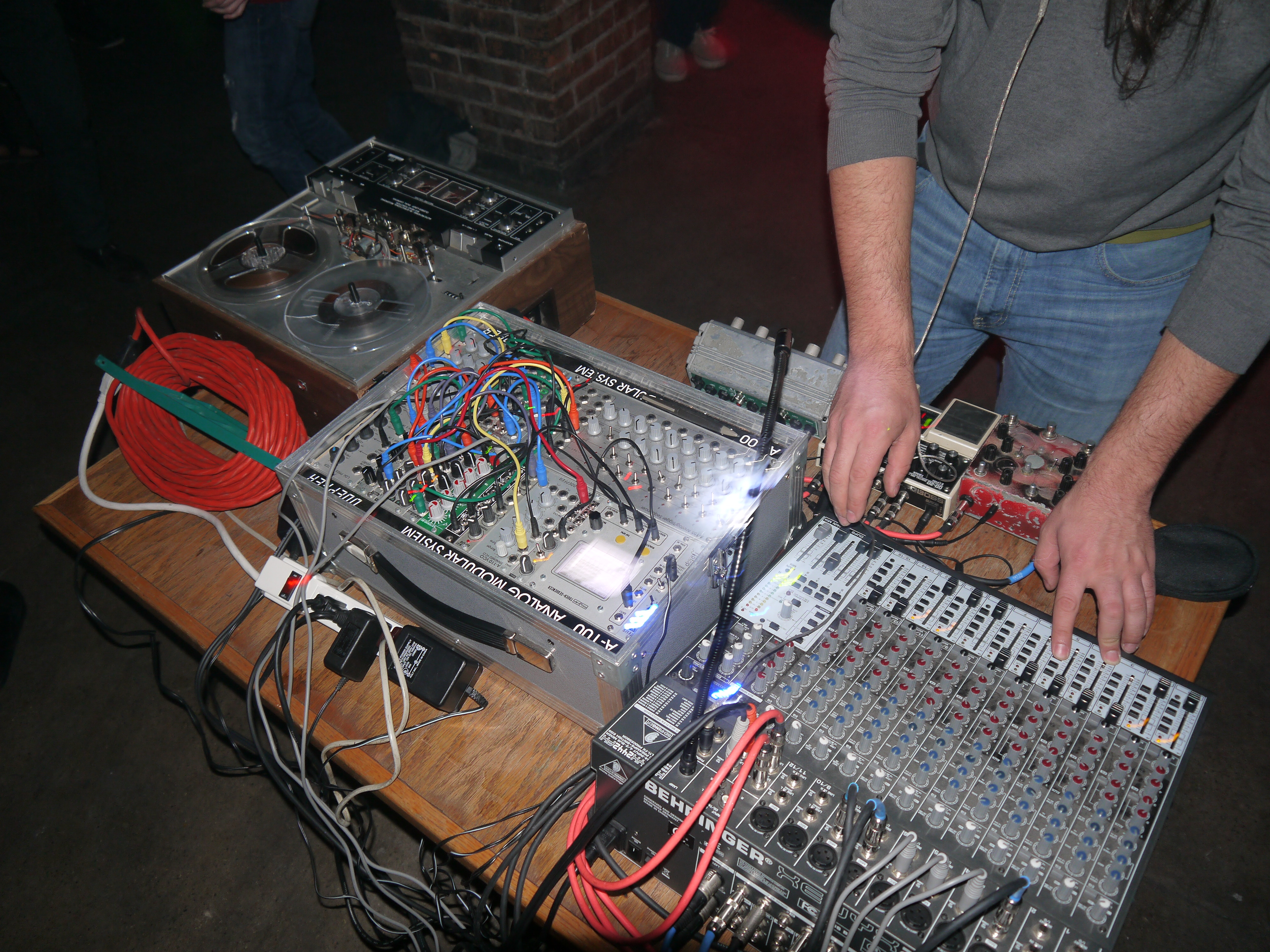
Pete Swanson (pictured in 2013) performing live with some of the equipment used in the production of Going Places.

Going Places is a noise album, composed from heavily processed guitar phrases, utilizing post-rock techniques. Pete Swanson said that utilizing deteriorated tapes, along with various filters and effects during the recording allowed the band to achieve a "dense and gauzy sound". Sasha Frere-Jones of The New Yorker wrote that its tracks "have titles but certainly don't resemble songs", comparing the album's sound to the noises produced by hard drives and a distorted transmission through damaged wires and muffled phones. Pitchfork's Marc Masters called it "noise in IMAX". Eric Dawson of Tiny Mix Tapes thought Yellow Swans were "exploring textures and tones, [...] weaving sounds in and around each other". The Wire's writer Nick Cain noted that unlike the band's previous records, on Going Places the abrasive textures and high-pitched sounds are "blurred and softened into a melodic mid-range", making it sound closer to psychedelia. The album also features elements of drone music, characterized by the use of short, repeated sounds, and ambient music.

=== Tracks ===
Going Places consists of six tracks, varying in length. Most of them gradually build up, without reaching a peak. The tracks are multi-layered, filled with distorted loops and fuzzy guitar riffs, with occasional subtle melodies in the background. The album starts with its shortest track, titled "Foiled". The track is built upon a contrast between a soft melody, resembling a mantra, and what AllMusic's Ned Raggett described as "cascades of feedback and rhythmic, quick-paced sonics", accentuated by percussion. The surrounding static, which Dave Heaton of PopMatters compared to the relentless power of machinery, clears out towards the end of the track. Immediately following it is "Opt Out", the album's longest track. The track starts quietly but grows more intense and aggressive as it progresses, due to the heavy use of static noise. Heaton thought the song's progression was similar to a film score, making the song "cathartic in more ways than one". In contrast, the next track, "Sovereign", is less intense. According to Patrick Masterson of Dusted magazine, this allows it to sustain the climax of "Opt Out", and shows the careful consideration Yellow Swans put into the pacing of Going Places. Marc Masters believed the prolonged notes of "Sovereign" evoke a feeling of melancholic longing, while Joel Elliott of Cokemachineglow called it "the best approximation of the stillness and melancholy of ruins".

"Limited Space"
The second half of "Limited Space" features a roaring static effect described by the music critic Joel Elliott as resembling Colosseum crowds.

The fourth track of the album, "Limited Space", is one of the more complex tracks on Going Places, featuring a rich sonic palette. Heaton viewed the track as "quite majestic", with a "heavy sense of distilled foreboding". He wrote that the guitar sounds evoke the imagery of vast desert landscapes, while the chime-like sounds reminded him of a railroad and a sense of journey associated with it, suggested by the album's title. Elliott also noted the chime sound and how, alongside a bass pulse, throughout the track it alternates between left and right stereo channels, resembling a tribute to the project Gas of the German musician Wolfgang Voigt. The track appears to subverts the aesthetic of the genre of the project by evoking confinement as opposed to the open and spacious atmosphere of Voigt's music. The track is followed by "New Life", which Elliott compared to an unoccupied land lot, devoid of buildings. Marc Masters noted the track's sense of joy, achieved through the use of sounds which "convey the optimism of rebirth". "Going Places" is the final track of the album. It features complex distorted textures and continuous droning sounds. The elements of the track get layered on top of each other as the track progresses, culminating in a high-pitched climax, which then gradually fades away into an echo. Dawson characterized "Going Places" as an "amazing mini-epic", consisting of "cacophony". Cain named it the harshest track on the album, adding that it "levels out in a blast of delicately modulated feedback, eloquently articulating a muted yet elegiac farewell". Raggett also viewed it as a "fitting conclusion", that "[concludes] on one last guitar part screaming away into the heavens".

== Release ==
Originally planned for a 2009 release, Going Places was released on March 2, 2010, by Type Records. The album was accompanied by a bonus disc Being There: an hour-long album, split into four tracks, two of which were extended, less edited versions of tracks from Going Places. Music critic Brad Cohan classified Being There as free improvisation, drone, and psychedelia. In 2020, Yellow Swans collaborated with record label and retailer Boomkat to celebrate the album's ten-year anniversary with a vinyl re-release. Going Places was reissued as a vinyl LP, while Being There was released on double vinyl, with both releases limited to 500 copies. The duo also made both albums available on Bandcamp through digital downloads.

== Critical reception ==
Professional ratings
Aggregate scores
Source	Rating
Metacritic	81/100
Review scores
Source	Rating
AllMusic	4/5 stars
Pitchfork	8.3/10
PopMatters	7/10
Tiny Mix Tapes	4/5 marks
Tom Hull	B+

Going Places received positive reviews from music critics. At Metacritic, which assigns a normalized rating out of 100 to reviews from mainstream publications, the album received an average score of 81, based on 7 reviews. Some reviewers compared the album to the band's previous work. Nick Cain of The Wire magazine noted the similarity between the sound on Going Places and the band's previous projects: he felt that Going Places resembles them in its use of the sonic elements, "layered into cavernously thick sound masses, which hang ominously in mid-air, or are slowly expanded into cacophonous crescendos", but differs in its blurring and softening of the harsh noise textures that adds "depth of sonic impact" to the album. Eric Dawson of Tiny Mix Tapes named Going Places as one of the band's best albums, noting that the duo "offers an exemplar of themselves and noise, at their ecstatic heights". Bryan Walker, in his review for Exclaim!, called the album a "powerful final sonic testament". XLR8R's reviewer Brandon Bussolini thought Going Places encapsulates the duo's creative tension, which, he believed, contributed to Yellow Swans' "sporadic genius" and ultimately led to their dissolution. He described the album as having a haunting presence, while also conveying a sense of comfort by capturing the essence of the present moment and life itself. Dusted magazine's Patrick Masterson commended the album's cohesiveness, noting that Going Places is the duo's loudest album.

Other critics lauded the creative and experimental approach of Yellow Swans. Ned Raggett of AllMusic called Going Places the band's "literal swan song", commending them for blending "uncontrolled experimentation" with "serene contemplation". He highlighted the track "Foiled" as "the contrast [...] of scraggly aural squalor and a looming sense of near-romantic melancholy". Pitchfork contributor Marc Masters thought the album "transforms a sense of finality and reflection into often incredible instrumental passages" and that it "gives you space to discover tons of themes and ideas without limiting you to specific ones". His colleague Grayson Currin published an opinion piece in Pitchfork, in which he critiqued several other music reviewers for comparing the album to the work of Tim Hecker. He argued that Yellow Swans' music is more complex and offers more depth. Using "Opt Out" from Going Places as an example, he called it a "brilliant 13-minute centerpiece" that transforms a "pretty, damaged drone" into a "sonic, seismic war". Dave Heaton of PopMatters praised the band's creativity, saying that the band did "an especially good job here of making pretty and even tuneful songs that still have that tear-your-face-off quality". Tom Hull was more critical of the album. He characterized it as "electro-noise" that lacks complexity and doesn't follow conventional melodic patterns, but also noted that the band offers enough diversity in its sonic elements to "elicit some interest".

=== Accolades ===
Several publications placed Going Places on their lists of the best albums of 2010. In The Village Voice's 2010 Pazz & Jop nationwide poll of 712 popular music critics, Going Places was ranked at number 81, with 15 critics placing it on their lists of top 10 albums of the year. PopMatters named Going Places the best experimental album of 2010, describing it as an "uncompromising glimpse into an abyss". Tiny Mix Tapes put Going Places at number 21 on their list of 50 best albums of the year, with the critic Joe Davenport calling it "powerful" and "flawless". Cokemachineglow named it 16th best album of the year, with the author Conrad Amenta praising the album as an "ambient noise masterpiece" and saying that the band "leapt, startlingly, out from the fringes of experimental noise and into the modern cultural atmosphere". Italian online magazine Ondarock placed it at number 24 on their list of the top 50 albums of 2010.

== Track listing ==
No.	Title	Length
1.	"Foiled"	4:22
2.	"Opt Out"	13:09
3.	"Sovereign"	5:44
4.	"Limited Space"	6:53
5.	"New Life"	5:17
6.	"Going Places"	9:09
Total length:		44:34

Being There bonus disc

No.	Title	Length
1.	"Foil"	18:13
2.	"Comedy Hypnosis"	16:28
3.	"Public Space"	17:46
4.	"Inhabitants"	15:57
Total length:		68:24

== Personnel ==
Credits are adapted from the album's liner notes.

- Gabriel Mindel Saloman – guitar, tapes, electronics
- Pete Swanson – electronics, tapes, vocals
- Timothy Stollenwerk – mastering
- Jefre Cantu-Ledesma – artwork
