= William Basinski =

American composer (born 1958)

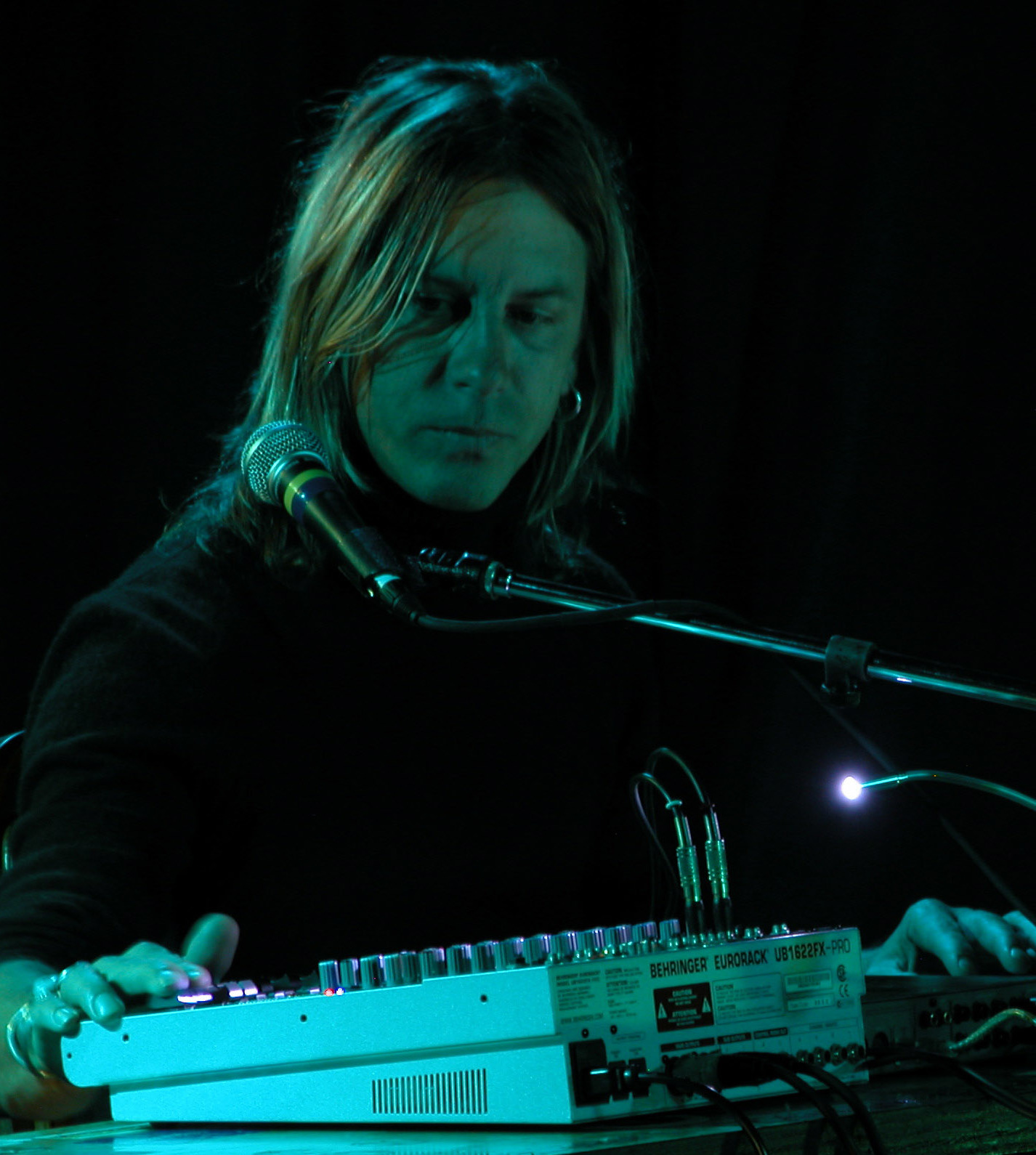
- Basinski performing live at the Empty Bottle in 2005

Background information
- Born: June 25, 1958 (age 68); Houston, Texas, U.S.
- Genres: Experimental; ambient; drone music; minimal music; tape music; process music
- Occupations: Composer; musician
- Years active: 1978–present
- Labels: Raster-Noton; 2062; Temporary Residence Limited; Spekk; Durtro; Die Stadt; Line
- Member of: Sparkle Division
- Website: mmlxii.com

William James Basinski (born June 25, 1958) is an American avant-garde composer based in Los Angeles, California. He is also a clarinetist, saxophonist, sound artist, and video artist.

Basinski is best known for his four-volume album The Disintegration Loops (2002–2003), constructed from gradually decaying twenty-year-old tapes of his earlier music.

== Biography ==
=== Early life ===
William James Basinski was born in 1958 in Houston, Texas. He was raised in a Catholic family, and states that he had his first "really mystical, wonderful, magical" musical experiences as an infant at Houston's St. Anne Church. His father was a scientist contracted to NASA, which caused the family to move often. Basinski says he knew that he was gay from an early age.

A classically trained clarinetist, Basinski studied jazz saxophone and composition at the University of North Texas in the late 1970s. In 1978 inspired by minimalists such as Steve Reich and Brian Eno, he began developing his own vocabulary using tape loops and old reel-to-reel tape decks. He developed his meditative, melancholy style experimenting with short looped melodies played against themselves creating feedback loops.

=== Career ===
His first release was Shortwavemusic. Although created in 1983, it was first released on vinyl in a small edition in 1998 by Carsten Nicolai's Raster-Noton sub-label. This was followed by Watermusic, self-released in 2000 on Basinski's 2062 Records. Another 2-disc work was Variations: A Movement in Chrome Primitive, 1980: it was finally released in 2004 by David Tibet on the Durtro/Die Stadt label. At the time this work was created, Basinski was experimenting with compositions for piano and tape loops.

Throughout the 1980s, Basinski created a vast archive of experimental works using tape loop and delay systems, found sounds, and shortwave radio static. He was a member of many bands including Gretchen Langheld Ensemble and House Afire. In 1989 he opened his own performance space, "Arcadia" at 118 N. 11th Street. On one occasion, he opened for David Bowie, playing saxophone with rockabilly band The Rockats. Basinski would later dedicate "For David Robert Jones", a track from A Shadow in Time (2017), to Bowie.

In August and September 2001 he set to work on what would become his most recognizable piece, the four-volume album The Disintegration Loops. The recordings were based on old tape loops which had degraded in quality. While attempting to salvage the recordings in a digital format, the tapes slowly crumbled and left a timestamp history of their demise. The project was completed on the same morning the September 11 attacks took place, and within view of Basinski's apartment.

== Discography ==
=== Studio albums ===
- Shortwavemusic (Raster-Noton, recorded in 1982, released in 1998)
- Watermusic (2062 Records, 2001)
- The Disintegration Loops (2062 Records, 2002)
- The River (Raster-Noton, recorded in 1983, released in 2002)
- The Disintegration Loops II (2062 Records, 2003)
- The Disintegration Loops III (2062 Records, 2003)
- The Disintegration Loops IV (2062 Records, 2003)
- Watermusic II (2062 Records, 2003)
- Melancholia (2062 Records, 2003)
- A Red Score in Tile (Three Poplars, created in 1979, released in 2003)
- Variations: A Movement in Chrome Primitive (Durtro/Die Stadt, created in 1981, released in 2004)
- Silent Night (2062 Records, 2004)
- The Garden of Brokenness (2062 Records, 2006)
- Variations for Piano and Tape (2062 Records, 2006)
- El Camino Real (2062 Records, 2007)
- 92982 (2062 Records, 2009)
- Vivian & Ondine (2062 Records, 2009)
- Nocturnes (2062 Records, 2013)
- Cascade (2062 Records, 2015)
- The Deluge (2062 Records, 2015)
- A Shadow in Time (2062 Records, 2017)
- On Time Out of Time (Temporary Residence Limited, 2019)
- Hymns of Oblivion (self-released, 2020)
- Lamentations (Temporary Residence Limited, 2020)
- The Clocktower at the Beach (1979) (Line, 2023)
- September 23rd (Temporary Residence Limited, 2024)
- Passing the Cup of Sorrows (Temporary Residence Limited, 2026)

=== Collaborations ===
- Untitled (with Richard Chartier; Spekk, 2004)
- Aurora Liminalis (with Richard Chartier; Line, 2013)
- Divertissement (with Richard Chartier; Important Records, 2015)
- Selva Oscura (with Lawrence English; Temporary Residence Limited, 2018)
- " . . . on reflection " (with Janek Schaefer; Temporary Residence Limited, 2022)
- Aurora Terminalis (with Richard Chartier; Line, 2025)

=== Compilation albums ===
- The Disintegration Loops (Temporary Residence Limited, 2012)
- The Disintegration Loops: Arcadia Archive Edition (Temporary Residence Limited, 2025)

== Film scores ==
- Pursuit of Loneliness (2012)

== See also ==
- List of ambient music artists
