= Yellow Swans =

American experimental music group

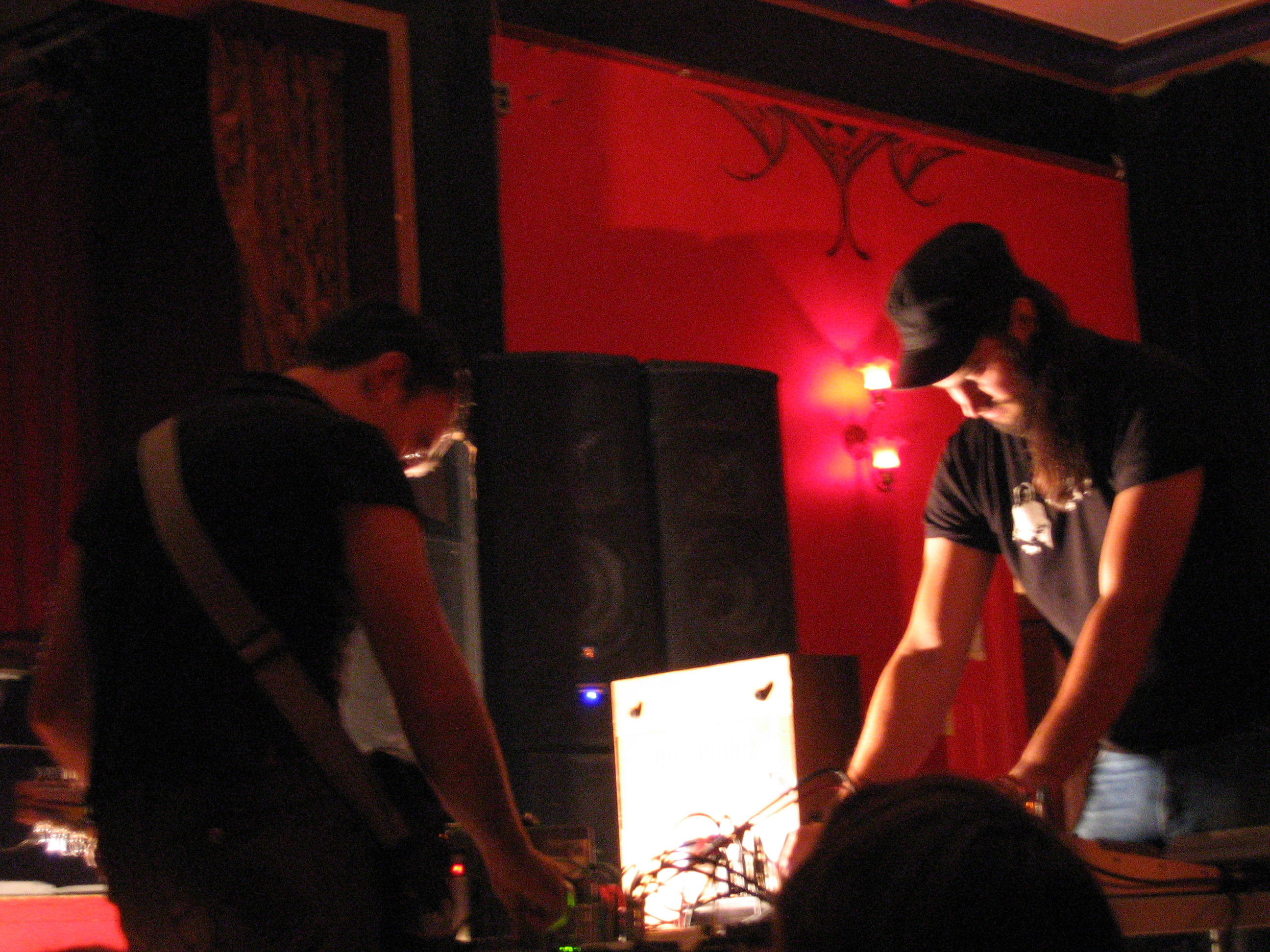
- Yellow Swans performing in Montreal, 2005; Gabriel Mindel Saloman (left) and Pete Swanson (right)

Background information
- Origin: Portland, Oregon, United States
- Genres: Noise; experimental; electronic; psychedelia
- Years active: 2001–2008, 2023–present
- Labels: JYRK, LOAD
- Members: Pete Swanson; Gabriel Mindel Saloman
- Website: jyrk.com/yellowswans

Yellow Swans are an American experimental music band from Portland, Oregon. The duo were renowned for their improvisational approach to noise music, creating a unique experience for each live performance. They described their music as "a constantly evolving mass of psychedelic noise that is both physically arresting and psychically liberating". The band consisted of Pete Swanson (vocals, drum machine, electronics) and Gabriel Mindel Saloman (guitar, feedback, electronics). The band announced their split in April 2008. A live show by Yellow Swans at the festival Oblivion Access was announced in 2023.

== Career ==
The duo formed in Portland, Oregon in 2001. From here they established their own collective art label, JYRK where the band self-released several CD-Rs and cassettes of their music. The JYRK collective also included E*Rock and sometimes Pat Maherr (Sisprum Vish, Indignant Senility, DJ Yo-Yo Dieting). With frequent touring and shows with artists including Tussle, Xiu Xiu and Japanther, the duo moved to Oakland, California for two years. In 2003, they recorded their debut album, Bring The Neon War Home, and continued to tour across the USA.

Their debut album garnered much recognition and soon the band were invited to perform shows across Europe, Australia and New Zealand. In October 2005, Numerical Thief, a Melbourne-based label, debuted the release of the band's second studio album, Psychic Secession. It was later re-mastered and released on LOAD Records the same year, and then released on 12" vinyl by Weird Forest in 2006.

Throughout their existence, the duo used the moniker of D Yellow Swans, where the "D" can be substituted for any word beginning with the letter. This began as a joke when the band formed, and became "a fun take on anti-branding...[it's] not really meant to be elitist though". They used several different names over the past six years, as can be seen in their discography, but are most commonly referred to as simply Yellow Swans.

In April 2008, Pete Swanson announced the band's break up. In an email to Pitchfork, Swanson stated "There are no specific reasons why we've come to this point, but both Gabriel [Mindel Saloman] and I have decided that it's in our best interest to move on from the project. Neither of us have any intention to stop playing music anytime soon, but we will not be playing or performing with each other again." The group played their last US show in the city of Chicago.

After over a decade of inactivity, the band began an archival project in 2020, reissuing out of print records and uploading old content to their Bandcamp page. This was eventually followed by the February 2023 announcement of their first live performance in 15 years at the Austin-based Oblivion Access Festival in June 2023. A new recording, Out Of Practice, was announced in June 2024, consisting of live recordings from 2023.

On Sunday September 6, 2026, the band performed as part of the Sound & Gravity festival in Chicago.
