= Elevator music =

Background music played in waiting areas

Local Forecast - Elevator
Lo-fi instrumental by Kevin MacLeod, with a deliberate high-pass filter to imitate the quality of elevator speakers

Elevator music (also known as Muzak, piped music, or lift music [in British English]) is a type of background music played in elevators, in rooms where many people come together for reasons other than listening to music, and during telephone calls when placed on hold. Before the emergence of the Internet, such music was often "piped" to businesses and homes through telephone lines, private networks or targeted radio broadcasting (as in the BBC's Music While You Work, where powerful speakers were set up in factories to make the broadcast audible).

There is no specific sound associated with elevator music, but it usually involves simple instrumental themes from "soft" popular music, or "light" classical music being performed by slow strings. This type of music was produced, for instance, by the Mantovani Orchestra, and conductors such as Franck Pourcel and James Last, peaking in popularity around the 1970s.

== Other uses ==
The term can also be used for kinds of easy listening, lounge, piano solo, jazz, bossa nova or middle of the road music, or what are known as "beautiful music" radio stations.

This style of music is sometimes used to comedic effect in mass media such as film, where intense or dramatic scenes may be interrupted or interspersed with such anodyne music while characters use an elevator. Some video games have used music similarly: Metal Gear Solid 4 where a few elevator music-themed tracks are accessible on the in-game iPod, as well as System Shock, Rise of the Triad: Dark War, GoldenEye 007, Mass Effect, and Earthworm Jim.
