= MGMT discography =

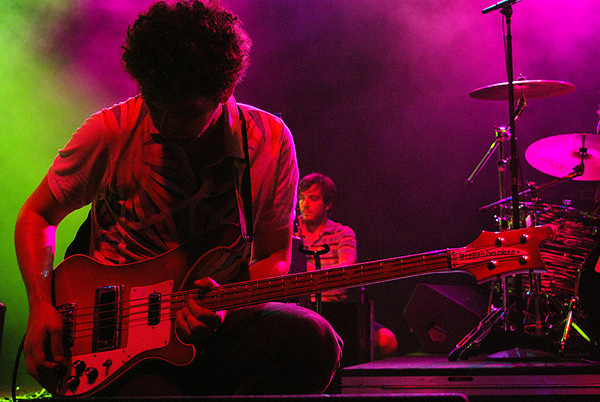
- MGMT performing at the 2008 Bonnaroo Music Festival in Manchester, Tennessee
- Studio albums: 5
- Extended plays: 4
- Live albums: 1
- Compilation albums: 1
- Singles: 17
- Music videos: 14

The discography of indie rock band MGMT consists of five studio albums, one compilation album, one demo album, four extended plays, eleven singles (including one as a featured artist) and fourteen music videos. Originally known under the name The Management, the group was founded in 2002 by Andrew VanWyngarden and Ben Goldwasser during their freshman year as art students at Wesleyan University in Middletown, Connecticut. After graduating and changing the band's name to MGMT, they released an EP titled Time to Pretend in 2005 through the independent record label Cantora Records; music videos were recorded for two of the EP's songs, "Boogie Down" and "Destrokk". The critical success of the EP and extensive touring brought the group to the attention of Columbia Records, which signed them in 2006.

MGMT worked extensively with producer Dave Fridmann in recording their debut studio album, Oracular Spectacular, which was released to digital retailers in 2007, with a physical release following in early 2008. The album reached number 38 on the US Billboard 200 and the top ten of the Irish and United Kingdom album charts – it was certified gold by the Recording Industry Association of America (RIAA), double platinum by the Irish Recorded Music Association (IRMA) and platinum by the British Phonographic Industry (BPI). Three singles, "Time to Pretend", "Electric Feel" and "Kids", were released from the album: "Kids" was the only one to appear on the US Billboard Hot 100, peaking at number 91, later receiving a platinum certification from the RIAA.

In early 2010, MGMT collaborated with rapper Kid Cudi and electronic rock duo Ratatat on the single "Pursuit of Happiness", which reached number 59 on the Billboard Hot 100 and was certified platinum by the RIAA: two different music videos were recorded for the song. "Pursuit of Happiness" also achieved chart success in European territories, peaking at number two in France and number three in the Wallonia region of Belgium. The band released their second studio album, Congratulations, in April 2010, with producer Sonic Boom contributing heavily during the recording process. The album peaked at number two in the Billboard 200 and reached the top ten of several other national album charts, including in Australia, Canada, Switzerland and the United Kingdom. Four singles were released from the album: "Flash Delirium", "Siberian Breaks", "It's Working" and "Congratulations", with "Flash Delirium" charting in Belgium, Canada and the United Kingdom. Their self-titled third studio album was released on September 17, 2013.

== Albums ==
=== Studio albums ===
List of studio albums, with selected chart positions and certifications
Title	Album details	Peak chart positions										Certifications
Title	Album details	US	AUS	AUT	BEL	CAN	FRA	GER	IRL	SWI	UK	Certifications
Oracular Spectacular	Released: October 2, 2007 (US); Label: Columbia; Formats: CD, LP, digital download	38	6	72	10	24	22	65	5	68	8	RIAA: 2× Platinum; ARIA: Platinum; BPI: 2× Platinum; BRMA: Gold; BVMI: Gold; IRMA: 2× Platinum; MC: Platinum; SNEP: Gold
Congratulations	Released: April 13, 2010 (US); Label: Columbia; Formats: CD, LP, digital download	2	9	5	6	4	7	15	5	5	4	BPI: Silver
MGMT	Released: September 13, 2013 (US); Label: Columbia; Formats: CD, LP, digital download	14	31	29	28	19	26	44	29	15	45	
Little Dark Age	Released: February 9, 2018; Label: Columbia; Formats: CD, LP, digital download	35	31	23	16	29	45	22	36	12	27	
Loss of Life	Released: February 23, 2024; Label: MGMT Records; Mom + Pop; BMG; Formats: CD, LP, digital download	— (Note: Loss of Life did not enter the US Billboard 200, but peaked at number 22 on the Album Sales Chart.)	— (Note: Loss of Life did not enter the Australian Albums Chart but peaked at number 21 on the Australian Digital Albums.)	—	124	—	— (Note: Loss of Life did not enter the France Albums Chart but peaked at number 92 on the French Physical Albums Chart.)	57	—	31	— (Note: Loss of Life did not enter the UK Albums Chart but peaked at number 15 on the UK Album Sales Chart.)	
"—" denotes a recording that did not chart or was not released in that territory.

=== Compilation albums ===
List of compilation albums, with selected information
Title	Album details
Late Night Tales: MGMT	Released: October 3, 2011 (US); Label: Late Night Stories; Formats: CD, digital download

=== Demo albums ===
List of demo albums, with selected information
Title	Album details
We (Don't) Care	Released: 2004 (US); Label: Independent; Formats: CD, internet leak
Climbing to New Lows	Released: 2005 (US); Label: Independent; Formats: Digital download, internet leak

=== Live albums ===
Title	Album details
11•11•11	Released: November 11, 2022; Label: MGMT Records; Formats: LP, digital download, streaming

== Extended plays ==
List of extended plays, with selected information
Title	EP details
Time to Pretend	Released: August 30, 2005 (US); Label: Cantora; Formats: CD, digital download
Qu'est-ce que c'est la vie, chaton?	Released: December 6, 2010 (FRA); Label: Columbia; Formats: CD, digital download
We Hear of Love, of Youth, and of Disillusionment	Released: January 3, 2011 (US); Label: Columbia; Formats: Digital download
Congratulations Remixes	Released: March 11, 2011 (US); Label: Columbia; Formats: CD, digital download

== Singles ==
=== As lead artist ===
Title	Year	Peak chart positions										Certifications	Album
Title	Year	US	US Rock	AUS	AUT	BEL	CAN	GER	IRL	NZ	UK	Certifications	Album
"Time to Pretend"	2008	— (Note: "Time to Pretend" did not enter the Billboard Hot 100, but peaked at number 9 on the Bubbling Under Hot 100 Singles chart, which acts as an extension to the Hot 100.)	— (Note: "Time to Pretend" did not enter the Hot Rock & Alternative Songs chart, but peaked at number 23 on the US Alternative Airplay chart.)	62	—	— (Note: "Time to Pretend" did not enter the Flanders Ultratop 50, but peaked at number 2 on the Ultratip chart.)	69	91	33	—	35	RIAA: 3× Platinum; BPI: Platinum; MC: Platinum; RMNZ: 2× Platinum	Oracular Spectacular
"Electric Feel"	2008	— (Note: "Electric Feel" did not enter the Billboard Hot 100, but peaked at number 14 on the Bubbling Under Hot 100 Singles chart, which acts as an extension to the Hot 100.)	— (Note: "Electric Feel" did not enter the Rock Songs chart, but peaked at number 15 on the Rock Digital Songs chart.)	7	60	17	53	88	21	10	22	RIAA: 6× Platinum; ARIA: Platinum; BPI: 2× Platinum; MC: 2× Platinum; RMNZ: 6× Platinum	Oracular Spectacular
"Metanoia"	2008	— (Note: "Metanoia" did not enter the Billboard Hot 100, but peaked at number two on the Hot Singles Sales chart.)	—	—	—	—	—	—	—	—	—		Non-album single
"Kids"	2008	91	17	21	42	19	42	48	9	29	16	RIAA: 5× Platinum; ARIA: Platinum; BPI: 3× Platinum; BVMI: 3× Gold; MC: 3× Platinum; RMNZ: 4× Platinum	Oracular Spectacular
"Flash Delirium"	2010	—	— (Note: "Flash Delirium" did not enter the Rock Songs chart, but peaked at number 23 on the Rock Digital Songs chart.)	—	—	— (Note: "Flash Delirium" did not enter the Flanders Ultratop 50, but peaked at number 10 on the Ultratip chart.)	87	—	—	—	179		Congratulations
"Siberian Breaks"	2010	— (Note: "Siberian Breaks" did not enter the Billboard Hot 100, but peaked at number 30 on the Hot Singles Sales chart.)	—	—	—	—	—	—	—	—	— (Note: "Siberian Breaks" did not enter the UK Singles Chart, but peaked at number 28 on the UK Physical Singles Sales chart.)		Congratulations
"It's Working"	2010	—	—	—	—	—	—	—	—	—	—		Congratulations
"Congratulations"	2010	— (Note: "Congratulations" did not enter the Billboard Hot 100, but peaked at number 24 on the Bubbling Under Hot 100 Singles chart, which acts as an extension to the Hot 100.)	— (Note: "Congratulations" did not enter the Rock Songs chart, but peaked at number 15 on the Rock Digital Songs chart.)	—	—	—	—	—	—	—	—		Congratulations
"Alien Days"	2013	—	—	—	—	—	—	—	—	—	— (Note: "Alien Days" did not enter the UK Singles Chart, but peaked at number 45 on the UK Physical Singles Chart Top 100.)		MGMT
"Your Life Is a Lie"	2013	—	42	—	—	— (Note: "Your Life Is a Lie" did not enter the Flanders Ultratop 50, but peaked at number 68 on the Ultratip chart.)	—	—	—	—	—		MGMT
"Little Dark Age"	2017	—	32	—	—	— (Note: "Little Dark Age" did not enter the Flanders Ultratop Top 50, but charted as an extra tip on the Flanders Ultratop Bubbling Under chart.)	—	—	—	—	—	RIAA: 2× Platinum; BPI: Platinum; RMNZ: Platinum	Little Dark Age
"When You Die"	2017	—	35	—	—	—	—	—	—	—	—		Little Dark Age
"Hand It Over"	2018	—	—	—	—	—	—	—	—	—	—		Little Dark Age
"Me and Michael"	2018	—	29	—	—	— (Note: "Me and Michael" did not enter the Flanders Ultratop Top 50, but charted as an extra tip on the Flanders Ultratop Bubbling Under chart.)	—	—	—	—	—		Little Dark Age
"In the Afternoon"	2019	—	—	—	—	— (Note: "In the Afternoon" did not enter the Flanders Ultratop 50, but peaked at number 39 on the Ultratip chart.)	—	—	—	—	—		Non-album singles
"As You Move Through the World"	2020	—	—	—	—	—	—	—	—	—	—		Non-album singles
"Mother Nature"	2023	—	— (Note: "Mother Nature" did not enter the Hot Rock & Alternative Songs chart, but peaked at number 28 on the US Rock & Alternative Airplay chart.)	—	—	—	—	—	—	—	—		Loss of Life
"Bubblegum Dog"	2023	—	—	—	—	—	—	—	—	—	—		Loss of Life
"Nothing to Declare"	2024	—	—	—	—	—	—	—	—	—	—		Loss of Life
"Dancing in Babylon" (featuring Christine and the Queens)	2024	—	—	—	—	—	—	—	—	—	—		Loss of Life
"—" denotes a recording that did not chart or was not released in that territory.

=== As featured artist ===
List of singles as featured artist, with selected chart positions and certifications, showing year released and album name
Title	Year	Peak chart positions										Certifications	Album
Title	Year	US	AUS	AUT	BEL	CAN	FRA	GER	IRL	SWI	UK	Certifications	Album
"Pursuit of Happiness" (Kid Cudi featuring MGMT and Ratatat)	2010	59	41	46	3	76	2	51	24	50	64	RIAA: 12× Platinum; ARIA: Platinum; BPI: 2× Platinum; BRMA: Gold; BVMI: Gold	Man on the Moon: The End of Day
"The Divine Chord" (The Avalanches featuring MGMT and Johnny Marr)	2020	—	—	—	— (Note: "The Divine Chord did not enter the Flanders Ultratop 50, but peaked at number 18 on the Ultratip chart.)	—	—	—	—	—	—		We Will Always Love You
"Kid Born in Space" (Cola Boyy featuring MGMT)	2021	—	—	—	—	—	—	—	—	—	—		Prosthetic Boombox
"—" denotes a recording that did not chart or was not released in that territory.

=== Promotional singles ===
List of promotional singles, with selected chart positions, showing year released and album name
Title	Year	Peak chart positions	Album
Title	Year	MEX Eng.	Album
"Weekend Wars" (Note: "Weekend Wars" was given away in summer issues of free monthly magazine Nöjesguiden in Stockholm, Sweden. Matching CDs could be picked up for free in all stores in three different shopping malls around Stockholm from June 26 to July 31.)	2007	—	Oracular Spectacular
"All We Ever Wanted Was Everything"	2011	38	Late Night Tales
"Cool Song No. 2"	2013	50	MGMT
"Goodbye Darling"	2016	—	Non-album promotional single
"—" denotes a recording that did not chart or was not released in that territory.

== Guest appearances ==
List of non-single guest appearances, with other performing artists, showing year released and album name
Title	Year	Other performer(s)	Album
"Worm Mountain"	2009	The Flaming Lips	Embryonic
"Art Is Everywhere"	2010	none	Music Is...Awesome! Volume 2
"Call from the Bank"	2010	Nipsey Hussle	The Marathon
"You Are Too Far From Me"	2011	R. Stevie Moore	Recorded For Japan benefit album
"Future Games"	2012	none	Just Tell Me That You Want Me: A Tribute to Fleetwood Mac

== Music videos ==
=== As lead artist ===
List of music videos as lead artist, with directors, showing year released
Title	Year	Director(s)
"Boogie Down"	2005	Max Goldblatt
"Destrokk"	2005	John Miserendino
"The Youth"	2008	Eric Wareheim
"Time to Pretend"	2008	Ray Tintori
"Electric Feel"	2008	Ray Tintori
"Kids"	2009	Ray Tintori
"Flash Delirium"	2010	Andreas Nilsson
"It's Working"	2010	So Me
"Congratulations"	2010	Tom Kuntz
"All We Ever Wanted Was Everything"	2011	Ned Wenlock
"Your Life Is a Lie"	2013	Tom Kuntz
"Cool Song No. 2"	2013	Isaiah Seret
"Alien Days"	2013	Sam Fleischner and Megha Barnabas
"Little Dark Age"	2017	David MacNutt and Nathaniel Axel
"When You Die"	2017	Mike Burakoff and Hallie Cooper-Novack
"Me and Michael"	2018	Joey Frank and Randy Lee Maitland
"In the Afternoon"	2019	MGMT
"Mother Nature"	2023	Jordan Fish

=== As featured artist ===
List of music videos as featured artist, with directors, showing year released
Title	Year	Director(s)
"Pursuit of Happiness" (version 1) (Kid Cudi featuring MGMT and Ratatat)	2010	Brody Baker
"Pursuit of Happiness" (version 2) (Kid Cudi featuring MGMT and Ratatat)	2010	Megaforce
