= Bear Hands discography =

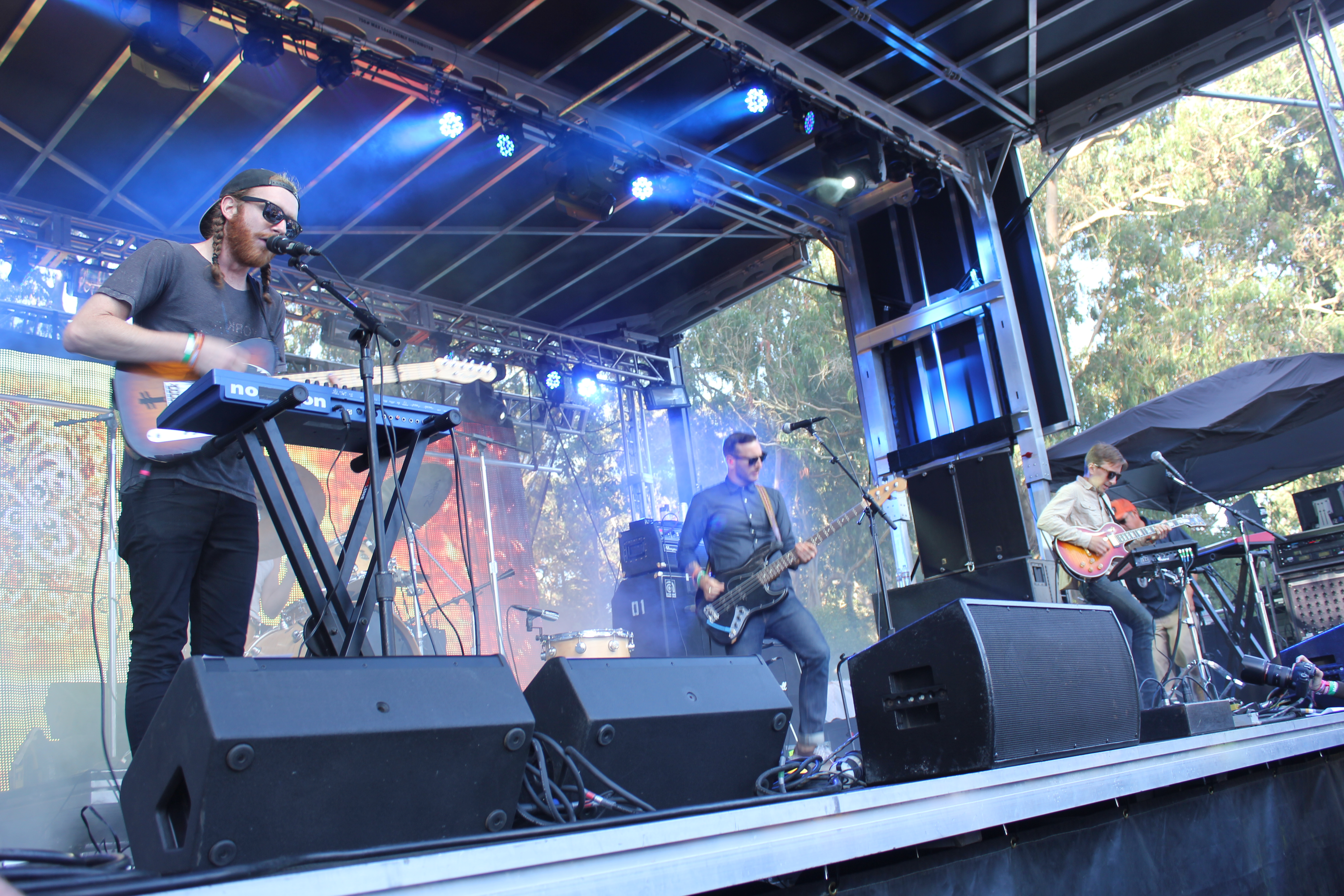
- Bear Hands in 2014
- Studio albums: 4
- EPs: 2
- Singles: 7
- Music videos: 4

The discography of American rock band Bear Hands consists of four studio albums, two extended plays (EPs), and eight singles. Bear Hands was formed in 2006 while band members Dylan Rau met Ted Feldman, attended Wesleyan University, and were later joined by Loper and Orscher through their previous bands, who were involved in the local hardcore punk scene.

== Studio albums ==
List of studio albums, with selected chart positions
Title	Album details	Peak chart positions	
Title	Album details	US Heat	US Indie
Burning Bush Supper Club	Released: November 2, 2010; Label: Cantora; Format(s): CD, LP, digital download, streaming	—	—
Distraction	Released: February 18, 2014; Label: Cantora; Format(s): CD, LP, digital download, streaming	23	—
You'll Pay for This	Released: April 15, 2016; Label: Spensive; Format(s): CD, LP, digital download, streaming	5	41
Fake Tunes	Released: May 10, 2019; Label: Spensive; Format(s): CD, LP, digital download, streaming	—	—
The Key to What	Released: October 19, 2024; Label: Cantora, Rostrum; Format(s): CD, LP, digital download, streaming	—	—
"—" denotes release that did not chart or was not released

=== Extended plays ===
- Golden EP (2007)
- Songs From Utopia Vol. 1 (2012)

== Singles ==
List of singles, with selected chart positions, showing year released and album name
Title	Year	Peak chart positions					Album
Title	Year	US Sales	US Alt	US Dance	US Rock	CAN Rock	Album
"What a Drag/Can't Stick"	2010	—	—	—	—	—	Burning Bush Supper Club
"Crime Pays"	2010	—	—	—	—	—	Burning Bush Supper Club
"High Society"	2011	—	—	—	—	—	Burning Bush Supper Club
"Tablasaurus"	2011	7	—	3	—	—	Burning Bush Supper Club
"Giants"	2013	—	8	—	33	20	Distraction
"Peacekeeper"	2014	—	—	—	—	—	Distraction
"Agora"	2014	—	17	—	— (Note: "Agora" did not enter the Rock Songs chart, but peaked at number 29 on the Rock Airplay chart.)	—	Distraction
"2AM"	2016	—	12	—	— (Note: "2AM" did not enter the Rock Songs chart, but peaked at number 20 on the Rock Airplay chart.)	37	You'll Pay for This
"Marathon Man"	2016	—	—	—	—	—	You'll Pay for This
"Boss"	2016	—	33	—	—	—	You'll Pay for This
"Back Seat Driver (Spirit Guide)"	2018	—	21	—	—	—	Fake Tunes
"Blue Lips" (featuring Ursula Rose)	2019	—	32	—	—	—	Fake Tunes
"Intrusive Thoughts"	2024	—	—	—	—	—	The Key to What
"Floor It"	2024	—	—	—	—	—	The Key to What
"Adderall / Ambien"	2024	—	—	—	—	—	The Key to What
"—" denotes single that did not chart or was not released
