= List of songs recorded by MGMT =

The following is a list of songs by MGMT. It lists 85 songs. Every song is composed by Andrew VanWyngarden and Ben Goldwasser unless otherwise specified (see: Composing credits).

== List of songs recorded ==
| Title | Year | Album | Length | Composing credits | Notes |
|---|---|---|---|---|---|
| "4th Dimensional Transition" | 2007 | Oracular Spectacular | 3:58 | | |
| "A Good Sadness" | 2013 | MGMT | 4:48 | | |
| "Alien Days" | 2012 | MGMT | 5:23 | | |
| "All We Ever Wanted Was Everything" | 2011 | Late Night Tales: MGMT | 4:25 | Daniel Ash, David J, Kevin Haskins, Peter Murphy | Bauhaus cover |
| "An Orphan of Fortune" | 2013 | MGMT | 5:31 | | |
| "Art is Everywhere" | 2008 | Music is Awesome! Volume 2 | 1:37 | Adam Deibert | |
| "As You Move Through the World" | 2020 | "In the Afternoon" | 7:34 | ? | |
| "Astro-Mancy" | 2013 | MGMT | 5:11 | | |
| "Boogie Down" | 2005 | Time to Pretend EP | 3:33 | | |
| "Brian Eno" | 2010 | Congratulations | 4:31 | | Dedicated to Brian Eno |
| "Bubblegum Dog" | 2023 | Loss of Life | 4:21 | Andrew VanWyngarden, Ben Goldwasser, James Richardson | |
| "Congratulations" | 2010 | Congratulations | 3:55 | | |
| "Cool Song No. 2" | 2013 | MGMT | 4:01 | | |
| "Dancing in Babylon" | 2024 | Loss of Life | 4:52 | Andrew VanWyngarden, Ben Goldwasser, James Richardson | features Christine and the Queens |
| "Dancing on the Beach" | 2008 | | 6:11 | ? | Only ever played live |
| "Days That Got Away" | 2018 | Little Dark Age | 4:44 | Andrew VanWyngarden, Ben Goldwasser, Connan Mockasin, Patrick Wimberly | |
| "Destrokk" | 2005 | Time to Pretend EP | 3:45 | | |
| "Electric Feel" | 2007 | Oracular Spectacular | 3:49 | Andrew VanWyngarden, Ben Goldwasser, Will Berman | Earlier demo versions have been circulating around the internet for years. |
| "Everything's Happenin' So Fast" | 2004 | We (Don't) Care | 3:30 | ? | |
| "Flash Delirium" | 2010 | Congratulations | 4:15 | | First single from the album Congratulations |
| "Forest Elf" | 2022 | 11•11•11 | 2:33 | | Originally performed on November 11, 2011, but first released officially eleven years later |
| "Future Games" | 2012 | Just Tell Me That You Want Me: A Tribute to Fleetwood Mac | 9:01 | Robert Welch | Fleetwood Mac cover |
| "Future Reflections" | 2007 | Oracular Spectacular | 4:02 | | |
| "Greyhoundredux" | 2005 | Climbing to New Lows | 4:34 | ? | |
| "Grutu (Just Becuz)" | 2005 | Climbing to New Lows | 3:30 | ? | Originally appeared on We (Don't) Care |
| "Hand It Over" | 2018 | Little Dark Age | 4:13 | | |
| "Honey Bunny" | 2005 | Climbing to New Lows | 4:21 | ? | |
| "Hot Love Drama" | 2005 | Climbing to New Lows | 4:10 | ? | |
| "I Am Not Your Home" | 2022 | 11•11•11 | 5:16 | | Originally performed on November 11, 2011, but first released officially eleven years later |
| "I Found a Whistle" | 2010 | Congratulations | 3:40 | | |
| "I Love You Too, Death" | 2013 | MGMT | 5:50 | | |
| "I Wish I Was Joking" | 2024 | Loss of Life | 3:46 | | |
| "In the Afternoon" | 2019 | "In the Afternoon" | 3:46 | | This song was originally written in 2010 while Andrew VanWyngarden was in a hospital.[1] |
| "Inbetween the Liners" | 2010 | Congratulations | 3:40 | ? | An instrumental outtake from the Congratulations sessions, with producer Pete Kember reading the liner notes written by him for the album out loud. Early demo versions of "Invocation" and "Forest Elf" can be heard when reversing the song and removing its vocals. |
| "Indie Rokkers" | 2005 | Time to Pretend EP | 4:24 | | |
| "Interlude" | 2022 | 11•11•11 | 0:26 | | Originally performed on November 11, 2011, but first released officially eleven years later |
| "Intro (Christmas From Space)" | 2005 | Climbing to New Lows | 1:28 | ? | |
| "Introduction" | 2022 | 11•11•11 | 2:28 | | Originally performed on November 11, 2011, but first released officially eleven years later |
| "Introspection" | 2013 | MGMT | 4:22 | Bruce Bradt, Faine Jade, Nick Manzi | Faine Jade cover |
| "Invocation" | 2022 | 11•11•11 | 3:11 | | Originally performed on November 11, 2011, but first released officially eleven years later |
| "It's Working" | 2010 | Congratulations | 4:06 | | |
| "James" | 2018 | Little Dark Age | 3:52 | | |
| "Kids" | 2007 | Oracular Spectacular | 5:02 | | The first "Kids" appeared on Climbing to New Lows with the name "Kids (Afterschool Dance Megamix)", and appeared on We (Don't) Care and the Time to Pretend EP. Soulwax also made a remix which appeared on the "Kids" CD single. |
| "Lady Dada's Nightmare" | 2010 | Congratulations | 4:31 | | An instrumental track inspired by the Dadaist art movement which embraced chaos and irrationality in protest of WWI. |
| "Little Dark Age" | 2017 | Little Dark Age | 4:59 | | |
| "Loss Of Life (part 2)" | 2024 | Loss of Life | 1:58 | Andrew VanWyngarden, Ben Goldwasser, James Richardson | |
| "Loss Of Life" | 2024 | Loss of Life | 5:38 | Andrew VanWyngarden, Ben Goldwasser, Jon Fridmann | |
| "Love Always Remains" | 2005 | Time to Pretend EP | 5:38 | | Originally appeared on We (Don't) Care |
| "Me and Michael" | 2018 | Little Dark Age | 4:49 | | |
| "Metanoia" | 2008 | "Metanoia" | 13:49 | | Originally an additional track on the "Time to Pretend" CD single |
| "Money to Burn" | 2005 | Climbing to New Lows | 3:24 | ? | |
| "Mother Nature" | 2023 | Loss of Life | 3:56 | Andrew VanWyngarden, Ben Goldwasser, Brian Joseph Burton | |
| "Mystery Disease" | 2013 | MGMT | 4:08 | Andrew VanWyngarden, Ben Goldwasser, Davey Johnstone, Denny Randell, Sandy Linzer | |
| "Nothing Changes" | 2024 | Loss of Life | 6:35 | Andrew VanWyngarden, Ben Goldwasser, Jon Fridmann | |
| "Nothing To Declare" | 2024 | Loss of Life | 3:33 | Andrew VanWyngarden, Ben Goldwasser | |
| "Of Moons, Birds & Monsters" | 2007 | Oracular Spectacular | 4:46 | | Holy Ghost! made a remix which appeared on the "Kids" CD single |
| "One Thing Left to Try" | 2018 | Little Dark Age | 4:20 | | |
| "Only a Shadow" | 2011 | We Hear of Love, of Youth, and of Disillusionment (Daytrotter sessions) | 3:31 | Martin Newell | The Cleaners from Venus cover |
| "People In The Streets" | 2024 | Loss of Life | 5:36 | | |
| "Phradie’s Song" | 2024 | Loss of Life | 4:54 | Andrew VanWyngarden, Ben Goldwasser, Britta Phillips, Daniel Lopatin, James Richardson, Patrick Wimberly | |
| "Pieces of What" | 2007 | Oracular Spectacular | 2:43 | | |
| "Plenty of Girls in the Sea" | 2013 | MGMT | 3:04 | | |
| "She Works Out Too Much" | 2018 | Little Dark Age | 4:38 | | |
| "Siberian Breaks" | 2010 | Congratulations | 12:09 | | |
| "Someone's Missing" | 2010 | Congratulations | 2:29 | | |
| "Something To Do With Prince" | 2013 | Spectrum / Spacemen 3 / MGMT Split 7" | 4:35 | | Originally released by Sonic Boom on the B-Side of a 7 inch vinyl |
| "Song for Dan Treacy" | 2010 | Congratulations | 3:38 | | Dedicated to Dan Treacy |
| "Tell It to Me Like It Is" | 2022 | 11•11•11 | 9:12 | | Originally performed on November 11th 2011, but first released officially eleven years later |
| "The Handshake" | 2007 | Oracular Spectacular | 3:39 | | |
| "The Kids Quartet" | 2005 | Climbing to New Lows | 2:17 | ? | |
| "The Youth" | 2007 | Oracular Spectacular | 3:48 | | |
| "Time to Pretend" | 2007 | Oracular Spectacular | 4:21 | | Originally appeared on the Time to Pretend EP |
| "TSLAMP" | 2018 | Little Dark Age | 4:29 | Andrew VanWyngarden, Ben Goldwasser, James Richardson | |
| "Under the Porch" | 2022 | 11•11•11 | 6:38 | | Originally performed on November 11th 2011, but first released officially eleven years later |
| "Unfriend" | 2022 | 11•11•11 | 5:11 | | Originally performed on November 11th 2011, but first released officially eleven years later |
| "We Care" | 2005 | Climbing to New Lows | 5:02 | ? | Originally appeared on We (Don't) Care |
| "We Don't Care" | 2005 | Climbing to New Lows | 3:56 | ? | |
| "Weekend Wars" | 2007 | Oracular Spectacular | 4:12 | | |
| "When You Die" | 2017 | Little Dark Age | 4:23 | Andrew VanWyngarden, Ariel Pink, Ben Goldwasser | |
| "When You're Small" | 2018 | Little Dark Age | 3:30 | Andrew VanWyngarden, Ben Goldwasser, James Richardson | |
| "Whistling Past the Graveyard" | 2022 | 11•11•11 | 0:30 | | Originally performed on November 11, 2011, but first released officially eleven years later |
| "Whistling Through the Graveyard" | 2022 | 11•11•11 | 2:59 | | Originally performed on November 11, 2011, but first released officially eleven years later |
| "Who's Counting" | 2022 | 11•11•11 | 4:01 | | Originally performed on November 11, 2011, but first released officially eleven years later |
| "Your Life is a Lie" | 2013 | MGMT | 2:06 | | |
| Untitled | 2023 | | 2:26 | ? | Given out on a flexi-disc at a London listening party on October 24th, 2023 |
