= Congratulations Remixes =

EP by MGMT
- Released: March 15, 2011
- Genres: Experimental rock; art rock; psychedelic rock
- Length: 21:20
- Label: Columbia
- Producer: MGMT

MGMT chronology
We Hear of Love, of Youth, and of Disillusionment (2011)	Congratulations Remixes (2011)	Late Night Tales: MGMT (2011)

Congratulations Remixes is an EP which includes remixes of 3 tracks from the MGMT release Congratulations. It was released on March 15, 2011, by Columbia Records.

== Description ==
The EP features a full 10+ minute "Siberian Breaks" remix from the Ed Banger All-Stars, an ambiguous group of collective artists on Ed Banger Records which was founded by Pedro Winter, whose stage name is Busy P, and is the home of musicians such as Justice, SebastiAn, Mr. Oizo, Breakbot, and many others. The remix defies all boundaries of the generic "remix", blending many genres of all music, not only electric. The exact artists who had a hand in the collective remix of this song is unclear. Also included is a remix of "Congratulations" by Erol Alkan, a London-based DJ known as an originator of mashups and one of the most acclaimed DJs of the last decade, reworked the title track "Congratulations". The final track was remixed by Japanese artist/producer, Cornelius, who remixed the band's song "Brian Eno". These join the previously released remixes of "It's Working" by Air and Violens.

== Artwork ==
The cover of this EP is an alternative version that was used of cover in the album Congratulations (created by Anthony Ausgang) but this is characteristic in that it is oriented toward the right side (the original is oriented toward the left side) and as a main feature it has the negative colors of the original colors, except the eyes of the cat's surfer, which remain white.

== Track listing ==
Digital download
No.	Title	Length
1.	"Congratulations" (Erol Alkan Rework)	6:37
2.	"Siberian Breaks" (Ed Banger All Stars Remix)	10:20
3.	"Brian Eno" (Cornelius Mix)	4:12
Total length:		21:06

== Remixes ==
The remix of "Congratulations" by Erol Alkan was released on the single "Congratulations" on November 26, 2010.

The remix of "Siberian Breaks" by Ed Banger All-Stars was given as a free download if you bought any vinyl on the MGMT Store before January 1, 2011.

The remix of "Brian Eno" by Cornelius was released on the Japanese re-release of Congratulations as a bonus track on July 21, 2010.
