= List of awards and nominations received by MGMT =

MGMT awards and nominations
Awards and nominations
| Award | Wins | Nominations |
| Grammy | 0 | 2 |
| MTV VMA | 0 | 3 |
| Much | 0 | 1 |
| NME | 4 | 5 |
| Teen Choice Awards | 0 | 1 |
| Fuse TV | 0 | 1 |
| URB Awards | 0 | 1 |

Totals (Note: Certain award groups do not simply award one winner. They acknowledge several different recipients, have runners-up, and have third place. Since this is a specific recognition and is different from losing an award, runner-up mentions are considered wins in this award tally. For simplification and to avoid errors, each award in this list has been presumed to have had a prior nomination.)
- Wins: 5
- Nominations: 15

MGMT was nominated for the 2010 Grammy Award for Best New Artist, and their track "Kids" was nominated for Best Pop Performance By a Duo or Group with Vocals. These are the first Grammy nominations for the band. At the 2009 Grammy Awards, the Justice remix of "Electric Feel" won the Grammy for Best Remixed Recording, Non-Classical.

== Antville Music Video Awards ==
The Antville Music Video Awards are online awards for the best music video and music video directors of the year. They were first awarded in 2005. MGMT has received one awards from six nominations.

| Year | Nominee / work | Award | Result |
|---|---|---|---|
| 2013 | "Cool Song No.2" | Best Cinematography | Won |
| 2013 | "Cool Song No.2" | Best Art Direction | Nominated |
| 2013 | "Cool Song No.2" | Best Narrative | Nominated |
| 2013 | "Cool Song No.2" | Video of the Year | Nominated |
| 2013 | "Your Life is a Lie" | Best Editing | Nominated |
| 2013 | Themselves | Best Commissioning Artist | Nominated |

== Grammy Awards ==
The Grammy Awards are awarded annually by the National Academy of Recording Arts and Sciences of the United States.

| Year | Nominee / work | Award | Result |
|---|---|---|---|
| 2010 | "Kids" | Best Pop Performance by a Duo or Group with Vocals | Nominated |
| 2010 | MGMT | Best New Artist | Nominated |

== MTV Video Music Awards ==
The MTV Video Music Awards is an annual awards ceremony established in 1984 by MTV.

| Year | Nominee / work | Award | Result |
|---|---|---|---|
| 2008 | "Electric Feel" | Best Art Direction | Nominated |
| 2010 | "Flash Delirium" | Best Rock Video | Nominated |
| 2014 | "Your Life Is a Lie" | Best Editing | Nominated |

== mtvU Woodie Awards ==
| Year | Nominee / work | Award | Result | Ref. |
|---|---|---|---|---|
| 2008 | MGMT | Woodie of the Year | Nominated | |
| 2009 | MGMT | Woodie of the Year | Nominated | |

== Music Video Production Awards ==
The MVPA Awards are annually presented by a Los Angeles-based music trade organization to honor the year's best music videos.

| Year | Nominee / work | Award | Result |
|---|---|---|---|
| 2008 | "Time to Pretend" | Best Director of a New Artist | Won |
| 2008 | "Time to Pretend" | Best Directional Debut | Won |

== iHeartRadio Much Music Video Awards ==
The iHeartRadio Much Music Video Awards are annual awards presented by the Canadians music video channel Much to honour the year's best music videos.

| Year | Nominee / work | Award | Result |
|---|---|---|---|
| 2010 | "Flash Delirium" | Best International Group Video | Nominated |

== NME Awards ==
The NME Awards is an annual music awards show in the United Kingdom, founded by the music magazine, NME.

| Year | Nominee / work | Award | Result |
|---|---|---|---|
| 2008 | "Time to Pretend" | Best Breakthrough Track | Won |
| 2009 | "Time to Pretend" | Best Track | Won |
| 2009 | Oracular Spectacular | Best Album of 2008 | Won |
| 2009 | MGMT | Best New Band | Won |
| 2011 | Congratulations | Best Album Artwork | Nominated |

== Teen Choice Awards ==
The Teen Choice Awards is a teen awards show presented annually by Fox.

| Year | Nominee / work | Award | Result |
|---|---|---|---|
| 2010 | "MGMT" | Rock Group | Nominated |

== Fuse TV Awards ==
| Year | Nominee / work | Award | Result |
|---|---|---|---|
| 2010 | "MGMT" | Best New Artists | Nominated |

== URB Awards ==
| Year | Nominee / work | Award | Result |
|---|---|---|---|
| 2010 | "Kids" | Song of the Decade | Nominated |
