= Mother Nature (MGMT song) =

2023 song by MGMT

Single by MGMT

from the album Loss of Life
- Released: October 31, 2023
- Genre: Psychedelic folk; psychedelic rock; psychedelic pop; folk-rock
- Length: 3:56
- Label: MGMT; Mom + Pop; BMG
- Songwriters: Ben Goldwasser; Brian Burton
- Lyricists: Goldwasser; Andrew VanWyngarden; Burton

MGMT singles chronology
"As You Move Through the World" (2020)	"Mother Nature" (2023)	"Bubblegum Dog" (2023)

"Mother Nature" is a song by the American rock band MGMT. The track was first released on October 31, 2023, as the lead single in promotion of the band's fifth studio album Loss of Life, released on February 23, 2024. The track features additional production from Danger Mouse, Oneohtrix Point Never, and MGMT live member James Richardson.

In a statement about the single, MGMT stated that the track “outlines the archetypical MGMT mythology of one hero attempting to get the other hero to come on the journey that they ‘must’ go on. One part sounds like Oasis.”

== Reception ==
Danielle Chelosky of Stereogum described the track as being the "sonic equivalent of sunshine", furthermore, noting that while much of the band's music has this sound, it comes from warm guitar rather than buzzing synthesizers. Writing for BrooklynVegan, Andrew Sacher described "Mother Nature" as a light, breezy, psych-folk-pop track. Jake Brown of Glorious Noise believed the track was reminiscent to the bands 2010 single "Congratulations". Carys Anderson of Consequence noted the tracks more grounded sound when compared to much of the bands earlier, more psychedelic music.

Amanda Lang of Euphoria said that the track marked a departure from the typical " hippie dance vibes and more of a show of proof that they have no need to change their sound to keep relevant". Overall, stating that the band remains "refreshingly clean and simple. It’s what makes it such comforting music for both potheads and daytime ravers." In a review by JamBands, the track was stated as seamlessly melding guitars and synth elements in a "classic yet elevated MGMT fashion".

== Music video ==
The animated video, directed by Jordan Fish, was released alongside the single. According to Fish in a statement about the video: “I hope the story makes people happy and feel connected to family, friends, and the animal kingdom as well.” The video shows a Dog and Turtle team up to defeat an evil pet collector.

== Track listing ==
Digital download and streaming
No.	Title	Length
1.	"Mother Nature"	3:56

== Personnel ==
MGMT

- Ben Goldwasser – vocals, bass, harmonica, keyboards, production, engineering, guitars
- Andrew VanWyngarden – vocals, bass, drums, guitars, harmonica, keyboards, production

Technical

- Brian Burton – production assistance
- Matthew C – engineering
- Greg Calbi – mastering
- Dave Fridmann – mixing, engineering
- Mike Fridmann – engineering
- Daniel Lopatin – production assistance
- James Richardson – engineering
- Miles BA Robinson – engineering, production assistance
- Nathan Salon – engineering
- Patrick Wimberly – production

== Charts ==
Chart performance for "Mother Nature"
Chart (2023)	Peak position
US Rock & Alternative Airplay (Billboard)	28
