= Qu'est-ce que c'est la vie, chaton? =

EP by MGMT
- Released: December 6, 2010
- Venue: Bataclan
- Genre: Psychedelic rock
- Length: 24:11
- Label: Columbia
- Producer: MGMT

MGMT chronology
Congratulations (2010)	Qu'est-ce que c'est la vie, chaton? (2010)	We Hear of Love, of Youth, and of Disillusionment (2011)

Qu'est-ce que c'est la vie, chaton? (English: "What's life, kitten?"), is the third EP released by MGMT, and their first live release. It contains one song from the Time to Pretend EP, one from their first LP Oracular Spectacular and three songs from their second LP Congratulations. It is only available in France.

In October 2010, MGMT gave three concerts in Paris at the Bataclan (7th, 8th and 9th) for the promotion of their album Congratulations; the concert on day 8 was broadcast online by the internet music streaming service Spotify on its website. Five of the songs played were released on this EP, which is available as digital download on iTunes and Amazon.

The album art is by Japanese-American contemporary artist Chaz B. Gangster.

== Track listing ==
No.	Title	Length
1.	"Weekend Wars" (live in Paris 2010)	5:09
2.	"Flash Delirium" (live in Paris 2010)	4:48
3.	"Destrokk" (live in Paris 2010)	4:41
4.	"Congratulations" (live in Paris 2010)	4:27
5.	"Brian Eno" (live in Paris 2010)	5:46
Total length:		24:11
