= Late Night Tales: MGMT =

Compilation album by MGMT
- Released: October 3, 2011
- Length: 77:24
- Label: Night Time Stories
- Producers: Andrew VanWyngarden, Ben Goldwasser
- Compilers: Andrew VanWyngarden, Ben Goldwasser

MGMT chronology
Congratulations Remixes (2011)	Late Night Tales: MGMT (2011)	MGMT (2013)

Late Night Tales chronology
Late Night Tales: Trentemøller (2011)	Late Night Tales: MGMT (2011)	Late Night Tales: Belle and Sebastian Vol. II (2012)

Professional ratings
Review scores
Source	Rating
AllMusic	4/5 stars
Pitchfork	7.8/10

Late Night Tales: MGMT is a mix album compiled by the band MGMT's members Andrew VanWyngarden and Ben Goldwasser and released on October 3, 2011. The album is the 25th in the Late Night Tales series.

According MGMT, "The band's Late Night Tales selection of post-punk, cult indie and counter-culture figureheads reflects the band's multifaceted sound, and draws comparisons with contemporary dreampop/chillwave/shoegaze/folk scenes on both sides of the Atlantic."

Their compilation features tracks from artists such as the Velvet Underground, Felt, Suicide, Spacemen 3, and Disco Inferno. It also features an exclusive MGMT's cover of the Bauhaus song "All We Ever Wanted Was Everything" from their 1982 album The Sky's Gone Out.

== History ==
On October 3, 2011, an animated music video was released for MGMT's cover "All We Ever Wanted Was Everything," directed by Ned Wenlock for Hoverlion.

On October 24, 2011 the light used in the MGMT Late Night Tales album artwork was released for consumer purchase.

MGMT Light

== Track listing ==
No.	Title	Artist(s)	Length
1.	"Can't See Through It"	Disco Inferno	3:52
2.	"Love You Girl"	The Great Society	3:09
3.	"Cheree"	Suicide	3:41
4.	"Stop and Smell the Roses"	Television Personalities	4:04
5.	"Ocean"	The Velvet Underground	5:45
6.	"Red Indians"	Felt	1:56
7.	"Laughing Boy"	Julian Cope	5:47
8.	"For Belgian Friends"	The Durutti Column	5:25
9.	"Mound of Clay"	Charlie Feathers	2:28
10.	"Song for Wilde"	Mark Fry	2:33
11.	"All We Ever Wanted Was Everything" (Bauhaus cover)	MGMT	4:25
12.	"Troubled Mind"	Cheval Sombre	5:46
13.	"Drug Song"	Dave Bixby	3:23
14.	"Hearts Are Like Flowers"	The Jacobites	4:12
15.	"Pink Frost"	The Chills	4:00
16.	"Sparks"	Martin Rev	3:30
17.	"Melancholy Man"	The Wake	7:22
18.	"Lord Can You Hear Me?"	Spacemen 3	4:34
19.	"Morning Splendour"	Pauline Anna Strom	5:59
20.	"Lost for Words (Part 2)"	Paul Morley	3:23
Total length:			77:24
