= MGMT (album) =

Studio album by MGMT
- Released: September 17, 2013
- Recorded: February 27, 2012 – August 2013
- Studio: Tarbox Road (Cassadaga, New York)
- Genres: Neo-psychedelia; psychedelic pop; indie rock
- Length: 44:10
- Label: Columbia
- Producers: Dave Fridmann; MGMT

MGMT chronology
Late Night Tales: MGMT (2011)	MGMT (2013)	Little Dark Age (2018)

Singles from MGMT
- 1. "Alien Days" Released: April 20, 2013; 2. "Your Life Is a Lie" Released: August 6, 2013

MGMT is the third studio album by American band MGMT. It was released on September 17, 2013, by Columbia Records; however, the band started streaming the album on September 9, 2013.

== Background ==
On September 27, 2010, an interview article in Spin quoted MGMT as saying that they would have less freedom on this album, claiming that Columbia Records was not happy with the reception of the band's second album Congratulations. MGMT later denied these statements in an email to Pitchfork, who cited the article on their own site as a side note to a different story, stating that they were not "even close to starting the process of making a new album," that "label-relations are currently quite friendly," and finally telling readers "Don't believe everything that you read (even on Pitchfork.com)."

In an interview with American Songwriter published on November 8, 2010, Andrew VanWyngarden and Ben Goldwasser said their third album will be self-titled, and that "usually if we say something and it gets published, we stick to it. That's what happened with Congratulations." Regarding the content of the album, Goldwasser said "Something that'd be fun to do is have a decent number of songs on the album that can easily be extended or have sections that could turn into a really trance-y, repetitive thing live."

When in Argentina to perform on January 22, 2011, they told Rocktails they have worked on some sounds but that there are no clear ideas yet.

On February 28, 2011, they told Coup de Main magazine that they will be on tour until April, when they will begin work on demos for the third album. On January 26, 2012, MGMT confirmed in an interview with Gibby Haynes of Butthole Surfers in the inaugural issue of Intercourse magazine that they had started work on the album. VanWyngarden stated that he has written five songs, inspired by R.E.M. On February 27, the band began recording the album at Tarbox Road Studios with producer Dave Fridmann.

On March 1, Andrew VanWyngarden revealed in an interview that they will perform new songs on their upcoming shows in Argentina, Chile, Mexico, Colombia, Brazil and Puerto Rico. On March 30, the band premiered a new song, "Alien Days", at a show in Bogotá, Colombia. at the Festival Estereo Picnic. The song was also played at the following shows in Latin America. On August 3, Andrew VanWyngarden told "The Morning Call" that their new album was "too good not to talk about". He said he was enjoying it, it sounds close to Congratulations, and they're "making good songs".

On January 29, 2013, the band told Rolling Stone that they "are not trying to make music that everyone understands the first time they hear it." They also confirmed that a song entitled "Mystery Disease" and a cover of Faine Jade's 1968 track "Introspection" will be included on the album. On March 4, 2013, MGMT released information about their 2013 tour that started on April 26 and ended on May 18. On March 6, 2013, MGMT's producer Dave Fridmann stated on his website that the album was about to be finished.

On June 9, the band confirmed on their official Twitter account that they were going to finish the album cover later that day. On June 10, Dave Fridmann updated his website with the news that the album could be out sometime in August. On June 25, MGMT revealed via their website that the album is due for release on September 17, 2013. The band confirmed via Twitter that their new video for "Your Life Is a Lie" will come out on August 5, and it's accompanied with an interactive kaleidoscopic video embedded on their official website. MGMT released their full album "MGMT" prematurely via Twitter on September 9 saying they had a "surprise". Days before its official release, the pre-release of the album was made in the service Rdio on September 9, 2013.

== Artwork ==
Photographer and film director Danny Clinch was hired by Columbia Records to photograph the band for publicity photos and the album's packaging artwork. The cover artwork features VanWyngarden and Goldwasser and a lawnmower on the lawn in front of Stylz Unlimited, a hair salon and clothing consignment store in Dunkirk, New York. The store is a short distance from Tarbox Road Studios in Cassadaga, New York, where the album was recorded. Art direction and design for the packaging was completed by graphic designer Alejandro Cardenas.

== Release ==
On March 22, 2013, the Record Store Day release was confirmed to be a cassette tape containing the studio version of "Alien Days" and was made available on April 20. Its video was released on October 31, 2013, and was directed by indie director Sam Fleischner. The first video released from the album was for the track "Your Life Is a Lie", which was directed by Tom Kuntz, and was released on August 6, 2013.

The album features a variety of unique visual elements to accompany and illuminate the music via "The Optimizer", which provides listeners a simultaneously aural and optical listening experience featuring video and CGI work, and is available as part of an enhanced album package on all commercial formats.

== Critical reception ==
Professional ratings
Aggregate scores
Source	Rating
AnyDecentMusic?	5.8/10
Metacritic	62/100
Review scores
Source	Rating
AllMusic	4/5 stars
Alternative Press	4.5/5 stars
The A.V. Club	D
The Guardian	4/5 stars
The Independent	2/5 stars
NME	4/5 stars
Pitchfork	6.2/10
Q	3/5 stars
Rolling Stone	3.5/5 stars
Spin	4/10

According to review aggregator website Metacritic, the album received an average critic review score of 62/100, based on 37 reviews, indicating generally favorable reviews. Mike Usinger of Alternative Press said of the album, "Beyond weird? Yes, but in the best, most deliciously mind-bending of ways." Tom Pinnock of NME gave the album an 8/10, saying, "MGMT might be a comfortable journey at times, but it's also a transcendental one you've never been on before. Forget the shareholders – it's time for us to give MGMT a proper chance, on their own terms." Spin, however, called it a "confused, confusing album," and that it will "leave you as confused as they seem to be." Chris Bosman of Consequence of Sound gave the album a negative score, saying, "The record's thick textures feel like canvases that have been painted over too many times, and its genre excursions have had the life practiced out of them. A looser take on MGMT would likely have been a rousing success. Jon Pareles of The New York Times said, "Something's always looming and buzzing — or burbling, or clattering, or tapping, or ratcheting, or blipping, or quavering — near the foreground throughout MGMT's third album, MGMT. It makes the album both testing and, eventually, rewarding." Luke O'Neil of The Boston Globe said, "Occasionally the band's vision pays off here." Kevin Liedel of Slant Magazine said, "The swampy, claustrophobic MGMT is never as interesting or smart as the crowd-pleasing sing-alongs on Oracular Spectacular."

== Track listing ==
All lyrics are written by Andrew VanWyngarden; all music is composed by Andrew VanWyngarden and Ben Goldwasser except where listed.

MGMT
No.	Title	Music	Length
1.	"Alien Days"		5:09
2.	"Cool Song No. 2"		4:01
3.	"Mystery Disease"	VanWyngarden; Goldwasser; Davey Johnstone; Denny Randell; Sandy Linzer	4:08
4.	"Introspection"	Faine Jade; Bruce Bradt; Nick Manzi	4:22
5.	"Your Life Is a Lie"		2:06
6.	"A Good Sadness"		4:48
7.	"Astro-Mancy"		5:11
8.	"I Love You Too, Death"		5:50
9.	"Plenty of Girls in the Sea"		3:04
10.	"An Orphan of Fortune"		5:31
Total length:			44:10

Japanese edition bonus track
No.	Title	Length
11.	"A Good Sadness" (μ-Ziq Remix)	5:02
Total length:		49:12

== Personnel ==
MGMT

- Andrew VanWyngarden
- Ben Goldwasser

Production

- Dave Fridmann – co-production, engineering, mixing
- MGMT – co-production

== Charts ==
Chart (2013)	Peak position
Australian Albums (ARIA)	31
Austrian Albums (Ö3 Austria)	29
Belgian Albums (Ultratop Flanders)	28
Belgian Albums (Ultratop Wallonia)	29
French Albums (SNEP)	26
German Albums (Offizielle Top 100)	44
Irish Albums (IRMA)	29
Italian Albums (FIMI)	79
Spanish Albums (Promusicae)	65
Swiss Albums (Schweizer Hitparade)	15
UK Albums (Official Charts)	45
US Billboard 200	14
US Top Alternative Albums (Billboard)	2
