= Bubblegum Dog =

2023 song by MGMT

Single by MGMT

from the album Loss of Life
- Released: November 29, 2023
- Genre: Indie rock; glam rock
- Length: 4:21
- Label: MGMT; Mom + Pop; Dirty Hit; BMG
- Songwriters: Ben Goldwasser; James Richardson
- Lyricists: Goldwasser; Andrew VanWyngarden; Richardson
- Producers: Daniel Lopatin; MGMT; Patrick Wimberly

MGMT singles chronology
"Mother Nature" (2023)	"Bubblegum Dog" (2023)	"Nothing to Declare" (2024)

"Bubblegum Dog" is a song by the American rock band MGMT. It was first released on November 29, 2023, as the second single for the band's fifth studio album Loss of Life as the fifth track. A music video, directed by Tom Scharpling and Julia Vickerman was released alongside the track, it was noted for featuring many homages to 90's pop culture & music.

== Background ==
The song had first been announced back in 2016 through a Periscope livestream that revealed the titles of tracks the band were working on, with one of them being "Bubblegum Dog". Upon its being left off of the bands next studio album Little Dark Age, the band has joked about the track's existence, frequently posting "Bubblegum Dog is real" on Twitter.

The final track features musician and composer Sean Lennon on keyboards as well as live musician James Richardson on guitars.

== Reception ==
The track has been described as a "wacky rock ballad", fitting well with the video. Jo Vito of Consequence of Sound called the track an "indie rock bop with punchy drums" with an acoustic opening, fuzzed-out bottom end, and a dissonant piano line "adding color throughout".

In a review by Stay Free Radio, they noted how MGMT seems to defy expectations on the track, starting as a gentle acoustic piece in line of their previous work before taking a "delightful twist". They also described the track as featuring punchy drums and a fuzzy bassline. Overall, they state that the track "blossoms into a mid-tempo indie rock song" that keeps listeners engaged for what's next through sonic detours. They also note hints of alternative rock nostalgia throughout. Lyrically, the review states that they believe the track has to do with internal conflict, existential angst, and the weight of time. Furthermore, believing that the "Bubblegum Dog" in the lyrics is a metaphor for nagging fear, suppressed anxieties, or consequences of past actions. Ultimately, the review states the song is about the "struggle to confront uncomfortable truths about oneself and the inevitability of life's challenges."

Amar Gera of Life Without Andy described the track as a "trippy, mind-bending creation that is impossible not to vibe out to". Moreover, the track was described as an "amalgamation of various corners of MGMT's discography", including Oracular Spectacular tracks "Kids" and "Electric Feel" and the title-track off of Little Dark Age. Due to this, they believed the track "caters to fans old and new".

== Music video ==
A scene from the video serving as an homage to MTV Unplugged concerts.

The video, released alongside the track, was directed by Tom Scharpling and Julia Vickerman. The video has been noted for being reminiscent of 90's alternative rock videos, featuring many homages to pop culture of that era such as MTV Unplugged. The video was teased on The Best Show with Tom Scharpling the previous day, with Scharpling describing it as the best video he had ever done. In a statement, Scharpling and Vickerman said that:

“We all saw the video for “Bubblegum Dog” as an opportunity to combine the charming, DIY, surreal, cardboard craft aesthetic of shows like Yo Gabba Gabba and The Mighty Boosh with these ultra-serious grunge videos we grew up watching on MTV – all that heavy, brooding angst smashed up against absurd childlike fun,"

Further elaborating on this, Scharpling and Vickerman added that:

“Ben and Andrew are legitimately funny guys, so we were excited they got to really go for it with their acting, paying homage to the eternally moody mid-90’s rock stars they looked up to when they were kids. They were completely game for everything, playing around with different wigs/costumes/personas/facial hair and continually chiming in with new ideas along the way. That was a wonderful feeling, because it let us know they were having a good time. For the climax of the video, they let us shoot gallons of pink slime at their faces, which we appreciated. Ben got quite a bit in his mouth, which was unintentional … but he thought it was funny, so then we were allowed to think it was funny.”

The video includes specific references to The Smashing Pumpkins "Today", Pearl Jam's "Jeremy", Stone Temple Pilots "Vasoline" and "Interstate Love Song", Red Hot Chili Peppers "Under the Bridge", Soundgarden's "Black Hole Sun" and Alice in Chains Unplugged among others. It also features a cameo from actor and comedian Mark Proksch from The Office and What We Do in the Shadows.

== Track listing ==
Digital download and streaming
No.	Title	Length
1.	"Bubblegum Dog"	4:21
2.	"Mother Nature"	3:56
Total length:		8:18

== Personnel ==
MGMT

- Ben Goldwasser – vocals, harmonica, keyboards, production, engineering, guitars
- Andrew VanWyngarden – vocals, bass, drums, guitars, harmonica, keyboards, production

Additional musicians

- Sean Lennon – keyboards
- James Richardson – guitars

Technical

- Matthew C – engineering
- Greg Calbi – mastering
- Dave Fridmann – mixing, engineering
- Mike Fridmann – engineering
- Daniel Lopatin – production assistance
- Miles BA Robinson – engineering, production assistance
- Patrick Wimberly – production
