= Blue Lips =

Blue Lips may refer to:

- Blue Lips (film), a 2018 short film
- "Blue Lips" (song), a 2019 song by Bear Hands
- Blue Lips (Tove Lo album), 2017
- Blue Lips (Schoolboy Q album), 2024
