= We Hear of Love, of Youth, and of Disillusionment =

EP by MGMT
- Released: January 3, 2011
- Recorded: October 2010
- Venue: Moogfest in Asheville, NC
- Genre: Psychedelic rock
- Length: 15:10
- Label: Columbia Records
- Producer: MGMT, Jon Ashley

MGMT chronology
| Qu'est-ce que c'est la vie, chaton? (2010) | We Hear of Love, of Youth, and of Disillusionment (2011) | Congratulations Remixes (2011) |

We Hear of Love, of Youth, and of Disillusionment is a Daytrotter session recorded at the first Moogfest in Asheville, North Carolina by MGMT. It contains a cover of "Only a Shadow", a song originally performed by The Cleaners from Venus. The song was part of several of MGMT's setlists on their tour dates for the promotion of their second album Congratulations, and this release marks the first studio take on the song.

The session can be listened to online at Daytrotter, and the cover illustration was made by the Daytrotter team member Johnnie Cluney.

== Track listing ==
Digital download
| No. | Title | Length |
|---|---|---|
| 1. | "Song for Dan Treacy" | 3:40 |
| 2. | "It's Working" | 4:21 |
| 3. | "I Found a Whistle" | 3:40 |
| 4. | "Only a Shadow" (The Cleaners from Venus cover) | 3:32 |
| Total length: | | 15:10 |
