= Agora (Bear Hands song) =

Single by Bear Hands

from the album Distraction
- Released: March 24, 2014
- Genre: Indie rock, experimental rock
- Length: 3:08
- Label: Cantora
- Songwriter(s): Ted Feldman, Val Loper, TJ Orscher, Dylan Rau

Bear Hands singles chronology
"Giants" (2013)	"Agora" (2014)	"2AM" (2016)

"Agora" is a song by American experimental rock band Bear Hands. The song was released in early 2014 as the second single from the band's second album, Distraction, and peaked at number 17 on the Billboard Alternative Songs chart.

== Commercial performance ==
The song was the second song by the band to chart, reaching number 17 on the Billboard Alternative Songs chart.

== Charts ==
Chart (2014)	Peak position
US Rock & Alternative Airplay (Billboard)	29
US Alternative Airplay (Billboard)	17

== Release history ==
Region	Date	Format	Label
United States	January 29, 2014	Digital download	Cantora Records
