= Alien Days =

Single by MGMT

from the album MGMT
- Released: April 20, 2013
- Recorded: February 2011 (demo) September 2011 - June 2012
- Genre: Psychedelic rock, neo-psychedelia, psychedelic pop
- Length: 5:10
- Label: Columbia
- Songwriters: Andrew VanWyngarden, Ben Goldwasser

MGMT singles chronology
"Congratulations" (2010)	"Alien Days" (2013)	"Your Life Is a Lie" (2013)

Music video
- "Alien Days" on YouTube

"Alien Days" is the first single released from MGMT, the third album by MGMT, which was released as a cassette single on April 20, 2013. VanWyngarden explains the song as the feeling when "a parasitic alien is in your head, controlling things". The music video was filmed by indie director Sam Fleischner, which was the second video released for the promotion of the album. This was the first single released by MGMT since 2010's Congratulations.

== History ==
MGMT demoed the song in February 2011. On March 30, 2012, the band premiered "Alien Days", at a show in Bogotá, Colombia, at the Festival Estereo Picnic.

On March 11, 2013, MGMT confirmed on their Twitter account that a Record Store Day release would be a cassette tape (with download card) of the studio version of "Alien Days", which became available on April 20. On March 22, 2013, RSD confirmed that this single will be a Record Store Day exclusive limited release. On April 17, the band previewed the song in a stop motion video showing the unpacking of the cassette.
On October 31 the band premiered video via Noisey.

== Track listing ==
Cassette Single
No.	Title	Length
1.	"Alien Days" (Side A)	5:10
2.	"Message 7 from Hearty White" (Side B)	5:15

== Personnel ==
- Andrew VanWyngarden – vocals, guitar, bass, drums
- Ben Goldwasser – synths and samples
- Trevor – Child vocals^{[A]}

=== Notes ===
- A Trevor is the son of Cool Little Music Shop's owner at Fredonia, NY where the band purchase some of their instruments.
