= Distraction (album) =

Studio album by Bear Hands
- Released: February 18, 2014
- Recorded: 2013; Cantora Studios; New York City
- Genre: Experimental rock, indie rock, post-punk
- Length: 35:46
- Label: Cantora
- Producer: Ted Feldman

Bear Hands chronology
| Burning Bush Supper Club (2010) | Distraction (2014) | You'll Pay For This (2016) |

Singles from Distraction
- 1. "Giants" Released: January 13, 2014; 2. "Peacekeeper" Released: April 3, 2014; 3. "Agora" Released: March 24, 2014

Professional ratings
Review scores
| Source | Rating |
|---|---|
| AllMusic | Favorable |
| Alternative Press | 4/5 stars |
| PopMatters | (5/10) |
| Rolling Stone | 3/5 stars |

Distraction is the second album by experimental rock outfit Bear Hands.

== Track listing ==
1. "Moment of Silence" (3:19)
2. "Giants" (3:08)
3. "Agora" (2:40)
4. "Bone Digger" (3:31)
5. "Vile Iowa" (2:55)
6. "Bad Friend" (2:51)
7. "The Bug" (3:29)
8. "Peacekeeper" (2:54)
9. "Sleeping on the Floor" (2:36)
10. "Party Hats" (4:59)
11. "Thought Wrong" (3:24)

== Charts ==
| Chart (2016) | Peak position |
|---|---|
| US Heatseekers Albums (Billboard) | 23 |
