= Golden EP =

EP by Bear Hands
- Released: July 5, 2007
- Genre: Indie rock
- Label: Self-released

Bear Hands chronology
Golden EP (2007)	Burning Bush Supper Club (2010)

Golden EP is the self-released debut EP by Bear Hands.

== Track listing ==
No.	Title	Length
1.	"Long Lean Queen"	3:21
2.	"Golden"	4:09
3.	"Sickly Brunette"	3:44
4.	"Bad Blood"	2:55

== Release history ==
Region	Date	Format	Label
UK	July 5, 2007	Audio CD	Self-released
