= Burning Bush Supper Club =

Studio album by Bear Hands
- Released: November 2, 2010
- Recorded: April–August 2010; Cantora Studios; New York City
- Genre: Experimental rock, indie rock, post-punk
- Length: 45:53
- Label: Cantora
- Producer: Ted Feldman

Bear Hands chronology
Golden EP (2008)	Burning Bush Supper Club (2010)	Distraction (2014)

Singles from Burning Bush Supper Club
- 1. "What a Drag/Can't Stick Em" Released: February 16, 2010; 2. "Crime Pays" Released: November 28, 2010; 3. "High Society" Released: March 29, 2011

Professional ratings
Review scores
Source	Rating
AllMusic	4/5 stars
Pitchfork	(7.1/10)
Spin	6/10 stars
The Washington Post	Favorable

Burning Bush Supper Club is the debut album by experimental rock outfit Bear Hands.

== Track listing ==
1. "Crime Pays" (2:59)
2. "Belongings" (4:01)
3. "What a Drag" (3:03)
4. "High Society" (2:33)
5. "Tablasaurus" (3:13)
6. "Julien" (3:54)
7. "Wicksey Boxing" (4:01)
8. "Blood and Treasure" (2:21)
9. "Can't Stick 'Em" (3:25)
10. "Camel Convention" (3:08)
11. "Tall Trees" (1:29)
