= Giants (Bear Hands song) =

Single by Bear Hands

from the album Distraction
- Released: October 22, 2013
- Genre: Indie rock, electronic rock, rap rock, dance-punk, experimental rock
- Length: 3:08
- Label: Cantora
- Songwriter(s): Ted Feldman, Val Loper, TJ Orscher, Dylan Rau

Bear Hands singles chronology
| "High Society" (2011) | "Giants" (2013) | "Agora" (2014) |

"Giants" is a song by American experimental rock band Bear Hands. The song was released in late 2013 as the lead single from the band's second album, Distraction, and peaked at number eight on the Billboard Alternative Songs chart. The song is featured in the 2014 ice hockey video game NHL 15.

== Commercial performance ==
The song was the first song by the band to chart, reaching number eight on the Billboard Alternative Songs chart.

== Charts ==
=== Weekly charts ===
| Chart (2014) | Peak position |
|---|---|
| Canada Rock (Billboard) | 20 |
| US Hot Rock & Alternative Songs (Billboard) | 33 |
| US Rock Airplay (Billboard) | 15 |
| US Alternative Airplay (Billboard) | 8 |

=== Year-end charts ===
| Chart (2014) | Position |
|---|---|
| US Rock Airplay (Billboard) | 42 |
| US Alternative Songs (Billboard) | 21 |

== Release history ==
| Region | Date | Format | Label |
|---|---|---|---|
| United States | October 22, 2013 | Digital download | Cantora Records |
