= Ode to Quetzalcoatl =

1969 album by Dave Bixby

Ode To Quetzalcoatl

Recording by Dave Bixby
- Released: 1969
- Genres: Christian folk, Psychedelic folk
- Length: 40:18
- Language: English

Dave Bixby chronology
Ode To Quetzalcoatl (1969)	Second Coming (1970)

Ode to Quetzalcoatl is the first album by American singer-songwriter Dave Bixby, released in 1969. Though originally pressed in limited quantities, the album garnered a cult following in the decades following its release. It was reissued by Spanish label Guerssen in 2009, bringing a large influx of attention to the album and to Bixby from global music collectors and folk music enjoyers. It is considered a definitive work in underground folk.

== Recording ==
In 1968, Bixby became involved in the counterculture movement of the time, even embracing a hippie lifestyle. However, after going through a severe depressive episode that he later referred to as "the void", (a result of nearly daily LSD usage) Bixby underwent a spiritual transformation and turned to Christianity. Ode to Quetzalcoatl documents his personal journey through depression, addiction, and his eventual embrace of God.

Bixby recorded the album using an "echo-laden" four track reel-to-reel tapemachine in a living room.

== Track listing ==
All tracks are written by Dave Bixby.

No.	Title	Length
1.	"Drug Song"	03:22
2.	"Free Indeed"	03:24
3.	"I Have Seen Him"	03:19
4.	"Mother"	03:05
5.	"Morning Sun"	03:38
6.	"Prayer"	03:19
7.	"Lonely Faces"	04:00
8.	"Open Doors"	03:08
9.	"666"	03:14
10.	"Waiting For The Rains"	02:18
11.	"Secret Forest"	05:04
12.	"Peace"	02:27
Total length:		40:18

== Personnel ==
- Dave Bixby - writing, performance
- Brian MacInness - backing vocals
- Jane Symmie - backing vocals
- David Campbell - front cover photography
