= Fake Tunes =

Studio album by Bear Hands
- Released: May 10, 2019
- Genre: Alternative rock; experimental rock; rap rock; art rock
- Length: 35:58
- Label: Spensive (SPEN004-1)
- Producer: Christopher Chu

Bear Hands chronology
You'll Pay for This (2016)	Fake Tunes (2019)	The Key to What (2024)

Singles from Fake Tunes
- 1. "Back Seat Driver (Spirit Guide)" Released: April 5, 2018; 2. "Blue Lips" Released: January 3, 2019

Fake Tunes is the fourth studio album by American experimental rock band, Bear Hands. The album was released on May 10, 2019, through Spensive Sounds.

== Release and promotion ==
Two weeks after the release of Fake Tunes, Bear Hands opened for Twenty One Pilots during the second North American leg of The Bandito Tour. Bear Hands opened for Twenty One Pilots from May 12 to June 30, 2019. From October 8 to November 29, 2019, Bear Hands will co-headline with X Ambassadors in promotion of the album.

=== Singles ===
The first single, "Back Seat Driver (Spirit Guide)", was released on April 5, 2018. The single was the highest charting and highest streaming single on the album, reaching number 21 on the Alternative Songs charts, specifically peaking at that place on June 9, 2018.

The second single, "Blue Lips" featuring backing vocals from Ursula Rose, was released on January 3, 2019. The single peaked at number 32 on the Billboard Alternative Songs charts during the week of March 23, 2019. The single was well received critically and described as having a range of influences in sound and style, ranging from indie rock, rap rock, and jangle pop.

== Critical reception ==
Professional ratings
Review scores
Source	Rating
QRO Magazine	8/10
Selective Memory	3/5 stars

Writing for QRO Magazine, Ted Chase described that the album has the capability of being a major hit saying "perhaps they're too artistic to be as big as the likes of Twenty One Pilots (who they recently toured with), and too tough to pin down, genre-wise. But that's because they actually successfully mix their influences into something special." Chase gave the album an 8 out of 10.

Andrew Duncan, writing for Selective Memory magazine offered a more mixed review of Fake Tunes. Duncan said that the album sees Bear Hands "caught between a rock and a hard place. Too young to slow down but too adult to be reckless, that is the underlying presence within the songwriting of Fake Tunes. Bear Hands have always been an intriguing fixture in the indie rock world, yet Fake Tunes is a crossroads." Duncan gave Fake Tunes three stars out of five

== Track listing ==
All music is composed by Dylan Rau, Val Loper, and TJ Orscher.

No.	Title	Length
1.	"Blue Lips" (featuring Ursula Rose)	3:36
2.	"Mr. Radioactive"	3:02
3.	"Friends In High Places"	2:54
4.	"Back Seat Driver"	3:49
5.	"Reptilians"	3:43
6.	"Ignoring the Truth"	3:12
7.	"Clean Up California"	3:55
8.	"Exes"	3:09
9.	"Pill Hill"	2:33
10.	"Blame"	3:24
11.	"Confessions" (featuring Ursula Rose)	2:41
Total length:		35:58
