= Rumspringa (band) =

American rock band

- Origin: Los Angeles, California, USA
- Genres: Indie rock, blues
- Years active: 2005–2014
- Label: Cantora Records
- Members: Joey Stevens; Ricardo Robles; Andrew Parker

Rumspringa is a rock band from Los Angeles, California. The band's name was inspired by the Amish rite of passage, Rumspringa, and the rhetorical rebirth and exploration it represents.

Rumspringa formed in 2006 as a duo with Joey Stevens on guitar/vocals and Itaru De la Vega on drums.

Starting in 2010, the duo shifted over to a full band with two new musicians, including a new drummer. Ricardo Robles joined on bass, Cecilia Della Peruta on guitar, and Andrew Parker on drums. Parker is also a member of the band Soft Sailors.

== Sway(2010) Track List ==
No.	Title	Length
1.	"Queer Eyed Boy"
2.	"Musical Chairs"
3.	"Sway"
4.	"Criminal Love"
5.	"Triptych"
6.	"Beast"
7.	"Personal Effects"
8.	"Casper"
9.	"Shake Em' Loose Tonight"
10.	"Witches Milk"
11.	"Going Down South"
