= 2AM (Bear Hands song) =

Single by Bear Hands

from the album You'll Pay For This
- Released: February 17, 2016
- Genre: Experimental rock, psychedelic rock
- Length: 4:56 (album version); 4:33 (radio edit)
- Label: Spensive Sounds
- Songwriter(s): Ted Feldman, Val Loper, TJ Orscher, Dylan Rau

Bear Hands singles chronology
"Agora" (2014)	"2AM" (2016)	"Marathon Man" (2016)

"2AM" is a song by American experimental rock band Bear Hands. The song was released in early 2016 as the promotional single from the band's third album, You'll Pay for This, and peaked at number 12 on the Billboard Alternative Songs chart.

== Commercial performance ==
The song was the third song by the band to chart, reaching number 12 on the Billboard Alternative Songs chart.

== Charts ==
=== Weekly charts ===
Chart (2016)	Peak position
Canada Rock (Billboard)	37
US Rock Airplay (Billboard)	20
US Alternative Airplay (Billboard)	12

=== Year-end charts ===
Chart (2016)	Position
US Alternative Songs (Billboard)	35

== Release history ==
Region	Date	Format	Label
United States	February 17, 2016	Digital download	Spensive Sounds
