= Dave Bixby =

American singer-songwriter

- Born: David Bixby; 1950 (age 75–76); Grand Rapids, Michigan, U.S.
- Origin: Michigan, U.S.
- Genres: Christian folk; psychedelic folk
- Occupations: Singer; songwriter; musician
- Instruments: Vocals; guitar
- Years active: 1960s–present
- Website: davebixby.com

David Bixby is an American singer-songwriter, best known for his folk album Ode to Quetzalcoatl (1969) which saw renewed attention after being rediscovered in the 21st century. Bixby has also been involved in the Harbinger Orchestra.

== Early life ==
David Bixby was born in Grand Rapids, Michigan in 1950. He graduated high school in 1968.

== Career ==
=== 1960s ===
In 1968, Bixby became involved in the 1960s counterculture movement, embracing a hippie lifestyle. However, after experiencing a severe depressive episode that he later referred to as "the void", (a result of nearly daily LSD usage) Bixby underwent a spiritual transformation and turned to Christianity. His music, particularly the album Ode to Quetzalcoatl, reflects this profound shift in his life.

Bixby recorded his seminal album Ode to Quetzalcoatl in 1969, documenting his personal journey through depression, addiction, and his eventual embrace of God. The album, known for its haunting and raw emotional tone, is considered a definitive work in underground folk. Originally pressed in limited quantities, Ode to Quetzalcoatl gained a cult following over the decades. It was reissued in 2009 by the Spanish label Guerssen, bringing Bixby's music to the attention of global collectors and folk music enthusiasts.

Following his spiritual awakening, Bixby became involved with a Michigan-based Christian group known simply as "The Group," which was often described as a religious cult focused on the Second Coming. The group was led by Don DeGraaf, often referred to as 'Sir.' Bixby became deeply involved in the group's activities, which included organizing concerts to promote both the group's teachings and their music. He collaborated with other members of the group to record Second Coming under the name Harbinger. The album continued to explore themes of spiritual rebirth and personal salvation. Reflecting on his time in the group, Bixby noted, "When you're in a cult, you don't know it's a cult."

=== 1970s–1990s ===
By 1972, "The Group" faced growing scrutiny from churches and concerned parents over allegations of brainwashing and cult-like behavior. This led DeGraff to relocate the group to Florida, and eventually, Bixby became disillusioned with the movement. Bixby left the organization in 1974.

Bixby moved to northern New Mexico, where he lived in the mountains. In the late 1970s, he moved to Arizona and began performing as a musician in various venues, writing radio jingles, and creating music for local studios. By 1980, Bixby had relocated to Seattle, Washington, where he worked for a major television station.

In 1983, Bixby became a sailor and lived aboard a sailboat named Free Spirit. He explored the Puget Sound and the San Juan Islands, participating in historical reenactments and living a semi-nomadic lifestyle. However, a shipwreck in 1990 off the coast of California caused him to lose most of his possessions.

In the early 1990s, Bixby returned to Arizona, where he worked as a State Park Ranger along the Colorado River. He continued to perform music, including teaming up with Gary Peaslee to form the duo "The Coconuts," which played 1960s rock and Jimmy Buffett-style songs.

=== 2000s–2020s ===
In 2007, collectors of rare private press records resurrected Bixby's early music, leading to the reissues of both Ode to Quetzalcoatl and Second Coming by Guerssen Records. This revival led to Bixby performing internationally.

== Discography ==
- Ode to Quetzalcoatl (1969)
- Second Coming (1971) – as Harbinger
- Return of Quetzalcoatl 2012 (2023)
- Harbinger Orchestra (2023) – with Harbinger Orchestra
- Terraferma (Welcome to Earth) (2024)
