= Loss of Life =

2024 studio album by MGMT

Studio album by MGMT
- Released: February 23, 2024
- Recorded: August 2021 – Mid 2023
- Genres: Neo-psychedelia; indie rock
- Length: 45:09
- Labels: Mom + Pop; BMG
- Producers: MGMT; Patrick Wimberly

MGMT chronology
| 11•11•11 (2022) | Loss of Life (2024) |

Singles from Loss of Life
- 1. "Mother Nature" Released: October 31, 2023; 2. "Bubblegum Dog" Released: November 29, 2023; 3. "Nothing to Declare" Released: January 10, 2024; 4. "Dancing in Babylon" Released: February 20, 2024

Loss of Life is the fifth studio album by the American rock band MGMT. It was released on February 23, 2024, making it their label debut on Mom + Pop in the United States and internationally on BMG Rights Management, and their first studio album since 2018's Little Dark Age. It features a guest appearance by French singer Christine and the Queens, making it the first feature on an MGMT album.

== Background ==
On September 21, 2023, Andrew VanWyngarden posted a picture of a vinyl "test pressing" with a banana on top on Reddit, accompanied by the caption "elf of soils". The latter was reported to be an anagram of what would be the album title. The title was first hinted at on April 5 through a photo captioned "Just got done cooking L.O.L." by VanWyngarden.

Loss of Life is the long-awaited follow-up to 2018's Little Dark Age. The album was produced by MGMT (Andrew VanWyngarden, Ben Goldwasser) along with Patrick Wimberly. Longtime collaborator Dave Fridmann mixed the album as he has done on the group's past four full lengths. On Loss of Life, additional production was supplied by Daniel Lopatin and James Richardson. Brian Burton provides additional production on "Mother Nature" and Miles A. Robinson served as associate producer and engineer across the album.

In a statement, the duo revealed that they were "very proud" of the album and described it as a "relatively painless birth after a lengthy gestation period". Musically speaking, they explained to have run at around "20% adult contemporary" but "no more than this". Announced on October 31, Loss of Life was their first studio offering in six years and their first since leaving Columbia Records. The lead single "Mother Nature" was released the same day and tells the story of "one hero attempting to get the other hero to come on the journey" that they have to carry on.

MGMT has previously released videos for album tracks "Mother Nature", "Bubblegum Dog", "Nothing to Declare", "Dancing in Babylon" and "People in the Streets".

== Critical reception ==
Professional ratings
Aggregate scores
| Source | Rating |
|---|---|
| AnyDecentMusic? | 7.5/10 |
| Metacritic | 80/100 |
Review scores
| Source | Rating |
| AllMusic | 3.5/5 stars |
| Clash | 7/10 |
| Exclaim! | 7/10 |
| The Guardian | 4/5 stars |
| NME | 4/5 stars |
| Paste | 7.9/10 |
| Pitchfork | 6.9/10 |
| PopMatters | 7/10 |
| The Skinny | 4/5 stars |
| Slant Magazine | 4/5 stars |

Loss of Life received positive reviews from critics. At Metacritic, which assigns a normalized rating out of 100 to reviews from mainstream critics, the album has an average score of 80 based on 20 reviews, indicating "generally favorable" reviews.

Fred Thomas from AllMusic stated, "Loss of Life is restrained for MGMT's track record, still managing to express personality and abstract thinking (musical and lyrical) while keeping huge melodies in the forefront. It's not a return to form, a return to pop, or really a return of any kind, just a continuation of the band's blissfully weird frames of mind and a record that includes some of their strongest songs in years.

In a 6.9/10 review for Pitchfork, Andy Cush wrote, "Resurrecting old schlock in queasy new definition is not a novel pursuit in 2024. Loss of Life distinguishes itself through its use of this soft-rock accelerationist aesthetic to bolster the thematic punch of Goldwasser and VanWyngarden's songs, which come across as equally awed and aghast at our era's technological splendor and the crushing dehumanization it inflicts upon all but the most fortunate. Their palette of references serves a dual function: The arrangements' gaudy spectacle reflects the feeling of life in a wonderland of convenience, entertainment, and alienation, even as their palpable sense of yearning earnestly suggests the possibility that love could help us to transcend this well-appointed hell we've made. At its best, this unification of sounds and ideas also serves to heighten the experience of these songs as songs, not only on the intellectual plane, but also in that more mysterious place, closer to our hearts, where we take stock of pop music's innumerable variables, then subject their product, through a chain of involuntary and intuitive reactions, to one more-or-less binary judgment: Is it hitting or not?"

In his "10 best albums of 2024," Russell Falcon for KTLA News in Los Angeles ranked Loss of Life at no. 9, writing that though the album is a "grower," it is "more complex instrumentally than its predecessor, bigger in scope and a more interesting project, especially in the full context of the band's career."

== Track listing ==
All lyrics are written by Andrew VanWyngarden; all music is composed by VanWyngarden and Ben Goldwasser; except where noted

Loss of Life track listing
| No. | Title | Music | Length |
|---|---|---|---|
| 1. | "Loss of Life (Part 2)" | Andrew VanWyngarden; Ben Goldwasser; James Richardson | 1:58 |
| 2. | "Mother Nature" | VanWyngarden; Goldwasser; Brian Burton | 3:56 |
| 3. | "Dancing in Babylon" (featuring Christine and the Queens) | VanWyngarden; Goldwasser; Richardson | 4:52 |
| 4. | "People in the Streets" | | 5:36 |
| 5. | "Bubblegum Dog" | VanWyngarden; Goldwasser; Richardson | 4:21 |
| 6. | "Nothing to Declare" | | 3:33 |
| 7. | "Nothing Changes" | VanWyngarden; Goldwasser; Jon Fridmann | 6:35 |
| 8. | "Phradie's Song" | VanWyngarden; Goldwasser; Daniel Lopatin; Britta Phillips; Richardson; Patrick Wimberly | 4:54 |
| 9. | "I Wish I Was Joking" | | 3:46 |
| 10. | "Loss of Life" | VanWyngarden; Goldwasser; Fridmann | 5:38 |
| Total length: | | | 45:09 |

Japanese edition bonus tracks
| No. | Title | Length |
|---|---|---|
| 11. | "In the Afternoon" | 3:46 |
| 12. | "As You Move Through the World" | 7:35 |
| Total length: | | 56:38 |

== Personnel ==
MGMT

- Ben Goldwasser – vocals, bass, harmonica, keyboards, production, engineering (all tracks); guitars (tracks 1–6, 8–10)
- Andrew VanWyngarden – vocals, bass, drums, guitars, harmonica, keyboards, production

Additional musicians

- Christine and the Queens – vocals (track 3)
- Nels Cline – guitars (track 2)
- Rolph Harris – horns (tracks 7, 10)
- Timothy Kieper – percussion (tracks 4, 6, 8)
- Sean Lennon – keyboards (track 5)
- Danny Meyer – clarinet (track 10)
- Britta Phillips – vocals (track 8)
- James Richardson – guitars (tracks 1, 5); electronic wind instrument, keyboards (1); French horn (7), clavinet (8)

Technical

- Brian Burton – production assistance (tracks 2, 3)
- Matthew C – engineering (tracks 2, 4–6, 8)
- Greg Calbi – mastering
- Sam Darwish – engineering (tracks 3, 4, 6–9)
- Dave Fridmann – mixing, engineering
- Mike Fridmann – engineering (tracks 2–10)
- James Kirk – engineering (track 3)
- Daniel Lopatin – production (tracks 8, 10), production assistance (2–4, 6)
- James Richardson – engineering, production assistance (track 1)
- Miles BA Robinson – engineering, production assistance
- Nathan Salon – engineering (tracks 2, 4, 6–8)
- Patrick Wimberly – production

== Charts ==
Chart performance for Loss of Life
| Chart (2024) | Peak position |
|---|---|
| Australian Digital Albums (ARIA) | 21 |
| Australian Physical Albums (ARIA) | 21 |
| Belgian Albums (Ultratop Flanders) | 131 |
| Belgian Albums (Ultratop Wallonia) | 185 |
| German Albums (Offizielle Top 100) | 57 |
| Portuguese Albums (AFP) | 65 |
| Scottish Albums (Official Charts) | 19 |
| Swiss Albums (Schweizer Hitparade) | 31 |
| UK Album Downloads (Official Charts) | 13 |
| UK Independent Albums (Official Charts) | 6 |
| US Independent Albums (Billboard) | 49 |
| US Top Album Sales (Billboard) | 22 |
