= You'll Pay for This =

Studio album by Bear Hands
- Released: April 15, 2016
- Recorded: 2015
- Genre: Experimental rock, indie rock, post-punk
- Length: 43:01
- Label: Spensive Sounds

Bear Hands chronology
Distraction (2014)	You'll Pay for This (2016)	Fake Tunes (2019)

Singles from You'll Pay for This
- 1. "2AM" Released: February 17, 2016; 2. "Marathon Man" Released: March 11, 2016

Professional ratings
Review scores
Source	Rating
AllMusic	Favorable
Alternative Press	4/5 stars
The Guardian	2/5 stars
Under The Gun	7.5/10 stars

You'll Pay for This is the third album by experimental rock band Bear Hands. It is their last album to feature guitarist Ted Feldman before his departure in January 2018.

== Track listing ==
1. "I Won't Pay" (2:55)
2. "2AM" (4:55)
3. "Boss" (3:06)
4. "Déjà Vu" (3:17)
5. "Too Young" (3:45)
6. "The Shallows" (3:41)
7. "Like Me Like That" (3:50)
8. "Chin Ups" (3:25)
9. "Marathon Man" (4:13)
10. "Winner's Circle" (3:22)
11. "I See You" (3:27)
12. "Purpose Filled Life" (3:05)

== Charts ==
Chart (2016)	Peak position
US Independent Albums (Billboard)	41
US Heatseekers Albums (Billboard)	5
