= Anthony Ausgang =

American painter

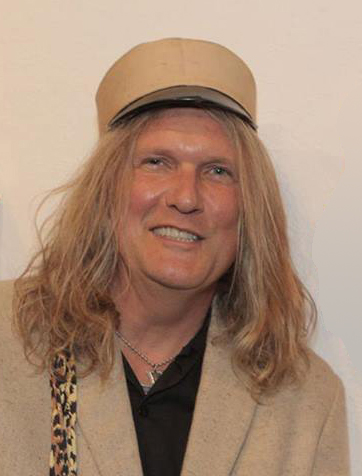
- Ausgang in 2017
- Born: Anthony Charles Grant Thompson; May 22, 1959 (age 67); Pointe-à-Pierre, Trinidad and Tobago
- Known for: Art
- Movement: Lowbrow
- Website: ausgangart.com

Anthony Ausgang (born Anthony Charles Grant Thompson, May 22, 1959) is an artist and writer born in Pointe-à-Pierre, Trinidad and Tobago in 1959 who lives and works in Los Angeles. Ausgang is a principal painter associated with the lowbrow art movement, one of "the first major wave of lowbrow artists" to show in Los Angeles in the early 1980s. The protagonists of his paintings are cats – "psychedelic, wide eyed, with a kind of evil look in their eyes".

== Biography ==
He was schooled at the Otis Art Institute in Los Angeles. In 1990, Ausgang had his first solo show at the 01 Gallery in Hollywood. Among the places he has exhibited are: La Luz de Jesus, The Laguna Art Museum's "Kustom Kulture" show, Kantor Gallery. Merry Karnowsky Gallery, Roq La Rue Gallery, LA Municipal Gallery, and Copro Gallery. In 2009, Ausgang's work was included in the exhibition Apocalypse Wow! at the Museum of Contemporary Art of Rome in Italy, and in late 2012, Ausgang was the featured international artist at the Rewind show in Bologna celebrating the 50th anniversary of Fender guitar in Italy.

Congratulations (2010) cover art by Anthony Ausgang

By 1993, Ausgang's artistic production consisted of customized cars, original acrylic paintings, and commercial merchandise, including clothing, puzzles, toys, lighters, and posters. Laguna Art Museum commissioned Ausgang to design a hole for a miniature golf course exhibit at South Coast Plaza in 1996. As a "successful artist who appears in several magazines and exhibitions a year", Ausgang also boasts an impressive list of commercial clients including Tower Records, MTV, Sony Music and David Lee Roth. In 2003, Ausgang designed the cover for Dude Descending a Staircase, the fourth studio album by the British band Apollo 440.

In 2010, Ausgang did the cover art for MGMT's second studio album Congratulations, "an eye grabbing illustration that could easily been found on a Grateful Dead release circa 1974" which was nominated by NME for the Best Art Vinyl of 2010. In 2011, Ausgang designed the Christmas windows for the La Rinascente Department Store in Milan with larger-than-life three-dimensional models of his trademark psychedelic cartoon cats.

KeroseneBomb published Ausgang's first fiction book The Sleep of Puss Titter: A Lysenkoist Life in the Random-Word Generation in 2011. "Vacation from Reality" is the anthology of his major artworks up to 2007. His artwork is featured in several anthologies, including Weirdo Deluxe: The Wild World of Pop Surrealism & Lowbrow Art by Matt Dukes Jordan and Pop Surrealism by Kirsten Anderson. LA Weekly magazine commissioned a painting by Ausgang for their annual "Best Of ... " special issue in 2000. In 2011, Anthony Ausgang received the lifetime achievement award at Beyond Eden's annual art fair at Barnsdall Art Park.

== Books ==
- Vacation from Reality: The Art of Anthony Ausgang (9mm Books, 2007) ISBN 978-0-9766-3250-4
- Weirdo Deluxe: The Wild World of Pop Surrealism & Lowbrow Art by Matt Dukes Jordan, Artist Anthology (Chronicle Books, 2005) ISBN 978-0-8118-4241-9
- LA Artland: Contemporary Art from Los Angeles by Chris Kraus, Ariana Fox, Artist Anthology (Black Dog Publishing, 2005) ISBN 978-1-9047-7230-9
- Pop Surrealism by Kirsten Anderson, Artist Anthology (Last Gasp, 2004) ISBN 978-0-8671-9618-4
- Morning Wood by Roger Gastman, Artist Anthology (Gingko Press, 2003) ISBN 978-1-58423-159-2
- Taboo: The Art of Tiki by Martin McIntosh, Artist Anthology (Outre Gallery Press, 1999) ISBN 978-0-6463-7731-5
- Kustom Kulture by Ron Turner, Artist Anthology (Last Gasp, 1993) ISBN 978-0-8671-9405-0
- Juxtapoz Car Culture by Kevin Thomson, Artist Anthology (Gingko Press, 2009) ISBN 978-1-5842-3347-3
