= Your Life Is a Lie =

Single by MGMT

from the album MGMT
- Released: August 6, 2013
- Genre: Pop
- Length: 2:04
- Label: Columbia
- Songwriters: Andrew VanWyngarden, Ben Goldwasser

MGMT singles chronology
"Alien Days" (2013)	"Your Life Is a Lie" (2013)	"Cool Song No. 2" (2013)

"Your Life Is a Lie" is the second single released from the third album by MGMT, which was released as an instant download with the album pre-order on August 6, 2013.

In an interview with XFM, VanWyngarden explained the meaning behind of this song: "'Your Life Is a Lie' in particular was never meant to be directed at our fans or anybody in particular. What it's meant for more is to be utilized as a kind of weapon that you can direct towards whoever you want and it's supposed to be an empowering song."

== History ==
A promotional picture for the release of the video, it shows Andrew and Ben holding a banner with the name of the song.

The band first premiered the song live at the Portland State Theater on April 30, and was later performed on following shows through North America as their spring 2013 tour.

In the July 2013 issue of NME magazine, the song is explained as "a burst of clattering, misanthropic buzz-pop vitriol"; while Relix Magazine explains it as a "lyrically dark song". In this same interview, VanWyngarden explains that he wrote the song "while tripping hard on acid by a fire".

On August 5, the band premiered the music video for this song, which was directed by Tom Kuntz; the promotion of the video it's accompanied with an interactive kaleidoscopic video embedded on their official website. A day after, the single was given as a free download with the album pre-order on iTunes.

On the August 22 episode of The Late Show with David Letterman, the band appeared and performed the song. On August 28, Pitchfork premiered a 'Sunroof Remix' of the song made by Mute Records founder Daniel Miller, alongside producer Gareth Jones.

== Reception ==
Rolling Stone listed "Your Life is a Lie" as the 98th-best song of the year, calling it, "a two-minute skull-boring pop nugget that makes the title's argument with such ear-wormy power."

== Track listing ==
No.	Title	Length
1.	"Your Life Is a Lie"	2:04
2.	"Your Life Is a Lie" (A Sunroof Mix by Daniel Miller and Gareth Jones)	6:57
