= Tom Kuntz =

American director and filmmaker

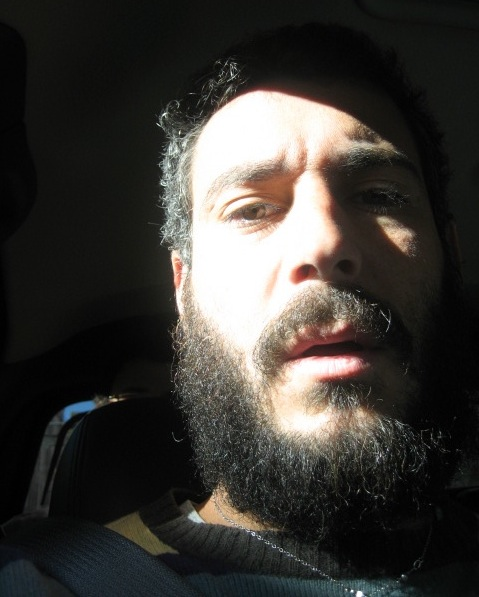
- Kuntz in 2005
- Born: July 7, 1972 (age 54)
- Occupations: Director, filmmaker

Tom Kuntz (born July 7, 1972) is an American director and filmmaker who is most known for his television commercials and music videos, which either have colorful settings, time-lapse photography or wildly eccentric humans. He has enjoyed multiple nominations for the honor of ‘Best Commercial Director of the Year’ by the DGA (Directors Guild of America; 2007, 2009, 2010, 2013, 2016)

In August 2010, Kuntz's Old Spice "The Man Your Man Could Smell Like" spot won the Emmy for "Commercial of the Year."

== Career ==
Kuntz began his directing career at MTV where he (and former creative partner Mike Maguire) created many noteworthy commercials promoting the channel, including a famous batch of commercials for the MTV music awards starring actor Ben Stiller.

Kuntz quickly left MTV and began directing full-time through Propaganda Films and then through MJZ where he has maintained solo representation since 2001.

== Music videos ==
- The Avalanches - "Frontier Psychiatrist" (2001)
- Electric Six – "Danger! High Voltage" (2002)
- Electric Six – "Gay Bar" (2003)
- Electric Six – "Radio Gaga" (2004)
- The Bumblebeez – "Dr. Love" (2007)
- LCD Soundsystem – "All My Friends" (2007)
- MGMT - "Congratulations" (2010)
- Music for Sleeping Children - "Georgia" (2012)
- MGMT - "Your Life Is a Lie" (2013)

== Commercials ==
- Altoids - "Fruit Pants", "Slap", "Half and Half", "Invention", "Promotion", "Printer"
- Amp'd Mobile - "Rock Star", "Senator", "Bus Kiss"
- Apple - "Appocalypse", "Call Me With Timothee Chalamet", “Charged”, “Found” and “Powered”
- AT&T - "Taylor Swift Now"
- Axe - "Chocolate Man", "The Chain"
- Bacardi - "Dance Floor"
- Boost Mobile - "Loopt"
- Bud Light - "Entrance", "Amy"
- Bundaberg - "Clear Character"
- Cadbury's - "Eyebrows", "Bubbly"
- CareerBuilder - "Tips"
- Carlton Draught - "Nosehair", "Leg", "Tingle", "Weenis"
- Citroën - "Baby"
- Clash of Clans - "Revenge"
- Coca-Cola - "Tow Truck", "Crave", "Library"
- Dell - "Colors"
- DirecTV - "Roadside Ditch", "Stray Animals", "Platoon", "Wig Shop", "House", "Funeral", "Questions", "Shower", "Pants", "Night", "Motorcycle", "Super Creepy", "Less Attractive", "Painfully Awkward", "Crazy Hairy", "Scrawny Arms", "Meathead", "Overly Paranoid", "Total Deadbeat", "Arts & Craftsy", "Bad Comedian", "CableWorld", "Cable You - Andrew Luck", "Cable You - Tony Romo", "Cable You - Eli Manning", "Now You Can"
- Dos Equis - "Keep It Intersante", "Moon"
- ESPN - "Is It Monday Yet?", "Exit Away", "Stone's Throw"
- FedEx - "Carrier Pigeons", "Family Business", "Bed & Breakfast", "Hotshots", "Open Floor Plan"
- Fruit by the Foot - "Replacement"
- GEICO - "Octopus"
- Got Milk? - "White Gold Is", "White Gold the Artist", "One Gallon Axe", "Tame the White Tiger", "Viper", "Muscles", "Battle for Milkquarious",
- Guinness Clear - "Guinness Clear"
- Hahn Super Dry - "Pioneering Beering"
- HBO Go - "Elevator", "Pen", "Fan", "Tuxedo"
- Heineken - "The Odyssey", "The Chase"
- HomeAway - "Get HomeAway From It All"
- Hulu - "Hello from Hulu"
- Hyundai - "Feel the Feeling - Cologne", "Feel the Feeling - Headphones", "Feel the Feeling - Hairdryer"
- IHOP - "Pancakes, Pancakes, Pancakes"
- IKEA - Silence The Critics
- Keystone Light - "Rescue", "Bride"
- KFC - "Nashville Secret"
- Kraft - "Eagle"
- Loto - "Out of Office"
- Lyft - "Nope, Yep"
- Mastercard - "Marathon Man", "MacGyver"
- Mike's Hard Lemonade - "Bowling", "Hibachi"
- Miller Lite - "GHT at the Bar"
- Moneysupermarket.com - "Epic Action Man"
- The Natural Confectionery Company - "Raphael", "Outdo", "Mumble", "Trumpets"
- Netflix - "One Billion"
- New York Lottery - "Medieval", "UFO"
- Old Spice - "Foam", "Scents for Gents", "The Man Your Man Could Smell Like", "Questions", "Boat", "Scent Vacation", "Sea Captain", "Motorcycle", "Muscle Music Keyboard Key", "Poker Face", "Irresistible", "Meeting", "Boardwalk", "That's the Power of Hair", "Soccer", "Nightclub", "Stairs", "Hot Tub", "And So It Begins", "Interruption", "Checkmate", "Lid", "Windsurfing", "Tank", "Truce"
- Oreo - "Whisper Fight", "Life Raft"
- Oxygen - "Support", "Hot Flashes"
- Pimm's - "The Call Up"
- Skittles - "Touch", "Beard", "Rabbit", "Leak", "Stable", "Pinata Man", "Tailor"
- Snickers - "Tank"
- Sorbent - "Homecoming"
- Sprint - "Balcony"
- Starbucks - "Hank"
- Tanqueray - "Globe Probe"
- Tooheys - "Tall Men"
- Toon Blast - "PSA", "Body Double"
- Tubi - "Rabbit Holes"
- Toyota Camry - "It's Reinvented"
- Truth - "Magical Amount", "Typo", "Stork",
- Virgin Mobile - "House of Paygoism", "Booty Call", "Baby", "Funeral Pyre", "Poof", "Thing", "Closet", "First Date"
- Virgin Trains - "Spandau or Speedcore - Plane vs. Train", "Spandau or Speedcore - Train vs. Car"
- Volkswagen - "Get Happy", "Wings"
- Washington's Lottery - "Keith", "Harry"
- Wonderful Pistachios - "Part 1", "Part 2"
- Xbox 360 - "Lips"
- Xbox Live - "Marketplace", "Arcade", "Friends List", "Gamer Zones"
- Yopa - "Smooth Move"

== Short films ==
In 2000, Kuntz (and Maguire) released the 6-minute short film Tokyo Breakfast. The spoof sitcom is a parody of the Japanese perception of day-to-day doings of an American family, with an emphasis on the skewed emulation of a perceived black culture. Characters use the term "nigga" with unusual frequency and familiarity. The film appeared in numerous film festivals and also spread as an Internet phenomenon.

Kuntz is also featured in the docu-short “Beez-lapse” which features a locked off camera showing him drawing on actors for ten hours in time lapse photography (in prep for the shooting of his Bumblebeez “Dr. Love” video.)

== Feature films ==
Kuntz (and Maguire) were briefly involved with the satirical newspaper The Onion's feature film, The Onion Movie, and shot initial footage for the project, but the two walked away from the project citing creative differences with the producers. Though numerous websites still cite Kuntz and Maguire as the directors of the released film, Kuntz and Maguire are officially not the directors of record.

== Holiday virals ==
Kuntz (along with friend and collaborator Matt Dilmore) is also the creator of three holiday viral films that spread throughout cyberspace in 2007, 2008 and 2010 respectively.

The first, Santasm.net features two strange-looking semi-nude men in a dark room with some Christmas lights strung up around them. What at first appears to be a still image, slowly begins to move as we see the slighter of the two men begin to suckle the teat of the larger man. The large man laughs maniacally and then the film is over.

The second, Warmandfuzzyfeeling.com features a Norman Rockwell-esque, silver-haired couple seated by a Christmas tree. The woman opens a large, wrapped present and gleefully reveals a small puppy dog with an abnormally large human penis.

The third, Itstoastyinhere.com features two overweight, middle-aged men dressed in Dickensian attire, seated in front of an ornate fireplace. As the camera dollies-in on the burning fire, two chalices filled with (presumably) egg nog enter frame. As the camera then dollies-out, it becomes revealed that each man's long, snakelike penis clutch the chalices. They toast and laugh maniacally.

All three virals share a signature visual style of lens flares and extreme slow-motion camerawork as well as the same music track—a slowed down, warped version of the song "A Pied Piper (Petit Pierrot)" from "The Singing Nun", accented by sleigh bells.

== Pinchy & Friends ==
Kuntz is also the creator and owner of Pinchy & Friends, a Los Angeles based independent record label. Originally created as a website to host DJ mixes, the label now releases vinyl and digital streaming from artists such as Yu Su and Alex Kassian.

Kuntz, under his alias Pinchy Don, also hosts a live vinyl-only radio show on Dublab titled “In the Shade of the Palm.”

Discography

PF001 - Amaringo

PF002 - Ghost Vision

PF003 - JAZ Edits 1

PF004 - Milord

PF005 - Alex Kassian

PF006 - Alex Kassian "Strings of Eden"

PF007 - Danger Boys "Monsters from the Future"

PF008 - JAZ Edits 2

PF009 - Dreems "Dreems vs. Scientist"

PF010 - Ruf Dug "Thru the Night! I Love You?"

PF011 - Yu Su "I Want An Earth"

== Record cover art ==
Kuntz created the record cover art for electronic artist Dr. Dunks and Godsy for NYC record label Whateverwewant Records. The label is owned and run by Carlos Arias, who is also a film editor who has collaborated on numerous Kuntz-directed commercials and music videos.
