= Siberian Breaks =

Single by MGMT

from the album Congratulations
- Released: April 17, 2010
- Genre: Psychedelic rock; progressive rock; art rock
- Length: 12:09
- Label: Columbia
- Songwriters: Andrew VanWyngarden; Ben Goldwasser

MGMT singles chronology
"Flash Delirium" (2010)	"Siberian Breaks" (2010)	"It's Working" (2010)

"Siberian Breaks" is a song by the American rock band MGMT, released as the second single from their second studio album Congratulations (2010) as an exclusive release part of Record Store Day on April 17, 2010. It is the longest track on the album and MGMT's second longest song to date, clocking in a minute and a half behind "Metanoia." Andrew VanWyngarden has said that Siberian Breaks is his favorite song on the album.

== Background ==
The song was released as a limited-edition 12" blue marble vinyl single for Record Store Day 2010, featuring the full 12-minute album version of "Siberian Breaks" on side A, with side B featuring a special etched design. There were 2000 copies pressed and it has been said to be "the perfect companion piece to the album". VanWyngarden has said of the song, "It's kind of like eight different songs strung together into one, and the general theme is about surfing in the Arctic Circle by Russia."

== Charts ==
Chart (2018)	Peak position
UK Physical Sales Chart (Official Charts Company)	28

== Personnel ==
- Andrew VanWyngarden – vocals, guitar, bass, drums, harmonica, percussion, electric sitar, synthesizer, composer, lyricist
- Ben Goldwasser – synthesizer, numerology, samples, percussion, composer
- James Richardson – guitar, panpipes, percussion
- Matt Asti – guitar, bass, percussion
- Will Bermann – guitar, percussion
- Sonic Boom – producer, "first documented use of the EMT 250 reverb "glitch""
- Gillian Rivers – strings
- Dave Cadden – oboe, sundries
- Billy Bennett – engineer
- Matt Boynton – engineer
- Dave Fridmann – mixing engineer, engineer
- Daniel Johnson – assistant engineer
- Greg Calbi – mastering engineer
