= It's Working =

Single by MGMT

from the album Congratulations
- Released: June 26, 2010
- Genre: Psychedelic rock, psychedelic pop, progressive pop, art rock, surf rock, baroque pop
- Length: 4:07
- Label: Columbia
- Songwriters: Andrew VanWyngarden, Ben Goldwasser

MGMT singles chronology
| "Siberian Breaks" (2010) | "It's Working" (2010) | "Congratulations" (2010) |

Music video
- "It's Working" on YouTube

"It's Working" is the third single released from the album Congratulations by MGMT. The album covers were made by So Me.

Sonic Boom's commentary on the track, before the Congratulations sessions at the Blanker Unsinn Studio on 2010, is "Love? Or Confusion? Reality? Contusion? Subterranea or Sub-fusion. The Quest begins."

== History ==
The single was added to BBC Radio 1's C-Playlist in May 2010 and later upgraded to the B-Playlist.

On June 29, the single was released as a digital download on iTunes, with the name of "It's Working Digital 45" and contains the Air and Violens remix.

On June 30, the remix by Air was given as a free download on RCRD LBL.

== Music video ==
MGMT said in an interview for Pitchfork about the song, "We just shot the coolest video in Paris with director So Me [Justice's "D.A.N.C.E."] for 'It's Working'. In it, Ben and I find this box and these instructions to put together a machine that's constantly changing, and we end up losing control over it. Saying this now, it sounds so metaphorical for our musical career, which is really funny."

The video was premiered on June 15 on their website.

The video has Andrew VanWyngarden and Ben Goldwasser finding a box that contains a giant machine. They find a booklet with the title "Construction Manual" on it. They look through it and push different buttons on the machine. While VanWyngarden and Goldwasser push the buttons a woman walks past but they do not take any notice of her and the machine takes photos of her that MGMT show to a photo booth. While the song keeps playing, VanWyngarden and Goldwasser do various things with the machine such as pour ice cream all over a sombrero on Will Berman's head and locking Matthew Asti in with a giant gopher. Near the end of the video, the machine starts shrinking VanWyngarden tries looking for Goldwasser and finds him in bed with the woman from before as the song starts fading. He wakes Goldwasser up and try getting out of the machine. VanWyngarden, Richardson and Asti escape but VanWyngarden goes back for Goldwasser who gets stuck in the machine along with VanWyngarden. The video ends with the box closing itself and a man (played by the video's director, So Me), picking up the box.

== Track listing ==
Digital download
| No. | Title | Length |
|---|---|---|
| 1. | "It's Working" (Air remix) | 4:31 |
| 2. | "It's Working" (Violens remix) | 4:02 |

== Personnel ==
- Andrew VanWyngarden – vocals, guitar, bass guitar
- Ben Goldwasser – synthesizer and samples, omnichord
- James Richardson – guitar
- Matt Asti – guitar
- Will Berman – drums
- Britta Phillips – additional vocals
- Gillian Rivers – strings
