= Blue Lips (song) =

2019 single by Bear Hands

Single by Bear Hands

from the album Fake Tunes
- Released: January 3, 2019
- Genre: Experimental rock; indie rock; rap rock; jangle pop
- Length: 3:36
- Label: Spensive
- Songwriter(s): Ursula Rose; Val Loper; TJ Orscher; Dylan Rau

Bear Hands singles chronology
"Back Seat Driver (Spirit Guide)" (2018)	"Blue Lips" (2019)

"Blue Lips" is a single by American experimental rock band Bear Hands featuring backing vocals from Ursula Rose.

== Charts ==
Chart (2019)	Peak position
US Alternative Airplay (Billboard)	32
