= Flash Delirium =

2010 single by MGMT

Single by MGMT

from the album Congratulations
- Released: March 23, 2010
- Genre: Psychedelic rock; art rock; psychedelic pop; progressive rock; experimental rock
- Length: 4:16
- Label: Columbia
- Songwriters: Andrew VanWyngarden, Ben Goldwasser

MGMT singles chronology
"Pursuit of Happiness" (2009)	"Flash Delirium" (2010)	"Siberian Breaks" (2010)

Music video
- "MGMT – Flash Delirium" at YouTube

"Flash Delirium" is a song released by the American psychedelic rock band MGMT on their second album Congratulations. It was the first single to be released from the album and was originally referred to as a "taster" before the band abandoned their original plan to not release any singles from Congratulations in order to solidify its existence as a singular body of work. A free digital download of the song was given away on the band's official website. "Flash Delirium" was made available as a digital download from iTunes on March 24, 2010.

In the song, Andrew Vanwyngarden expresses his feelings towards social networking and directly references to a popular site with the line "stab your Facebook." He expands on this in an interview with online magazine Coup De Main stating his disgust at the distraction it causes from real life: "It's just this weird little world which is fueled by vanity and looking at pictures of yourself." The song is on the soundtrack for the 2010 video game FIFA 11.

== Reception ==
Many critics praised "Flash Delirium" for its adventurism and distinct clash of styles. Rolling Stone magazine said it "ultimately keeps building until it explodes into a rapturous harmony, breaking into full-out thrash in its waning seconds." Pitchfork said the song "features flutes, horns, and about seven different sections that reference doo-wop, old school rock'n'roll, electro balladry, Ariel Pink-style lo-fi, wall-of-Spector pop, and the Beatles at their most high. All in four minutes and sixteen seconds!" "Flash Delirium" was also described as a "psychedelic trip."

== Music video ==
The video for "Flash Delirium," directed by Andreas Nilsson, "lends a visual clue into the maelstrom and chaos of modern times." It premiered on MGMT's website on Tuesday, March 30, 2010. It shows the two lead members of the band (Andrew VanWyngarden and Ben Goldwasser) at a welcome-home party. Ben touches a bandage at his neck a few times, with Andrew pulling his arm away from it each time. However, at the party, Ben removes the bandage to reveal a hole in his throat. Out of this hole is pulled an eel, which is then shoved into a machine and presumably destroyed, though the eel is shown wiggling in the hole in a few brief shots. The house trembles and the guests of the party dance as the machine emits lights, violently shaking. The video ends with a picture from outside the house showing something exploding inside and a guttural sound as the camera moves. In the very beginning of the music video, there is a banner outside the car that reads, "Sue the spider" and "Sink the Welsh," a reference to the lyrics at the end of the song.

== Awards ==
Title	Award	Result
MuchMusic Video Awards	International Video of the Year – Group	Nominated
MTV Video Music Awards	Best Rock Video	Nominated

== Personnel ==
- Andrew VanWyngarden – vocals, guitar, drums, bass, synth flute
- Ben Goldwasser – synth and samples, organ, piano, additional vocals
- Matt Asti – guitar, bass
- Will Berman – drums, guitar, bass
- Jennifer Herrema – additional vocals

== Charts ==
Chart (2018)	Peak position
Billboard Japan Hot 100	81
Canadian Hot 100	87
UK Singles (Official Charts)	179
US Rock Digital Song Sales (Billboard)	23
