= Congratulations (MGMT song) =

Single by MGMT

from the album Congratulations
- Released: November 26, 2010
- Genre: Psychedelic folk; psychedelic pop; indie rock
- Length: 3:55
- Label: Columbia
- Songwriters: Andrew VanWyngarden; Ben Goldwasser
- Producers: MGMT; Sonic Boom

MGMT singles chronology
"It's Working" (2010)	"Congratulations" (2010)	"Alien Days" (2013)

Music video
- "MGMT - Congratulations" at YouTube

"Congratulations" is a song by the American rock band MGMT, released as the fourth and final single and the title track from their second studio album Congratulations (2010) on November 26, 2010. The single was released as a limited edition 7" vinyl record with a special 20-page illustrated booklet. On November 2, 2010, Record Store Day announced the limited edition 7" of the single as one of their Black Friday exclusives, containing the Erol Alkan rework of the song. A music video for the song was released on August 25, 2010. "Congratulations" was released to radio on September 28, 2010.

The song was featured during the credits of the 2010 Oscar-winning documentary Inside Job. American hip hop recording artist Kid Cudi, sampled the song for his third album Indicud (2013), on the song "Immortal".

== Music video ==
The video for "Congratulations" features the two lead members of MGMT, Andrew VanWyngarden and Ben Goldwasser, journeying through the desert with a strange four-legged creature that Stereogum described as a "sad-eyed Duck-dog-o-saurus". Throughout the video, the creature gradually falls apart, losing a leg and then its beak, each body part sinking into the sand. Stopping to rest, VanWyngarden attempts to comfort the creature. Nearing the end of the video, the creature loses its footing and tumbles down a large sand dune. The two pick up what is left of the creature, and as dusk settles in, they come upon a portal-like structure. Just before reaching the structure, the creature's head falls off and sinks into the sand. From the sand, a cluster of lights rises towards the sky, blending with the stars, and shimmering in sync to the music. The song ends with the two men gazing up to the sky and applauding.

The video was filmed at Dumont Dunes in California’s Mojave Desert, and was directed by Tom Kuntz and edited by Steve Gandolfi. The creature was created by Legacy Effects. Vance Hartwell, of Legacy, said: "The puppet was made of materials including foam latex and fibreglass. We had an actor inside. His legs fitted into the hind legs of the puppet and his head was at the base of the neck. With the heat of the desert and the wear and tear of the conditions, there was always someone with him, both to make sure he was ok and to hold up the puppet head."

== Track listing ==
7" vinyl^{[A]}
No.	Title	Length
1.	"Congratulations" (album version)	3:55
2.	"Congratulations" (Erol Alkan remix)	6:35

Notes

- A The remix on the 7" is 6:30 long and the remix as digital download is 4:03 long (radio edit version).

== Personnel ==
- Andrew VanWyngarden – vocals, guitar, drums, bass
- Ben Goldwasser – synths and samples, percussion
- Gillian Rivers – strings
