= Bear Hands =

American rock band

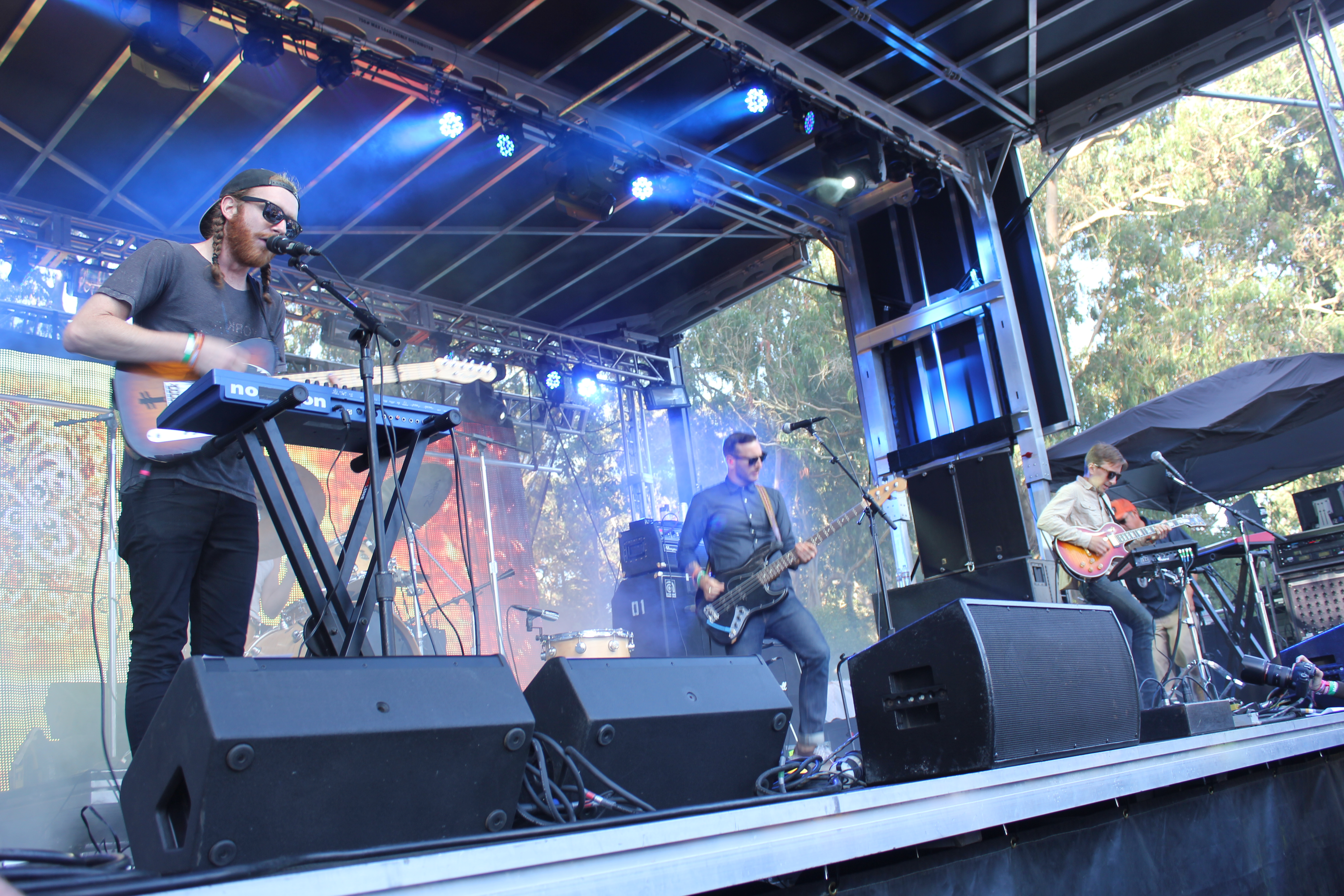
- Bear Hands performing in 2014

Background information
- Origin: Brooklyn, New York, United States
- Genres: Experimental rock, indie rock, post-punk
- Years active: 2006–present
- Labels: Spensive Sounds, Cantora, Warner Music, Freedom In Exile, Greedhead Music
- Members: Dylan Rau; Val Loper; TJ Orscher
- Past members: Ted Feldman

Bear Hands is an American post-punk and indie rock band, consisting of Dylan Rau (vocals and guitar), Val Loper (bass), and TJ Orscher (drums). Hailing from Brooklyn, New York, United States, and formed in 2006, with Ted Feldman (guitar) the band signed with Cantora Records in 2010 upon the release of its single "What a Drag".

After releasing their debut LP Burning Bush Supper Club in 2010, Bear Hands toured as the opening act for Passion Pit, GZA, and We Were Promised Jetpacks. Their single "Giants" became a top-ten hit on the Alternative Songs chart in mid-2014.

== History ==
Dylan Rau met Ted Feldman while the two attended Wesleyan University, and were later joined by Loper and Orscher through their previous band (In Pieces), who were involved in the local Connecticut ska & hardcore punk scene.

During an interview at SXSW 2010, Orscher was quoted saying "Dylan had some material he wanted to put with a band, and a project Val and I were working on for the last half decade just ended. He said he knew the perfect guitarist and when we met up and played for the first time, as cliche as it may be, everything just clicked. We started writing material together, fleshing songs out and started playing some local shows around NYC."

A few months after forming, the band released their first EP, Golden, and became a "New York buzz band" due to popular blog features. Three years later, the group released their 11-track album, Burning Bush Supper Club.

In 2019 they released the single "Blue Lips".

Bear Hands has an impressive history of live performances and notable appearances. On April 1, 2014, the band performed a live session at KEXP, showcasing their dynamic sound and energetic performance style. Later that year, on October 27, Bear Hands made an appearance on Conan.

Over the years, Bear Hands has played at some of the most renowned music festivals around the world. They performed at the Reading and Leeds Festivals in 2009, marking their entry into the international festival circuit. In 2014, the band played at several major festivals, including Coachella, Lollapalooza, and the Lowlands Festival, reaching a wide audience and gaining significant acclaim.

Bear Hands also has toured with Twenty One Pilots as the opening act for the Bandito Tour from May 12 to June 30, 2019.

In 2024, Bear Hands re-signed with Cantora Records. This newly reformed label, now under the umbrella of Rostrum Records, represents a new chapter for the band as they continue to create and perform music.

== Discography ==
=== Studio albums ===
- Burning Bush Supper Club (2010)
- Distraction (2014)
- You'll Pay for This (2016)
- Fake Tunes (2019)
- The Key to What (2024)
