= Congratulations (album) =

Studio album by MGMT
- Released: March 20, 2010 (stream)
- Recorded: February 2008 – January 2010
- Studios: Unspecified studios in High Falls, New York and Malibu, California; Vacation Island (Brooklyn, New York); Blanker Unsinn (Brooklyn, New York); Tarbox Road (Cassadaga, New York) (Note: Additional engineering)
- Genres: Indie rock; psychedelic rock; neo-psychedelia; progressive rock
- Length: 43:53
- Label: Columbia
- Producers: MGMT; Sonic Boom

MGMT chronology
Oracular Spectacular (2007)	Congratulations (2010)	Qu'est-ce que c'est la vie, chaton? (2010)

Singles from Congratulations
- 1. "Flash Delirium" Released: March 23, 2010; 2. "Siberian Breaks" Released: April 17, 2010; 3. "It's Working" Released: June 26, 2010; 4. "Congratulations" Released: November 26, 2010

Alternate cover
- Limited edition scratch-off cover

Congratulations is the second studio album by American band MGMT. It was initially made available for free streaming through the band's website on March 20, 2010, prior to its official release on April 13 through Columbia Records. The album marks a departure from the synth-pop style that brought MGMT acclaim on their debut, Oracular Spectacular, released three years prior, and features a more psychedelic, progressive and guitar-driven sound.

Most of the songs were written by the band in early 2009. They eventually headed to a Malibu studio to work on Congratulations, along with former Spacemen 3 member Peter Kember, known professionally as Sonic Boom. Vocal contributions from Royal Trux singer Jennifer Herrema were also recorded for the album. Andrew VanWyngarden has stated that the album is influenced by the band's massive rise in popularity since Oracular Spectacular's release. "It's us trying to deal with all the craziness that's been going on since our last album took off. Sometimes it just doesn't feel natural".

Congratulations debuted at number two on the US Billboard 200 with 66,000 copies sold in its first week, marking the best sales week for the band. As of June 2013, it had sold 219,000 copies in the United States. The album debuted at number four on the UK Albums Chart, selling 17,000 copies in its first week.

== Background ==
Speaking to Spin magazine on January 12, 2010, VanWyngarden declared that the album was finished, saying, "It's mixed and mastered, and now we're just working on presenting it to the world". On January 18, MGMT stated that they would prefer not to release any singles from the album.

In an interview with NME, Ben Goldwasser explained, "We'd rather people hear the whole album as an album and see what tracks jump out rather than the ones that get played on the radio – if anything gets played on the radio!" He also said, "There definitely isn't a 'Time to Pretend' or a 'Kids' on the album. We've been talking about ways to make sure people hear the album as an album in order and not just figure out what are the best three tracks, download those and not listen to the rest of it".

== Singles ==
Despite the band's pledge to not release singles, the album's lead single, "Flash Delirium", was made available as a free download on their website on March 9, 2010, before being generally released on March 23.

"Siberian Breaks", the second single, was released on April 17. "It's Working" was released on June 26 as the third single. The album's title track was also released as the fourth and final single from the album on November 26.

== Artwork ==
The cover art was designed by Anthony Ausgang, known for his kitschy lowbrow art style. The artwork depicts a stylized surfing cat about to get wiped out by a wave that looks like another cat. Commenting on the composition of the artwork, Ausgang stated that he tried to "use bright colors and get across ideas that are slightly dark."

== Release ==
Following an online leak, the band offered the album for free streaming on their official website on March 20, 2010, and stated that they "wanted to offer it as a free download but that didn't make sense to anyone but [them]".

Prior to its general release, a countdown appeared on the band's website on February 5, 2010, alongside a webcam image of a beach. The clock would eventually count down to 12:00 AM (EST) on April 13, when the album was officially released by Columbia Records.

The bonus track "Inbetween the Liners" consists of an instrumental outtake of a song called "Forest Elf" from the Congratulations sessions, with producer Peter Kember reading the album's liner notes out loud while the track plays backwards.

"Forest Elf" was eventually released on the live album 11•11•11, 12 years after the release of Congratulations.

== Critical reception ==
Professional ratings
Aggregate scores
Source	Rating
AnyDecentMusic?	6.5/10
Metacritic	72/100
Review scores
Source	Rating
AllMusic	4.5/5 stars
The A.V. Club	A−
Entertainment Weekly	B
The Guardian	3/5 stars
Mojo	5/5 stars
MSN Music (Consumer Guide)	C+
NME	6/10
Pitchfork	6.8/10
Rolling Stone	3/5 stars
Spin	8/10

Congratulations received generally positive reviews from music critics. The album holds a score of 72 out of 100 on the review aggregator website Metacritic based on 39 reviews, indicating "generally favorable reviews". Chicago Tribune critic Greg Kot called it an "impressive step up" from MGMT's debut Oracular Spectacular and wrote that the album sacrifices accessibility in favor of embracing "the duo's interests in waving the Barrett-era freak flag". Gregory Heaney of AllMusic felt that Congratulations "matches, if not triumphs over, their earlier work", concluding that while the band's "more dynamic approach to songwriting" results in a lack of obvious single choices, it nonetheless makes for "an all around better album." Celina Murphy of Hot Press felt that MGMT "have achieved what they set out to do and you have to admire them for risking their successful hides for a walk on the psychedelic side." Spin's Charles Aaron wrote that "despite being haunted by the group's flip from rock-star charade to reality, Congratulations still brims with mischievous energy. And for a series of druggy Dada setpieces, it feels uncommonly, emotionally honest." In Mojo, writer Shelby Powell noted the group's homage to British rock musicians Dan Treacy of Television Personalities and Brian Eno, complete with faux accents in MGMT's delivery on a few songs; Eno, who is the subject of one of the songs, described the work as "very flattering", and added: "I appreciate the way they managed to make the song both fond and tongue in cheek at the same time".

In a mixed assessment, Rolling Stone's Will Hermes adjudged Congratulations to be "a hazy, hit-and-miss album that will likely alienate some fans of the debut, but one that also testifies to MGMT's restlessness as songwriters and human beings." The Guardian critic Dave Simpson felt that much of Congratulations "isn't bad, just baffling", but that its eclectic nature "has produced a sonic adventure, with lovely moments", singling out the title track as proof that MGMT "haven't entirely forgotten how to write a killer tune." Scott Plagenhoef of Pitchfork deemed Congratulations "audacious, ambitious, and a little fried", writing that several songs contain "a surplus of ideas when a few good ones would have done... the less cluttered and more focused their tracks are, the better they turn out." Robert Christgau, in MSN Music, panned the album as "airy prog-psych self-indulgence" that elaborates on the less memorable portions of Oracular Spectacular, and that "even as self-indulgent elaborations go, the follow-up's a doozy."

== Track listing ==
All lyrics are written by Andrew VanWyngarden; all music is composed by VanWyngarden and Ben Goldwasser.

No.	Title	Length
1.	"It's Working"	4:05
2.	"Song for Dan Treacy"	4:09
3.	"Someone's Missing"	2:29
4.	"Flash Delirium"	4:15
5.	"I Found a Whistle"	3:40
6.	"Siberian Breaks"	12:09
7.	"Brian Eno"	4:31
8.	"Lady Dada's Nightmare"	4:31
9.	"Congratulations"	3:54
Total length:		43:53

iTunes Store pre-order bonus track
No.	Title	Length
10.	"Inbetween the Liners"	6:35

Japanese re-release bonus tracks
No.	Title	Length
10.	"Flash Delirium" (BBC Radio 1 Session)	4:16
11.	"Brian Eno" (BBC Radio 1 Session)	4:29
12.	"It's Working" (BBC Radio 1 Session)	4:10
13.	"It's Working" (Air Remix)	4:35
14.	"Brian Eno" (Cornelius Remix)	4:20
15.	"Flash Delirium" (music video)	4:23
16.	"It's Working" (music video)	4:09
Total length:		65:42

French edition bonus tracks
No.	Title	Length
10.	"Weekend Wars (Live at the Bataclan)"	5:09
11.	"Flash Delirium (Live at the Bataclan)"	4:48
12.	"Destrokk (Live at the Bataclan)"	4:41
13.	"Congratulations (Live at the Bataclan)"	4:27
14.	"Brian Eno (Live at the Bataclan)"	5:46
Total length:		68:25

== Personnel ==
Credits adapted from the liner notes of Congratulations.

=== MGMT ===
- Andrew VanWyngarden – vocals, guitars; drums (tracks 3–7, 9); bass (tracks 1–4, 6, 9); synths (tracks 2, 3, 6, 8); Casio guitar (track 7); piano (track 2); fake flute (track 4); harmonica (track 6); electric sitar (tracks 3, 6); percussion
- Ben Goldwasser – synths & samples (tracks 1, 3–9); organ (tracks 2, 4, 5, 7, 8); piano (tracks 4, 8); Omnichord (tracks 1, 2, 5); numerology (track 6); additional vocals (tracks 2, 4, 7); percussion

=== Additional musicians ===
- James Richardson – guitars (tracks 1, 2, 5–8; synths (track 2); Casio guitar (track 7); synth drums (track 8); glockenspiel (track 2); saxophone (track 5); panpipes (track 6); additional vocals (track 7); percussion
- Matt Asti – guitars (tracks 1, 4, 6); bass (tracks 4–7); piano (track 5); additional vocals (track 7); field recordings and treatments, percussion
- Will Berman – drums (tracks 1, 2, 4); guitars (tracks 4, 6); bass (track 4); additional vocals, additional synths, percussion
- Sonic Boom – master of ceremonies (unspecified tracks); modular synth (track 2); harmonica and percussion treatments (track 5); effects (Note: Jokingly referred to as the "first documented use of the EMT 250 reverb 'glitch'" in the album's liner notes.) (track 6); Gakken SX-150 (track 7)
- Britta Phillips – additional vocals (track 1)
- Jennifer Herrema – additional vocals (tracks 2, 4)
- Gillian Rivers – strings (tracks 1, 5, 6, 8, 9)
- Dave Kadden – Oboe, sundries (track 6)

=== Technical ===
- MGMT – production
- Sonic Boom – production
- Billy Bennett – engineering
- Matt Boynton – additional engineering
- Dave Fridmann – additional engineering, mixing
- Daniel Johnson – engineering assistance
- Greg Calbi – mastering

=== Artwork ===
- Josh Cheuse – art direction, design, photography
- Anthony Ausgang – cover painting
- A, B & C – collage

== Charts ==
=== Weekly charts ===
Chart (2010)	Peak position
Australian Albums (ARIA)	9
Austrian Albums (Ö3 Austria)	5
Belgian Albums (Ultratop Flanders)	6
Belgian Albums (Ultratop Wallonia)	12
Canadian Albums (Billboard)	4
Danish Albums (Hitlisten)	19
Dutch Albums (Album Top 100)	26
European Albums (Billboard)	2
Finnish Albums (Suomen virallinen lista)	24
French Albums (SNEP)	7
German Albums (Offizielle Top 100)	15
Greek International Albums (IFPI)	1
Irish Albums (IRMA)	5
Italian Albums (FIMI)	32
Mexican Albums (Top 100 Mexico)	57
New Zealand Albums (RMNZ)	14
Norwegian Albums (VG-lista)	20
Portuguese Albums (AFP)	18
Scottish Albums (Official Charts)	6
Spanish Albums (Promusicae)	36
Swedish Albums (Sverigetopplistan)	16
Swiss Albums (Schweizer Hitparade)	5
UK Albums (Official Charts)	4
US Billboard 200	2
US Top Alternative Albums (Billboard)	1
US Top Rock Albums (Billboard)	1

=== Year-end charts ===
Chart (2010)	Position
French Albums (SNEP)	142
US Top Alternative Albums (Billboard)	41

== Certifications ==
Region	Certification	Certified units/sales
United Kingdom (BPI)	Silver	60,000^{^}
^{^} Shipments figures based on certification alone.
