= Cantora Records =

American independent record label

- Founded: 2005
- Founder: Will Griggs, Jesse Israel, Nick Panama
- Genre: Indie rock, alternative rock, psychedelic pop
- Country of origin: U.S.
- Location: New York City

Cantora Records is a Brooklyn-based independent record label, most notable for signing the psychedelic pop band MGMT and issuing the band's first commercial release, Time to Pretend.

== History ==
Cantora Records was formed in 2005 by Jesse Israel and Will Griggs, then sophomores and roommates at NYU, and Nick Panama. Will Griggs is the son of former executive editor of The New York Times Jill Abramson. Prior to the creation of the label, Jesse Israel and Will Griggs approached Ben Goldwasser and Andrew VanWyngarden and offered to manage their band, then known as The Management. Nick Panama, having heard The Management's music through a mutual friend of the band, contacted Jesse Israel and Will Griggs and shortly thereafter the three music enthusiasts formed Cantora Records, each contributing $800 in starting capital. The Management changed their name to MGMT to avoid conflict with a U.K.-based band of the same name, and MGMT's Time to Pretend was issued under the Cantora Records name in order to coincide with their '05 tour with fellow psychedelic -pop band Of Montreal.

Since 2005, Cantora Records has expanded their roster to include artists such as Francis and the Lights, Bear Hands and Savoir Adore.

In 2015, Rostrum Records acquired Cantora's catalog with hopes to re-launch the label with new signings. That re-launch began in earnest in 2024 with the re-signing of Bear Hands.

== Cantora Creative ==
In 2010, Cantora Records launched Cantora Creative, a consulting division providing music-centric online video content and marketing strategies for various clients.

== Roster ==
- MGMT
- Francis and the Lights
- Emil & Friends
- Savoir Adore
- Bear Hands
- Zulu Pearls
- Rumspringa
- Gordon Voidwell
- Violens
- Rifle Men
- Slam Donahue
- The Echo-Friendly
- No Love For The Middle Child
- murdermart

== Discography ==
- MGMT - Time to Pretend (EP) (August 20, 2005)
- Violens - Tour Single (April 8, 2008)
- Savoir Adore - The Adventures of Mr. Pumpernickel and the Girl with Animals in Her Throat (May 6, 2008)
- Rumspringa - Rumspringa (June 3, 2008)
- Violens - Patrik Ervell SS09 Remixes (September 30, 2008)
- Francis and the Lights - LIME/WYN (CD: October 21, 2008, 7" February 5, 2009)
- Violens - Violens (March 17, 2009)
- Rumspringa - The Free EP (April 2, 2009)
- Savoir Adore - Machines (EP) (May 16, 2009)
- MGMT - Time to Pretend (EP) (Re-Mastered) (July 14, 2009)
- Savoir Adore - In The Wooded Forest (September 15, 2009)
- Bear Hands - What A Drag (February 16, 2010)
- Gordon Voidwell - Ivy League Circus (May 18, 2010)
- Francis and the Lights - It'll Be Better (July 20, 2010)
- Bear Hands - Burning Bush Supper Club (November 2, 2010)

== See also ==
- List of record labels
