= Andrew VanWyngarden =

American musician (born 1983)

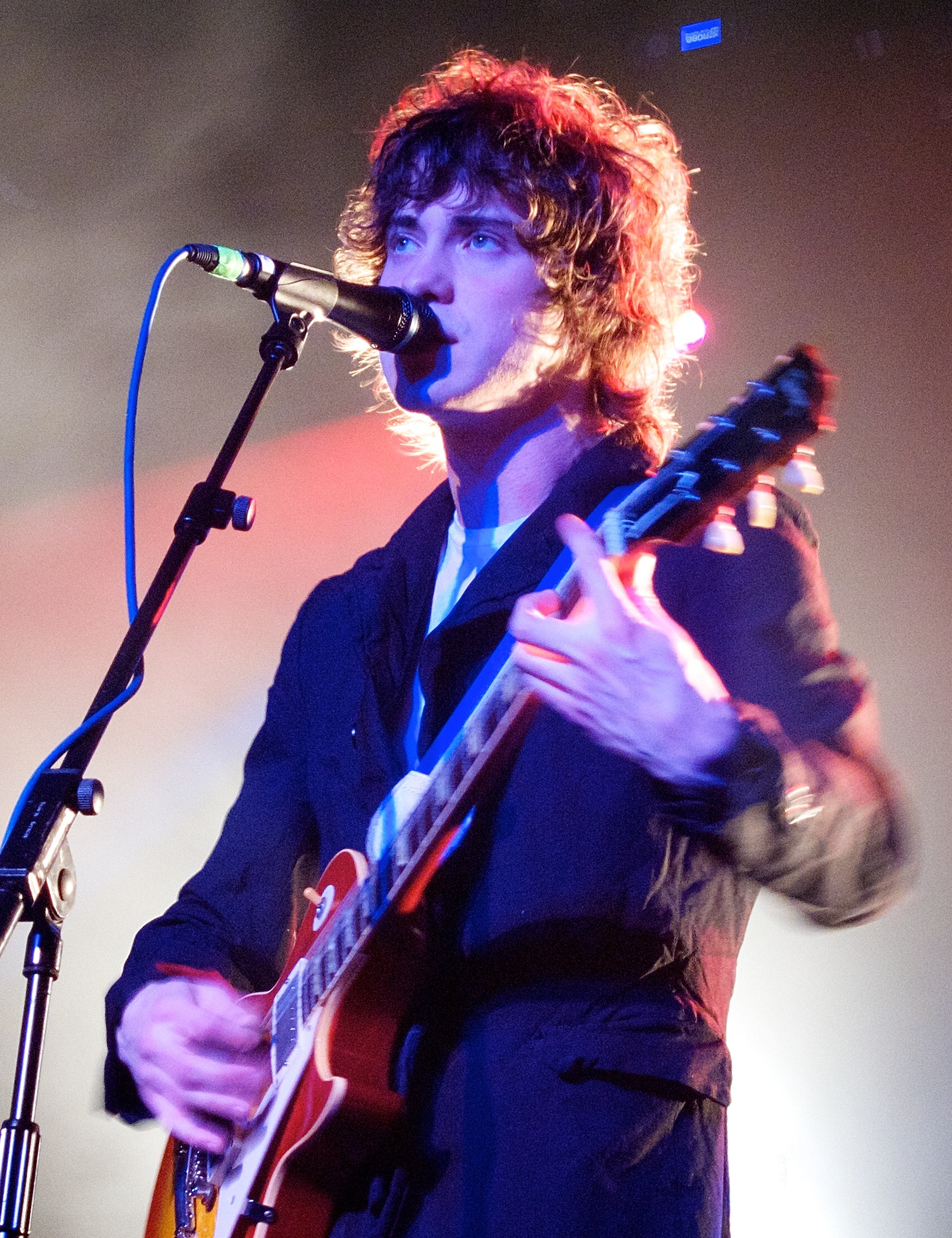
- VanWyngarden performing in 2010

Background information
- Also known as: Gentle Dom
- Born: Andrew Wells VanWyngarden; February 1, 1983 (age 43); Columbia, Missouri, U.S.
- Genres: Psychedelic rock; neo-psychedelia; indie pop; progressive rock; synth-pop
- Occupations: Singer; songwriter; musician
- Instruments: Vocals; guitar; keyboards; bass; drums
- Years active: 2002–present
- Labels: Columbia; Red Ink; Cantora Records; MGMT Records
- Member of: MGMT

Andrew Wells VanWyngarden (born February 1, 1983) is an American singer and musician who is the lead vocalist, guitarist, songwriter, and co-founder of the rock band MGMT. One of his songs, "Kids", received a nomination for the Grammy Award for Best Pop Performance by a Duo or Group with Vocals while the band was nominated in the Best New Artist category.

== Early life and education ==
VanWyngarden was born in Columbia, Missouri on February 1, 1983, and was raised in Memphis, Tennessee. His father, Bruce VanWyngarden, was the editor of the alternative newspaper Memphis Flyer.

One of his first experiences with music was listening to his father play The Who song "Pinball Wizard" on his electric guitar with a Fender Twin Reverb amp. In seventh grade, he received a Les Paul guitar and started playing. That same year, he won a contest at Lausanne School, playing "Under the Bridge" by the Red Hot Chili Peppers. He was influenced by the music he listened to with his sister, Nirvana and Ween in particular, and often went through his parents' record collection in the attic where he found Neil Young, Bob Dylan, The Rolling Stones, etc. "From then on, all he ever wanted for Christmas was musical instruments; future seasons saw a drum set, a banjo, and a mandolin."

While in high school, he formed a band with Dan Treharne called Glitter Penis, where it was the two of them playing around on the computer "just making songs," VanWyngarden says. They created and recorded parody songs but did not perform live. Later on, VanWyngarden was in a band called Accidental Mersh with future MGMT guitarist Hank Sullivant who would later introduce him to James Richardson, MGMT's future live guitarist. The band achieved local success and fame in and around the Memphis area, and released two albums: The self-titled Accidental Mersh and Mirror Israeli. The first album reached the #2 spot on Napster's "Unsigned Bands" chart. The band went on hiatus when most of its members went to college. Andrew invited Ben Goldwasser to play the keyboard for Mersh during the summer of 2002. The band had a weekly gig at Newby's, but the shows were sparsely attended and the band dissolved. In college, he wrote and performed a song called "Super Volcano" for a class.

VanWyngarden attended and graduated in music from Wesleyan University, where he met fellow band member Ben Goldwasser in his freshman year. VanWyngarden remembered his university years as something "almost sickeningly idyllic: lots of doing mushrooms in the woods, not a hard graft in the library."

== Career ==
=== MGMT ===
VanWyngarden came up with the title of MGMT's 2010 album Congratulations while making Oracular Spectacular. He writes a lot of the lyrics for MGMT, he has described the process, "I'd sit down for a few hours and try to do them. Usually, the ideas for the lyrics have been in my head for a while, and that's how I go over them again and again." His favorite song from the album is "Siberian Breaks". In a 2010 interview, speaking of fame and its effects on him, VanWyngarden conceded that to some extent he's turned into a kind of character he was poking fun at in the debut album. "I didn't realize it until now, but it's kind of funny, because the first song on our first album was 'Time to Pretend', which was about the imagined rock star scenario. So, [the song] 'It's Working' is like, "Yeah, we went out there and we did a lot of drugs, and it's not that great".

=== Side projects ===
VanWyngarden is in a project with Kevin Barnes from Of Montreal called Blikk Fang. In October 2014, it was announced that two songs would be released by Blikk Fang in Polyvinyl Records' 4 Track Singles Series for 2015. He appeared in The Heart is a Drum Machine, a documentary film about the nature of contemporary music.

In 2014, he released a solo track entitled "I Just Knew" for the surfing film Spirit of Akasha. He also released a cover of "I'm Alive", a song originally by Peter Howe.

In October 2020, VanWyngarden began hosting a radio show on WYXR called Time Passage.

VanWyngarden mentions Werner Herzog, David Lynch, and Federico Fellini as his favorite directors.

== Personal life ==
VanWyngarden is of partial Dutch descent. He has previously dated models Camille Rowe, Nasrin Leahy, and Andreea Diaconu. In a 2024 interview, he referenced being married. VanWyngarden also revealed in an interview he has a daughter. He resides in Rockaway Beach, Queens, New York.

In March 2020, VanWyngarden endorsed Senator Bernie Sanders' second presidential bid.

On November 30, 2020, VanWyngarden released the Fanta Se EP under the DJ name Gentle Dom. In January 2021, Gentle Dom released a remix of "All About You" by The Knocks featuring Foster the People.

== Discography ==
=== With MGMT ===
- Oracular Spectacular (2007)
- Congratulations (2010)
- MGMT (2013)
- Little Dark Age (2018)
- Loss of Life (2024)

=== Solo as Gentle Dom ===
- Fanta Se EP (2020)
