= Ben Goldwasser =

American musician (born 1982)

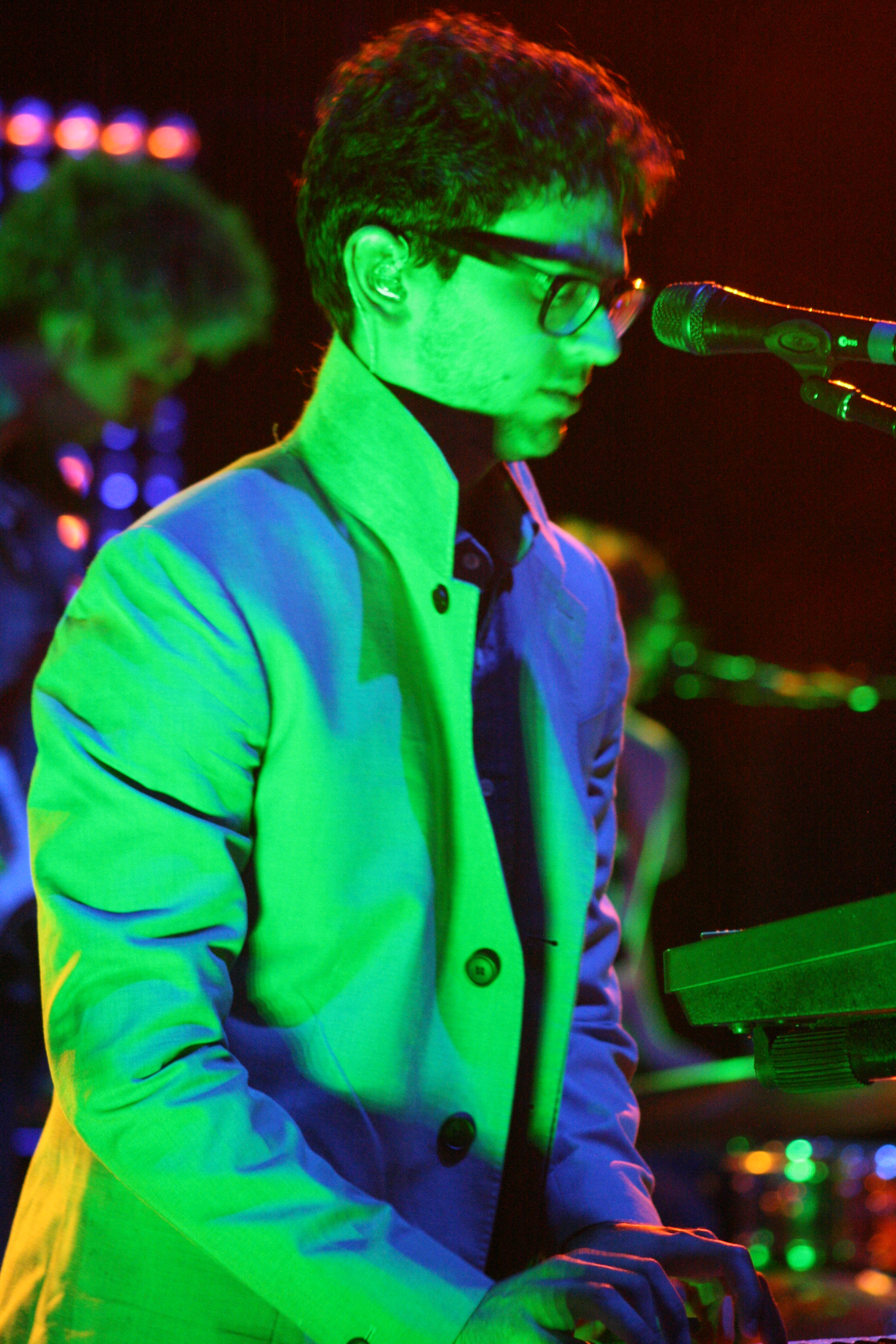
- Goldwasser performing in 2010

Background information
- Born: Benjamin Nicholas Hunter Goldwasser; December 17, 1982 (age 43); Mishawaka, Indiana, U.S.
- Origin: Westport, New York, U.S.
- Genres: Neo-psychedelia; new wave; synth-pop; art rock; alternative rock
- Occupations: Singer; musician; songwriter
- Instruments: Vocals; keyboards; sampler; guitar; percussion
- Years active: 2002–present
- Labels: Columbia; Red Ink; Cantora

Benjamin Nicholas Hunter Goldwasser (born December 17, 1982) is an American songwriter and musician who is the keyboardist, backup vocalist, and co-founder of the rock band MGMT. In 2009, his song "Electric Feel" (co-written with bandmate Andrew VanWyngarden), remixed by Justice, won a Grammy Award in the Grammy Award for Best Remixed Recording, Non-Classical category. In 2010, his band was nominated for a Grammy as Best New Artist and Grammy Award for Best Pop Performance by a Duo or Group with Vocals.

== Life and career ==
Goldwasser was born in Mishawaka, Indiana, the son of Rachel Hunter and David Goldwasser. He was raised in Westport, New York. Goldwasser is Jewish on his father's side. When he was age 11, he saw Adrian Belew live in concert and met guitarist Rob Fetters backstage. He began piano lessons with his grandmother and mother, played in his high school's jazz band, and attended a "rock and roll camp" in Montpelier, Vermont. One of his musical influences in high school was the electronic protopunk band Suicide.

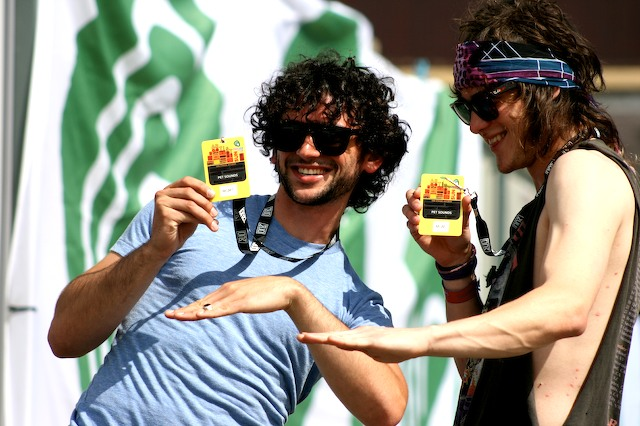
Goldwasser (left) in 2008 with bandmate Andrew VanWyngarden

=== MGMT: 2004–present ===
Goldwasser met Andrew VanWyngarden, the other half of MGMT, in his freshman year at Wesleyan University. Goldwasser was studying music at the time. While in college, he was a member of the Eclectic Society. He helped run the society's music venue located in a room in the house. Goldwasser, already a keyboardist, took experimental music classes from composer Ron Kuivila with VanWyngarden which exposed them to progressive musical ideas. They made their debut as MGMT at a party in a college dormitory (playing the theme to the movie Ghostbusters over and over for hours). The duo would email one another and sign the emails "The MGMT" as a way of satirizing corporate culture. They chose this email signature line as the name of their new band.

After graduating from college in 2005, Goldwasser and VanWyngarden moved to New York City, experimenting with music and building a band. They immediately went on tour, opening for Of Montreal. But no record deal came, and the band was on hiatus by 2006. Goldwasser began working on a farm and was intending to move to California when the duo was signed by Columbia Records. The band's 2008 release for the label, Oracular Spectacular, was a major success. However, the band's sudden success, Goldwasser says, put a serious strain on his friendship with VanWyngarden for a time. The band released its album Congratulations in April 2010 to generally positive reviews. Additionally, in 2013, they released their third studio album, self-titled MGMT. In 2014, Ben, along with psychedelic band Foxygen was featured on The Flaming Lips cover album With a Little Help from My Fwends on track 12. In 2021, Goldwasser and Karen O composed the music for the animated film Where Is Anne Frank.
