= Little Dark Age Tour =

2018–19 concert tour by MGMT

- Tour by MGMT
- Promotional poster for the second European leg of the 2018 tour
- Associated album: Little Dark Age
- Start date: 30 January 2018
- End date: 22 November 2019
- Legs: 12
- No. of shows: 101

The Little Dark Age Tour is a concert tour by American rock band MGMT, in support of their fourth studio album, Little Dark Age (2018). The tour began on January 30, 2018 in Berlin, Germany. The tour features several performances at music festivals, including NOS Alive, Splendour in the Grass, and Fuji Rock Festival.

== Set list ==
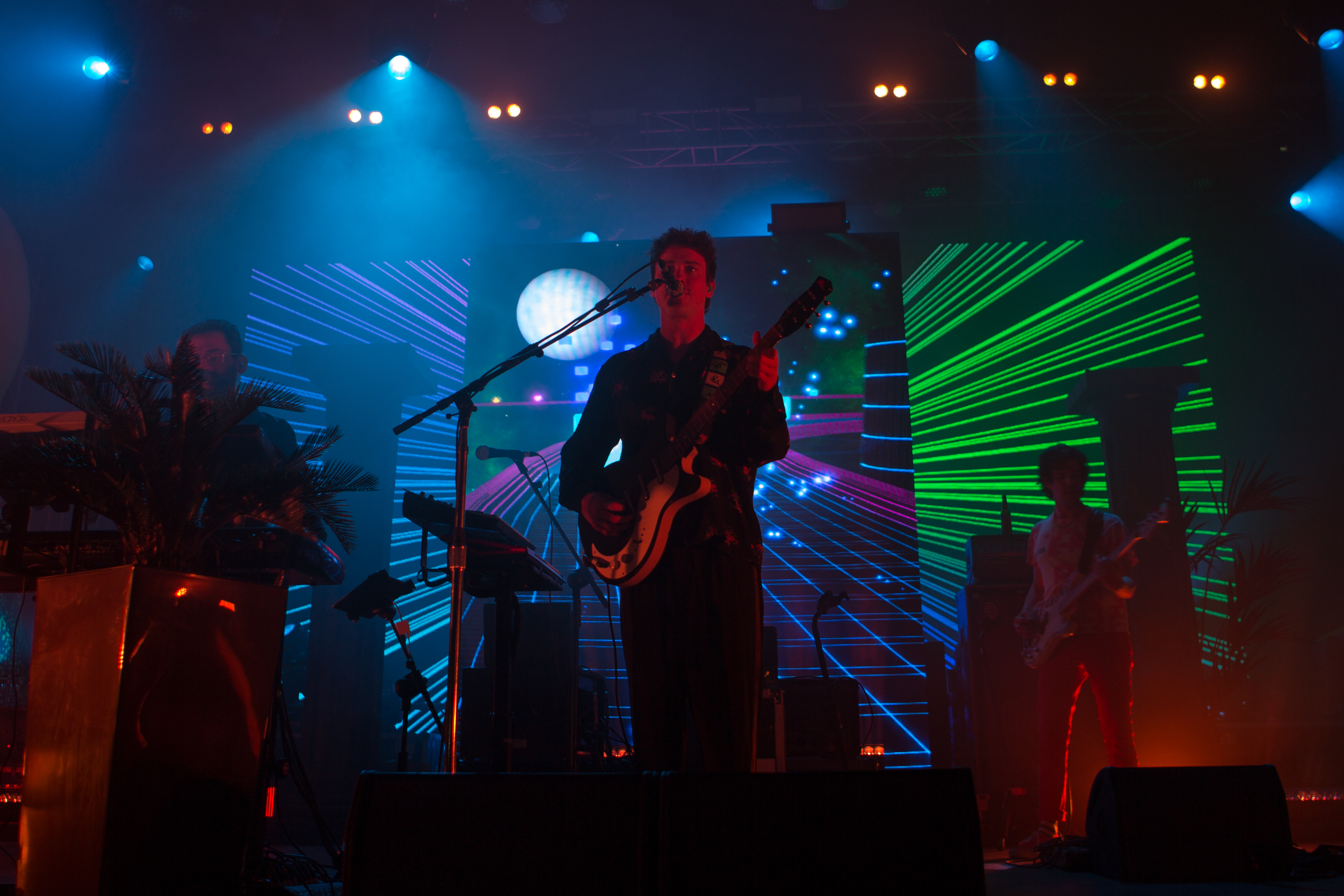
MGMT at Poble Espanyol in Barcelona, Spain on October 25, 2018

This set list is representative of the show on March 26, 2018, at Brooklyn Steel in Brooklyn, New York. It is not representative of all concerts for the duration of the tour.

1. "Little Dark Age"
2. "When You Die"
3. "Time to Pretend"
4. "She Works Out Too Much"
5. "Alien Days"
6. "When You're Small"
7. "Electric Feel"
8. "James"
9. "Weekend Wars"
10. "TSLAMP"
11. "Congratulations"
12. "Me and Michael"
13. "Kids"
14. "The NeverEnding Story" (Limahl cover)

- features a reprise of "Kids" at the end

Encore

15. "Flash Delirium"
16. "Hand It Over"
17. "Of Moons, Birds & Monsters"
18. "Brian Eno"

== Shows ==
Date	City	Country	Venue
Europe
January 30, 2018	Berlin	Germany	Huxleys Neue Welt
February 2, 2018	Amsterdam	Netherlands	Paradiso
February 3, 2018	Brussels	Belgium	Ancienne Belgique
February 5, 2018	Paris	France	La Cigale
February 6, 2018	London	England	Electric Brixton
North America
March 2, 2018	Maplewood	United States	Myth Live
March 3, 2018	Chicago	United States	Riviera Theatre
March 4, 2018	Chicago	United States	Riviera Theatre
March 5, 2018	St. Louis	United States	Peabody Opera House
March 7, 2018	Dallas	United States	South Side Ballroom
March 8, 2018	Austin	United States	ACL Live at the Moody Theater
March 9, 2018	New Orleans	United States	Mardi Gras World (Note: The show on March 9, 2018, in New Orleans at Mardi Gras World was part of BUKU Music + Art Project.)
March 11, 2018	Nashville	United States	Ryman Auditorium
March 12, 2018	Asheville	United States	Thomas Wolfe Auditorium
March 13, 2018	Atlanta	United States	Coca-Cola Roxy
March 15, 2018	Washington, D.C.	United States	The Anthem
March 16, 2018	Boston	United States	Orpheum Theatre
March 17, 2018	Montreal	Canada	MTELUS
March 19, 2018	Toronto	Canada	Massey Hall
March 20, 2018	Philadelphia	United States	Electric Factory
March 21, 2018	Richmond	United States	The National
March 24, 2018	New York City	United States	Kings Theatre
March 25, 2018	New York City	United States	Brooklyn Steel
March 26, 2018	New York City	United States	Brooklyn Steel
March 27, 2018	New York City	United States	Sony Hall
May 7, 2018	Denver	United States	Fillmore Auditorium
May 9, 2018	Calgary	Canada	Big Four Roadhouse
May 11, 2018	Vancouver	Canada	Orpheum
May 12, 2018	Seattle	United States	Showbox SoDo
May 13, 2018	Seattle	United States	Showbox SoDo
May 15, 2018	San Francisco	United States	The Warfield
May 16, 2018	Santa Ana	United States	The Observatory
May 17, 2018	Los Angeles	United States	Jimmy Kimmel Live!
May 18, 2018	Los Angeles	United States	Hollywood Palladium
May 19, 2018	San Diego	United States	Civic Theatre
May 20, 2018	Tempe	United States	Marquee Theatre
May 22, 2018	Salt Lake City	United States	Union Event Center
June 2, 2018	Santiago de Querétaro	Mexico	Antiguo Aeropuerto de Querétaro
June 17, 2018	Dover	United States	The Woodlands of Dover International Speedway (Note: The show on June 17, 2018, in Dover at The Woodlands of Dover International Speedway was part of Firefly Music Festival.)
Europe
June 29, 2018	Ewijk	Netherlands	Vakantiepark De Groene Heuvels (Note: The show on June 29, 2018, in Ewijk at Vakantiepark De Groene Heuvels was part of Down the Rabbit Hole.)
June 30, 2018	Luxembourg City	Luxembourg	Neimënster Abbey (Note: The show on June 30, 2018, in Luxembourg City at Neimënster Abbey was part of Siren's Call.)
July 2, 2018	Lyon	France	Ancient Theatre of Fourvière (Note: The show on July 2, 2018, in Lyon at the Ancient Theatre of Fourvière was part of Les Nuits de Fourvière.)
July 4, 2018	Paris	France	Philharmonie de Paris (Note: The show on July 4, 2018, in Paris at the Philharmonie de Paris was part of Days Off.)
July 6, 2018	Hérouville-Saint-Clair	France	Château de Beauregard (Note: The show on July 6, 2018, in Hérouville-Saint-Clair at the Château de Beauregard was part of Festival Beauregard.)
July 7, 2018	Werchter	Belgium	Festival Park Werchter (Note: The show on July 7, 2018, in Werchter at the Festival Park Werchter was part of Rock Werchter.)
July 9, 2018	London	England	Somerset House (Note: The show on July 9, 2018, in London at the Somerset House was part of the Somerset House Summer Series.)
July 11, 2018	Madrid	Spain	La Riviera
July 12, 2018	Madrid	Spain	Valdebebas-IFEMA (Note: The show on July 12, 2018, in Madrid at Valdebebas-IFEMA was part of Mad Cool Festival.)
July 14, 2018	Oeiras	Portugal	Passeio Marítimo de Algés (Note: The show on July 14, 2018, in Oeiras at the Passeio Marítimo de Algés was part of NOS Alive.)
July 17, 2018	Milan	Italy	Ippodromo del Galoppo di San Siro (Note: The show on July 17, 2018, in Milan at the Ippodromo del Galoppo di San Siro was part of the Milano Summer Festival.)
July 18, 2018	Nyon	Switzerland	Plaine de l'Asse (Note: The show on July 18, 2018, in Nyon at the Plaine de l'Asse was part of the Paléo Festival.)
Oceania
July 22, 2018	Yelgun	Australia	North Byron Parklands (Note: The show on July 22, 2018, in Yelgun at North Byron Parklands was part of Splendour in the Grass.)
July 24, 2018	Melbourne	Australia	Festival Hall
July 25, 2018	Sydney	Australia	Hordern Pavilion
Asia
July 28, 2018	Yuzawa	Japan	Naeba Ski Resort (Note: The show on July 28, 2018, in Yuzawa at Naeba Ski Resort was part of Fuji Rock Festival.)
Europe
October 25, 2018	Barcelona	Spain	Poble Espanyol
October 26, 2018	Murcia	Spain	Plaza de toros de La Condomina
October 27, 2018	Barakaldo	Spain	Bilbao Exhibition Centre (Note: The show on October 27, 2018, in Barakaldo at the Bilbao Exhibition Centre was part of BIME Live.)
South America
November 8, 2018	Lima	Peru	Park of the Exhibition (Note: The show on November 8, 2018, in Lima at the Park of the Exhibition was part of Veltrac Music Festival.)
November 10, 2018	Santiago	Chile	Espacio Broadway (Note: The show on November 10, 2018, in Santiago at Espacio Broadway was part of Primavera Fauna.)
November 11, 2018	Buenos Aires	Argentina	Club Ciudad de Buenos Aires (Note: The show on November 11, 2018, in Buenos Aires at the Club Ciudad de Buenos Aires was part of Personal Fest.)
November 13, 2018	Porto Alegre	Brazil	Auditório Araújo Vianna
November 14, 2018	Rio de Janeiro	Brazil	Circo Voador
November 15, 2018	São Paulo	Brazil	Latin America Memorial (Note: The show on November 15, 2018, in São Paulo at the Latin America Memorial was part of Popload Festival.)
North America
November 18, 2018	Mexico City	Mexico	Autódromo Hermanos Rodríguez (Note: The show on November 18, 2018, in Mexico City at the Autódromo Hermanos Rodríguez was part of Corona Capital.)
Europe
November 27, 2018	Bologna	Italy	Estragon
November 29, 2018	Zürich	Switzerland	X-TRA
November 30, 2018	Erlangen	Germany	E-Werk
December 1, 2018	Munich	Germany	BR-Funkhaus (Note: The show on December 1, 2018, in Munich at BR-Funkhaus was part of PULS Open Air.)
December 3, 2018	Hamburg	Germany	Docks
December 4, 2018	Copenhagen	Denmark	Vega
December 6, 2018	Sickla	Sweden	Nobelberget
December 7, 2018	Oslo	Norway	Sentrum Scene
December 9, 2018	Berlin	Germany	Columbiahalle
December 10, 2018	Utrecht	Netherlands	TivoliVredenburg Ronda
December 11, 2018	Antwerp	Belgium	De Roma
December 13, 2018	London	England	Eventim Apollo
December 15, 2018	Glasgow	Scotland	SWG3 Studio Warehouse
December 16, 2018	Leeds	England	O_{2} Academy Leeds
December 17, 2018	Manchester	England	Albert Hall
North America
May 2, 2019	Oakland	United States	Fox Theater
May 3, 2019	Long Beach	United States	Harry Bridges Memorial Park (Note: The two shows on May 3 and May 4, 2019, in Long Beach at the Harry Bridges Memorial Park are part of Just Like Heaven Fest.)
May 4, 2019	Long Beach	United States	Harry Bridges Memorial Park
May 5, 2019	Tucson	United States	Rialto Theatre
May 8, 2019	Oklahoma City	United States	The Criterion
May 9, 2019	Kansas City	United States	Uptown Theater
May 11, 2019	Cleveland	United States	Cleveland Masonic and Performing Arts Center
May 12, 2019	Columbus	United States	EXPRESS LIVE!
May 13, 2019	Detroit	United States	The Fillmore Detroit
May 15, 2019	Grand Rapids, Michigan	United States	20 Monroe Live
May 16, 2019	Pittsburgh	United States	Stage AE
May 17, 2019	New Haven	United States	College Street Music Hall
May 18, 2019	Sainte-Thérèse	Canada	Downtown Sainte-Thérèse (Note: The show on May 18, 2019, in Sainte-Thérèse at Downtown Sainte-Thérèse was part of Festival Santa Teresa.)
May 20, 2019	Port Chester	United States	Capitol Theatre
May 22, 2019	New York City	United States	Webster Hall
May 23, 2019	New York City	United States	Webster Hall
May 24, 2019	New York City	United States	Webster Hall
Asia
August 16, 2019	Chiba	Japan	Makuhari Messe (Note: The show on August 16, 2019, in Chiba at Makuhari Messe was part of Summer Sonic.)
August 18, 2019	Osaka	Japan	Maishima Sports Island (Note: The show on August 18, 2019, in Osaka at Maishima Sports Island was part of Summer Sonic.)
North America
November 21, 2019	Las Vegas	United States	Pearl Concert Theater
November 23, 2019	San Diego	United States	Embarcadero Marina Park North (Note: The show on November 22, 2019, in San Diego at Embarcadero Marina Park North is part of the Wonderfront Festival.)

=== Cancelled shows ===
Date	Location	Venue	Reason/Additional Info
July 1, 2018	Marmande, France	Garorock Festival	Cancelled due to extreme weather warnings and the threat of electrical storms.
May 7, 2019	Houston, Texas, U.S.	White Oak Music Hall	Cancelled due to rain. However, the band performed a DJ set.
