= Tintori =

Tintori is a surname. Notable people with the surname include:

- Gerardo dei Tintori (1134–1207), Italian Roman Catholic saint
- John Tintori, American film editor and director
- Karen Tintori (born 1948), American author
- Lilian Tintori (born 1978), Venezuelan athlete and human rights activist
- Ray Tintori, American short film and music video director
