= Weapons (soundtrack) =

2025 film soundtrack album

Weapons (Original Motion Picture Soundtrack)

Film score by Ryan Holladay, Hays Holladay and Zach Cregger
- Released: August 1, 2025
- Recorded: 2025
- Genre: Film score
- Length: 42:14
- Label: WaterTower

Ryan Holladay and Hays Holladay chronology
Class Action Park (2020)	Weapons (2025)	Roommates (2026)

Weapons (Original Motion Picture Soundtrack) is the film score soundtrack to the 2025 film Weapons directed by Zach Cregger. The film score is composed by the sibling-composer duo of Ryan and Hays Holladay, along with the director Cregger himself. The album was released through WaterTower Music on August 1, 2025.

== Development ==
In April 2025, it was announced that the siblings Ryan and Hays Holladay would compose the film score along with the director Zach Cregger, as well. They knew Cregger since childhood as they played together in a band called Sirhan Sirhan. Composing for the film began as soon as the editing commenced. As Cregger wanted the composers to be present during the post-production, this led the Holladays to relocate to New York and set up their scoring suite in the same office where the post-production took place, just steps away from the editing and VFX rooms. They worked on five months for the score, and as the post-production took place much early, the composition and editing happened simultaneously and during which Cregger made a visit to the composers' room, editing and VFX rooms back-and-forth. This led them to avoid any temp tracks to be used and allowed a "uniquely fluid, collaborative process", where the music was directly integrated into a picture resulting in a score which was organically built alongside the film.

Throughout the scoring process, the composers brought three suitcases full of synths, sound sculptures and samplers built everything just few steps down from the hall. While crafting the score, the team wanted it to feel intense and energetic, while also capturing "the mystery and the longing for answers that runs throughout the story without overstaying its welcome". In certain instances, they attempted on a cue for a few times to get the tone right. He recalled the cue "The Flight" which occurred in the big running scene where all the kids are headed. For that scene, the composers went ahead with a dramatic and sweeping score, but in the end, what connected to them was something reminiscent of Richard Wagner's "Ride of the Valkyries" and William Basinski's "Disintegration Loops" providing an unsettling effect.

== Release ==
The soundtrack to Weapons was released by WaterTower Music on August 1, 2025, consisting of 36 tracks.

== Reception ==
Tim Grierson of Screen International wrote "A rattling score, courtesy of Cregger and his co-composers Ryan Holladay and Hays Holladay, hints at an unseen horror". Filmtracks wrote "In the end, Weapons is a dismal score with no highlights." David Rooney of The Hollywood Reporter called it "a gut-churning score by brothers Ryan and Hays Holladay and Cregger that covers a wide tonal range while building an unsettling soundscape." Bhavna Agarwal of India Today wrote "the score by Ryan and Hays Holladay adds layers to the madness."

Ben of Soundtrack Universe wrote "Weapons is perhaps a score best experienced within its film first and then venture over to the album to extract specific cues that caught ones attention." Amber T. of Fangoria called it a "thumping, killer score from Ryan and Hays Holladay". Amy Nicholson of Los Angeles Times wrote "The retro needle-drops by George Harrison and Percy Sledge give the film its own style, as does the fantastic main musical theme (by Hays Holladay, Ryan Holladay and Cregger) that’s a harmony of harp, piano and rattling bones." Peter Debruge of Variety described it "a score that makes your bones vibrate".

== Track listing ==
No.	Title	Length
1.	"Maddie"	1:44
2.	"Main Theme (from "Weapons")"	1:59
3.	"Who's There?"	0:38
4.	"Following"	0:47
5.	"Newspaper"	1:25
6.	"Don't You Find It Odd?"	1:02
7.	"What Could've Happened"	0:56
8.	"Nightmares"	0:33
9.	"Snip"	1:21
10.	"Daybreak"	0:41
11.	"Troubled Person"	1:04
12.	"Where Are You?"	4:16
13.	"Map"	1:00
14.	"Waiting Game"	0:49
15.	"Gasoline"	1:11
16.	"Stop Right There"	0:51
17.	"Serious Hot Water"	1:01
18.	"Donna"	1:00
19.	"James"	1:13
20.	"Room to Room"	1:51
21.	"What Did I Tell You?"	0:50
22.	"On a Mission"	0:45
23.	"Drag"	0:30
24.	"I Think She Cut My Hair"	2:45
25.	"Gasoline II"	1:40
26.	"Homesickness"	1:57
27.	"Are You Watching?"	0:27
28.	"Campbell's"	1:47
29.	"If I Got Better"	1:37
30.	"Nametag"	1:07
31.	"The Flight"	3:42
32.	"Into the Lair"	2:12
33.	"One Shot"	0:57
34.	"Locked"	1:21
35.	"Swarm" (feat. Mary Lattimore)	1:32
36.	"I Found You"	2:32
Total length:		42:14

== Additional music ==
The opening sequence of the film features the song "Beware of Darkness" by George Harrison and the end credits feature the song "Under the Porch" by MGMT.

"The Dark End of the Street" by Dan Penn and Chips Moman is also used during the scenes where Justine and Paul meet up at the bar.

== Release history ==
Release history and formats for Weapons (Original Motion Picture Soundtrack)
Region	Date	Format(s)	Label(s)	Ref.
Various	August 1, 2025	Digital download; streaming	WaterTower Music	
Various	October 3, 2025	LP	Waxwork Records	
