= True Faith (band) =

Filipino alternative rock band

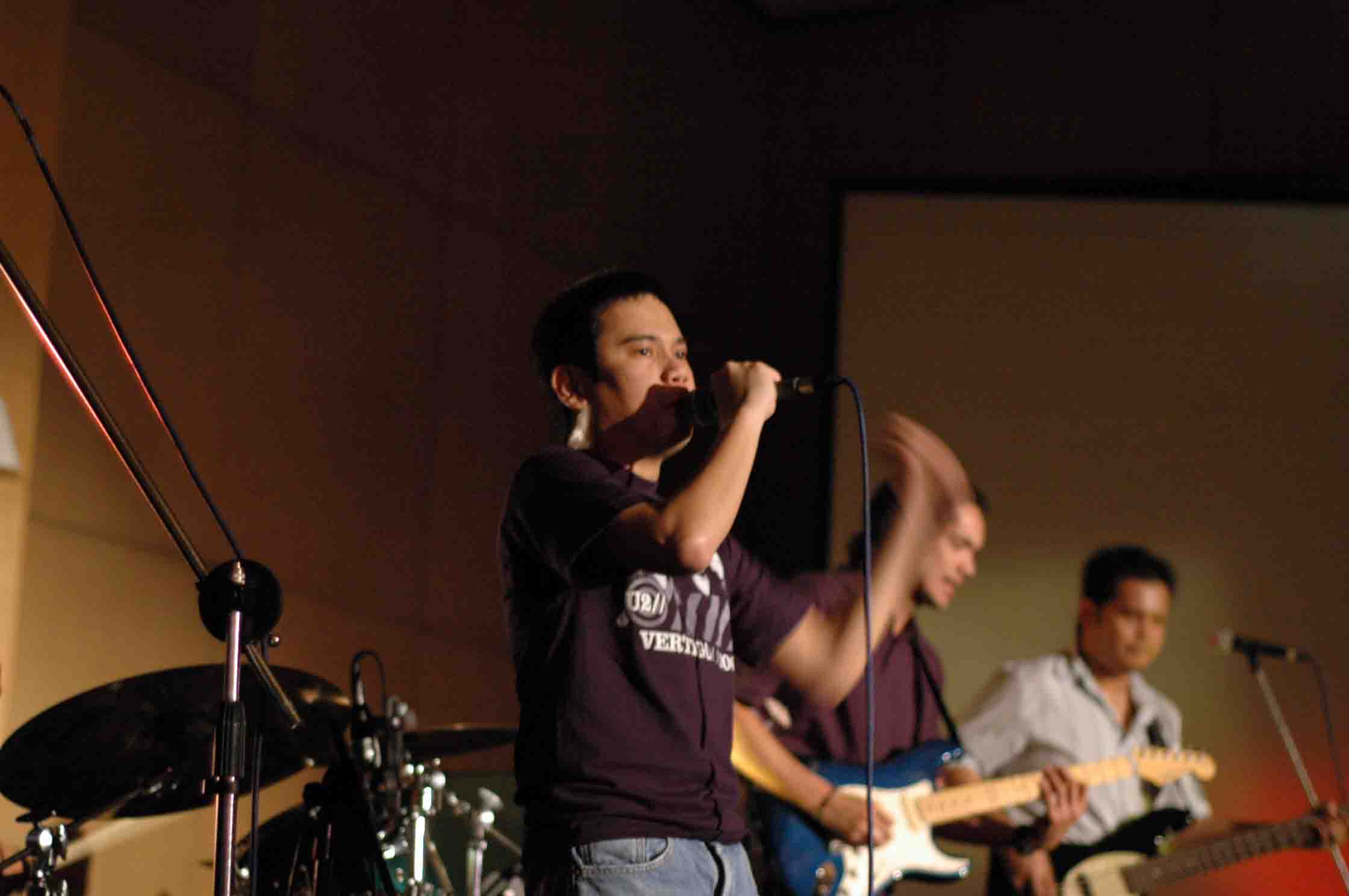

Background information
- Origin: Quezon City, Metro Manila, Philippines
- Genres: Pinoy rock; pop; alternative rock; pop rock; soft rock; OPM
- Years active: 1991–present
- Label: PolyEast Records (1993–2008); Viva Records (2009–2015); Star Music (2015–present)
- Members: Medwin Marfil; Eugene Marfil; Macky Macaventa; Allan Elgar; Jake Lumacad; Kaka Quisumbing
- Past members: Caryl Campos; Eazer Pastor; Ferdie Marquez (deceased); Francis Guevarra; Yeng Remulla; Jay Valencia; Jun Dizon; Carlo Sison; Kenneth Ilagan; Bimbo Yance; Benedict Esguerra
- Website: Truefaith's Facebook Fan Site

True Faith is a Filipino pop-rock band. The band was formed in 1991 by Medwin Marfil, Caryl Campos, Eazer Pastor, and Ferdie Marquez. The band is influenced by the new wave genre and took its name from New Order's 1987 single "True Faith."

== History ==
=== Early career ===
In 1993, a demo tape of the band's song "Perfect" hit number one on the Manila Top 40 radio station 99.5 RT FM (now 99.5 Play FM). After signing with the label EMI Music in the Philippines, True Faith's 1995 album Build was released as the group's major-label debut album.

The band received an MTV Asia Best Video Award in 2000 for the video for "Awit Para sa Kanya" ("Song For Her") from the album Memories Are Cheap: The Best of True Faith, 1993–2000, produced by True Faith and Darrell James Laxamana. The album featured a new track, "Kung O.K. Lang Sa'yo," an acoustic guitar ballad that included new member Jay Valencia. This album also included a remixed version of "Get It On."

At an MTV event in Makati in May 2001, the band performed with a three-piece horn section from Ugoy-ugoy.

=== 2002–2009 ===
Grace (2002), the band's next album, included the single "Dedma," and its music video featured FHM cover girl Diana Zubiri. In 2004, True Faith released Eto Hits...et Acoustic. EMI released a compilation of True Faith songs in their original arrangements, as well as newly reworked to suit the acoustic theme. This release also included a cover of the Culture Club song "Mistake No. 3."

After a two-year break from recording, the band released their eleventh album, Stray to Be Found. Benedict Esguerra and Kenneth Ilagan joined the band as drummer and guitarist, respectively, and the album included the first single they contributed to, "Dahil Ikaw." After "Dahil Ikaw," the singles "Sayang Ang Lahat," "Cross My Heart" (a cover of an EBTG's "Cross My Heart"), and "Araw't Gabi" were also released from the album. The videos for the singles appeared regularly on MYX's Daily Top 10. The album also included covers of Crowded House's "Four Seasons in One Day" and Fra Lippo Lippi' "Crazy Wisdom."

In October 2005, the band began their first American tour. From 2006 to 2008, True Faith performed shows in Taiwan, Hong Kong, Singapore, and Malaysia. In June 2009, Medwin and Eugene performed a special acoustic show in Dubai.

In 2006, the band released a greatest hits album and a music video, directed by Robert Quebral.

The music video for "Dahil Ikaw," directed by Genghis Jimenez was nominated for Favorite Mellow Video at the MYX Music Awards of 2007 and won in the Favorite Media Soundtrack category.

To celebrate True Faith's contribution to OPM and their years at EMI Philippines, the record label assembled a compilation album called Dream Journal: The Very Best of True Faith 1993–2007.

=== 2010s ===
Released in March 2010, Love Parade contained a mix of guests, including Luke Mejares; Dix Lucero; musician Carlos Magno of the band Out of Body Special, alongside Armi Millare of Up Dharma Down.

The band signed with Star Music (ABS-CBN Corporation's recording company) in 2015.

In 2017, True Faith received an invitation from MGMT to record their own rendition of the single "Me and Michael," which was eventually included on MGMT's fourth album, Little Dark Age, released on February 9, 2018. The result of this was True Faith's New Order-inspired Filipino version of the song, titled "Ako at si Michael." MGMT then released a music video of their song, which features True Faith in the narrative. True Faith also created a music video of "Ako at si Michael."

The band released their tenth album, Sentimental, in 2018 and reissued it on vinyl in 2021.

=== 2020s ===
In February 2022, the band released an album titled "11" consisting of three singles: "Dyahe," "Your Ready Smile," and "Refriend". The album's release was delayed due to the COVID-19 pandemic.

== Current members ==
- Medwin Marfil – lead vocals (1991–present)
- Eugene Marfil – acoustic guitar, vocals (1997–present)
- Jake Lumacad – keyboards (1999–present)
- Macky Macaventa – bass guitar (2009–present)
- Allan Elgar – lead guitar (2009–present)
- Kaka Quisumbing – drums (2011–present)

== Former members ==
- Caryl Campos (1991–1996)
- Eazer Pastor (1991–1996)
- Ferdie Marquez (deceased) (1991–1996)
- Francis Guevarra (1996–1999)
- Yeng Remulla (1996–1999)
- Jay Valencia (1996–2003)
- Joshua Rubia (1996–2003)
- Jun Dizon (1999–2003)
- Carlo Sison (1999–2003)
- Kenneth Ilagan (2003–2009)
- Bimbo Yance (2003–2009)
- Benedict Esguerra (2003–2014)
- Leo Barrite (2003–2014)

== Discography ==
=== Albums ===
- Perfect (1993)
- Beyond Doubt (1994)
- Build (1995)
- Looking Up (1997)
- Bliss (1998)
- Memories Are Cheap: The Best of Truefaith 1993–2000 (February 22, 2000) – Produced by Truefaith and Darrell James Laxamana
- Legalized Intense Vague Emotions (L.I.V.E.) (April 19, 2001)
- Truefaith Live: MYX-ed Emotions at Halo-Halo (November 23, 2001) – Produced by Darrell James Laxamana
- Grace (2002)
- Eto Hits...Acoustic (2004)
- Stray to Be Found (2006)
- Dream Journal: The Very Best of Truefaith 1993–2007 (2007)
- Love Parade (2010)
- Sentimental (2018)

=== Collaborations ===
- Make That Cool Thing Happen (Chiclets Promo Single, 1993)
- Pasko para sa Lahat: All Star Christmas Album (PolyEast Records, "Formerly Octoarts", 1996)
- Acoustic Lokal (Viva Records, 2003)
- Tunog Acoustic (Warner Music Philippines, 2003)
- Acoustic Natin (Universal Records, 2004)
- Acoustic Natin 2 (Universal Records, 2005)
- Pinoy Ako (Star Music, 2005)
- Pinoy Ako 2 (Star Music, 2006)
- Pinoy Biggie Hits Vol. 2 (Star Music, 2006)
- The Best of OPM Acoustic Songs (Universal Records, 2005)
- Superbands (Universal Records, 2005)
- Bandang Pinoy, Lasang Hotdog (Sony BMG Music Philippines, Repackaged 2006)
- Kami nAPO Muna Ulit (Universal Records, 2007)
- Toblerone National Thank You Day (2007)
- Unforgettable Kisses: Hershey's 100th. Anniversary (2007)
- Acoustic Best: All Original Artists (Ivory Music, 2010)
- A Perfectly Acoustic Experience (PolyEast Records, 2011)

=== Soundtracks ===
- Sana Maulit Muli: The Teleserye Soundtrack (Star Music, 2007)

=== Singles ===
- "Perfect"
- "Ambon"
- "Huwag Na Lang Kaya"
- "Muntik nang Maabot ang Langit"
- "Hi!"
- "Alaala"
- "Sa Puso Ko"
- "Baliw"
- "Awit Para (Sa Kanya)"
- "Kung O.K. Lang Sa'yo" (2000)
- "Sumasarap ang Gising"
- "Dedma"
- "Dahil Ikaw"
- "Sayang ang Lahat"
- "Araw't Gabi"
- "'Yun Lang"
- "Pangako"
- "Lihim"
- "Uwian Na"
- "Paano Ka Magiging Akin"

=== Cover songs ===
- "Ikaw ang Miss Universe ng Buhay Ko" (Original by Hot Dog Band)
- "Mistake Number 3" (Original by Culture Club)
- "Wala Nang Hahanapin Pa" (Original by Apo Hiking Society)
- "Cross My Heart" (Original by Everything but the Girl)
- "Different Seasons" (Original by Johnny Hates Jazz)

== Awards and nominations ==
Year	Award-giving body	Category	Nominated work	Results
1995	8th Awit Awards	Best Folk/Pop Recording	"Muntik Nang Maabot Ang Langit"	Won
1995	8th Awit Awards	Best Pop Recording	"Huwag Na Lang Kaya"	Won
1995	8th Awit Awards	Best Engineered Recording	"Boogie Manipon For (Huwag Na Lang Kaya)"	Won
2000	MTV Southeast Asia	International Viewer's Choice Award	"Awit Para Sa Kanya"	Nominated
2000	MTV Pilipinas Music Awards	Video of the Year	"Awit Para sa Kanya"	Won
2000	MTV Pilipinas Music Awards	Favorite Group Video	"Awit para sa Kanya"	Nominated
2001	14th Awit Awards	Best Performance by a Duo Or Group Recording Artist/s	"Kung O.K. Lang Sa'yo"	Won
2001	14th Awit Awards	Best Album Package	"Willie A. Monzon & True Faith for (Memories Are Cheap:The Best of True Faith)"	Won
2002	15th Awit Awards	Best Music Video	"Sumasarap ang Gising"	Won
2002	15th Awit Awards	Music Video Performance of the Year	"Sumasarap ang Gising"	Won
2002	15th Awit Awards	Music Video Director of the Year	"Robert Quebral for (Sumasarap ang Gising)"	Won
2002	15th Awit Awards	Best Folk/Pop Recording	"Sumasarap ang Gising"	Won
2002	MTV Pilipinas Music Award	Favorite Group Video	"Sumasarap ang Gising"	Nominated
2007	Myx Music Awards	Favorite Media Soundtrack	"Dahil Ikaw" – Sa Piling Mo OST	Won
2007	Myx Music Awards	Favorite Mellow Video	"Dahil Ikaw" – Sa Piling Mo OST	Nominated
2019	Star Music Awards for Music	Album of the Year	"Sentimental"	Nominated
