= Future Reflections =

Future Reflections may refer to:

- Future Reflections, a quarterly magazine published by National Federation of the Blind
- "Future Reflections", a song from the MGMT album Oracular Spectacular
