= Ray Tintori =

American video director (1983–2026)

- Born: October 30, 1983
- Died: November 10, 2026 (aged 43); New York City, U.S.
- Education: LaGuardia High School; Wesleyan University
- Occupations: Director; screenwriter
- Parents: John Tintori; Mary Cybulski

Ray Tintori (October 30, 1983 – November 10, 2026) was an American music video director and screenwriter. He was a founding member of Court 13, the filmmaking collective behind Beasts of the Southern Wild. Tintori directed three short films, as well as several music videos for bands, such as MGMT, Chairlift, The Cool Kids, The Killers, Arcade Fire, and Solange.

== Education and personal life ==
Ray Tintori was born in 1983. His father was John Tintori, a film editor and Chair of NYU's Kanbar Institute of Film & Television and his mother was Mary Cybulski, a script supervisor. Tintori attended LaGuardia High School, graduating in 2001. He graduated from Wesleyan University in 2006, where he studied film. Tintori lived in New York City. At the time of his death, Tintori was in a relationship with actress and comedian Heidi Gardner.

== Works ==
Tintori's first two short films were heavily-narrated, black-and-white fantasy stories featuring numerous whimsical characters. His directorial debut was the 2005 short film Jettison Your Loved Ones, which screened at the 2006 Slamdance Film Festival. New York magazine referred to the film as "a deranged, no-budget sci-fi epic [...] some of the most hypnotic and strange six minutes you'll ever spend staring at a computer screen." His senior thesis film Death to the Tinman premiered at the 2007 Sundance Film Festival where it won a short filmmaking award.

Tintori directed the music video for the MGMT's single "Time to Pretend". The video garnered attention on MTVu airwaves due to its colorful, psychedelic style. Tintori also directed the videos for MGMT's second and third singles, "Electric Feel" and "Kids", respectively. He also directed the videos for The Killers' song "Spaceman" and "Chairlift's "Evident Utensil", which was nominated for an award in the "Breakthrough Video" category at the 2009 MTV Video Music Awards.

In July 2009, Spike Jonze announced that Tintori would direct Light Boxes, an adaptation of the novel of the same name by Shane Jones. However, in May 2010, Jonze stated that Tintori was no longer working on the project, and in June 2010, Shane Jones said the film option had been dropped.

In May 2010, the Brooklyn Arts Council honored Tintori with a "premature retrospective", screening a number of his short films and other works.

He worked on Court 13's first feature film Beasts of the Southern Wild as Aurochs and Special Effects Unit Director.

Tintori participated in the Sundance Institute's 2013 June Screenwriters Lab with his Untitled Cabal Project, and his short film Cabal screened at the 2014 Borscht Film Festival.

He worked on Approaching the Unknown as Practical SFX Unit Director. Pre-production and filming of the effects sequences took place under the mentorship of Douglas Trumbull at Trumbull Studios in the Berkshire Mountains.

In 2016, Tintori directed a trailer video for Google's Tilt Brush.

In 2017, Tintori won a Sports Emmy for his work with Oculus on Follow My Lead: The Story of the 2016 NBA Finals starring Steph Curry, LeBron James and narrated by Michael B. Jordan.

In 2018, Tintori directed the ULP Orientation Video in the "Windmills" episode of Maniac.

In 2025, Tintori appeared on-screen as a cameraman in Marty Supreme.

== Death ==
On November 10, 2026, medical services found Tintori dead in his apartment after they had received a request for a wellness check. He was 43.

== Filmography ==
=== Music videos ===
- "Electric Feel" by MGMT (2007) (Interactive video)
- "Time to Pretend" by MGMT (2008)
- "Electric Feel" by MGMT (2008)
- "Delivery Man" by The Cool Kids (2008)
- "Spaceman" by The Killers (2009)
- "Evident Utensil" by Chairlift (2009)
- "Kids" by MGMT (2009)
- "Dressed to Digress" by Boy Crisis (2009)
- "Crystallize" (YouTube Music Awards version) by Lindsey Stirling (2013)
- "Chemistry" by Arcade Fire (2018)
- "Dancing in Babylon" by MGMT featuring Christine and the Queens (2024)

=== Short films ===
- Jettison Your Loved Ones (2005)
- Death to the Tinman (2006)
- Cabal (2014)
