= Mr. Wonderful (film) =

1993 film by Anthony Minghella

- Theatrical release poster
- Directed by: Anthony Minghella
- Written by: Amy Schor; Vicki Polon
- Produced by: Marianne Moloney
- Starring: Matt Dillon; Annabella Sciorra; Mary-Louise Parker; William Hurt
- Cinematography: Geoffrey Simpson
- Edited by: John Tintori
- Music by: Michael Gore
- Production companies: Night Life Inc. The Samuel Goldwyn Company
- Distributed by: Warner Bros.
- Release date: October 15, 1993
- Running time: 98 minutes
- Country: United States
- Language: English
- Budget: $13 million
- Box office: $3,125,424 (USA)

Mr. Wonderful is a 1993 American romantic comedy film directed by Anthony Minghella.

The film stars Matt Dillon, Annabella Sciorra, Mary-Louise Parker, William Hurt and Vincent D'Onofrio.

== Plot ==
Electrician Gus DeMarco gets the chance to fulfill a childhood dream by buying an old bowling-alley with some of his friends. Unfortunately, due to the alimony payments he has to make to his ex-wife Leonora, the bank refuses to loan him the down payment. Knowing that when she marries again she loses her alimony rights, Gus tries to speed things up by bringing Leonora together with all the potential husbands he can find.

Leonora has several would-be suitors, including one who upsets her because he is pushy, so she goes to complain to Gus about it. Afterwards, she has him to dinner. As he is leaving, her professor boyfriend Tom Gough shows up directly after, upsetting Gus. Gus knows Leonora can do better as Tom is married and just using Leonora.

In the course of his match-making, Gus' girlfriend, Rita Calley, breaks up with him on the day they were meant to move in together. She feels he's still in love with his ex.

Gus' workmate describes to him how being in love makes him feel. It inspires him to find Leonora but, seeing her in the botanical garden with her new suitor Dominic stops him from telling her that he still loves her.

On a job, Gus is badly shocked by electricity while saving a workmate. Leonora, similarly to him, realizes she still has feelings for him when she sees him in the hospital. Rita, as she works there, is at his side while he sleeps, so Leonora leaves without talking to him. Once he's discharged, she visits him at his apartment. She had broken up with Tom, and she lets him know that Dominic has asked her to marry him.

Gus sells his precious car to have the money to go into the bowling-alley business with his friends, whether he pays alimony or not.

In the end, Gus and Leonora discover that they still love each other and reunite.

== Cast ==
- Matt Dillon as Gus DeMarco
- Annabella Sciorra as Leonora DeMarco
- Mary-Louise Parker as Rita Calley
- William Hurt as Tom Gough
- Vincent D'Onofrio as Dominic
- David Barry Gray as Pope
- Dan Hedaya as Harvey
- Bruce Kirby as Dante
- Luis Guzmán as Juice
- Jessica Harper as Funny Face
- Joanna Merlin as Loretta
- Adam LeFevre as Kevin Klassic
- Peter Appel as Harry
- Paul Bates as Marlon
- Arabella Field as Patti
- Brooke Smith as Jan
- Bruce Altman as Mr. Wonderful
- James Gandolfini as Mike Crosby
- John Rothman as Ralph
- Vanessa Aspillaga as Marie, Dante's fiancée

== Reception ==
=== Critical reception ===
The film received mixed reviews. It holds a 53% rating on Rotten Tomatoes based on 19 reviews, with an average rating of 6.1/10. Audiences polled by CinemaScore gave the film an average grade of "B" on an A+ to F scale.

=== Box office ===
The film was not a box office success.
