= Chicago Cab =

Chicago Cab (or Hellcab)
- Directed by: Mary Cybulski; John Tintori
- Written by: Will Kern
- Produced by: Suzanne De Walt; Paul Dillon
- Starring: Paul Dillon; Michael Ironside; Laurie Metcalf; John C. Reilly; Gillian Anderson; John Cusack; Julianne Moore
- Cinematography: Hubert Taczanowski
- Edited by: Mary Cybulski; John Tintori
- Music by: Page Hamilton
- Production companies: Child's Will Productions; GFT Entertainment; New Crime Productions
- Distributed by: Castle Hill Productions
- Release dates: October 1997 (Chicago International Film Festival): September 18, 1998; (theatrical)
- Running time: 96 minutes
- Country: United States
- Language: English
- Box office: $23,946

Chicago Cab is a 1997 American drama film directed by Mary Cybulski and John Tintori. It is based on the play Hellcab by Will Kern.

== Synopsis ==
The film follows an unnamed taxi driver (played by Paul Dillon) over one day in Chicago, shortly before Christmas. More than 30 passengers enter his taxi throughout the course of the film, providing brief looks into their personal lives. Among the actors giving cameo appearances are Gillian Anderson, John Cusack, Laurie Metcalf, Julianne Moore, John C. Reilly, Michael Shannon, Michael Ironside, and Reggie Hayes.

== Cast ==
- Paul Dillon as Cab Driver
- Michael Ironside as Al
- Laurie Metcalf as Female Ad Executive
- John C. Reilly as Steve
- Gillian Anderson as South Side Girl
- John Cusack as Scary Man
- Julianne Moore as Distraught Woman
- Moira Harris as Religious Mother
- Darryl Theirse as X-hat
- Shanésia Davis-Williams as Lawyer
- Matt Roth as Male Ad Executive
- Ron Dean as Old Snack Trucker
- April Grace as Shalita
- Harry Lennix as Pissed Off Boyfriend
- Kevin J. O'Connor as South Side Guy
- Michael Shannon as Crack Head
- Shulie Cowen as Stoner Girl
- Andrew Rothenberg as Homer
- Tracy Letts as Sports Fan
- Hubert Taczanowski as Immigrant
- Tara Chocol as The Receptionist
- Reggie Hayes as Architect

== Release ==
Chicago Cab had its premiere at the Chicago International Film Festival in October 1997, where it was nominated for a Golden Hugo Award. It was not released in movie theatres until September 18, 1998, when it played in two venues and earned $23,946.

== Reception ==
On the review aggregator website Rotten Tomatoes, 56% of 9 critics' reviews are positive.

The film received criticism for having unrealistic taxi passengers, since all of the characters have an exciting story. Roger Ebert gave it three stars out of four, saying "Drama is always made of the emotional high points." Emanuel Levy gave a positive review: "A compassionate portrait of a lonely cabbie is at the center of the serio comedy ... [the passengers] highlight perceptively the funny, scary and dreary moments in a typical working day of a city cab driver."

== Home media ==
Chicago Cab was released on DVD on April 7, 2009.
