= Time to Pretend (EP) =

2005 EP by MGMT

EP by MGMT
- Released: August 30, 2005
- Genre: Indietronica; synthpop
- Length: 27:18
- Label: Cantora Records
- Producer: David Perlick Molinari

MGMT chronology
Climbing to New Lows (2005)	Time to Pretend (2005)	Oracular Spectacular (2007)

Professional ratings
Review scores
Source	Rating
Allmusic	3.5/5 stars

Time to Pretend is the second EP by the American rock band MGMT, released on August 30, 2005 by Cantora Records and made available on iTunes. New versions of the tracks "Time to Pretend" and "Kids" were later released on MGMT's debut album Oracular Spectacular (2007). At the time this was recorded they were still known as "The Management".

Will Griggs (member of the Cantora Records team) contacted David Perlick Molinari from French Horn Rebellion, for the production of this EP.

On October 1, 2015, MGMT announced on social media that the EP would be re-released on vinyl as part of Record Store Day on November 27, 2015.

== Track listing ==
All tracks are written by Andrew VanWyngarden and Ben Goldwasser.

No.	Title	Length
1.	"Time to Pretend"	4:29
2.	"Boogie Down"	3:33
3.	"Destrokk"	3:45
4.	"Love Always Remains"	5:38
5.	"Indie Rokkers"	4:24
6.	"Kids"	5:28
Total length:		27:18

== Quotes ==
"MGMT finally forayed with their first single, 'Time to Pretend' -- an understated anthem among inhabitants of Athens." – Julia Norman (Spin.com)
