= Stephanie Collie =

English costume designer (1963–2024)

- Born: 16 November 1963; Warrington, England
- Died: 26 October 2024 (aged 60); London, England
- Education: London College of Fashion
- Occupation: Costume designer
- Notable work: Lock, Stock and Two Smoking Barrels; Peaky Blinders
- Spouse: Hubert Taczanowski (m. 2007; died 2024)

Stephanie Elizabeth Collie (16 November 1963 – 26 October 2024) was an English costume designer, known for her work on the films Lock, Stock and Two Smoking Barrels (1998), Layer Cake (2004), London Has Fallen (2016), The Hitman's Bodyguard (2017), Angel Has Fallen (2019), Wrath of Man (2021), and Hitman's Wife's Bodyguard (2021), and the television series Peaky Blinders (2013) and My Lady Jane (2024).

== Biography ==
Collie was born in Warrington, Cheshire, England on 16 November 1963 to Scottish parents Peter and Elizabeth, the eldest of four daughters. She spent her early childhood in St Albans, Hertfordshire before the family relocated again to Cheltenham, Gloucestershire in 1972. Collie attended Pate's Grammar School. After completing a foundation year at Cheltenham Arts College, she went on to graduate from the London College of Fashion.

Collie married Hubert Taczanowski in January 2007. Taczanowski died of cancer in June 2024. Collie also died of cancer at St. Christopher's Hospice in London, England, on 26 October 2024, at the age of 60.
