= Kids (MGMT song) =

2008 single by MGMT

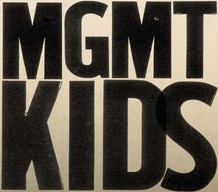

Single by MGMT

from the album Oracular Spectacular
- B-side: "Of Moons, Birds and Monsters" (remix)
- Released: October 13, 2008
- Genre: Synth-pop; electronic rock; indietronica
- Length: 5:02
- Label: Columbia
- Songwriters: Andrew VanWyngarden; Ben Goldwasser
- Producers: Dave Fridmann; MGMT

MGMT singles chronology
| "Metanoia" (2008) | "Kids" (2008) | "Pursuit of Happiness" (2010) |

Music video
- "Kids" on YouTube

"Kids" is a song by American rock band MGMT. It was released as the third and final single from their debut studio album Oracular Spectacular (2007) on October 13, 2008. The version of the song that appears on Oracular Spectacular is updated from earlier versions that appear on the band's extended plays (EPs) Time to Pretend (2005) and We (Don't) Care (2004). A track entitled "Kids (Afterschool Dance Megamix)" appears on the album Climbing to New Lows (2005). The earliest recorded performance of the song dates to 2003, when it was performed by Andrew VanWyngarden and Ben Goldwasser, then students, at Wesleyan University in 2003.

Following its release, "Kids" became a chart hit in several countries, peaking at number one in Norway, reaching number nine in Ireland, and entering the top 40 in six other nations. In the United States, it peaked at number 91 on the Billboard Hot 100 and number 17 on the Billboard Rock Songs chart. At the 52nd Grammy Awards, it was nominated for Best Pop Performance by a Duo or Group with Vocals. The song was the center of a legal dispute with the former president of France, Nicolas Sarkozy, over the "insulting" compensation he offered for his illegal use of the song during a party conference.

== Music videos ==
=== Student assignment video ===
A video made by University of Southern California student Jon Salmon was created in December 2007 as a student assignment and uploaded to YouTube the following month. The video features fellow students Abby Fuller and Rafael Pulido lip-syncing to the song and frequently cuts to various clips from other YouTube videos featuring people dancing. It has since been viewed more than 53 million times on YouTube as of February 2026. MGMT later invited the participants to join them for the official video of "Electric Feel".

=== Official video ===
On June 3, 2009, MGMT released the official music video for "Kids". It was directed by Ray Tintori, who directed MGMT's previous videos for "Time to Pretend" and "Electric Feel." The video was released to the Oracular Spectacular version. The animated sequence in it was animated by Christy Karacas, director of the Superjail! TV series, as well as Henry Thurlow and Lizzi Akana. The video was featured on the eighth-season premiere of Beavis and Butt-head: "Werewolves of Highland".

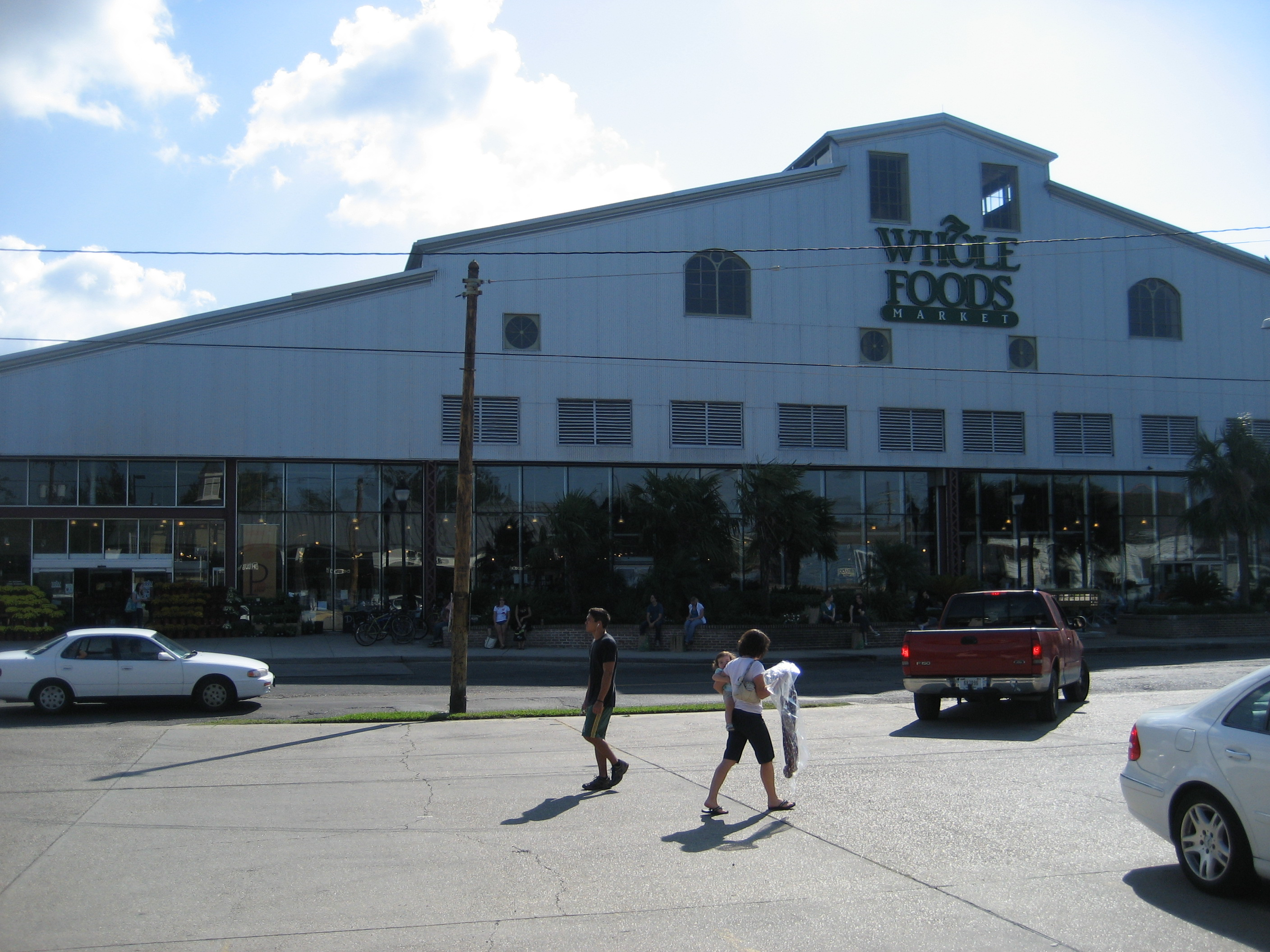
The video includes street scenes filmed on Magazine Street, Uptown New Orleans including in front of Whole Foods Market Arabella Station.

The video follows a toddler menaced by monsters that his inattentive mother (played by Joanna Newsom) cannot see. It was criticized for its treatment of the toddler, who appears to be genuinely traumatized throughout. Although the MGMT website states, "No children were harmed in the making of this video", Stereogum noted that the video "essentially polarized everyone old enough (but not too old) to know what the internet is". MTV noted that "They really don’t make videos like this any more … mostly for legal reasons". The band later released a "behind the scenes" video through their official YouTube channel, which shows the toddler mostly laughing while interacting with the puppets and actors in monster costumes, though crying at other moments.

==== False attribution ====
The music video opens with the following quote, misattributed to Mark Twain, which is in fact from Friedrich Nietzsche's Beyond Good and Evil:

He who fights with monsters might take care lest he thereby become a monster... and if you gaze for long into an abyss, the abyss also gazes into you.

== Reception ==
The single peaked at number nine on the US Billboard Rock Songs chart, where "Time to Pretend" had previously peaked at number 23. NME named it the number-one song on its list of the Best Singles of 2008. In October 2011, NME placed it at number 99 on its list "150 Best Tracks of the Past 15 Years". Rolling Stone named it number 46 on its list of 100 Best Songs of the 2000s. Rolling Stone's Kevin O'Donnell described the song as, "a noisy New Order-style synth jam."

On January 16, 2009, the song peaked at number 16. "Kids" came in at number five on Australia's Triple J Hottest 100 countdown for 2008. In 2013, the song was voted at number 64 on the same station's Hottest 100 from the past 20 years.

The single received considerable airplay in the United States, United Kingdom, Ireland, and Australia before the release date, charting in the UK, Ireland and Australia. In Australia, "Kids" debuted before the release date at number 89, and it peaked at number 30, playing on radio stations like Nova. A Soulwax remix of the song was played heavily on UK radio ahead its official release as well. The song topped Norway's VG-lista chart based on downloads alone. This made some controversy about how reliable the chart was, as the song had not been playlisted on any major radio stations and it disappeared from the chart the next week.

== Legal proceedings ==
MGMT was involved in a legal dispute with the former president of France Nicolas Sarkozy. Sarkozy's UMP party used the song on several occasions, before offering the band a €1 gesture. The band commented, "We believe that access to music benefits both the musicians and the fans, and has undoubtedly helped spread our music around the globe, while also expanding our personal musical collections", and that the reason they felt compelled to sue was because "the fact that the UMP used our song without permission while simultaneously pushing anti-piracy legislation seemed a little wack". Eventually, UMP reached an agreement on a €30,000 (US$38,000) settlement fee.

== Cover versions and samples ==
An acoustic version of "Kids" was recorded by the Kooks in August 2008, to appear on the next volume of Triple J's cover compilation Like a Version, which would later make No. 100 on Triple J's Hottest 100 of Like a Version in 2023.

In 2026, "Kids" was sampled in the song, "Dramatic Girl" by American rapper Baby Keem from his album Ca$ino.

== Track listings ==
CD single
| No. | Title | Length |
|---|---|---|
| 1. | "Kids" | 5:06 |
| 2. | "Kids" (Soulwax remix) | 5:42 |
| 3. | "Of Moons, Birds and Monsters" (Holy Ghost! remix) | 6:16 |

12-inch single
| No. | Title | Length |
|---|---|---|
| 1. | "Kids" | 5:06 |
| 2. | "Kids" (Soulwax remix) | 5:42 |

== Charts ==
=== Weekly charts ===
| Chart (2008–2011) | Peak position |
|---|---|
| Australia (ARIA) | 21 |
| Austria (Ö3 Austria Top 40) | 43 |
| Belgium (Ultratop 50 Flanders) | 19 |
| Belgium (Ultratop 50 Wallonia) | 32 |
| Canada Hot 100 (Billboard) | 42 |
| Canada Rock (Billboard) | 14 |
| Denmark (Tracklisten) | 33 |
| European Hot 100 Singles (Billboard) | 42 |
| France (SNEP) | 27 |
| Germany (GfK) | 48 |
| Ireland (IRMA) | 9 |
| New Zealand (Recorded Music NZ) | 29 |
| Norway (VG-lista) | 1 |
| Scottish Singles Sales (Official Charts) | 19 |
| Switzerland (Schweizer Hitparade) | 43 |
| UK Singles (Official Charts) | 16 |
| US Billboard Hot 100 | 91 |
| US Hot Rock & Alternative Songs (Billboard) | 17 |

| Chart (2025) | Peak position |
|---|---|
| Russia Streaming (TopHit) | 99 |

=== Year-end charts ===
| Chart (2008) | Position |
|---|---|
| Australia (ARIA) | 98 |
| UK Singles (OCC) | 136 |

| Chart (2009) | Position |
|---|---|
| Belgium (Ultratop 50 Flanders) | 92 |
| UK Singles (OCC) | 99 |
| US Rock Songs (Billboard) | 19 |

== Certifications ==
| Region | Certification | Certified units/sales |
|---|---|---|
| Australia (ARIA) | Platinum | 70,000^{^} |
| Canada (Music Canada) | 3× Platinum | 240,000^{‡} |
| Denmark (IFPI Danmark) | Platinum | 90,000^{‡} |
| Germany (BVMI) | 3× Gold | 450,000^{‡} |
| Italy (FIMI) | Gold | 25,000^{‡} |
| New Zealand (RMNZ) | 4× Platinum | 120,000^{‡} |
| Spain (Promusicae) | Platinum | 60,000^{‡} |
| United Kingdom (BPI) | 3× Platinum | 1,800,000^{‡} |
| United States (RIAA) | 5× Platinum | 5,000,000^{‡} |
^{^} Shipments figures based on certification alone.^{‡} Sales+streaming figures based on certification alone.
