= Mary Cybulski =

American script supervisor and still photographer (1954/1955–2025)

- Born: April 6, 1955
- Died: November 8, 2025 (aged 70)
- Occupations: Script supervisor, still photographer

Mary Cybulski (April 6, 1955 – November 8, 2025) was an American script supervisor and still photographer. Active from the 1980s, she was a script supervisor to the successful films Eternal Sunshine of the Spotless Mind (2004), Syriana (2005), Michael Clayton (2007), and Life of Pi (2012). She also co-directed and co-edited the 1997 film Chicago Cab with her husband, John Tintori.

Her son, Ray Tintori, was also in the film industry. Cybulski died from glioblastoma multiforme on November 8, 2025, at the age of 70.

She was recognized at the 98th Academy Awards for her work as a script supervisor and photographer.

== Filmography ==
- 1988: Anna
- 1989: True Love (title designer)
- 1990: The Grifters
- 1991: Little Man Tate
- 1991: Dogfight
- 1993: Mad Dog and Glory
- 1995: Roommates
- 1995: To Wong Foo, Thanks for Everything! Julie Newmar
- 1996: Lone Star
- 1996: The Crucible
- 1997: Chicago Cab (as director and editor)
- 1997: The Ice Storm
- 1997: The Spanish Prisoner
- 1997: Firehouse (TV Movie)
- 1998: The Gingerbread Man
- 1998: The Hi-Lo Country
- 2000: State and Main
- 2001: Heist
- 2002: Sunshine State
- 2002: People I Know
- 2002: Maid in Manhattan
- 2003: In the Cut
- 2004: Spartan
- 2004: Eternal Sunshine of the Spotless Mind
- 2004: Silver City
- 2004: Kinsey
- 2005: Bee Season
- 2005: Syriana
- 2006: Lady in the Water
- 2007: Michael Clayton
- 2007: Berlin (Documentary)
- 2007: The Brave One
- 2008: Be Kind Rewind
- 2008: New Amsterdam (TV Series)
- 2008: Synecdoche, New York
- 2008: The Happening
- 2009: Duplicity
- 2009: Taking Woodstock
- 2010: The Last Airbender
- 2010: Eat Pray Love
- 2010: The Tempest
- 2011: Arthur
- 2012: Life of Pi
