= Metanoia (song) =

Single by MGMT
- A-side: "Time to Pretend"
- Released: August 18, 2008
- Genre: Noise pop, psychedelic rock, synth-pop, progressive rock
- Length: 13:49
- Label: Columbia
- Songwriters: Andrew VanWyngarden, Ben Goldwasser
- Producers: Dave Fridmann & MGMT

MGMT singles chronology
"Electric Feel" (2008)	"Metanoia" (2008)	"Kids" (2008)

"Metanoia" is the special limited-edition single release that was originally a B-side on MGMT's debut CD single "Time to Pretend". It was released August 18, 2008, available in 10" etched vinyl.

"Metanoia" was named "Song of the Day" on September 16, 2008, by Rolling Stone, describing it as a "14-minute opus, which ranges from Donovan-ish acid ballads to interstellar synth-powered dirges to falsetto-laden theater rock."

== Track listing ==
"10 Vinyl EP/Digital Download
No.	Title	Length
1.	"Metanoia"	13:49

== Charts ==
"Metanoia" peaked at #2 on Billboard's Hot Singles Sales chart in September 2008.
