= Hubert Taczanowski =

British and American cinematographer (1960–2024)

- Born: 1 October 1960; Warsaw, Mazowieckie, Poland
- Died: 4 June 2024 (aged 63)
- Occupation: Cinematographer
- Notable work: The Opposite of Sex; Spooks: The Greater Good; River
- Spouse: Stephanie Collie (m. 2007; died 2024)

Hubert Taczanowski (1 October 1960 – 4 June 2024) was a Polish-born British and American cinematographer.

== Biography ==
Hubert Taczanowski was born on 1 October 1960. He was the son of Stanisław and Mirosława (née Sadżak) Taczanowski, and a member of the former magnate family Taczanowski from Poznań.

He graduated with Cinematography at the famed Łódź Film School in Poland. Taczanowski was the director of photography on nineteen feature films and two television series. His films screened at the Sundance, Venice, Toronto, Edinburgh and Berlin Film Festivals. Additionally, he shot over twenty music videos for Sony Music, Atlantic Records, EMI and Chrysalis.

In January 2007, he married British costume designer Stephanie Collie. He resided in New York and London. Taczanowski died on 4 June 2024, at the age of 63. Collie would die five months later on October 26, 2024.

== Filmography ==
=== Cinematographer ===
- Love, Wedding, Repeat (2020)
- How to Build a Girl (2019)
- Military Wives (2019)
- London Town (2016)
- Spooks: The Greater Good (2015)
- The Face of an Angel (2014)
- The Look of Love (2013)
- National Lampoon's Bag Boy (2007)
- D-War (2007)
- Van Wilder 2: The Rise of Taj (2006)
- Wild Things: Diamonds in the Rough a.k.a. Wild Things 3 (2005)
- Hotel Infinity (2004)
- Deathwatch (2002)
- My Little Eye (2002)
- Tadpole (2002)
- Home Movie (2001)
- How to Kill Your Neighbor's Dog (2000)
- Turn It Up (2000)
- Buddy Boy (1999)
- Break Up (1998)
- The Opposite of Sex (1998)
- Chicago Cab a.k.a. Hellcab (1997)
- The Maker (1997)
- Eden (1996)
- Last Exit to Earth (1996)
- The Young Poisoner's Handbook a.k.a. Das Handbuch des jungen Giftmischers (1995)
