= Little Dark Age =

2018 studio album by MGMT

Studio album by MGMT
- Released: February 9, 2018
- Recorded: September 2016 – May 2017
- Studios: Baby Office (Los Angeles, California); Kingsize Soundlabs (Los Angeles, California); The CRC (Brooklyn, New York); Tarbox Road (Cassadaga, New York)
- Genres: Synth-pop; electropop; psychedelic pop
- Length: 43:58
- Label: Columbia
- Producers: MGMT; Patrick Wimberly; Dave Fridmann

MGMT chronology
MGMT (2013)	Little Dark Age (2018)	11•11•11 (2022)

Singles from Little Dark Age
- 1. "Little Dark Age" Released: October 17, 2017; 2. "When You Die" Released: December 12, 2017; 3. "Hand It Over" Released: January 5, 2018; 4. "Me and Michael" Released: February 7, 2018

Little Dark Age (abbreviated as LDA) is the fourth studio album by the American rock band MGMT, released on February 9, 2018, through Columbia Records. It was the band's first album of new material in over four years, after the release of their eponymous third studio album in September 2013.

After the band concluded touring at the end of 2014, members Andrew VanWyngarden and Ben Goldwasser took time off for most of 2015 before regrouping at the end of the year. The album was produced by the band with Patrick Wimberly and longtime collaborator Dave Fridmann. It features songwriting collaborations, a first for MGMT, with Wimberly, Ariel Pink and MGMT live band member James Richardson. It also features contributions from Sébastien Tellier and Connan Mockasin. Little Dark Age was preceded by the release of four singles: "Little Dark Age", "When You Die", "Hand It Over", and "Me and Michael".

The album received positive reviews from music critics, who saw it as a slight return to the pop style of the band's debut album, Oracular Spectacular. It peaked at No. 35 on the Billboard 200.

== Writing and recording ==
"The way we wrote [Little Dark Age] was a lot more like how we used to write in college. One of us would have an idea, or just send over chords, bass and drums, and then the other person would add another part or the next section. We built the songs like that."

— Andrew VanWyngarden

When MGMT concluded touring at the end of 2014, Andrew VanWyngarden and Ben Goldwasser decided to take a short break from music and focus on their personal lives. VanWyngarden moved into a house in Rockaway Beach, Queens and Goldwasser moved to Los Angeles, California. Eventually, the duo regrouped at the end of 2015. VanWyngarden went out to Goldwasser's Los Angeles studio a few times and Goldwasser came back to New York to record at VanWyngarden's attic recording space. When they weren't visiting each other, the two would trade their ideas for songs by email. They initially decided to abandon the loose and improvisational writing style they employed on Congratulations (2010) and MGMT (2013) and revert to the creative method used with Oracular Spectacular (2007), where each member would come to their songwriting sessions with fully formed ideas. However, recording sessions weren't fruitful.

A turning point came when the band hired former Chairlift member Patrick Wimberly to help produce the album. The band has credited Wimberly with acting as an enabler for them, getting them excited when they had good ideas and encouraging them to go down the paths that he saw as promising. The song "James" came about after Wimberly and VanWyngarden took a large dose of LSD. Initially an unproductive session, a keyboard loop sent by Goldwasser inspired the two and the track was finished the same day. The song features VanWyngarden singing beneath his usual vocal range, which he prescribed to the fact that he had "spent hours screaming at the top of my lungs about Pakistan." Wimberly also encouraged the duo to invite musicians to collaborate on their songs. They opened their writing process up to others for the first time, with Goldwasser and VanWyngarden together having written the entirety of MGMT's original songs up to that point. MGMT hosted a two-week jam session, with various players stopping by and laying down tracks, and then edited and sorted through the recordings later. These sessions included drummer Josh Da Costa and James Richardson, a longtime member of the MGMT live band. The band also brought in Los Angeles native Ariel Pink and New Zealander Connan Mockasin. The band credited Ariel Pink with helping them relax and write on the spot. Pink had written lyrics on a piece of paper "in about four minutes", incorporating things they had just said in the hallway. Pink had VanWyngarden sing the lyrics, which he described as "liberating" to not spend days meticulously writing lyrics. Goldwasser agreed, saying, "Having someone like Ariel come over and show us that it was possible to do something spontaneous and off the cuff and still have it be meaningful was really inspiring for us, and necessary." The band had been writing through improvisation similar to how they wrote their previous album, MGMT (2013). Goldwasser described this breakthrough as a rediscovering of the "playfulness" and speed at which they wrote songs in the band's early days as students at Wesleyan University.

With Wimberly's help, the band eventually ended up with approximately 40 song ideas and a few complete compositions. In November 2016, they drove to and continued recording at Tarbox Road Studios in Cassadaga, New York with producer Dave Fridmann, who produced MGMT's debut album and 2013 self-titled album. They had hoped to record with Fridmann much earlier but delays pushed back their plans. They had begun recording with Fridmann and Wimberly at Tarbox in late September 2016. Instead of using distortion on an entire mix like before, Fridmann left a lot more room in the mix that helped the band achieve a less abrasive sound. The period of recording with Fridmann coincided with the 2016 United States presidential election, which heavily influenced the band. Goldwasser explained, "I think a lot of the things that we'd been hung up on, like questions of how do you be creative, what does it mean for us to express ourselves right now, what is an MGMT album in 2017 — all these dumb questions revealed themselves as dumb questions. We wanted to make songs that reflected how we were feeling in the moment, and we wanted to make something that was fun because we were in bad moods."

== Artwork and title ==
The album's cover artwork features an illustration by Jim Taber. It originally appeared in 1988 on the front cover of the first issue of Witness to the Bizarre, a literary horror and supernatural zine edited by Melinda Jaeb. The figure featured on the cover has been described as "a crude rendering of Edvard Munch's The Scream in clown makeup."

The album's gatefold features one side of a double-sided drawing titled Nénuphars/Paix Christi (English: Water lilies/Peace Christ) by Swiss artist Aloïse Corbaz. Corbaz was institutionalized at Lausanne's Hospital of Cery for schizophrenia in 1918. There, in 1920, she began drawing and writing poetry. The gatefold artwork includes the Paix Christi side of the drawing. However, the album's liner notes incorrectly credit the Nénuphars side of the work. The drawings depict two couples romantically embracing each another. Flowers, leaves and other decorative motifs crowd the spaces in and around the couples. Nénuphars/Paix Christi is part of the American Folk Art Museum's collection in New York City.

The band has explained that Little Dark Age is both an expression of surprise and dismay to the current political and social climate—particularly the election of Donald Trump as President of the United States—with an occasional reference to their own personal lives. Of the election, VanWyngarden stated, "We were like, 'Wow, is it actually possible for the most impossible thing to happen?' [...] Apparently, we were more inspired to write pop music after evil took over the world." VanWyngarden also explained, "We called it Little Dark Age because that's hopeful. It's a little dark age. And we ended the album with 'Hand It Over' because it envisions an end to all of this."

== Release and tour ==
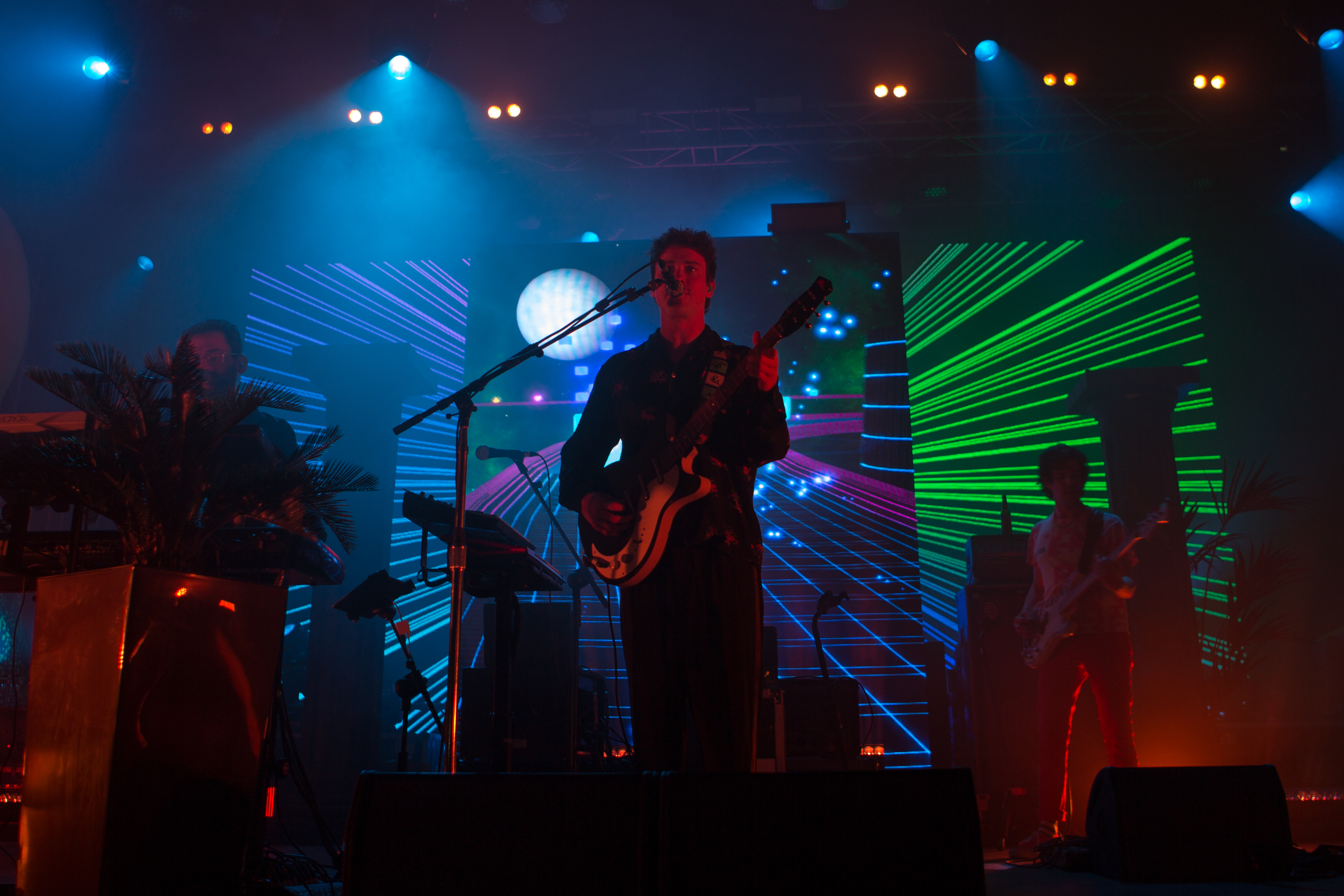
MGMT at Poble Espanyol in Barcelona, Spain on October 25, 2018

On December 26, 2015, the band tweeted announcing that they would return in 2016. On May 8, 2017, the band released a teaser video on Instagram alongside the title of the forthcoming album as Little Dark Age, following a series of cryptic tweets the week prior. On June 20, the band revealed that their next album had been mastered. On October 17, the band released "Little Dark Age", the title track from their new album and their first single in four years. "When You Die" was released as the second single on December 12, 2017. The third single from the record, "Hand It Over", was released on January 5, 2018. "Me and Michael" was released as the fourth and final single on February 7, 2018.

MGMT began the Little Dark Age Tour on January 30, 2018, in Berlin, Germany. The tour features several performances at music festivals, including NOS Alive, Splendour in the Grass, and Fuji Rock Festival.

== Critical reception ==
Professional ratings
Aggregate scores
Source	Rating
AnyDecentMusic?	7.2/10
Metacritic	77/100
Review scores
Source	Rating
AllMusic	3/5 stars
Chicago Tribune	3/4 stars
The Guardian	4/5 stars
Mojo	4/5 stars
NME	4/5 stars
The Observer	4/5 stars
Pitchfork	7.0/10
Q	4/5 stars
Rolling Stone	3.5/5 stars
Uncut	7/10

Little Dark Age received mostly positive reviews from music critics. At Metacritic, which assigns a normalized rating out of 100 to reviews from mainstream critics, the album has an average score of 77 based on 24 reviews, indicating "generally favorable reviews".

Writing for NME, Jordan Bassett considered the album to be a return to form for the band after their previous two albums, noting that "if there were a time for an about-return, it was that third record. They'd enjoyed their foray into experimentation, and a self-titled album often indicates a band that's come back into focus. Here, though, we're treated to an overdue loop back to pop hookiness." Bassett also went on to commend the band's return to pop as a "welcome surprise". Terence Cawley of The Boston Globe expressed a similar view, asserting that the album was "both hooky and eccentric enough to please MGMT fans of all stripes." Mark Kennedy of the Associated Press gave a positive review, stating that "MGMT have once more delivered an off-kilter, challenging and very addictive album." Rolling Stone's Jon Dolan said, "MGMT are back to their roots on Little Dark Age, with concise tunes built from cushy keyboard beats and cute, kiting melodies."

Spin's Austin Brown called the album "easygoing but frustrating", saying, "Little Dark Age is pleasant enough, but it's hard to look past a glaring dearth of ideas." AllMusic's Tim Sendra said, "They sound like a band treading water, desperately looking for their place in the modern pop landscape and never deciding whether to go pop or stay totally weird. This indecision leaves them stuck in the middle of the road, which isn't a very interesting place to be." Writing for Consequence of Sound, Sasha Geffen said, "There are some sweet moments on Little Dark Age and some stale ones. More often than not, Andrew VanWyngarden and Ben Goldwasser lapse back into a sardonic mode that sounded a whole lot better in 2007 than it does in 2018."

=== Year-end lists ===
Publication	Country	Rank	List
Gaffa	Denmark	3	Årets Album 2018
Newsweek	United States	—N/a	The Best Albums 2018
Paste	United States	17	The 50 Best Albums of 2018
Stereogum	United States	39	The Best Albums of 2018
Under the Radar	United States	17	Top 100 Albums of 2018

== Track listing ==
All lyrics are written by Andrew VanWyngarden; all music is composed by VanWyngarden and Ben Goldwasser; except where noted.

Little Dark Age
No.	Title	Lyrics	Music	Length
1.	"She Works Out Too Much"			4:38
2.	"Little Dark Age"			4:59
3.	"When You Die"	VanWyngarden; Ariel Pink	VanWyngarden; Goldwasser; Pink	4:23
4.	"Me and Michael"			4:49
5.	"TSLAMP"		VanWyngarden; Goldwasser; James Richardson	4:29
6.	"James"			3:52
7.	"Days That Got Away"		VanWyngarden; Goldwasser; Jonathan Patrick Wimberly; Connan Mockasin	4:44
8.	"One Thing Left to Try"			4:20
9.	"When You're Small"	VanWyngarden; Goldwasser	VanWyngarden; Goldwasser; Richardson	3:30
10.	"Hand It Over"			4:14
Total length:				43:58

== Personnel ==
Credits adapted from liner notes and Qobuz.

MGMT

- Andrew VanWyngarden – vocals (tracks 1–8, 10), drums (tracks 1, 4–6, 8–10), synthesizer (tracks 1, 2, 4, 5, 8, 10), programming (tracks 1, 2, 4, 8, 10), guitar (tracks 3–5, 8, 10), percussion (tracks 3, 7), bass (tracks 5, 7, 9, 10), background vocals (track 9), keyboards (track 10)
- Ben Goldwasser – synthesizer (tracks 1–6, 8–10), programming (tracks 1, 2, 4, 6–8, 10), bass (track 1), background vocals (track 1), vocals (tracks 3, 9), flute (track 3), organ (track 7), keyboards (tracks 9, 10)

Production

- MGMT – production, engineering
- Patrick Wimberly – production, engineering
- Dave Fridmann – production, engineering, mixing
- Miles Benjamin Anthony Robinson – additional engineering
- Celso A. Estrada – assistant engineering (Kingsize Soundlabs)
- Tyler Karmen – assistant engineering (Kingsize Soundlabs)
- Matt Estep – assistant mix engineering
- Greg Calbi – mastering
- Steve Fallone – mastering

Additional musicians

- Josh Da Costa – additional drums (track 1)
- Ariel Pink – synthesizer (track 1), guitars (track 3), background vocals (tracks 1, 3)
- Danny Meyer – saxophone (track 1)
- Cellars – vocals (track 1)
- Patrick Wimberly – percussion (tracks 3, 7), vocals (track 4), bass (track 7), vibraphone (track 9)
- Sébastien Tellier – background vocals (track 3)
- Connan Mockasin – background vocals (track 3), guitar (track 7)
- James Richardson – additional bass (track 2), synthesizer (tracks 5, 7), French horn (track 6), recorder (track 7), guitar (tracks 7, 9), bass (track 9)

== Charts ==
Chart (2018)	Peak position
Australian Albums (ARIA)	31
Austrian Albums (Ö3 Austria)	23
Belgian Albums (Ultratop Flanders)	16
Belgian Albums (Ultratop Wallonia)	61
Canadian Albums (Billboard)	29
Croatian International Albums (HDU)	28
Czech Albums (ČNS IFPI)	54
Dutch Albums (Album Top 100)	48
French Albums (SNEP)	45
German Albums (Offizielle Top 100)	22
Greek Albums (IFPI)	22
Irish Albums (IRMA)	36
New Zealand Heatseeker Albums (RMNZ)	1
Portuguese Albums (AFP)	13
Scottish Albums (Official Charts)	18
Spanish Albums (PROMUSICAE)	40
Swiss Albums (Schweizer Hitparade)	12
UK Albums (Official Charts)	27
US Billboard 200	35
US Top Alternative Albums (Billboard)	2
US Top Rock Albums (Billboard)	2

== Certifications ==
Certifications for Little Dark Age
Region	Certification	Certified units/sales
Poland (ZPAV)	Gold	10,000^{‡}
^{‡} Sales+streaming figures based on certification alone.
