= Me and Michael =

Single by MGMT

from the album Little Dark Age
- Released: February 7, 2018
- Recorded: 2017
- Genre: Synth-pop
- Length: 4:49
- Label: Columbia
- Composers: Andrew VanWyngarden; Ben Goldwasser
- Lyricist: VanWyngarden
- Producers: MGMT; Patrick Wimberly; Dave Fridmann

MGMT singles chronology
"Hand It Over" (2017)	"Me and Michael" (2018)	"In the Afternoon" (2019)

"Me and Michael" (stylized as Me & Michael) is a song by American rock band MGMT. It is the fourth single taken from the band's fourth studio album Little Dark Age. It was released worldwide on February 7, 2018 through Columbia.

== Background ==
The song was heavily influenced by English electronic band OMD. Talking to Q, the band discussed the origin of the titular "Michael" with Ben Goldwasser saying the original refrain was written as "me and my girl," but decided it was "so boring and cheesy" and decided to change it into "me and Michael." Goldwasser said this "developed into this ambiguous story, and we really liked that – writing a catchy song that gets you pumped-up, but you have no idea what the message is."

== Music video ==
The music video for "Me and Michael" was directed by Joey Frank and Randy Lee Maitland and was released on February 7, 2018. As of April 2024, the video has been viewed over 5.3 million times through the band's official Vevo account on YouTube.

The video tells the story of MGMT learning of the consequences of "stealing" the song from the Filipino band True Faith, who in reality did not write the song, but were invited by MGMT to make a cover, titled "Ako at si Michael", and star in the music video. It features Michael Buscemi (brother of Steve Buscemi), who also made the video's title card.

== Track listing ==
All lyrics are written by Andrew VanWyngarden; all music is composed by VanWyngarden and Ben Goldwasser.

Digital download and stream
No.	Title	Length
1.	"Me and Michael"	4:49

== Personnel ==
MGMT

- Andrew VanWyngarden – vocals, guitar, synthesizer, drums, programming
- Ben Goldwasser – synthesizer, programming

Additional Performer

- Patrick Wimberly – vocals

== Charts ==
Chart (2018)	Peak position
France (SNEP)	160
US Hot Rock & Alternative Songs (Billboard)	29
