= When You Die =

Single by MGMT

from the album Little Dark Age
- Released: December 12, 2017
- Recorded: 2017
- Length: 4:23
- Label: Columbia
- Composers: Andrew VanWyngarden; Ben Goldwasser; Ariel Pink
- Lyricists: VanWyngarden; Pink
- Producers: MGMT; Patrick Wimberly; Dave Fridmann

MGMT singles chronology
"Little Dark Age" (2017)	"When You Die" (2017)	"Hand It Over" (2018)

Music video
- "When You Die" on YouTube

"When You Die" is a song by the American pop and rock band MGMT, and the second single from the band's fourth studio album Little Dark Age. It was released worldwide on December 12, 2017, through Columbia Records.

== Recording ==
The song was recorded in 2017. It was co-written by Ariel Pink, who also plays guitar on the song.

== Artwork ==
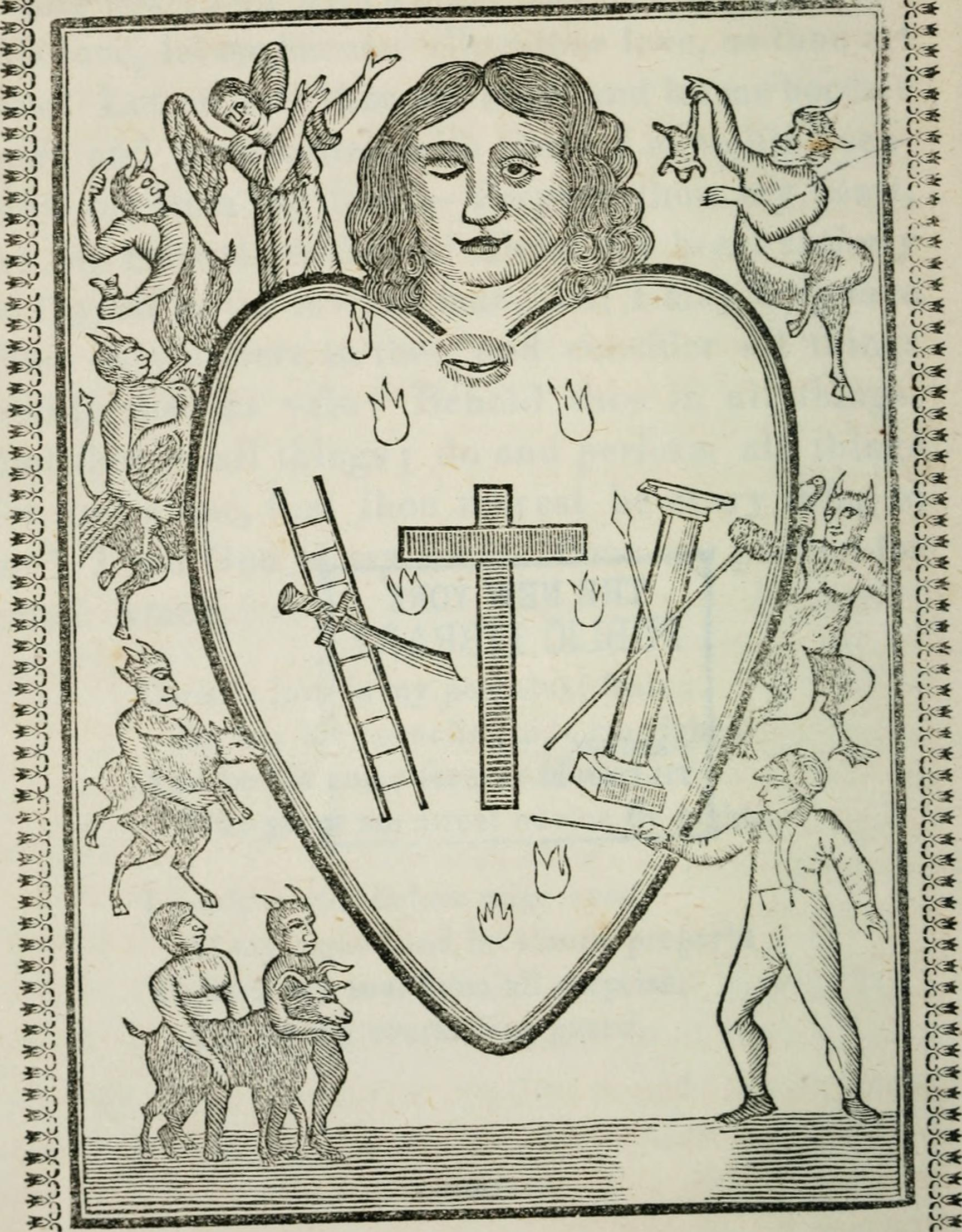
The Heart of Man; Either a Temple of God, or a Habitation of Satan; Represented in Ten Emblematical Figures, p.38

The song's artwork is based on an illustration in The Heart of Man; Either a Temple of God, or a Habitation of Satan; Represented in Ten Emblematical Figures, an 1851 book by German religious figure Johannes Evangelista Gossner.

== Music video ==
The music video was directed by Mike Burakoff and Hallie Cooper-Novack, and was released on December 12, 2017 through The New Yorker along with the audio release. The video stars Alex Karpovsky and Lucy Kaminsky, with Karpovsky playing a failing magician that appears to die and watch his death through a psychedelic trip presumably in purgatory.

== Track listing ==
All lyrics are written by Andrew VanWyngarden and Ariel Pink; all music is composed by VanWyngarden, Ben Goldwasser and Pink.

Digital download and stream
No.	Title	Length
1.	"When You Die"	4:23

== Personnel ==
MGMT

- Andrew VanWyngarden – vocals, guitar, percussion, producer
- Ben Goldwasser – synthesizer, vocals, flute, producer

Additional Personnel

- Ariel Pink – guitar, background vocals
- Patrick Wimberly – percussion, production, engineering
- Dave Fridmann – production, engineering, mixing
- Connan Mockasin – background vocals
- Sébastien Tellier – background vocals

== Charts ==
Chart (2017)	Peak position
US Hot Rock & Alternative Songs (Billboard)	35
