= 11-11-11 (album) =

11•11•11

Live album by MGMT
- Released: November 11, 2022
- Recorded: November 11, 2011
- Venues: Solomon R. Guggenheim Museum, Manhattan, New York City
- Length: 42:30
- Label: MGMT Records
- Producer: MGMT

MGMT chronology
Little Dark Age (2018)	11•11•11 (2022)	Loss of Life (2024)

Professional ratings
Review scores
Source	Rating
Pitchfork	6.7/10

11•11•11 is a live album by American rock band MGMT, released on November 11, 2022. The album contains original music performed at the Solomon R. Guggenheim Museum in Manhattan, New York City. It marked the first major release by the band since 2018's Little Dark Age.

== Background ==
MGMT was commissioned by the Solomon R. Guggenheim Museum to write an original composition for the retrospective of installation artist Maurizio Cattelan, featuring 130 art pieces suspended in mid air. The new material would be performed at the exhibits private opening on November 10, 2011, and then again at the exhibits public debut the next day. In a statement by the band, they stated "The art exhibition is done in a completely original way, so it deserves music which is completely original", also stating that they were "creating a musical experience that works for the building and for the construction and presentation of the Cattelan exhibit."

== Reception ==
Writing for Pitchfork, Evan Rytlewski enjoyed the record, giving it a 6.7/10. According to Rytlewski, the band "floated new ways to balance their melody-forward sensibilities with their artier, more exploratory instincts" during the performance. Furthermore, believing that for having such a small audience, there's "a lot of creativity here", sounding like a lost studio record at its most inspired. Albeit, stating that "in its mellower lulls and boxy acoustics the recording sounds more like what it is: background music for an art show".

They described tracks such as "Invocation" and "I Am Not Your Home" as being "formal" and casting "the oblique shadows of Radiohead". On the other hand, they stated that the instrumental pieces on the record "frolic into sheer whimsy", with tracks such as "Forest Elf" playing like "celestial on-hold music", while "Whistling Through the Graveyard" conjures up "old children's Christmas music by way of circus calliopes and lost exotica records". Overall, the record "inevitably takes on a different context than it would have if the band hadn't waited over a decade to release it, since now we know how their arc played out", stating that "as a record, it's fine, but as a career move, it felt like a retreat", overall, believing that "11•11•11 invites nostalgia for when this band was still torn between its impulse to entertain and its personal mission to challenge".

According to The New York Times upon the original show's release, "after 10 p.m., band members of MGMT, standing on a stage covered in white faux-fur, played a 45-minute piece, composed for the occasion, at times the music sounded like Laurie Anderson's, and at others like a Caribbean slow jam. A slick young crowd stood mesmerized while a Vegas-bright kaleidoscope of color flickered through the rotunda".

== Track listing ==
All songs written by Andrew VanWyngarden, Ben Goldwasser, Will Berman, James Richardson, and Matthew Asti, except where noted.

11•11•11 track listing
No.	Title	Writer(s)	Length
1.	"Introduction"		2:28
2.	"Invocation"		3:11
3.	"Whistling Through the Graveyard"		2:59
4.	"Forest Elf"	Richardson, VanWyngarden, Goldwasser, Berman, Asti	2:33
5.	"Tell It to Me Like It Is"		9:12
6.	"I Am Not Your Home"		5:16
7.	"Unfriend"		5:11
8.	"Who's Counting"		4:01
9.	"Interlude"		0:26
10.	"Whistling Past the Graveyard"	Richardson, VanWyngarden, Goldwasser, Berman, Asti	0:30
11.	"Under the Porch"		6:38
Total length:			42:30

== Personnel ==
All credits for 11-11-11 are adapted from the album’s liner notes.

=== MGMT ===
- Andrew VanWyngarden – vocals, guitar, keyboards
- Ben Goldwasser – synths, electronics
- James Richardson – guitar, keyboards
- Will Berman – drums
- Matthew Asti – bass

=== Technical personnel ===
- MGMT – production, mixing
- Dave Fridmann – mixing, mastering
- Michael Parker – live recording
- Hannah Rawe – album art
- Jamie Dutcher – album design
- Mehan Jayasuriya – photography
- Alejandro Crawford – lighting, grahics
- Peter Danilowicz – stage crew
- David MacNutt – stage crew
