= John Tintori =

American film editor and director

- Occupations: Film editor, director

John Tintori is an American film editor and director. Among his editing credits are Eight Men Out (1988), Dogfight (1991), Mr. Wonderful (1993), Roommates (1995), and David Blaine's documentary Frozen In Time. In 1997, he co-directed and co-edited Chicago Cab with his wife, Mary Cybulski. His son, Ray Tintori, was also in the film industry.

== Career ==
John Tintori's editing works also included TV commercials, video and short films. One short film he edited is Trevor, which won an Oscar in 1995. His career work includes as associate editor for The Brother from Another Planet, script supervisor for Matewan, and editor for David Blaine's Frozen in Time for ABC. Tintori also wrote the writing screenplays, Wise Child, Murder Most Foul for Columbia Pictures and Interstate for HBO. Tintori holds the membership of the Directors Guild of America, the Writers Guild of America, the IATSE, member the Tisch/Kanbar faculty (since 1997), ex-chair of the Graduate Film Program, NYU (2006 - 2014), and ex-chair of the Graduate Film Program at TischAsia in Singapore.
