= Little Dark Age (song) =

2017 song by MGMT

Single by MGMT

from the album Little Dark Age
- Released: October 17, 2017
- Genre: Synth-pop; gothic pop
- Length: 4:59
- Label: Columbia
- Composers: Andrew VanWyngarden; Ben Goldwasser
- Lyricist: Andrew VanWyngarden
- Producers: MGMT; Patrick Wimberly; Dave Fridmann

MGMT singles chronology
| "Cool Song No. 2" (2013) | "Little Dark Age" (2017) | "When You Die" (2017) |

Music video
- "Little Dark Age" on YouTube

"Little Dark Age" is a song by American rock band MGMT. It was released as the lead single from their fourth studio album, Little Dark Age, on October 17, 2017, through Columbia Records.

== Background ==
In an interview with Newsweek, Andrew VanWyngarden, the lead vocalist, guitar player and songwriter for the band stated that 1980s Soviet synth-pop was influential to the song.

== Release ==
Leading up to the song's release, the band made several posts on their social media hyping up the album and then upcoming single. On October 12, 2017, the band posted a video clip of the beginning instrumental of the song to their social media with the caption "#LittleDarkAge". "Little Dark Age" was released as a digital single on October 17 through Columbia Records. The song was released with an accompanying music video.

== Artwork ==
The cover artwork for the single features a panel from a 1982 pornographic manga called Bara-iro no Kaibutsu ('Rose-Colored Monster') by Japanese artist Suehiro Maruo. In the text-bubble, the character states the following: "I call this 'Discovery of Africa.'"

== Critical reception ==
"Little Dark Age" received generally positive reviews from critics. Writing for Spin, Jeremy Gordon called the song "grim and playful". He said the song and video were "dark, but only a little, and the vibe feels appropriate for where they are now—older, and without office jobs, but recognizant of what's still gone wrong." Robin Murray of Clash observed "a return to concise pop", adding, "If subsequent records failed to match the pop tendencies of their debut, well, fear no more – MGMT seem to have recovered that synth pop midas touch. New single 'Little Dark Age'... recalls the slightly darker, more left field wing of British synth pop – think OMD, Japan, or early Tears for Fears."

In a less favorable review, Pitchfork's Kevin Lozano criticized the song as having "a feeling of costumery", writing, "MGMT heavily reference the Cure's goth pop, replacing candy-colored synths with darker, more brooding models. Altogether the instrumentation feels more like an homage than a thoughtful reinvention, with turgid vocals bringing the song down."

== Music video ==
The music video for "Little Dark Age", directed by David MacNutt and Nathaniel Axel, premiered on October 17, 2017. The video was considered out of character and surprisingly gothic for the band. Jeremy Gordon of Spin called the video "Dada-esque". The cast includes, among others, VanWyngarden and Goldwasser along with New Zealand musician Connan Mockasin, Playboy Playmate Hiromi Oshima, and magician Kid Ace.

== Resurgence and online usage ==
In late 2020, it experienced a resurgence in popularity due to a viral TikTok trend where hundreds of thousands utilized the song. A report published in August 2021 by the Institute for Strategic Dialogue found that "Little Dark Age" was "by far the most popular Sound among extremist creators on TikTok" and was central to videos promoting "Hyperborea and a wider trend of esoteric Nazism". The song has also been used to soundtrack clips of anime, superhero movies, video games, Renaissance art as well as a wide range of social issues, including transgender rights, the Black Lives Matter movement and the Russian invasion of Ukraine.

In 2024, Alexis Petridis of The Guardian wrote: "Certainly its adoption doesn't say much for your average neo-Nazi's ability to understand English. 'Little Dark Age''s lyrics are, fairly obviously, an excoriation of Trump-era America and racist police violence."

On June 29, 2024, an election campaign advertisement using a slowed-down, unauthorized version of the song was posted to then British Prime Minister Rishi Sunak's Twitter account, promoting the Conservative Party's stance on the British Armed Forces. The video was also posted to Sunak's account on Facebook, from which it was removed on July 1. The band has sent numerous takedown notices sent to Twitter and a cease and desist letter sent to the Tories, but the video has not been removed from the site. On July 4 (UK election day), MGMT responded to the Conservative Party's usage of the song in a statement to NME: "How many times do we have to remind you jokers that this song is NOT fair game for your utter garbage? Let's all laugh at this dingus. Clock's ticking, mate. Happy Independence Day".

On October 25, 2025, MGMT forced ICE to take down a post from October 23 depicting federal agents arresting protestors and using the same slowed-down, unauthorized remix, with the caption: "End of the Dark Age, beginning of the Golden Age." A statement from the band on October 24, 2025, read: "MGMT is aware of 'Little Dark Age' being featured in a propaganda video by the Department of Homeland Security and has issued a takedown request for the unauthorized use of their music."

== Credits ==
- Andrew VanWyngarden – vocals, synthesizer, programming, producer
- Ben Goldwasser – synthesizer, programming, producer
- James Richardson – additional bass guitar
- Patrick Wimberly – producer
- Dave Fridmann – producer

== Charts ==
| Chart (2017) | Peak position |
|---|---|
| Mexico Ingles Airplay (Billboard) | 37 |
| US Alternative Digital Songs (Billboard) | 23 |
| US Hot Rock & Alternative Songs (Billboard) | 32 |

| Chart (2021) | Peak position |
|---|---|
| Lithuania (AGATA) | 85 |

== Certifications ==
| Region | Certification | Certified units/sales |
|---|---|---|
| France (SNEP) | Platinum | 200,000^{‡} |
| Italy (FIMI) | Gold | 50,000^{‡} |
| Mexico (AMPROFON) | Gold | 30,000^{‡} |
| New Zealand (RMNZ) | Platinum | 30,000^{‡} |
| Poland (ZPAV) | Platinum | 50,000^{‡} |
| Spain (Promusicae) | Gold | 30,000^{‡} |
| United Kingdom (BPI) | Platinum | 600,000^{‡} |
| United States (RIAA) | 2× Platinum | 2,000,000^{‡} |
^{‡} Sales+streaming figures based on certification alone.
