= Oracular Spectacular =

Studio album by MGMT
- Released: October 2, 2007
- Recorded: 2004–2007
- Studios: Tarbox Road (Cassadaga, New York); Context (Brooklyn, New York)
- Genres: New rave; neo-psychedelia; indietronica; electronic rock; psychedelic pop; psychedelic rock; synth-pop
- Length: 40:30
- Labels: Columbia; RED Ink
- Producers: Dave Fridmann; MGMT

MGMT chronology
Time to Pretend (2005)	Oracular Spectacular (2007)	Congratulations (2010)

Singles from Oracular Spectacular
- 1. "Time to Pretend" Released: March 3, 2008; 2. "Electric Feel" Released: June 23, 2008; 3. "Kids" Released: October 13, 2008

Alternative cover
- Original cover

Oracular Spectacular is the debut studio album by the American band MGMT, released on October 2, 2007, by RED Ink and physically on January 22, 2008, by Columbia. It was produced by Dave Fridmann and is the band's first release of new content, recorded from March to April 2007. The album was promoted with three singles: "Time to Pretend", "Electric Feel" and "Kids". Both "Time to Pretend" and "Kids" were re-recorded for the album; they were originally included on the band's previous release Time to Pretend (2005), with the opening track serving as a "mission statement" and the theme continuing through the album's subsequent tracks.

Although Oracular Spectacular never sold more than 17,000 units in a week, at least 2,000 copies per week were sold during the period from January 2008 through April 2010. The album received positive reviews from critics, who lauded its production style, musical direction and composition. It was nominated for the International Album award at the 2009 Brit Awards. In 2012, Rolling Stone ranked the album at number 494 on its list of The 500 Greatest Albums of All Time.

== Background ==
The duo recorded with music producer Dave Fridmann in 2007 for their major label debut, Oracular Spectacular. MGMT opened for Of Montreal on tour in autumn 2007 as a five-piece touring band including Matthew Asti (bass), James Richardson (drums), and Hank Sullivant (guitar).

Promotion for the album started as early as June 2007, when the song "Weekend Wars" was given away in summer issues of free monthly magazine Nöjesguiden in Stockholm, Sweden. Matching CDs could be picked up for free in all stores in three different shopping malls around Stockholm from June 26 to July 31.

In November 2007, they performed for the first time in Europe, supporting the band Samantha and The Courteeners at Koko in London, England. After March 2008, Hank Sullivant left the band to pursue his own band, Kuroma. Will Berman joined as the new drummer, James Richardson switched from drums to guitar, and Matthew Asti remained on bass.

The album was also promoted with three singles: "Time to Pretend", "Electric Feel" and "Kids".

== Reception ==
Professional ratings
Aggregate scores
Source	Rating
Metacritic	76/100
Review scores
Source	Rating
AllMusic	4/5 stars
Alternative Press	4.5/5 stars
The Guardian	4/5 stars
The Independent	3/5 stars
NME	8/10
The Observer	4/5 stars
Pitchfork	6.8/10
Q	4/5 stars
Rolling Stone	3.5/5 stars
Uncut	4/5 stars

Oracular Spectacular has received mostly positive reviews. Jason Lymangrover of AllMusic called Oracular Spectacular's tracks "some of the catchiest pop songs to come from NYC since the turn of the millennium" and stated that "the songs never feel insincere and the record is inherently strong throughout, making it a solid start to their career." Prefix Magazine described the album as "a college-dorm experiment gone horribly right." Giving the album a three-star honorable mention rating, Robert Christgau stated that "like Vampire Weekend, only as synth-dance rather than indie-rock, they convert a quality liberal education into thoughtful, anxious, faux-lite pop."

In a mixed review, PopMatters' Matt Fiander criticized the second half of the album, writing, "The second half of the record settles into a more monotone kind of space rock that is as big as the better first half, but gives us no recognizably distinct songs or catchy melodies." The album was named as the best album of 2008 by NME. In 2009, Rolling Stone named it the 18th-best album of the decade, and in 2012 the magazine included it at number 494 on its list of the 500 greatest albums of all time, saying, "Two hipster geeks get some rad vintage keyboards and compose a suite of synthesized heartache".

The album has a Metacritic score of 76 out of 100 on based on 22 critics, indicating "generally favorable reviews".

== Track listing ==
All lyrics are written by Andrew VanWyngarden, except where noted; all music is composed by VanWyngarden and Ben Goldwasser, except where noted.

No.	Title	Lyrics	Music	Length
1.	"Time to Pretend"			4:21
2.	"Weekend Wars"			4:12
3.	"The Youth"	VanWyngarden, Goldwasser, Will Berman		3:48
4.	"Electric Feel"		VanWyngarden, Goldwasser, Berman	3:49
5.	"Kids"			5:02
6.	"4th Dimensional Transition"			3:58
7.	"Pieces of What"			2:43
8.	"Of Moons, Birds & Monsters"			4:46
9.	"The Handshake"			3:39
10.	"Future Reflections"			4:00
Total length:				40:30

Japanese original version
No.	Title	Length
11.	"Time to Pretend" (Jorge Elbrecht of Violens Remix)	4:30
Total length:		44:36

Japanese re-release
No.	Title	Lyrics	Music	Length
1.	"Time to Pretend"			4:21
2.	"Weekend Wars"			4:12
3.	"The Handshake"			3:39
4.	"The Youth"	VanWyngarden, Goldwasser, Berman		3:48
5.	"Electric Feel"	VanWyngarden, Goldwasser	VanWyngarden, Goldwasser, Berman	3:49
6.	"4th Dimensional Transition"			3:58
7.	"Pieces of What"			2:43
8.	"Of Moons, Birds & Monsters"			4:46
9.	"Kids"			5:02
10.	"Future Reflections"			3:58
11.	"Metanoia"			13:49
12.	"Electric Feel" (Demo Version)			4:24
13.	"Electric Feel" (Justice remix)			5:25
14.	"Kids" (Soulwax remix)			5:39
15.	"Time to Pretend" (music video)			4:19
16.	"Electric Feel" (music video)			3:50
17.	"Kids" (music video)			5:06
Total length:				1:18:48

Notes

- An earlier version of "Time to Pretend" appeared on Time to Pretend EP.
- An earlier version of "Kids" appeared on We (Don't) Care, Climbing to New Lows and Time to Pretend EP.

== Personnel ==
MGMT

- Andrew VanWyngarden – vocals, lead and rhythm guitars, synthesizers, bass guitar, drums, percussion, production
- Ben Goldwasser – vocals, keyboards, synthesizers, sampling, rhythm guitar, percussion, production

Additional personnel

- Dave Fridmann – production, engineering, mixing; Thingamagoop on "Time to Pretend"
- Greg Calbi – mastering

== Charts ==
=== Weekly charts ===
Chart (2008)	Peak position
Australian Albums (ARIA)	4
Austrian Albums (Ö3 Austria)	72
Belgian Albums (Ultratop Flanders)	10
Belgian Albums (Ultratop Wallonia)	55
Canadian Albums (Billboard)	24
Croatian International Albums (HDU)	34
Dutch Albums (Album Top 100)	45
French Albums (SNEP)	22
German Albums (Offizielle Top 100)	65
Irish Albums (IRMA)	5
Italian Albums (FIMI)	74
Japanese Albums (Oricon)	114
Mexican Albums (Top 100 Mexico)	74
New Zealand Albums (RMNZ)	13
Swiss Albums (Schweizer Hitparade)	68
UK Albums (Official Charts)	8
US Billboard 200	38

Chart (2025–2026)	Peak position
Greek Albums (IFPI)	8
Portuguese Albums (AFP)	143

=== Year-end charts ===
Chart (2008)	Position
Australian Albums (ARIA)	16
Belgian Albums (Ultratop Flanders)	35
European Albums (Billboard)	93
French Albums (SNEP)	77
UK Albums (OCC)	65

Chart (2009)	Position
Australian Albums (ARIA)	85
Belgian Albums (Ultratop Flanders)	79
European Albums (Billboard)	94
French Albums (SNEP)	96
US Billboard 200	117

== Certifications ==
Region	Certification	Certified units/sales
Australia (ARIA)	Platinum	70,000^{^}
Belgium (BRMA)	Gold	15,000^{*}
Canada (Music Canada)	Platinum	100,000^{‡}
Denmark (IFPI Danmark)	Platinum	20,000^{‡}
France (SNEP)	Silver	35,000^{*}
Germany (BVMI)	Gold	100,000^{‡}
Ireland (IRMA)	2× Platinum	30,000^{^}
Italy (FIMI) sales since 2009	Gold	25,000^{‡}
New Zealand (RMNZ)	3× Platinum	45,000^{‡}
United Kingdom (BPI)	2× Platinum	600,000^{‡}
United States (RIAA)	2× Platinum	2,000,000^{‡}
^{*} Sales figures based on certification alone.^{^} Shipments figures based on certification alone.^{‡} Sales+streaming figures based on certification alone.

== Awards ==
Title	Award	Result
NME Awards 2009	Best Track of 2009	Won
