= Time to Pretend =

2008 single by American indie band MGMT

Single by MGMT

from the album Oracular Spectacular
- B-side: "Metanoia"
- Released: March 3, 2008
- Recorded: 2005–2006
- Genre: Electronic rock; glam rock; synth-pop; indie pop
- Length: 4:19
- Label: Columbia
- Composers: Andrew VanWyngarden, Ben Goldwasser
- Lyricist: Andrew VanWyngarden
- Producer: Dave Fridmann

MGMT singles chronology
"Weekend Wars" (2007)	"Time to Pretend" (2008)	"Electric Feel" (2008)

Music video
- "Time to Pretend" on YouTube

"Time to Pretend" is a song by the American indie band MGMT, released as the lead single from their debut studio album Oracular Spectacular (2007) on March 3, 2008. An earlier version had been released on their Time to Pretend EP. The single was released as a 7" and CD single featuring the B-sides "Weekend Wars" (BBC Radio 1 Session) and "Metanoia", respectively. In early 2009, the song was re-released in the UK after featuring in the teen television drama series Skins. The song was ranked at number 493 on Rolling Stone's list of "The 500 Greatest Songs of All Time", and its parent album, Oracular Spectacular, was ranked at number 494 on the publication's additional list of "The 500 Greatest Albums of All Time". The song was also ranked at number 90 on NME's list of The 500 Greatest Songs of All Time.

== Background ==
The track was originally recorded for the Time to Pretend EP (2005). It was re-recorded for the Oracular Spectacular album.

From a quote from live at Abbey Road:

We wrote "Time to Pretend" our senior year of college, and the music was inspired by a praying mantis we had in our house. She laid eggs and it died, and we laid the egg case on this kinda model pirate ship on the mantle piece, and the eggs hatched and all these baby praying mantises were climbing up the rigging of the ship, and it was pretty crazy...uhm so the music was inspired by our praying mantis that liked to dance to The Clash {laugh} and the lyrics are just about us imagining being rock stars ... and yeah, fantasy rock star life.

== Music video ==
The music video for the song contains references to Alejandro Jodorowsky's 1973 film The Holy Mountain and the 1954 novel Lord of the Flies. The video was directed by Ray Tintori, and features a cameo appearance by American recording artist Caroline Polachek.

Tiscali Music gave the video a rating of 10 out of 10. A 3D version of the video with minor changes to the original was also produced.

== Track listing ==
7" Single
No.	Title	Length
1.	"Time to Pretend"	4:19
2.	"Weekend Wars" (BBC Radio 1 session)	4:34

2 Track Promo
No.	Title	Length
1.	"Time to Pretend"	4:19
2.	"Time to Pretend" (Clean)	4:20

Radio Edit Promo
No.	Title	Length
1.	"Time to Pretend" (Radio edit)	4:11

2009 Digital Download
No.	Title	Length
1.	"Time to Pretend"	4:21
2.	"Future Reflections" (Triple J live recording)	4:10

== Personnel ==
Personnel taken from the Song Exploder podcast.

MGMT

- Andrew VanWyngarden – vocals, synthesizers, piano, drums
- Ben Goldwasser – vocals, synthesizers, horn samples

Additional personnel

- Dave Fridmann – production, Thingamagoop

== Reception ==
Kevin O'Donnell wrote in Rolling Stone that "Time to Pretend is a space-rock gem that mocks the clichéd coke-and-hookers rock-star lifestyle, over big synth whooshes."

The song hit #38 on the Mediabase Alternative chart. Time critic Josh Tyrangiel named Time to Pretend the #8 song of 2008. The song was #3 on Rolling Stone's list of the 100 Best Songs of 2008, #4 on NME's Best Singles of 2008, The song was ranked at number 493 on Rolling Stone's list of "The 500 Greatest Songs of All Time". NME ranked "Time to Pretend" as the 2nd best song of the 2000s. In October 2011, NME placed it at number 12 on its list "150 Best Tracks of the Past 15 Years".

== Charts ==
=== Weekly charts ===
Chart (2008)	Peak position
Australian ARIA Singles Chart	62
Canadian Hot 100	64
Irish Singles Chart	33
Japanese Singles Chart	75
Switzerland Airplay (Schweizer Hitparade)	89
UK Singles Chart	35
US Billboard Bubbling Under Hot 100 Singles	9
US Alternative Airplay (Billboard)	23
Billboard European Hot 100 Singles	99

=== Year-end charts ===
Chart (2008)	Position
UK Singles Chart	145
Chart (2009)	Position
UK Singles Chart	193

== Certifications ==
Region	Certification	Certified units/sales
Canada (Music Canada)	Platinum	80,000^{‡}
Italy (FIMI)	Gold	25,000^{‡}
New Zealand (RMNZ)	2× Platinum	60,000^{‡}
Spain (Promusicae)	Gold	30,000^{‡}
United Kingdom (BPI)	Platinum	600,000^{‡}
United States (RIAA)	3× Platinum	3,000,000^{‡}
^{‡} Sales+streaming figures based on certification alone.

== Television performances ==
MGMT performed the song "Time to Pretend" on Late Show with David Letterman on January 8, 2008. The song subsequently hit number 19 on the Mediabase U.S. Alternative chart. They later performed the song on Late Night with Conan O'Brien on May 15, 2008. The band returned to Letterman on May 11, 2010.

== Covers ==
- Covered by Black Country, New Road in 2021. It was later included in the band's Never Again EP.
- Covered by Paolo Nutini
- Covered by Charlie Hickey in 2023.

== Legacy ==
"Time to Pretend" has been sampled by several artists, most notably in Lasting Lover by Sigala and James Arthur (2020). The song was also used in at least two trailers: the first trailer for Spider-Man: Homecoming (2017) and the second trailer for A Minecraft Movie (2025).
