= Electric Feel =

Single by MGMT

from the album Oracular Spectacular
- Released: June 23, 2008
- Recorded: March – April 2007
- Studio: Tarbox Road Studios, Cassadaga, New York
- Genre: Electronic rock; indie rock; pop rock; psychedelic pop; synth-funk; disco
- Length: 3:50
- Label: Columbia
- Songwriters: Andrew VanWyngarden; Ben Goldwasser; Will Berman
- Composers: Andrew VanWyngarden; Ben Goldwasser; Will Berman
- Producers: Dave Fridmann; MGMT

MGMT singles chronology
"Time to Pretend" (2008)	"Electric Feel" (2008)	"Metanoia" (2008)

Music video
- "Electric Feel" on YouTube

"Electric Feel" is a song by the American rock band MGMT, released as the second single from their debut studio album Oracular Spectacular (2007) on June 23, 2008. The single was released as a 7" and CD single, and later on 12" vinyl. "Electric Feel" was released to radio on July 29, 2008. The song's second video features the Rock-afire Explosion.

== Composition ==
“Electric Feel” is written primarily in a 6/4 time signature, giving it an extended phrasing compared to the typical 4/4 of most pop music.

== Reception ==
"Electric Feel" became MGMT's first Australian ARIA top 50 hit, as well as their first New Zealand RIANZ top 40 hit. In the United States, the song originally peaked at number 20 on the Bubbling Under Hot 100 Singles chart, but reached a new peak of number 14 almost three years after the original peak, due to a resurgence in sales from exposure on The Voice. (The version of "Electric Feel" covered by The Voice contestant, Preston Pohl also debuted at number 21 on the same week) The song was ranked at number five on NME's list of the Best Singles of 2008, and came in at number two on Australia's Triple J Hottest 100 countdown for 2008.

== Track listing ==
7" Single
No.	Title	Length
1.	"Electric Feel"	3:48
2.	"Electric Feel" (Rasta Wigs Remix)	4:15

12" Single
No.	Title	Length
1.	"Electric Feel" (Justice Remix)	5:27
2.	"Electric Feel"	3:48

CD Single
No.	Title	Length
1.	"Electric Feel"	3:48
2.	"Electric Feel" (Justice Remix)	5:27

Radio Edit Promo
No.	Title	Length
1.	"Electric Feel" (Radio edit)	3:37

== Reviews ==
- Manchester Evening News
- Digital Spy
- Yahoo Music UK & Ireland

== Music videos ==
Two videos have been released for this song.

The music video, which was nominated for Best Art Direction at the 2008 MTV Video Music Awards, is often described as an ecstasy or acid trip, while some argue it as being a depiction of Sodom and Gomorrah. Pitchfork Media described the video as "a krazy, kandy-kolored, loud neon thingamajig video."

Another music video features an appearance by The Rock-afire Explosion. The Rock-afire Explosion was an animatronic animal band that played in Showbiz Pizza Place and Circus Pizza in the 1980s and 1990s. In the beginning of the video, two individuals with white and black painted faces can be seen stirring a pot, and later in the video dancing. These are Abby Fuller and Rafael Pulido, who starred in Jon Salmon's amateur music video, dancing and singing along to MGMT's "Kids".

The video depicts the band members and various people, cartoon characters, The Rock-afire Explosion, and animal-people partying in the middle of the Tikal jungle. They take the Moon from the sky, cut it open, and paint themselves in a neon ooze emitting from it. They then put it back in the sky. During the closing sequence, the members of MGMT get on motorbikes (late 1970s Honda CB400Ts) and drive into the Moon, which then explodes, causing a rain of neon colors to fall on the dancing people.

The YouTube video has received over 150 million views.

== Charts ==
=== Weekly charts ===
Weekly chart performance for "Electric Feel"
Chart (2008–13)	Peak position
Australia (ARIA)	7
Australia Club Tracks (ARIA) Justice mix	27
Austria (Ö3 Austria Top 40)	60
Belgium (Ultratop 50 Flanders)	17
Canada Hot 100 (Billboard)	53
Canada Rock (Billboard)	43
Germany (GfK)	88
Ireland (IRMA)	21
Netherlands (Single Top 100)	91
New Zealand (Recorded Music NZ)	10
Switzerland Airplay (Schweizer Hitparade)	50
UK Singles (Official Charts)	22
US Bubbling Under Hot 100 (Billboard)	14

=== Year-end charts ===
Year-end chart performance for "Electric Feel"
Chart (2008)	Position
Australia (ARIA)	34
New Zealand (RIANZ)	44
UK Singles (OCC)	171

== Certifications ==
Certifications for "Electric Feel"
Region	Certification	Certified units/sales
Australia (ARIA)	Platinum	70,000^{^}
Canada (Music Canada)	2× Platinum	160,000^{‡}
Denmark (IFPI Danmark)	Platinum	90,000^{‡}
New Zealand (RMNZ)	6× Platinum	180,000^{‡}
United Kingdom (BPI)	2× Platinum	1,200,000^{‡}
United States (RIAA)	6× Platinum	6,000,000^{‡}
^{^} Shipments figures based on certification alone.^{‡} Sales+streaming figures based on certification alone.

== Covers and remixes ==
- The official remix features former Columbia Records label mate Jim Jones. It was supposed to be featured on his fourth album Pray IV Reign but was cut. In an interview with GQ.com Jim Jones explained how the remix came to be

“They did a show [at United Palace Theater] up in Washington Heights; the initial conversation was just that it was an honor to meet them, I think they're kinda cool and… from there, it led into me saying, It'd be crazy if I remixed "Electric Feel". They were like, ‘Yeah, that would be crazy,’ so I said, ‘Let me get the beats and shit.’”

- Katy Perry covered the song in her BBC Radio 1 Live Lounge session in September 2008. Perry's cover was included in the tracklist of the Australian tour edition of her album One of the Boys and her The Hello Katy Australian Tour EP.
- The French electronic duo Justice remixed the song in 2008. The remix won a Grammy Award for Best Remixed Recording, Non-Classical in 2009.
- It was covered for Triple J's "Like A Version" by Jen Cloher & Jordie Lane. Featured on the album Like a Version Volume 6, Track 11.
- Elements of the song were incorporated to Beyoncé's "Single Ladies (Put a Ring on It)" during the series of shows held in Las Vegas "I Am... Yours".
- Instrumental breakdowns of the song were used as the backdrop of Frank Ocean's "Nature Feels" off of his mixtape Nostalgia, Ultra.
- A cover of the song also appeared on the deluxe edition of Turbowolf's 2012 self-titled album.
- Tash Sultana covered the song for Triple J's "Like A Version" in 2017. The cover was voted 78 in the Triple J Hottest 100 of 2017.
- Coast Modern released a cover of the song in 2018.
- Henry Green released an acoustic cover of this song. Norwegian musician and DJ, Kygo, also remixed this specific cover to his signature Tropical house style.
- Nipsey Hussle incorporated instrumentals of the song on the 12th track, "Call from the Bank" (featuring MGMT) off of his 2010 release, The Marathon.

== Media usage ==
- This track was used in the Spring 2009 Ready-to-Wear show for Christian Dior in September 2008.
- Appears on season 2, episode 4 of Gossip Girl
- The track appears on the episode "Prey" of CSI: NY
- This song was featured in the animated television series American Dad! episode "Son of Stan".
- The track was the opening song of As pegadoras (Multishow – Globo), a Brazilian TV program in 2008–2009.
- The Justice remix was also used in Rockstar Games' 2008 video game, Midnight Club: Los Angeles.
- The track was included in the soundtrack for the 2K Sports video game NBA 2K10 released in October 2009.
- The song was used on 2009 video game Tony Hawk: Ride
- Five used the song as part of their interludes during Europa League (formerly UEFA Cup) coverage.
- Former San Francisco Giants starting pitcher, Tim Lincecum, has used "Electric Feel" as his warm-up music before every game.
- Former San Francisco Giants closing pitcher Brian Wilson on his reality show, Life of Brian, claimed the song to be his summer hit of 2009.
- Australian news show Sunrise used this song as its main opener since January 2010, but by October 2011 the theme was dropped in favor of the original (Reach Up for The) Sunrise theme first adopted in 2004.
- The track was used in the BBC documentary The Foods That Make Billions – The Age of Plenty.
- The instrumental for this track was used regularly by the British broadcaster ITV as part of their coverage of the UEFA 2024 Men's European Football Championships (Finals).
- The song is featured on the fictional Flash FM pop radio station in the 2026 video game Grand Theft Auto VI.
