= MGMT =

American rock band

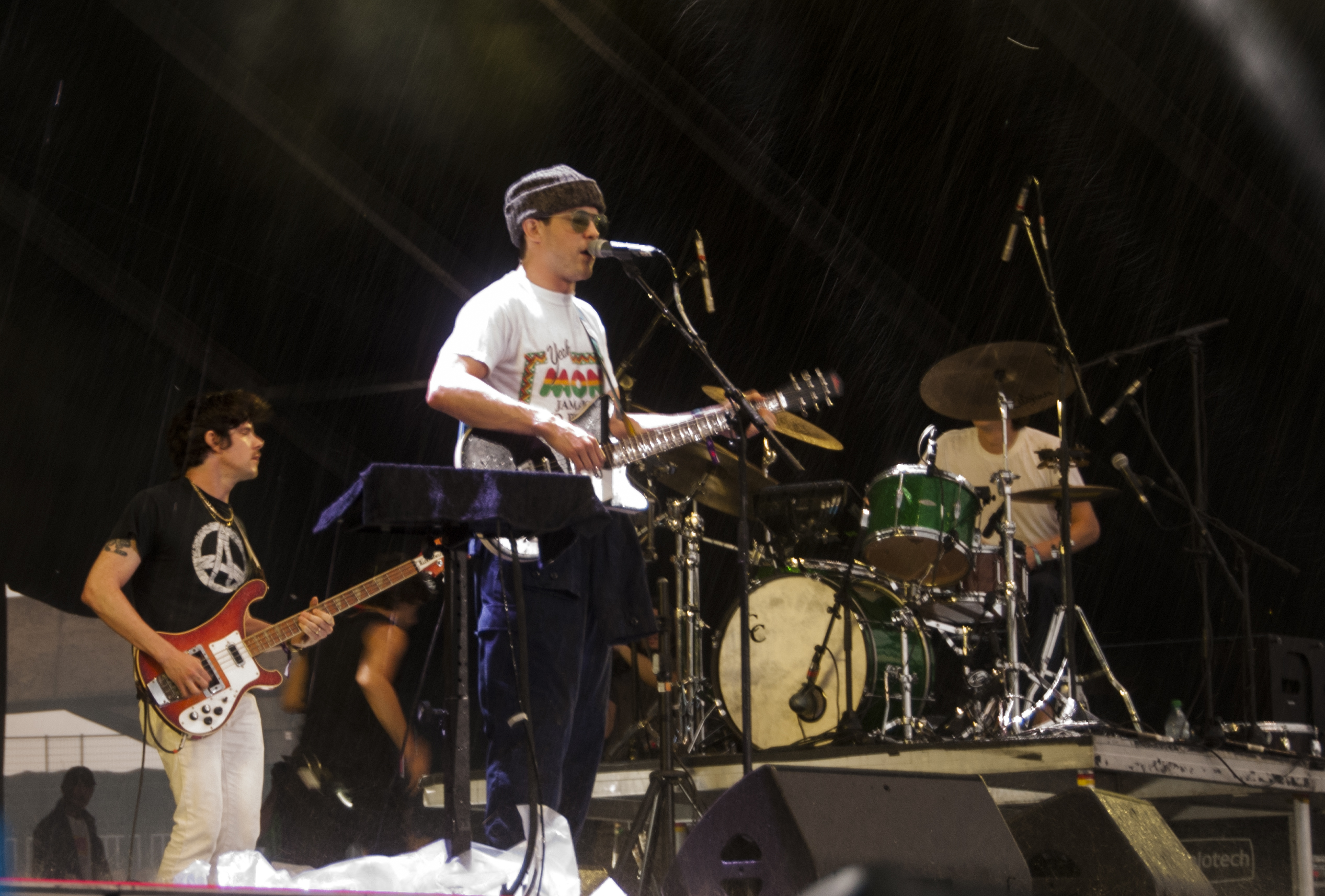
- MGMT performing at the 2017 Osheaga Festival

Background information
- Also known as: The Management (2002–2005)
- Origin: Middletown, Connecticut, U.S.
- Genres: Indie pop; synth-pop; psychedelic pop; indie rock; psychedelic rock; neo-psychedelia; electronic rock
- Years active: 2002–present
- Labels: Cantora; Columbia; RED; Mom + Pop; BMG
- Members: Andrew VanWyngarden; Ben Goldwasser
- Website: whoismgmt.com

MGMT (/ɛm-dʒi-ɛm-tiː/) is an American rock band formed in 2002 in Middletown, Connecticut. The group consists of Andrew VanWyngarden and Ben Goldwasser, and was originally known as the Management before rebranding as MGMT in 2005. Both members are composers and multi-instrumentalists, while VanWyngarden is the group's lead vocalist and lyricist.

MGMT was formed while its members were attending Wesleyan University. Originally signed to Cantora Records by the label's co-founder, New York University undergraduate Will Griggs, MGMT later signed with Columbia and RED Ink in 2006 and released their debut album Oracular Spectacular the next year. Oracular Spectacular was supported by three successful singles: "Time to Pretend", "Electric Feel", and "Kids". At the 51st Grammy Awards, the Justice remix of "Electric Feel" won the Grammy Award for Best Remixed Recording, Non-Classical. The group was nominated for the Grammy Award for Best New Artist and "Kids" was nominated for Best Pop Performance by a Duo or Group with Vocals at the 52nd Grammy Awards. They soon released "Pursuit of Happiness", a collaboration with Kid Cudi and Ratatat, which was notably remixed by Steve Aoki.

After the release of Oracular Spectacular, James Richardson, Will Berman and Matthew Asti joined the core band in the studio for Congratulations, which was released on April 13, 2010. In January 2011, they began work on their eponymous third studio album. It was released in September 2013. The group's fourth studio album, titled Little Dark Age, was released in 2018 and marked the end of their contract with Columbia. In 2024, the band released their fifth studio album Loss of Life.

== History ==
=== Formation (2002–2005) ===
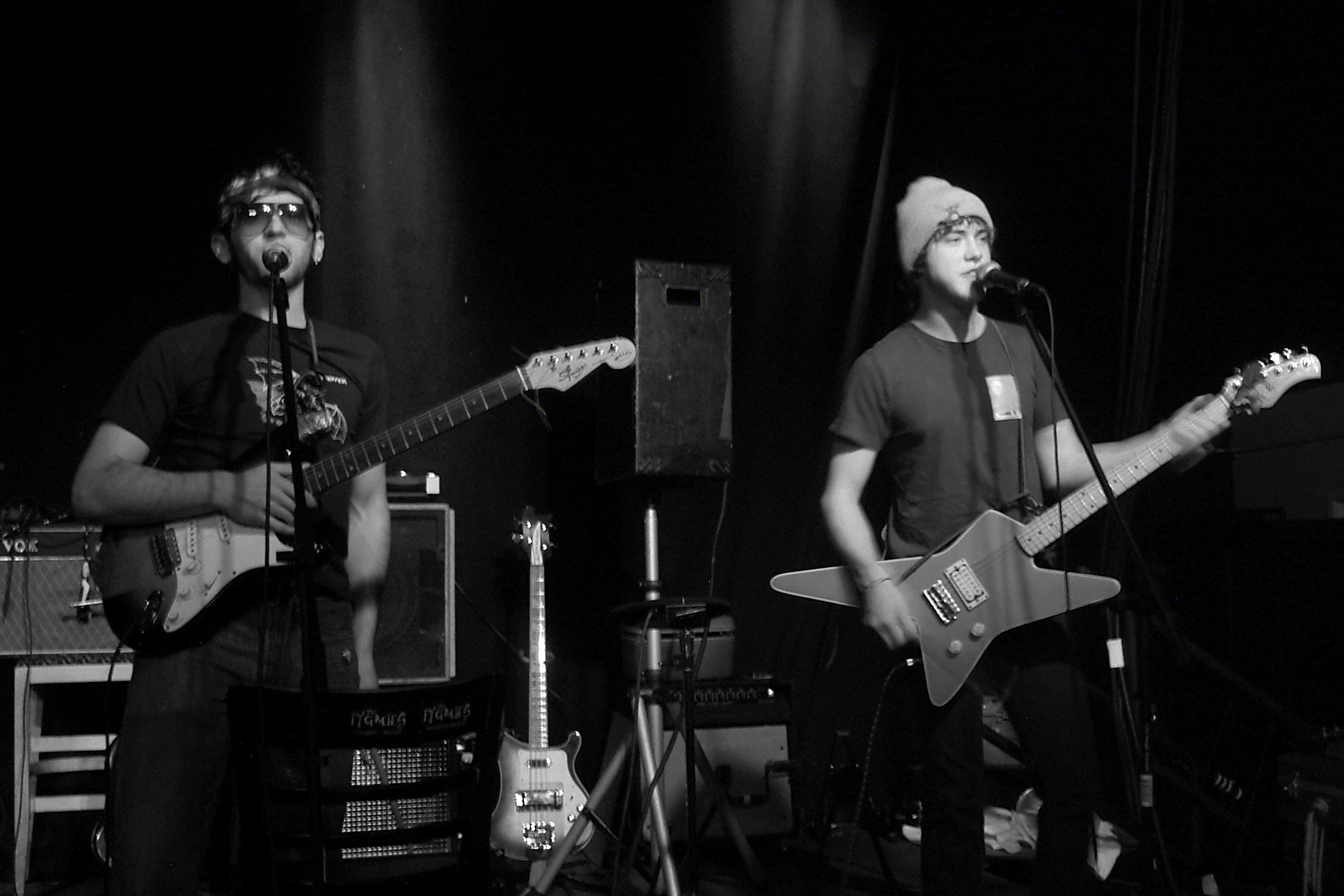
MGMT, with members Ben Goldwasser and Andrew VanWyngarden, in 2005

Ben Goldwasser and Andrew VanWyngarden formed the band while attending Wesleyan University during their freshman year. "We weren't trying to start a band, we were just hanging out and showing each other music that we liked." Goldwasser remarked about this in 2007. They experimented with noise rock and electronica before settling on what Paco Alvarez of Spin calls "their current brand of shape-shifting psychedelic pop". In 2002, the duo attended the inaugural Bonnaroo together as fans. The band formed under the name The Management and released two demo albums, We (Don't) Care and Climbing to New Lows, under that name; but since the name was already being used by another band, they later changed it to MGMT, an abbreviation of the original band name. While at Wesleyan, they were schoolmates of Francis and the Lights, with whom they have since toured. VanWyngarden and Goldwasser graduated in 2005 and toured extensively in support of the Time to Pretend EP released in the same year, opening for indie pop band of Montreal.

=== Oracular Spectacular (2006–2009) ===
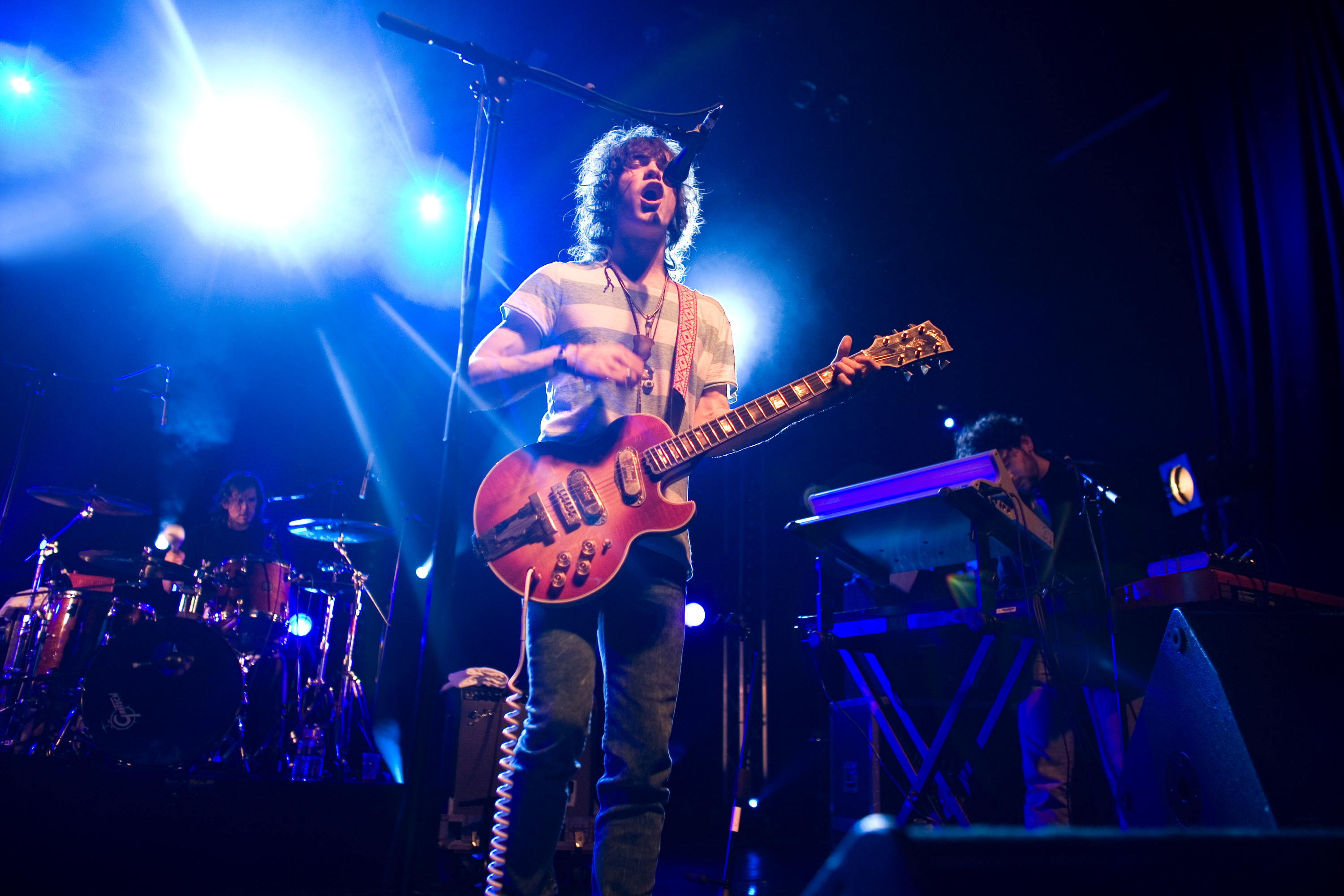
MGMT performing at La Route du Rock 2008

In the autumn of 2006, Maureen Kenny signed the band to Columbia Records. When the band received a call from the A&R department of Columbia Records saying they were interested in their music, they thought it was a joke. The duo recorded with Flaming Lips/Sleater-Kinney music producer Dave Fridmann in 2007 for their major label debut, Oracular Spectacular. MGMT opened for Of Montreal on tour in autumn 2007 as a five-piece touring band including Matthew Asti (bass), James Richardson (drums), and Hank Sullivant (guitar). In November 2007, they performed for the first time in Europe, supporting the band Samantha and The Courteeners at Koko in London, England. After March 2008, Hank Sullivant left the band to pursue his own band, Kuroma. Will Berman joined as the new drummer, James Richardson switched from drums to guitar, and Matthew Asti remained on bass.

In June 2008 the band supported Radiohead on the Manchester date of their world tour and went on a headline tour of the UK during November 2008, playing at venues such as Manchester Academy and Shepherd's Bush Empire. MGMT opened for M.I.A. on the Vassar College date of her 2008 tour, and also played several shows with Beck during his 2008 tour. They appeared at the 2008 and 2009 editions of the Bonnaroo Music Festival. Bruce Springsteen was in attendance during their 2009 Bonnaroo late-night set, which followed his headlining appearance on What Stage. They also toured Australia with a headlining spot on the Meredith Music Festival line-up. The group played a show at the Virgin Music Festival on the Toronto Islands on September 6, 2008, playing nine songs off their Oracular Spectacular album. They also played the 2008 Street Scene festival in San Diego, California. On February 27, 2009, MGMT performed alongside Spectrum at The Dome in Finsbury Park. MGMT also played another show in Australia at the 2009 Splendour in the Grass Festival. They headlined this music festival along with other well known bands such as Bloc Party, The Flaming Lips, Happy Mondays, and Jane's Addiction. MGMT opened for Paul McCartney, an admitted fan, at Fenway Park in Boston, Massachusetts, on August 5 and 6, 2009. On August 15, 2009, MGMT played in Hamburg, Germany, at the Dockville Festival and performed several songs from their upcoming album. MGMT was one of the headlining bands for the Treasure Island Music Festival on Treasure Island in San Francisco, California, on October 17, 2009.

=== Congratulations (2010–2011) ===
MGMT's Congratulations was released on April 13, 2010. The band, including Matthew Asti, James Richardson, and Will Berman from the live band, spent the summer of 2009 in Malibu, California, recording the album with Pete Kember (a.k.a. Sonic Boom), formerly of Spacemen 3 and Spectrum, serving as producer/guru, and long-time friend Billy Bennett (also an NCAA record-holding kicker for the University of Georgia), as engineer. MGMT originally suggested that they might not release any singles from the album. By July 2010, however, four single releases from the album had been confirmed. The album cover art for Congratulations was created for MGMT by Anthony Ausgang and the overall design of the packaging is by Josh Cheuse of Sony Entertainment. On March 9, 2010, MGMT released the song "Flash Delirium" for free download on their official website. On March 20, the band allowed users to stream their new album from their website.

MGMT started their Congratulations Tour on April 12, 2010, in San Francisco, California, at The Fillmore. They performed on April 23 at Brown University's Spring Weekend; on April 27 at Yale University's Spring Fling; on April 30 at the University of New Hampshire's Spring Climax; and on May 1 at Fordham University's Spring Weekend. They performed on Saturday Night Live on April 24, 2010, and on the Late Show with David Letterman on May 12 to promote their new album, and on June 11, MGMT played their largest headlining show anywhere in the world with a sold-out, 9,500 capacity gig at the Red Rocks Amphitheatre in Morrison, Colorado. On June 25, MGMT performed on Late Night with Jimmy Fallon, and on July 23, they were the musical guests on The Late Late Show with Craig Ferguson.

On August 25, MGMT released a music video for "Congratulations", the third video of their second album. MGMT was one of the third tier bands for the 2010 Coachella Festival in Indio, California. The event draws nearly 120,000 attendees annually. On October 31, 2010, the band performed for the Voodoo Experience in New Orleans, Louisiana. The band decided to dress as the main characters from Scooby-Doo for Halloween; Andrew dressed up as Daphne and Ben dressed up as Velma. They headlined at Fun Fun Fun Fest which was held at Waterloo Park in Austin, Texas, on November 6, 2010. The performance was the last show in the US for MGMT in 2010. Their first 2011 gig was at Mar del Plata, Argentina, in front of a crowd of more than 40,000 on the beach in a free event which they headlined. MGMT began their first Asian tour on February 22, 2011. On September 22, 2011, MGMT performed the Pink Floyd song "Lucifer Sam" during Late Night with Jimmy Fallon's "Pink Floyd Week".

=== MGMT (2011–2014) ===
In January 2012, MGMT confirmed in an interview with Intercourse Magazine that they had started work on their third album, with VanWyngarden stating that he had written five songs. On February 27, 2012, MGMT began recording the album with Dave Fridmann at his Tarbox Road Studios. In March 2012, VanWyngarden said that MGMT will perform new songs on their upcoming shows in Latin America. On March 30, 2012, the band premiered a new song, entitled "Alien Days", at a show in Bogotá, Colombia. The band performed on August 3, 2012, in Montreal, Quebec, Canada at Osheaga, and on August 5, 2012, in Bethlehem, Pennsylvania at Musikfest. In January 2013, NME and Rolling Stone published an interview in which the band announced that the album was tentatively scheduled for a June 2013 release. As of March 2013, the process of recording the album at Tarbox Road Studios with Fridmann was near completion.

On April 20, 2013, the band released the studio version of "Alien Days". The band then embarked on a spring tour, followed by fall/autumn and winter tour dates for North America. Following VanWyngarden's shoulder surgery in mid-2013, former touring member Hank Sullivant rejoined the band to play live guitar for the remainder of 2013. Sullivant played with VanWyngarden when they were in high school and is in the band Kuroma, whose next album is produced by Goldwasser. The self-titled album was released September 17, 2013. An exclusive early release of the album, along with a full-length music video called "Optimizer", was available from the Rdio music service on September 9, 2013. In June 2013, the band performed at the FireFly Music Festival in Dover, Delaware. They performed at the Coachella Valley Music and Arts Festival in April 2014 before embarking on a European tour later in June 2014 and performing at the Glastonbury Festival in England. In July 2014, they were nominated for a VMA in the category "Best Editing" for their music video "Your Life is a Lie". After wrapping up touring behind their self-titled album, Goldwasser relocated to LA. In an interview at Falls Festival Marion Bay in 2014, the band announced that they would take a short break and come back stronger with a new sound.

=== Little Dark Age (2015–2019) ===
Will Berman stated in an interview with HitFix in April 2015 that "We've been taking a little break I guess. We've been at it for years at this point. There's more to come." He didn't want to speak for either Ben or Andrew on when there would be a new album from the group. On December 26, 2015, the band tweeted announcing that they would return in 2016. The band began working on an untitled new album in October 2016. On May 8, 2017, the band released a teaser video on Instagram alongside the title of the forthcoming album as Little Dark Age, following a series of cryptic tweets the week prior. On June 21, the band revealed that their next album had been mastered. On October 17, the band released "Little Dark Age", the title track from their new album and their first single in four years. "When You Die" was released as the second single on December 12, 2017. The third single from the record, "Hand It Over", was released on January 5, 2018.

Rolling Stone magazine published on January 25, 2018, an interview with MGMT regarding their fourth album Little Dark Age. MGMT admitted that their two previous albums were so poorly received that they thought they could never have reached peak popularity as they had with the release of their first album. Since their separation, the two core members began working long distances on the album via e-mail. Little Dark Age was in part shaped by this unique, distanced relationship between the two musicians, who later decided to meet and jointly work together again.

The band has explained that Little Dark Age is both an expression of surprise and dismay to the current political and social climate—particularly the election of Donald Trump as President of the United States—with an occasional reference to their personal lives. Of the election, VanWyngarden stated, "We were like, 'Wow, is it actually possible for the most impossible thing to happen?' [...] Apparently, we were more inspired to write pop music after evil took over the world." Touring guitarist James Richardson also provided inspiration, which resulted in the song 'James' being dedicated to celebrating the band's friendship. The album was released on February 9, 2018, and followed with a North American tour, part of the Little Dark Age Tour.

=== Label changes and Loss of Life (2019–present) ===
On November 22, 2019, the band performed a new song titled "In the Afternoon" in Las Vegas, Nevada. On December 10, a teaser for the studio version of the song was posted on the band's Instagram page. On December 11, "In the Afternoon" was officially released as a single alongside a music video created by the band. The release marks their first after departing from Columbia Records and the first on their independent label, MGMT Records. On March 20, 2020, the band released another new song, titled "As You Move Through the World". In June 2021, the band released a statement on Twitter and Instagram hinting that they were working on new music.

On November 11, 2022, the band released their 2011 performance at the Guggenheim Museum as a live album titled 11•11•11 exactly 11 years after being performed. On January 17, 2023, MGMT announced they will release another album in 2023 and return to touring after nearly four years. A photo shared by VanWyngarden on September 21 included the words "elf of soils", which was interpreted as an anagram for Loss of Life. On May 13, 2023, MGMT played a special set at Just Like Heaven festival in Pasadena, CA for the 15th anniversary of Oracular Spectacular. The band performed the entire album beginning to end, incorporating elaborate props, new arrangements for several of the songs and a couple interlude skits centered around the history of the band.

On October 24, 2023, attendees at Pitchblack Playback's album listening session in the dark at Riverside Studios in London for Oracular Spectacular and Little Dark Age were given a free flexidisc known as Bubblegum Dog, featuring a cryptic spoken word monologue which fans on Reddit speculated hints at new music and referenced an unreleased track whose title was seen on a whiteboard in the background of an image the band released during the making of Little Dark Age.

On October 31, 2023, MGMT released the first single from their fifth studio album Loss of Life titled "Mother Nature". This release coincided with the band confirming the title of the album, revealing the track list, and confirming the final release date of the album. On November 29, the band released the album's second single "Bubblegum Dog", which does not include the monologue featured on the flexidisk given by the band in October. "Nothing to Declare", the third single from the album, was released on January 10, 2024. On February 20, MGMT released the album's fourth single, "Dancing in Babylon" featuring Christine and the Queens.

On November 10, 2025, MGMT entered the studio with producer Dave Fridmann to begin work on their sixth album.

== Musical style and influences ==
MGMT's musical style has been characterized as a range of pop and rock genres, including indie pop, synth-pop, psychedelic pop, indie rock, psychedelic rock, neo-psychedelia, and electronic rock. Paco Alvarez of Spin described their sound as a "brand of shape-shifting psychedelic pop" and Gavin Haynes of the Guardian describes MGMT as being "between pop and experimental". VanWyngarden named Talking Heads and OMD as artists who are "definitely in [their] blood". MGMT regularly covered a Magazine song "Burst" when touring in 2011, and recorded a version of Fleetwood Mac's "Future Games" for the tribute album Just Tell Me That You Want Me: A Tribute to Fleetwood Mac (2012).

== Legal issues ==
In January 2009, MGMT demanded compensation from the French Union for a Popular Movement (UMP) Party. The UMP, headed by then-President of France Nicolas Sarkozy, had used the song "Kids" without permission at a party conference and in two online videos in 2008. In an official statement, MGMT remarked that "the fact that the UMP used our song without permission while simultaneously pushing anti-piracy legislation seemed a little wack." The UMP initially offered a symbolic compensation of €1 to MGMT, but the band refused that offer. In April 2009, the parties settled out of court, and the UMP agreed to pay MGMT around €2,500 for legal fees and €30,000 (US$39,050) for copyright infringement. MGMT donated this money to artists' rights organizations.

== Collaborations ==
They have collaborated with rapper Kid Cudi, and are featured on the single "Pursuit of Happiness" from his album Man on the Moon: The End of Day. For the 2010 MTV VMAs, Kid Cudi was nominated for Best Hip-Hop video for "Pursuit of Happiness". They also collaborated on the track "Worm Mountain" on The Flaming Lips' Embryonic.

On September 4, 2009, Beck announced his second Record Club covers album, Songs of Leonard Cohen. MGMT contributed, alongside Devendra Banhart, Andrew Stockdale of Wolfmother and Binki Shapiro of Little Joy.

During the production of Congratulations in 2009, VanWyngarden and Goldwasser met with Lou Reed, the former lead singer and guitarist of The Velvet Underground, about contributing vocals to "Lady Dada's Nightmare". VanWyngarden recalls, "he pretty much said it didn't need it. And then he also talked about how we didn't need managers."

In 2010, they provided guest vocals on "Call from the Bank" on rapper Nipsey Hussle's mixtape The Marathon, which would be their last collaborative effort for ten years until 2020, when they contributed vocals to "The Divine Chord" and "Solitary Ceremonies" alongside guitar work by Johnny Marr on electronic group The Avalanches' third studio album We Will Always Love You.

== Band members ==
=== Official members ===
- Andrew VanWyngarden – lead vocals, lead and rhythm guitars, keyboards, bass guitar, drums, percussion (2002–present)
- Ben Goldwasser – keyboards, sampling, rhythm guitar, percussion, vocals (2002–present)

=== Current touring members ===
- Will Berman – drums, percussion (2005, 2008–present), harmonica, backing vocals (2008–present)
- James Richardson – lead guitar, keyboards, backing vocals (2008–present), drums (2007–2008)
- Simon O’Connor – bass guitar, backing vocals (2017–present)

=== Former touring members ===
- Matthew Asti – bass guitar, backing vocals (2007–2017)
- Hank Sullivant – lead guitar, keyboards, backing vocals (2007–2008; 2013–2014)

== Discography ==
Studio albums

- Oracular Spectacular (2007)
- Congratulations (2010)
- MGMT (2013)
- Little Dark Age (2018)
- Loss of Life (2024)
