= Tarot Classics =

EP by Surfer Blood
- Released: October 25, 2011
- Genre: Indie rock
- Length: 23:17
- Label: Kanine
- Producer: Surfer Blood

Surfer Blood chronology
Astro Coast (2010)	Tarot Classics (2011)	Pythons (2013)

Singles from Tarot Classics
- 1. "Miranda" Released: August 30, 2011

Tarot Classics is an EP by Florida-based indie rock band Surfer Blood released on October 25, 2011, on Kanine Records. It is their last release for Kanine.

== Reception ==
Professional ratings
Aggregate scores
Source	Rating
Metacritic	77/100
Review scores
Source	Rating
AbsolutePunk	85%
AllMusic	3.5/5 stars
Consequence of Sound	4/5 stars
One Thirty BPM	76%
Paste	7.5/10
Pitchfork	7.2/10
PopMatters	6/10 stars
Robert Christgau	(2-star Honorable Mention)

Tarot Classics received generally favorable reviews from music critics.

== Track listing ==
All songs written by John Paul Pitts, Thomas Fekete, Tyler Schwarz and Kevin Williams, except as noted.

1. I'm Not Ready (John Paul Pitts, Thomas Fekete, Tyler Schwarz)
2. Miranda
3. Voyager Reprise
4. Drinking Problem
5. Voyager Reprise (Another Summer of Love Remix)
6. Drinking Problem (Speculator Remix)

== Charts ==
Chart performance for Tarot Classics
Chart (2011)	Peak position
US Independent Albums (Billboard)	46
US Heatseekers Albums (Billboard)	5
US Top Rock Albums (Billboard)	48
