= Power Gig: Rise of the SixString =

2010 video game

- Cover art
- Developer: Seven45 Studios
- Publisher: Seven45 Studios
- Engine: Vision
- Platforms: PlayStation 3, Xbox 360
- Release: NA: October 18, 2010
- Genre: Rhythm
- Mode: Single-player

Power Gig: Rise of the SixString is a rhythm game developed and published by Seven45 Studios, a subsidiary of musical instrument manufacturer First Act. Unveiled at the 2010 Game Developers Conference, it was released for PlayStation 3 and Xbox 360 on October 18, 2010.

Similar to the Guitar Hero and Rock Band franchises, the game allows players to play songs using instrument controllers that mimic the lead guitar, drums, and vocals. The game was distinguished from its competitors by shipping with an actual electric guitar that could be used with the game and as a standalone instrument (as opposed to a simplified plastic analog), and by offering an "AirStrike" drum controller with floor-mounted sensors for air drumming, as opposed to a physical drumkit. The game is also compatible with standard guitar and drum controllers. Promotion for Power Gig also focused on the inclusion of songs from several artists that had never appeared in other music games before, including Eric Clapton, who endorsed the game due to their objections to the simplified interpretation of guitar playing used in Guitar Hero and Rock Band.

Power Gig received negative reviews. Criticism was directed primarily towards the quality of the bundled guitar, and that besides a mode that added power chords to songs, the game otherwise played identically to its competitors, with no other features or lessons designed specifically around realistic guitar play (in comparison to its main competitor on launch, Rock Band 3). The game's pad-free drum controller was criticized for its poor hit detection and lacking physical feedback due to its design, while the premise of the game's career storyline was also panned.

== Gameplay ==
Power Gig plays similarly to other guitar-based games, with a note display divided into five colored lanes corresponding to different frets. The game ships with a 2/3 scale six-string electric guitar, designed to be usable with Power Gig and other games in a similar fashion to a standard guitar controller. The edge of its fretboard contains colored markings corresponding to in-game notes. In the game's basic mode, the player must hold down any string(s) in the colored fret areas that match the displayed note patterns on-screen and then strum the strings in time. In the game's "Power Chord" mode, the colored notes on-screen are replaced with colored numbers from 1 to 6, representing which string(s) must be held down in the colored fret area to make a chord, accompanied by strumming. While the guitar can detect every string and fret pressed, the gameplay is only designed to work with basic two-note chord intervals. It is possible to use the guitar controller separately as a standalone electric guitar by removing a dampener that is placed on the strings during gameplay to keep them from ringing out. Power Gig supports up to three players in a band, consisting of a guitarist, drummer, and vocalist; the game is compatible with guitars and drums that were designed for the Guitar Hero or Rock Band franchises.

A drum controller known as the "AirStrike" was also developed for the game; unlike other drum controllers, it consists of an array of motion sensors placed on the ground in front of the player to detect the motion of a player's air drumming, rather than using physical drum pads. Seven45 promoted that the controller provided a quieter and "much more real and authentic" experience than other drum controllers with physical pads.

=== Story ===
The game's story mode, Unite the Clans, is centered on the world of Ohm, where music has special properties and public performances are banned by the tyrannical Martin Rothchild, the "Headliner". Three rebel clans oppose the Headliner and his order: the RiffRiders, a loosely organized clan that just loves to jam more than anything else, the Rise, an upstart clan who bucks tradition, and the Zehn, a mysterious and transcendental clan, focused on the self as the end-all be-all power in the universe. Each character has unique a "Mojo Power" (equivalent to the "Star Power" mechanic of Guitar Hero), which affects the band's score in different ways.

== Soundtrack ==
The game features a setlist comparable in size to that of Guitar Hero and Rock Band games, and is made up of only master recordings; the company released a limited amount of downloadable content after the game's release. Seven45 Studios claims that because Power Gig is closer to playing a real guitar compared to other rhythm games (with only Rock Band 3's "Pro Mode" being more realistic), they have been able to attract artists that have otherwise shied away from the genre believing that the simplified note-matching mechanic is not equivalent to learning how to play a real instrument. The game includes music from Eric Clapton, Dave Matthews Band, and Kid Rock, who each have signed exclusive licenses with Seven45 Studios. Both Dave Matthews and Kid Rock stated they felt that Power Gig was a superior game compared to previous music games as they move past the simple button-pressing mechanic; furthermore, the game "puts a real guitar into the hands of aspiring musicians", according to Matthews.

The songs that are included in Power Gig are as follows:

Song	Artist
"A.V.H."	Ozzy Osbourne
"Again"	Flyleaf
"Alive"	P.O.D.
"All Summer Long"	Kid Rock
"Artifacts of Sound"	So Many Dynamos
"Aspartame"	Superdrag
"Awake"	Godsmack
"Been Caught Stealing"	Jane's Addiction
"Blood on My Hands"	The Used
"Blurry"	Puddle of Mudd
"Bombtrack"	Rage Against the Machine
"Break"	Three Days Grace
"Breath"	Breaking Benjamin
"Camera Shy"	School Boy Humor
"Chaos"	Mutemath
"Cherub Rock"	Smashing Pumpkins
"Chivaree"	Channels
"Comfortably Confused"	I See Stars
"Couldn't Stand the Weather"	Stevie Ray Vaughan
"Crack the Skye"	Mastodon
"Crossroads"	John Mayer
"Cult of Personality"	Living Colour
"The Devil Cried"	Black Sabbath
"Don't Start Believing"	The Fatal Flaw
"Everything"	A Cursive Memory
"Fall Behind Me"	The Donnas
"Funny The Way It Is"	Dave Matthews Band
"Hands Open"	Snow Patrol
"Head Up High"	Firewind
"Headfirst in the River"	Envy on the Coast
"His Girl Friday"	The Academy Is...
"Hold On"	Korn
"The Hollow"	A Perfect Circle
"Hotel of Infidels"	The Paris Riots
"I Know"	The Willowz
"I Want to Conquer the World"	Bad Religion
"Ignorance"	Paramore
"Innocent Man"	A Love Like Pi
"Lay Down Sally"	Eric Clapton
"Layla"	Eric Clapton
"Let It Rain"	Eric Clapton
"Listen to Your Friends"	New Found Glory
"Martyr Me"	The Get Up Kids
"New Orleans Is Sinking"	The Tragically Hip
"The Night"	Disturbed
"No Such Thing"	John Mayer
"Paper Wings"	Rise Against
"Platinum Blonde Life"	No Doubt
"Plush"	Stone Temple Pilots
"Readers & Writers"	Idlewild
"Retribution"	Black Label Society
"Rock n Roll Jesus"	Kid Rock
"She's A Genius"	Jet
"She's Alchemy"	Hounds Below
"Silvertongue"	Damiera
"Son of Detroit"	Kid Rock
"Spellbound"	Lacuna Coil
"Strange Times"	The Black Keys
"Substitution"	Silversun Pickups
"Swim"	Surfer Blood
"Tick Tick Boom"	The Hives
"Tired of You"	Buckcherry
"Tripping Billies"	Dave Matthews Band
"When They Were Young"	Taxpayer
"Who Did You Think I Was"	John Mayer
"Why I Am"	Dave Matthews Band
"Wish You Were Here"	Incubus
"You Think I Ain't Worth a Dollar, But I Feel Like a Millionaire"	Queens of the Stone Age
"You're Gonna Go Far, Kid"	The Offspring
"You're Going Down"	Sick Puppies

=== Downloadable content ===
Song title	Artist	Pack name
"Beer"^{a}	Reel Big Fish	Alternative Rock Pack
"Dashboard"^{a}	Modest Mouse	Alternative Rock Pack
"The Impression That I Get"^{a}	The Mighty Mighty Bosstones	Alternative Rock Pack
"Hash Pipe"^{a}	Weezer	Weezer Pack
"Perfect Situation"^{a}	Weezer	Weezer Pack
"Surf Wax America"^{a}	Weezer	Weezer Pack

^aSong is no longer available for purchase.

Two other unreleased DLC songs have also been located through the use of game files. Those being Megadeth's "Tornado Of Souls", and Rob Zombie's "Superbeast", the latter of which is unable to be played in-game.

== Reception ==
Reception

Aggregate scores
Aggregator	Score
GameRankings	42.35%
Metacritic	36/100

Review scores
Publication	Score
GamePro	1/5
IGN	4/10

Power Gig: Rise of the SixString received mostly negative reviews. It holds an aggregate score of 36/100 on Metacritic, indicating a "generally negative" reception.

The game was primarily criticized for not including sufficient in-game functionality built around its guitar peripheral; Ars Technica pointed out that beyond a mode that adds power chords to sections of songs, Power Gig otherwise played identically to Guitar Hero and Rock Band (with note patterns that did not accurately reflect how a song would be played on an actual guitar), and made little effort in providing any education on the instrument's fundamentals (in contrast to Rock Band 3, which offered similar "Pro Guitar" accessories and modes with more realistic gameplay, and in-game lessons). Similarly, Griffin McElroy of Joystiq referred to Power Gig as "a dumbfounding product" that "settles for using a new toy to manipulate an old game—but still manages to categorically fail at both". As a standalone instrument, McElroy stated that the bundled guitar "plays about as well as you'd expect a $180 guitar to play. Which is to say, not well at all". GamesRadar also criticized the AirStrike drum controller for having poor hit detection, and requiring "special" drumsticks and 6 AA batteries in order to function.

IGN acknowledged that Power Gig only made a "basic and rudimentary attempt to teach players about the strings of a guitar", and also criticized the "laughably bad" premise of its career mode. Giving the game a 4/10, it was argued that "had this actually been a game that was comparable to Rock Band 3's Pro mode, but with a real six string guitar, then I would be thrilled. But instead it's an overpriced, low budget music game with tacked on power chords". Although praising certain features, such as accuracy-based scoring, the presence of open strums on guitar charts (which, in Guitar Hero, were only present on bass), and its soundtrack, GamePro criticized Power Gig for the quality of its guitar, user interface (including using a flat, vertical tablature-like display for notes as opposed to the angled "highway" of Guitar Hero), and story mode.

Giant Bomb criticized Power Gig for not "capitalizing" on its use of a real guitar, not being able to activate Mojo Power on a Rock Band or Guitar Hero guitar by tilting it, a "weirdo fantasy story mode" that spent too much time on the exposition of its universe (and was "corny and self-serious in equal measures"), its "deliberately befuddling" decision to exclude bass as a playable instrument, and that despite the inclusion of artists who had not been on such a game before, its soundtrack for being "100 percent leftovers". Although the reviewer was unable to obtain one, the AirStrike drum controller was also considered to be a "baffling counterpoint" to the game's promotion of realism as a selling point in regards to its guitar, as it lacks the physical feedback that is integral to the instrument. Giant Bomb ultimately named Power Gig the worst video game of 2010, explaining that it was a "bad, lazy take on a style of game already being dominated by two fierce competitors who are more skilled, more experienced, and better funded. It's not just really, really bad, it's unnecessary".

== See also ==
- Rocksmith
- List of video games notable for negative reception
