= Tree Machine Records =

Record label based in Indiana, United States

- Founded: 2010
- Founder: Zack Anselm
- Genre: Indie rock, electronic
- Country of origin: U.S.
- Location: Bloomington, Indiana
- Official website: treemachinerecords.com

Tree Machine Records is an independent record label in Bloomington, Indiana. It was founded in the summer of 2010 by students at Indiana University working to sign new artists and expand Tree Machine's outreach. It follows no specific genre and has connected with artists across the globe. Notable artists include Living Hour, !mindparade, co-manager Eazy, Blimp Rock, Jon Dice, Vows, and Living Body. The first production under the label, was co-signed to Gulcher Records and has since received instant recognition in the underground indie rock world, helping with the founding and early progression of the label.

The label is now co-managed across the Atlantic in both Johannesburg, South Africa, and Bloomington, Indiana in the U.S. The genre focus is mostly eclectic with a balance between diverse indie rock and experimental electronic music.

== Roster ==
- Bartholin – A side project from Drew Danburry and Cat Leavy
- Blimp Rock – Indie/Rock artist from Toronto, Ontario, who plans to host Blimp Rock Festival, a music festival in a blimp.
- Eazy – Music producer/beat maker and DJ from Rustenburg, South Africa, who joined TM and became co-manager following the release of the Black Blood Stains EP.
- Jon Dice – Sample-based electronic from Vermont
- Ladycop – Indie/Electronic/Pop harmonies
- Living Body – Alternative, Experimental Rock
- Living Hour – Indie/Shoegaze/Rock from Winnipeg, Canada
- !mindparade – Psych Rock/Pop locals from Bloomington, IN
- Pony – Experimental Indie Rock from Seoul, South Korea
- Shorebilly – French Indie Rock
- The Psychics – Nashville, Tennessee rock originally from Rio de Janeiro, Brazil
- Shorebilly – Electronic artist from Paris, France
- Vows (band) – New Jersey/Vermont rock band with synth layered dystopia
- Wonderbitch – Founded in Bloomington, native to Austin, Texas
- WOOF. – New Jersey/New York City electronic
- You Are Number Six – New Wave from Montpellier/France

== Previous ==
- Austin Bey – Downtempo, avant-garde, guitar, electronic
- Bonfire John – Indie/Rock/Folk artist from Indianapolis, Indiana. The Band had their first album release, "Making The Most" in 2011 with the formation of the label.
- The Danger O's – Indie/Alternative Rock band from West Chester, PA
- Ender Belongs To Me – Brooklyn-based electronic artist
- Hypocrite in a Hippy Crypt – Psych, acoustic rock
- The Stomping Academy – Pop/Rock ten-piece band from Sweden
- Whitewash – Brooklyn Psych Rock

== Discography ==
"Dead Mystics" (12/20/2015) – !mindparade
"Bad Connection" (10/20/2015) – WOOF.
"Music for Good Ears" (05/25/2015) – EAZY
"Living Hour" (04/23/2015) – Living Hour
"Jon Dice Presents Dubcake: Volume 1" (01/21/2015) – Jon Dice
"A Better Way" (01/01/2015) – Jon Dice
"Black Blood Stains EP" (04/26/2014) – Eazy
"0 EP" (03/27/2014) – Vows
"Vows EP" (03/25/2014) – Vows
"Digital Growth, Digital Decay" (01/08/2014) – Magic MAchine
"Happy Family EP" (09/26/2013) – The Stomping Academy
"Dance Floor Secrets"(07/03/2013) – Eazy
"Nothin' But The Beat" (05/16/13) – Niko Suave
"Eyes of the Streets"(3/25/13) – J.U.
"Tweaker Two"(4/23/13) – Hypocrite in a Hippy Crypt
"One Hungry Acre"(3/27/12) – Hotbreath Tea and the Invisible Branches
"198920" (01/22/12) – Little Timmy McFarland of Flight 19
"Mordecai's Reinvention" (11/11/11) – Magic MAchine
"Making The Most"(7/17/11) – Bonfire John
"Tweaker In The Park"(12/25/10) – Hypocrite in a Hippy Crypt
