= Pythons (album) =

Studio album by Surfer Blood
- Released: June 11, 2013
- Genre: Indie rock, surf rock, power pop, pop punk
- Length: 34:29
- Label: Sire; Warner Brothers Recordings; Kanine
- Producer: Gil Norton

Surfer Blood chronology
Astro Coast (2010)	Pythons (2013)	1000 Palms (2015)

Professional ratings
Aggregate scores
Source	Rating
Metacritic	69/100
Review scores
Source	Rating
Allmusic	3.5/5 stars
Pitchfork Media	(6.7/10)

Pythons is the second studio album by indie rock band Surfer Blood. It was released in June 2013 under Sire Records and produced by Gil Norton. Following the release of their EP, Tarot Classics, Surfer Blood had been writing songs while on tour. The first song to be written for the album is technically "Prom Song", as they had the guitar parts for this song for a few years. The album features all the qualities that define Surfer Blood's sound, but is stripped of its reverb and given a more polished production, as opposed to the production that took place in front-man John Paul Pitts' apartment. Pixies guitarist Joey Santiago lent the band equipment such as amplifiers and guitars during the album's production, as Norton is a close friend of his because he produced most of the Pixies discography.

== Track listing ==
No.	Title	Length
1.	"Demon Dance"	3:14
2.	"Gravity"	2:47
3.	"Weird Shapes"	3:30
4.	"I Was Wrong"	3:37
5.	"Squeezing Blood"	3:15
6.	"Say Yes to Me"	2:54
7.	"Blair Witch"	3:13
8.	"Needles and Pins"	3:41
9.	"Slow Six"	4:25
10.	"Prom Song"	3:53

Pythons (Deluxe Version)
No.	Title	Length
11.	"Bird 4 U"	2:56
12.	"Phantom Limb"	3:09

== Personnel ==
- John Paul Pitts - vocals, guitar
- Thomas Fekete - guitar, vocals
- Kevin Williams - bass, keyboards, vocals
- Tyler Schwarz - drums
- Gil Norton - producer
- Dan Austin - engineer, programming
- Brian Gardner - mastering
- Rob Schnapf - mixing
- Chris Szczech - mixing assistant
- Brendan Dekora - assistant engineer
- Jeff Sosnow - A&R
- Alex Black - A&R
- Julia Pitts - photography
- Frank Maddocks - art direction, photography
- Esteban Neumann - illustrations
