= Rogers Drums =

Multinational drum manufacturer

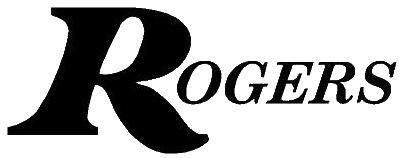
- Company type: Private
- Industry: Musical instruments
- Founded: 1849; 177 years ago in Farmingdale, NJ
- Founder: Joseph Rogers
- Fate: Merged to Yamaha Corporation
- Headquarters: Covington, Ohio, U.S.
- Area served: Worldwide
- Products: Drum kits
- Website: rogersdrumsusa.com

Rogers Drums is an American multinational drum manufacturer. It was founded in 1849 and originally based in Covington, Ohio. During the twentieth century, their drums enjoyed popularity with musicians spanning from the Dixieland jazz era in the 1920s to classic rock in the 1960s and 1970s, but was particularly associated with big band and swing drummers of the 1940s and 1950s.

== History ==
The Rogers company was started in 1849 by James Rogers, an Irish immigrant from Dublin to the United States. Rogers started crafting drum heads in Brewster's Station, New York. A second tannery was established later in Farmingdale, New Jersey, operated by his son Joseph H. Rogers Junior. James Rogers' grandson Cleveland S. Rogers began to manufacture the first "Rogers" drums at the Farmingdale tannery in the 1930s. The first Rogers drums were assembled from shells and hardware of other manufacturers but mounted with Rogers heads.

In 1955, Cleveland Rogers, who had no heirs, sold the Rogers drum company to Henry Grossman. Grossman moved the company to Covington, Ohio, and under his leadership, Rogers moved to the forefront of American drum making for the next decade and a half. Design engineer Joe Thompson and marketing manager Ben Strauss were instrumental in Rogers' success during its golden age from the mid-1950s to the late 1960s. The company's drums were embraced by musicians from the Dixieland movement to the classic rockers of the 1960s and 1970s. However, the manufacturer was most closely associated with the "big band" and swing drummers of the 1940s and 1950s.

=== The Dyna-Sonic snare drum ===
Rogers' "Dyna-Sonic" snare drum featured a number of innovations, such as a unique cradle in which the snare wires were supported. This device provided a means by which the longitudinal tension of the snare wires could be adjusted independently of the vertical force holding the snares against the bottom head. As a result, the snares could be tensioned as tightly as the drummer wanted without having to be pulled against the head so hard they constrained (choked) the head's vibration. This and other innovations (for example, a remarkably shallow—4/1000"—snare bed) made possible by the novel tensioning arrangement gave the drum a relatively crisp and recognizably clear sound. Dyna-Sonics were made from about 1961 until the mid-'80s. The company was bought in 1966 by CBS Musical Instruments, which had also acquired in 1965 Fender Guitars and Rhodes Pianos. The vast majority of Dyna-Sonics had COB (chrome over brass) shells. Only a small number of wood-shell Dyna-Sonics was made during the lifetime of the drum. Pristine models can fetch thousands of dollars on the vintage drum market. Other notable Rogers drums were the Powertone model of snare drums and the Holiday model of tom-toms and bass drums. Fiberglass timpani were also manufactured for a time, named Accu-Sonic.

In addition to its Dyna-Sonic snare drum, Rogers was renowned for its highly-innovative hardware. Much of it was developed by Thompson, including the Swiv-o-Matic line of bass drum pedals, hi-hats, cymbal stands, and tom-tom holders. The cymbal stands and tom-tom holders featured a ball-and-socket tilting mechanism. Even Ludwig drummers like Ringo Starr of The Beatles, Mitch Mitchell of The Jimi Hendrix Experience, and John Bonham of Led Zeppelin used some Swiv-o-Matic hardware items on their kits. Keith Moon used Swiv-o-Matic hardware on his Premier kit.

Neil Peart of RUSH played a Rogers 5"x14" Rogers Dynasonic Snare on Fly by Night, Caress of Steel, 2112 and All The World's A Stage. He also used Rogers hardware, specifically, a single Swiv-o-Matic tom holder on his large Slingerland and Tama drum kits through the mid-1980s in order to position a tom-tom directly over the center of one of his bass drums.

From 1964 until 1975, Rogers shells were 5-ply construction of alternating plies of maple and birch wood with reinforcement rings. From late 1975 until 1978 the shells were made up of 5 alternating plies of maple and birch wood with reinforcement rings. Starting in 1978, Rogers began offering drums with 8-ply shells without reinforcement rings (made by Keller Products, Inc. of Manchester, NH) for its XP-8 line. They marked the beginning of relatively heavy, thick "stadium" shells that favored attack and projection over midrange tonality. These drums were promoted as "the best Rogers drums ever made" and the XP-8 models lived up to that claim.

1976 saw the introduction of "Memriloc" hardware. This innovation was co-developed by Dave Donoho and Roy Burns. It was the first of the super-stable hardware systems and was subsequently copied by most major drum manufacturers in one form or another. Most modern drum hardware evolved from the Rogers Memrilock concept. For the growing European market, Rogers drums were made in the UK by Ajax under license from Rogers USA. The hardware was Rogers, but the drum shells were supplied by Ajax from its UK production. Dave Clark of the Dave Clark Five and Pete York of the Spencer Davis Group were prominent British drummers using Rogers equipment during that era; along with Mick Avory of the Kinks (before switching to Ludwig) and John Steel of The Animals (after switching from Premier).

Shortly after being purchased by CBS in 1966, Rogers drums moved its production in 1969 from Ohio to a Fullerton, CA factory complex, where the American Fender Guitars were also produced.

In 1983, CBS sold Rogers and Fender to a group of individuals who were running the Fender division; the new owners soon after decided to discontinue the Rogers Drums line. Between 1984 and 1998, the Rogers name was owned by Island Music, who manufactured low-cost copies of the famous Big R Rogers drums outside the US.

=== 1998 to present day ===
In 1998, the Rogers name was acquired by the Brook Mays Music Company (BMMC) of Dallas, Texas, and renewed as a low-cost import line of beginner drum sets, which were sold exclusively through the company's own chain of music stores. Bill Crowden, son-in-law of Ludwig's Bill Ludwig, worked then for BMMC and, with Vice President of Marketing Jim Rosenthal, developed a new Rogers line of drums with maple and birch shells, beavertail lugs, and double-braced hardware, made at first by Peace Drums of Taiwan and given the names of Rogers kits and drums from the 1960s.

In summer 2006, BMMC filed for Chapter 11 bankruptcy protection. On August 26, 2006, the Yamaha Corporation of America announced that it had acquired the intellectual property rights to the Rogers Drum Company at the BMMC bankruptcy court-ordered auction. Tom Sumner, vice president and general manager of Yamaha's Pro Audio & Combo Division, pledged that Yamaha would "improve on the Rogers legacy." Yamaha displayed its new Rogers drums at NAMM 2007.

In 2013, the rights to Rogers drums were acquired by Joseph Chen, then the president of Dixon Drums, who revived the brand for a line of handcrafted snare drums that used many Rogers hardware designs from the 1950s and '60s. Rogers has reissued a 5-ply maple version of the "Dyna-Sonic" snare drum featuring the "Clock Face" double-rail snare straining device and re-engineered "Bread and Butter" lugs.

== Players ==
The following players used Rogers drums in whole or part:

- Mick Avory
- Dave Clark
- Brian Downey
- Mick Fleetwood
- Al Jackson Jr.
- Sam Lay
- Earl Palmer
- Marky Ramone
- Tommy Ramone
- Buddy Rich
- John Steel
- Gina Schock
- Danny Seraphine
- Louie Bellson
- John Barbata
- Hal Blaine
- Dino Danelli
- Dallas Taylor
- Spencer Dryden
- Mickey Hart
- Cozy Cole
- Ed Shaughnessy
- Roy Burns
- Pete York
- Bob Stubbs
- Chris Frantz
- Scott Asheton
- Louis Hayes
- Dennis Wilson
- Neil Peart
