= Mixel Pixel =

Music/video project based in New York

- Origin: Brooklyn, New York, United States
- Genres: Indie pop
- Years active: 1995 - 2009
- Labels: Kanine Records (United States); Mental Monkey (United States)
- Members: Matty Kaukeinen; Kaia Wong; Rob Corradetti
- Past members: Ben Russell; Little John; Matt Snee

Mixel Pixel was a music/video project based in Brooklyn, New York, active from 1995-2009.

Formed in December 1995 in rural Minnesota, Mixel Pixel soon released their first home recorded 4 track cassettes, Lez Puff, Pastelogram, and Basement Mom. Later, they relocated to Delaware where they spent the next 4 years recording their first LP called Mappyland. Upon moving to New York in 1999, they made a string of homemade cut-and-paste rock LPs; Rainbow Panda, Contact Kid, Music For Plants, Let's Be Friends, and Highschool is not Hell.

In 2007 Mixel Pixel toured with Of Montreal. Through the years they've also shared the stage with Man Man, Chromatics, Extreme Animals, Chairlift, Grand Buffet, Ra Ra Riot, Grizzly Bear, We Are Wolves, They Might Be Giants, HEALTH, and Pit er Pat.

Mixel Pixel have collaborated on music videos with paperrad, Noah Lyon, Ricardo Rivera, Radical Friend, and Devin Clark.

Mixel Pixel have remixed bands including Professor Murder and Of Montreal.

== Discography ==
=== Official Albums ===
==== Mappy Land (2000) ====
1. Fake Violin Solo
2. Subhuman Levels
3. One Up
4. Go Mappy Land for U
5. Charlie 5000
6. Song Y
7. Polaroid Booth
8. Coney Island Bound Trash Train
9. (daphne's tape)
10. 10 Ft. Coffin
11. Steamroller
12. Body Double
13. Cyclone Took My Baby

==== Rainbow Panda (2003) ====
1. Pink Shirts
2. My Animal
3. Desert Falcon
4. Silver Sparkle Amps
5. Holsters
6. Out of the Woods
7. _____m
8. Psych Mo-Fo
9. Your No. 1
10. Oh! the Summer People
11. Boy with the Saddest Eyes
12. Perfect Little World
13. Body Automatic

==== Contact Kid (2004) ====
1. I Am the Contact Kid
2. Mantis Rock
3. Penny Rocket / Romantic
4. Little Wolverine
5. Tell Tale Drum Machine
6. Out of My Mind
7. At the Arcade
8. Gas House Gables
9. Pittsburgh Brain
10. The Drag City Starlet

==== Music for Plants (2006) ====
1. You're the Kind of Girl
2. Switchblade Sister
3. Coming Up X's
4. Black Van
5. I Cannot Die
6. Behind the Sun
7. Ghost for Life
8. Abandon Ship
9. These Mortality Pictures
10. Turkish Delights

==== Let's Be Friends (2008) ====
1. What Ever Happened to One
2. Sinking Feeling
3. Favorite Sweatshirt On
4. Great Invention
5. Let's Be Friends
6. Cats
7. You Could Be...
8. So Regal (Tigershark Kiss)
9. Fake Girlfriend
10. Last Song
11. Distant Station

=== Other releases ===
==== You're the Kind of Girl (digital ep 2006) ====
1. You're the Kind of Girl
2. What Are You Wearing? (Momus cover)
3. Personal Space Invaders
4. My Animal (Poingly Mix)

==== Coming Up X's (12" 2006) ====
1. Coming Up X's (Album Version)
2. Coming Up X's (Alan Astor Mix)
3. Coming Up X's (Streetlab Mix)
4. Coming Up X's (Poingly Mix)
5. X's Is the Reason (Books On Tape Mix)

==== You're the Kind of Girl (7" 2006) ====
1. You're the Kind of Girl
2. Artificial Kid

==== Sinking Feeling (digital single 2008) ====
1. Sinking Feeling
2. I've Been Around
3. My Summer World (with Lauren Winslow)
