= Oxford Collapse (EP) =

Album

Oxford Collapse EP

EP by Oxford Collapse
- Released: July 2002
- Genre: Indie rock
- Label: Hot Chubbs Records

Oxford Collapse chronology
Oxford Collapse EP (2002)	Some Wilderness (2004)

This self-titled EP by indie rock group Oxford Collapse was originally released in a limited pressing by the Hot Chubbs Records (HCR) label. It has since been available from Kanine Records and Sub Pop.

== Track listing ==
1. "If It Dies in Peoria Then Who the Hell Cares?" – 3:19
2. "Grasses of Anne" – 3:04
3. "Sex Face" – 2:40
4. "(Having a Blast In) Co-Op City" – 3:39
5. "Melting the Ice Queen" – 6:54
