= Magic Mirror (album) =

Studio album by Pearl Charles
- Released: January 15, 2021
- Studio: Ahata (Echo Park); Knobworld (Echo Park); Hurley (Costa Mesa)
- Genre: Indie pop; indie rock
- Length: 36:58
- Label: Kanine
- Producer: Lewis Pesacov

Pearl Charles chronology
Sleepless Dreamer (2018)	Magic Mirror (2021)

Professional ratings
Aggregate scores
Source	Rating
AnyDecentMusic?	7.6/10
Metacritic	78/100
Review scores
Source	Rating
AllMusic	4/5 stars
Beats Per Minute	79%
Exclaim!	8/10
The Guardian	3/5 stars
The Independent	4/5 stars
The Line of Best Fit	8/10

Magic Mirror is the second studio album by American singer-songwriter Pearl Charles. It was released on January 15, 2021, through Kanine Records.

== Release ==
Pearl Charles announced the release of her second studio album on September 15, 2020.

=== Singles ===
On September 15, 2020, Pearl Charles released the first single from the album, "What I Need". In a press release of the single, Charles explained: "Have you ever stuck with something long after it was time to let go? "What I Need" explores this choice in terms of a breakup, though it could really be applied to any situation that is no longer serving you. It's the age-old story of wanting to stay in a comfortable relationship but knowing that you have to move on for personal growth, and the fear and uncertainty that being alone will bring, even though it's for the best."

The second single "Take Your Time" was released on October 13, 2020.

== Critical reception ==
Magic Mirror was met with "generally favorable" reviews from critics. At Metacritic, which assigns a weighted average rating out of 100 to reviews from mainstream publications, this release received an average score of 78 based on 7 reviews. At AnyDecentMusic?, the release was given a 7.6 out of 10 based on 10 reviews.

Writing for AllMusic, Timothy Monger stated: "Pearl Charles strikes a confident, if laid-back tone on Magic Mirror, her sophomore album. The production and arrangements throughout are impeccable, warm, and well-suited to the kind of thoughtful, low-key songwriting at which Charles excels. Magic Mirror is the kind of subtle record that reveals its pleasures through repeated listens. Even Charles' voice is a comfort." At Beats Per Minute, Ana Leorne wrote: "The album embodies liberation in the profoundest of ways, a pondered life-changing move that is definitely not the product of naive hot-headedness. Led by warm and sparkly singles "What I Need", "Imposter", and "Take Your Time", Magic Mirror is deliciously referential whilst refusing to remain stuck in a particular time and space that only exists in selective memory.

Jordan Currie at Exclaim! rated the release an 8 out of 10, writing "The singer-songwriter's second LP is a blissful journey of cosmic country, disco and poppy psych rock that dances its way into the new year. Magic Mirror is a young woman's trip through a whirlwind of self-reflection and self-discovery." At The Independent, Roisin O'Connor said: "Influenced heavily by the sun-drenched sounds of Sixties and Seventies California, Magic Mirror incorporates bright, cosmic synths and classic rock motifs, along with brilliant, subtle flexes of country slide guitar. While Charles frequently plays with themes of self-doubt and setbacks, the buoyant instrumentation provides a freewheeling sense of optimism."

John Amen, writing for Cultural Daily, gave the album a score of 7.9/10, concluding: "The winning elements of Magic Mirror are Pearl Charles’s supple voice and her knack for reimagining the classic templates of 60’s and 70’s singer-songwriters. Charles blends resourcefulness and a contemporary flair, displaying what might be dubbed an historically informed originality."

== Track listing ==
Magic Mirror track listing
No.	Title	Writer(s)	Length
1.	"Only for Tonight"	Pearl Charles; Hank Fontaine	4:32
2.	"What I Need"	Charles; Carrick Moore-Gerety	3:24
3.	"Imposter"	Charles	3:25
4.	"Don't Feel Like Myself"	Charles; Annie Shaw	3:57
5.	"Magic Mirror"	Charles; Morgan Nagler	2:58
6.	"Slipping Away"	Charles	3:49
7.	"All the Way"	Charles; Toma Banjanin; Michael Rault	2:56
8.	"Take Your Time"	Charles; Lewis Pesacov	3:45
9.	"Sweet Sunshine Wine"	Charles; James Delong; Ben Cook	4:10
10.	"As Long as You're Mine"	Charles; Pesacov	4:02
Total length:			36:58

== Personnel ==
Musicians

- Pearl Charles – lead vocals, percussion
- Dustin Bookatz – bass
- Ryan Miller – drums, percussion
- Connor "Catfish" Gallaher – guitar, pedal steel
- Michael Rault – guitar, keyboards
- Lewis Pesacov – guitar, keyboards
- Max Mart – pedal steel, keyboards
- Drew Erickson – keyboards
- Mitchell Toshida – keyboards
- Farmer Dave Scher – keyboards
- Bradleah Mac – horns
- Stewart Cole – horns
- Matt Popieluch – banjo
- Magic Mirror Quartet – strings

Technical

- Lewis Pesacov – production, mixing, recording
- Reuben Cohen – mastering
- Garret Lang – engineering assistance
- James Meder – engineering assistance

Visuals

- Dana Trippe – photos
- Harrison Roberts – art, design, layout
