= A Good Ground =

Album by Oxford Collapse

Studio album by Oxford Collapse
- Released: July 2005
- Genre: Indie rock
- Length: 39:17
- Label: Kanine Records

Oxford Collapse chronology
Songs For The Singers Of Panthers (2004)	A Good Ground (2005)	Remember The Night Parties (2006)

Professional ratings
Review scores
Source	Rating
Allmusic	4/5 stars
Pitchfork Media	7.8/10 link

A Good Ground is the second LP released by Oxford Collapse. It was originally released on Kanine Records, but has since been made available by Sub Pop.

== Track listing ==
1. "Empty Fields" – 1:10
2. "Prop Cars" – 3:01
3. "Last American Virgin" – 3:06
4. "The Boys Go Home" – 4:06
5. "Dusty Horses Practice" – 3:45
6. "Cracks in the Causeway" – 3:58
7. "Flora Y Fauna" – 1:33
8. "Proofreading" – 3:53
9. "Flaws" – 3:57
10. "No Great Shakes" – 3:14
11. "Volunteers" – 2:34
12. "Keep 'Em in a Canyon" – 5:00
