= Thousand Palms (disambiguation) =

Thousand Palms or 1000 Palms may refer to:

- 1000 Palms, an album by the rock band Surfer Blood
- Thousand Palms, California, a community in Riverside County
- Thousand Palms Oasis and Canyon, in Riverside County, California's Indio Hills
