= Cocoon of Love =

Studio album by Princeton
- Released: September 29, 2009
- Recorded: 2009; Eagle Rock, Los Angeles
- Genres: Indie pop, Indie rock
- Label: Kanine Records

Princeton chronology
Cocoon of Love (2009)	Remembrance of Things to Come (2012)

Professional ratings
Review scores
Source	Rating
AllMusic	4/5 stars
Pitchfork Media	5.9/10

Cocoon of Love is the debut album of Los Angeles indie pop band Princeton. The album was released on September 29, 2009, on Kanine Records.

== Track listing ==
1. "Sadie and Andy" – 3:36
2. "Show Some Love, When Your Man Gets Home" - 3:51
3. "Calypso Gold" - 3:44
4. "Korean War Memorial" - 4:02
5. "Stunner Shades in Heaven" - 4:11
6. "Martina and Clive Krantz" - 2:47
7. "Shout it Out" - 2:41
8. "Sylvie" - 3:36
9. "I Left My Love in Nagasaki" - 4:12
10. "Worried Head" - 2:56
11. "The Wild" - 3:45
