= Some Wilderness =

Album

Studio album by Oxford Collapse
- Released: April 2004
- Genre: Indie rock
- Length: 45:42
- Label: Kanine Records

Oxford Collapse chronology
Oxford Collapse (2002)	Some Wilderness (2004)	Melting the Ice Queen (2004)

Professional ratings
Review scores
Source	Rating
Allmusic	link

Some Wilderness was originally released on Kanine Records in April 2004. It has since been made available by Sub Pop.

== Track listing ==
1. "Land!" - 4:45
2. "1991 Kids" - 3:42
3. "The Money You Have Is Maybe Too Little" - 3:33
4. "Cumberland Gap" - 4:24
5. "Melting the Ice Queen" - 6:34
6. "Totally Gay, Totally Fat" - 4:38
7. "Back in Com Again" - 2:30
8. "For Buds, Not Boston" - 4:23
9. "General Hospital" - 4:42
10. "The Tribal Rites of the New Saturday Night" - 6:31
