= Drink Up Buttercup =

American band

- Origin: Bucks County, Pennsylvania, United States
- Years active: 2007-2010
- Labels: Yep Roc
- Members: James Harvey, Mike Cammarata, Farzad Houshiarnejad, Ben Money

Drink Up Buttercup was an American band from Philadelphia. Band members were James Harvey (vocals), Mike Cammarata (drums), Farzad Houshiarnejad (organs, bass, guitar, percussion) and Ben Money (bass, organs, percussion). The band came together in Bucks County, Pennsylvania in late 2007, making their debut performance at a cigar parlor.

Drink Up Buttercup released their first 7" single, "Mr. Pie Eyes", on the UK label Make Mine Music. Following this were sets at CMJ Music Marathon and South by Southwest.

The band's second single, "Farewell Captain", was released in April 2009 on Kanine Records. The song earned the band praise from Stereogum.

Drink Up Buttercup's debut album Born and Thrown on a Hook was released March 23, 2010 on Yep Roc Records. The album was recorded throughout 2009 by Bill Moriarty and mixed by Rusty Santos.
