= Remember the Night Parties =

Album by Oxford Collapse

Studio album by Oxford Collapse
- Released: October 10, 2006
- Genre: Indie rock
- Length: 40:53
- Label: Sub Pop

Oxford Collapse chronology
A Good Ground (2005)	Remember the Night Parties (2006)	Bits (2008)

Professional ratings
Review scores
Source	Rating
Allmusic	4/5 stars
Pitchfork Media	7.9/10

Remember the Night Parties is the third album by Oxford Collapse and their first to be released by Sub Pop.

== Track listing ==
1. "He'll Paint While We Play" - 3:21
2. "Please Visit Your National Parks" - 4:08
3. "Loser City" - 3:54
4. "For the Khakis and the Sweatshirts" - 3:12
5. "Return/Of Burno" - 8:06
6. "Lady Lawyers" - 3:14
7. "Let's Vanish" - 3:18
8. "Kenny Can't Afford It" - 2:40
9. "Molasses" - 2:57
10. "Forgot to Write" - 3:01
11. "In Your Volcano" - 3:02
