= Veps (band) =

Norwegian indie pop band

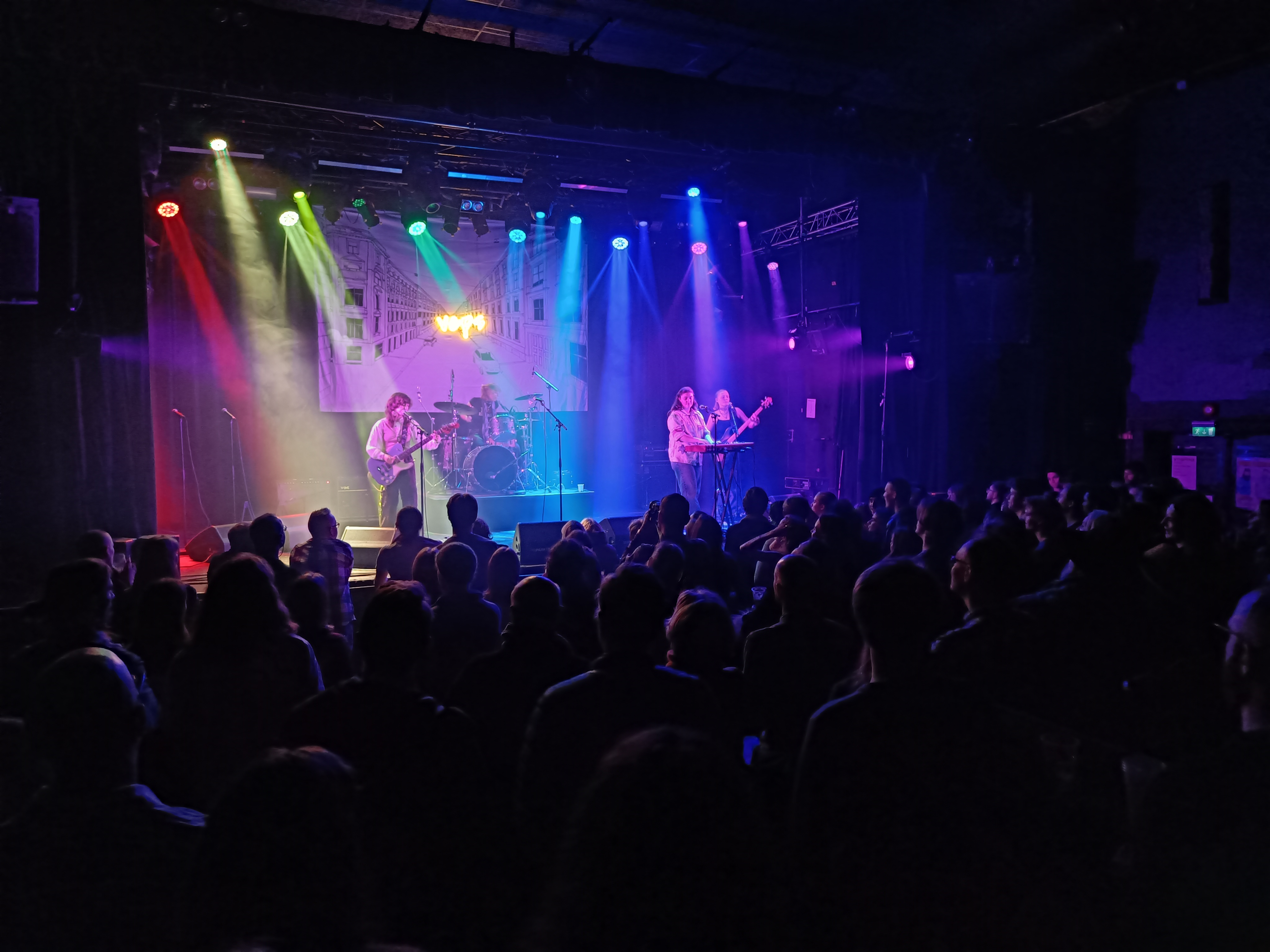
- Veps in concert at Parkteatret, Oslo, March 2023.

Background information
- Origin: Oslo, Norway
- Genre: Indie rock
- Years active: 2018-present
- Labels: Kanine Records; Universal Music; PNKSLM
- Members: Maja Beitrusten Berge; Laura Dodson; Helena Mariero Olasveengen; June Urholt
- Website: www.vepsofficial.com

Veps is a Norwegian indie pop band from Oslo, Norway. The band consists of four members, Maja Beitrusten Berge (drums), Laura Dodson (vocals and guitar), Helena Mariero Olasveengen (vocals and keyboards) and June Urholt (bass).

== History ==
The band was founded in 2018, when the girls went to middle school together and teamed up to make a short film, "Liv and Erle", which won an award at the Norwegian Amandusfestival in 2019. They later realised they shared the same musical interests and agreed to start a band together at the age of 14. The band was invited to play at the 2021 Great Escape Festival held annually in Brighton and Hove, England, the Reeperbahn Festival in Hamburg, as well as the Norwegian show case festivals Vill Vill Vest in Bergen and by:Larm in Oslo later the same year.

On November 28, 2022 Veps were among the first acts to be announced to Øyafestivalen in August 2023 and subsequently named as one of five up-and-coming acts not to be missed by Clash Magazine.

=== Name ===
The name of the band, Veps, is Norwegian for wasp.

=== Record labels ===
Veps was signed to the independent record label Kanine Records in 2020. They released their first single, "Ecstasy," through the label on 23 April 2021.

On 26 January 2024, Veps released the single "Greetings From Peru" and at the same time announced their second album, Dedicated To:, released 14 June 2024, on Miktam Records/Universal Music.

Their first single after Dedicated To:, "My Champagne Socialist", was released through the Swedish label PNKSLM on 27 August 2025.

=== Music ===
'Ecstasy' peaked at 23 on the Spanish iTunes Top 100 Alternative Songs Chart. The band released their first EP, 'Open the Door', on Kanine Records on 11 June 2021. The EP was mixed by the Norwegian producer Matias Tellez. Caitlin Mincher of the music site, 'WhentheHornBlows' remarked that the EP is "the perfect bridge between the unique and the familiar. Open the Door is a gorgeous blend of 90’s angst and raw instrumentals, and it’s a debut that’s beyond promising", while Atwood Magazine said it "introduces a vibrant new artistry, sets a high bar, and makes room for growth in all directions".

Following the 'Open the Door' EP the band released the single 'His brother' in October 2021. In March 2022 they released another single, 'Ballerina (Norah)', which led to Veps being picked as the Spotlight Artist of the week at the BBC Radio 6 Music show New Music Fix by Steve Lamacq on Friday March 25, 2002. God Is in the TV wrote about 'Ballerina (Norah)' that it "is a impossibly catchy hook laden track (..) swelling with wonderful harmonies to a wonderful chorus that teeters on that balance beam of affection and insecurity. Both singles were released on Kanine Records.

On September 16, 2022 Veps announced their forthcoming debut album Oslo Park, to be released on November 18, 2022 on Kanine Records. At the same time they released the single "Mooney Tunes" which according to Paste Magazine "sharpens Veps' warm indie-rock sound to a fine point, yet maintains the dreamy whimsy of their earlier material".

Veps' sophomore album Dedicated To: was released on June 14, 2024. According to When the Horn Blows, the record sees the band stick to their wonderfully DIY roots and imbue their sound with a new sense of maturity and growth.

In March 2026 Veps announced their third full-length album ChurchyardStreet 8B, their first with Swedish indie label PNKSLM Recordings, to be released on May 29 2026.

== Musical style and influences ==
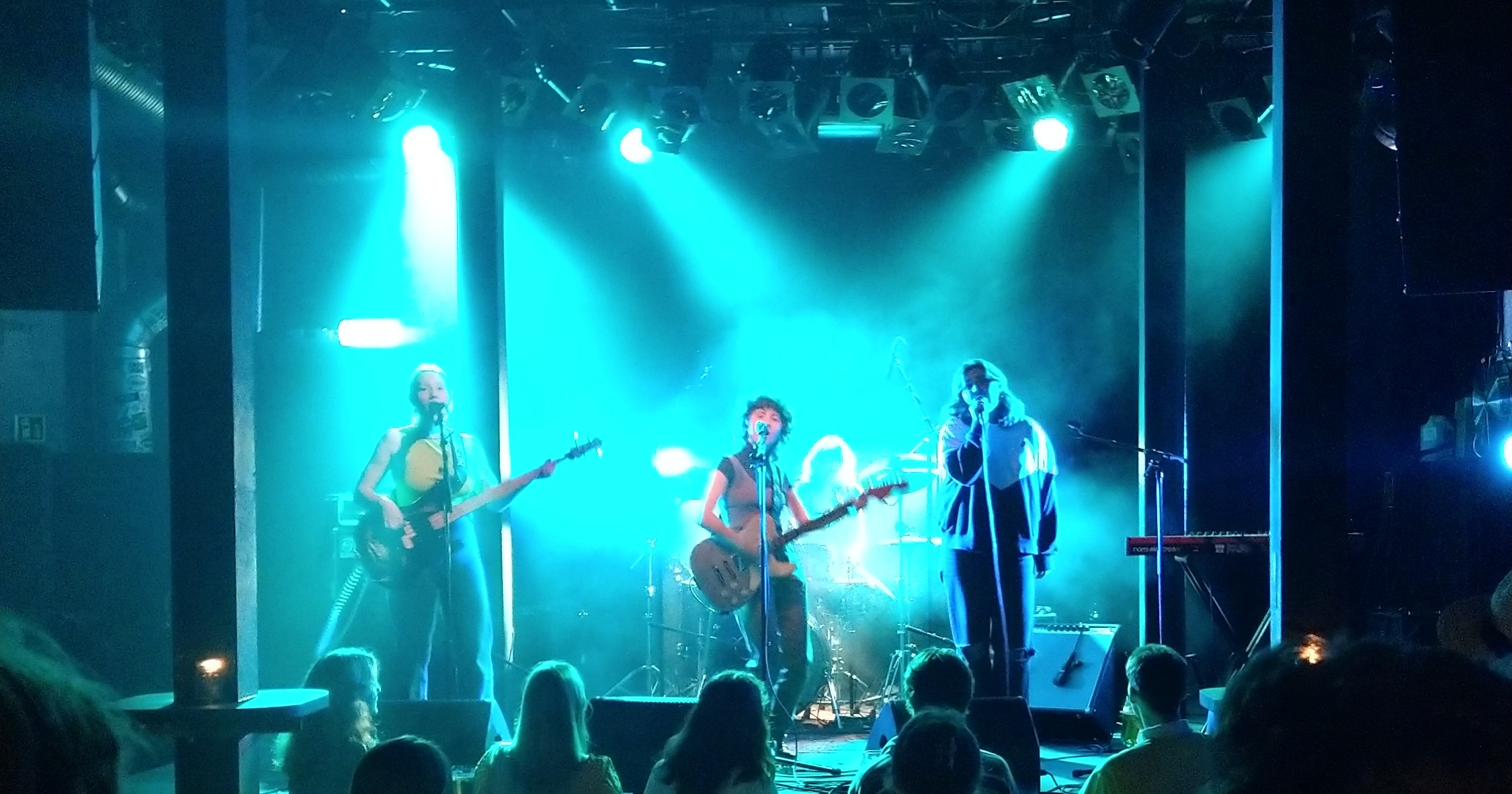
Veps in concert at Blå, Oslo, 2021

The band's music style is described as fusing alt-pop with indie rock elements.

== Discography ==
=== LPs ===
List of LPs
Title	Details
Oslo Park	Released date: 18 November 2022; Label: Kanine Records; Formats: Vinyl, streaming, digital download
Dedicated To:	Released date: 14 June 2024; Label: Miktam Records/Universal Music; Formats: Vinyl, streaming
ChurchyardStreet 8B	Release date: 29 May 2026; Label: PNKSLM; Formats: Vinyl, streaming, digital download

=== EPs ===
List of EPs
Title	Details
Open the Door	Released date: 11 June 2021; Label: Kanine Records; Formats: Vinyl, streaming, digital download

=== Singles ===
List of singles, with year released and album name shown
Title	Year	Album
"Ecstasy"	2021	Open the Door
"Girl on TV"	2021	Open the Door
"His Brother"	2021	Oslo Park
"Ballerina (Norah)"	2022	Oslo Park
"UFO"	2022	Oslo Park
"Mooney Tunes"	2022	Oslo Park
"A Show of Hands"	2022	Oslo Park
"No. 2"	2023	*On Oslo Park vinyl edition only
"Greetings From Peru"	2024	Dedicated To:
"So Speak"	2024	Dedicated To:
"Break & Entry"	2024	Dedicated To:
"Say What?"	2024	Dedicated To:
"My Champagne Socialist"	2025	ChurchyardStreet 8B
"Didgeridoo"	2025	ChurchyardStreet 8B
"If I Was A Mother"	2026	ChurchyardStreet 8B

=== Music videos ===
List of music videos, with year released and director shown
Title	Year	Director	Album	Ref.
"Ecstasy"	2021	Veps	Open the Door	
"Girl on TV"	2021	Veps	Open the Door	
"His Brother"	2021	Veps	Oslo Park	
"Ballerina (Norah)"	2022	Veps	Oslo Park	
"UFO"	2022	Veps	Oslo Park	
"Mooney Tunes"	2022	Iver Eriksen	Oslo Park	
"A Show of Hands"	2022	Laura Dodson	Oslo Park	
"No. 2"	2023	Veps	*On Oslo Park vinyl edition only	
"Greetings From Peru"	2024	Veps	Dedicated To:	
"So Speak"	2024	Iver Ambrosius	Dedicated To:	
"My Champagne Socialist"	2025	Veps	ChurchyardStreet 8B	
"Didgeridoo"	2025	Veps	ChurchyardStreet 8B	
"If I Was A Mother"	2026	Veps	ChurchyardStreet 8B	

== Filmography ==
=== Television ===
Year	Title	Role	Notes	Ref.
2022	Headhunters	Veps	2 episodes	

=== Short film ===
Year	Title	Role	Director	Notes	Ref.
2024	So Speak	Veps	Iver Ambrosius		
