= Bits (album) =

Album by Oxford Collapse

Studio album by Oxford Collapse
- Released: August 5, 2008
- Genre: Indie rock
- Label: Sub Pop

Oxford Collapse chronology
Remember the Night Parties (2006)	Bits (2008)

Professional ratings
Review scores
Source	Rating
AllMusic	3.5/5 stars
Paste	86/100
Pitchfork Media	7.8/10
Spin	3.5/5 stars

Bits is the fourth and final album by Oxford Collapse. Two singles were released from the album, "The Birthday Wars" and "Young Love Delivers".

== Track listing ==
_{All tracks by Oxford Collapse}

1. "Electric Arc" – 2:42
2. "The Birthday Wars" – 2:14
3. "Vernon-Jackson" – 2:42
4. "Young Love Delivers" – 3:49
5. "Back of the Yards" – 2:26
6. "A Wedding" – 2:45
7. "Featherbeds" – 3:17
8. "For the Winter Coats" – 3:15
9. "Men and Their Ideas" – 1:50
10. "Children's Crusade" – 3:03
11. "John Blood" – 3:59
12. "B-Roll" – 2:38
13. "I Hate Nobody" – 3:47

== Personnel ==
- Michael Pace – vocals, guitars
- Dan Fetherston – drums
- Adam Rizer – bass, vocals
