= Pearl Charles =

American singer-songwriter

- Pearl Charles performing at SXSW 2016 in Austin, Texas.

Background information
- Born: May 11, 1991 (age 35)
- Origin: Los Angeles, California, United States
- Genres: Indie rock; folk rock; alternative country; psychedelic rock; acid rock; Americana
- Instruments: Vocals, guitar, drums
- Years active: 2012–present
- Labels: Kanine, Burger
- Formerly of: The Blank Tapes
- Father: Larry Charles

Pearl Charles (born May 11, 1991) is an American singer-songwriter from Los Angeles, California. Her sound is a melding of 1960s rock and 1970s cosmic country.

== Education ==
Pearl Charles earned a BFA in music from CalArts.

== Music ==
Pearl Charles got her start as a musician at age 18 in a country duo called the Driftwood Singers, with Christian Lee Hutson. She then went on to join a garage rock band called the Blank Tapes as drummer.

Charles began a solo project in 2012, and released her first solo record, a 2015 self-titled EP on Burger Records.

According to Billboard, Charles is a genre-blending artist in the style of Lana Del Rey and Jenny Lewis, with "subdued vocals and more uptempo, playful production".

Kanine Records released her full-length debut album, titled Sleepless Dreamer, in 2018.

== Personal life ==
Charles is the daughter of Larry Charles. She is a frequent collaborator with Los Angeles fashion designer Philip Seastrom.

== Discography ==
Studio albums

- Sleepless Dreamer (2018)
- Magic Mirror (2021)
- Desert Queen (2025)

Singles and EPs

- Pearl Charles (2015)
- "Night Tides" (2017)
- "Sleepless Dreamer" (2018)
- "All the Boys" (2018)
