= Oxford Collapse =

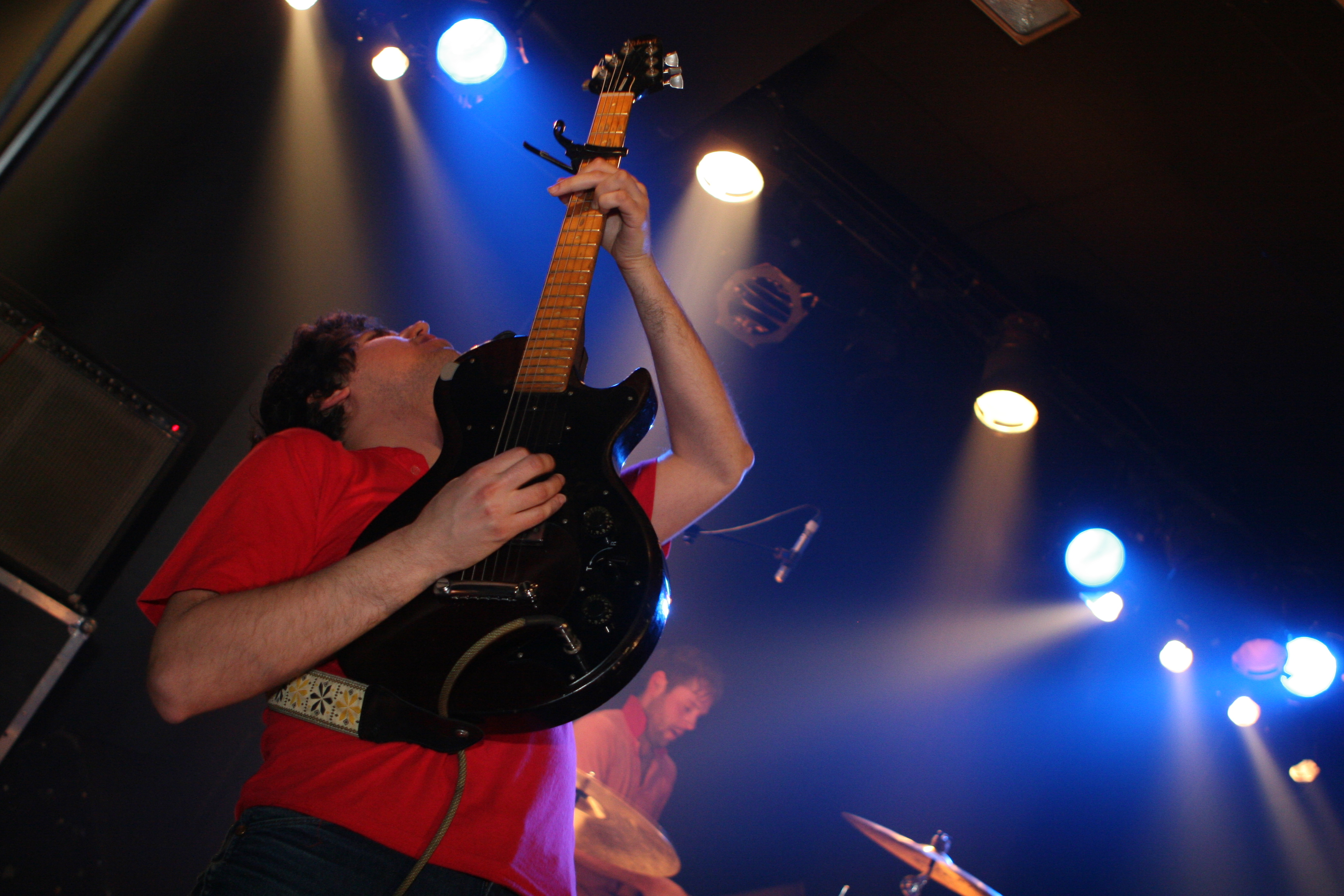
- Oxford Collapse playing in Barcelona

Background information
- Origin: New York City
- Genres: Indie rock
- Years active: 2002–2009
- Labels: Sub Pop
- Members: Michael Pace; Adam Rizer; Dan Fetherston
- Past members: Yong Sing da Silva; Mike Henry

Oxford Collapse were an American indie rock band from Brooklyn, New York. The band’s lineup included Michael Pace on vocals and guitars, Dan Fetherston on drums, and Adam Rizer on bass and vocals.

== History ==
Oxford Collapse first released a limited press self-titled EP for the HCR label in 2002.

Shortly after they signed to Kanine Records, a label based in New York City/Brooklyn, where they released their first full-length album Some Wilderness in April 2004. This was followed by a remix of a track from the album titled "Melting the Ice Queen" in July of that year.

In October, the band released a 7-inch vinyl EP, entitled Songs For The Singers Of Panthers, on Discoloration Records before releasing their final effort from Kanine Records, A Good Ground.

The band then signed to indie label Sub Pop, where they released Remember The Night Parties in October 2006. The album earned a 7.9 out of 10 from Pitchfork Media, who also rated "Please Visit Your National Parks" 96th in their year-end "Top 100 Tracks of 2006" feature.

The latest studio album Bits was released on August 5, 2008. They supported We Are Scientists on their UK tour.

In June 2009, the band announced their split after eight years together.

Mike Pace has subsequently gone on to form the band The Child Actors, who released their first single in March 2012.

== Members ==
Final Lineup

- Michael Pace – vocals, guitar
- Adam Rizer – bass, backing vocals
- Dan Fetherston – drums

== Discography ==
=== Albums ===
- Some Wilderness (2004) Kanine Records
- A Good Ground (2005) Kanine Records
- Remember the Night Parties (2006) Sub Pop
- Bits (2008) Sub Pop

=== EPs ===
- Oxford Collapse (EP) (2002) HRC
- Songs for the Singers of Panthers (7-inch, 2002) Discoloration Records
- Melting the Ice Queen (remix) (12-inch, 2004) Kanine Records
- The Hann-Byrd EP (12-inch, 2008) Comedy Minus One

=== Singles ===
- "Decking the Classics" (2006, Version City)
- "Please Visit Your National Parks" (2006) Sub Pop
- "Spike of Bensonhurst" (2008, Flameshovel)
- "The Birthday Wars" (2008, Sub Pop)
- "Young Love Delivers" (2008, Sub Pop)
- "Oxford Collapse & Joggers split 7-inch" (2009, Cocktail Partner)
