= Snowdonia (album) =

Studio album by Surfer Blood
- Released: February 3, 2017
- Studios: Dungeon Recording Studio in Miami, Florida
- Genres: Indie rock, surf rock
- Length: 38:03
- Label: Joyful Noise
- Producers: John Paul Pitts, Surfer Blood

Surfer Blood chronology
1000 Palms (2015)	Snowdonia (2017)	Carefree Theatre (2020)

Professional ratings
Aggregate scores
Source	Rating
Metacritic	67/100
Review scores
Source	Rating
AllMusic	3/5 stars
The A.V. Club	B
Exclaim!	7/10
Pitchfork	6.9/10
PopMatters	6/10
Under the Radar	7/10

Snowdonia is the fourth studio album by American indie rock band Surfer Blood, released on February 3, 2017, on Joyful Noise. It was the band's first album since the death of guitarist Thomas Fekete and the departure of bass guitarist Kevin Williams. The album features artwork from sculptor Devra Freelander.

== Track listing ==
No.	Title	Length
1.	"Matter of Time"	3:04
2.	"Frozen"	3:59
3.	"Dino Jay"	3:51
4.	"Six Flags in F or G"	5:23
5.	"Snowdonia"	7:46
6.	"Instant Doppelgängers"	4:40
7.	"Taking Care of Eddy"	3:29
8.	"Carrier Pigeon"	5:51

== Personnel ==
=== Surfer Blood ===
- John Paul Pitts - vocals, rhythm guitar
- Mike McCleary - lead guitar
- Lindsey Mills - bass
- Tyler Schwarz - drums

=== Production ===
- Surfer Blood - production
- Fred Freeman - engineering
- Brian Rosemeyer - engineering
- John Paul Pitts - mixing
- Rob Schnapf - mixing
- Pete Lyman - mastering
- Devra Freelander - artwork
- David Woodruff - layout
