= Blimp Rock =

Canadian band

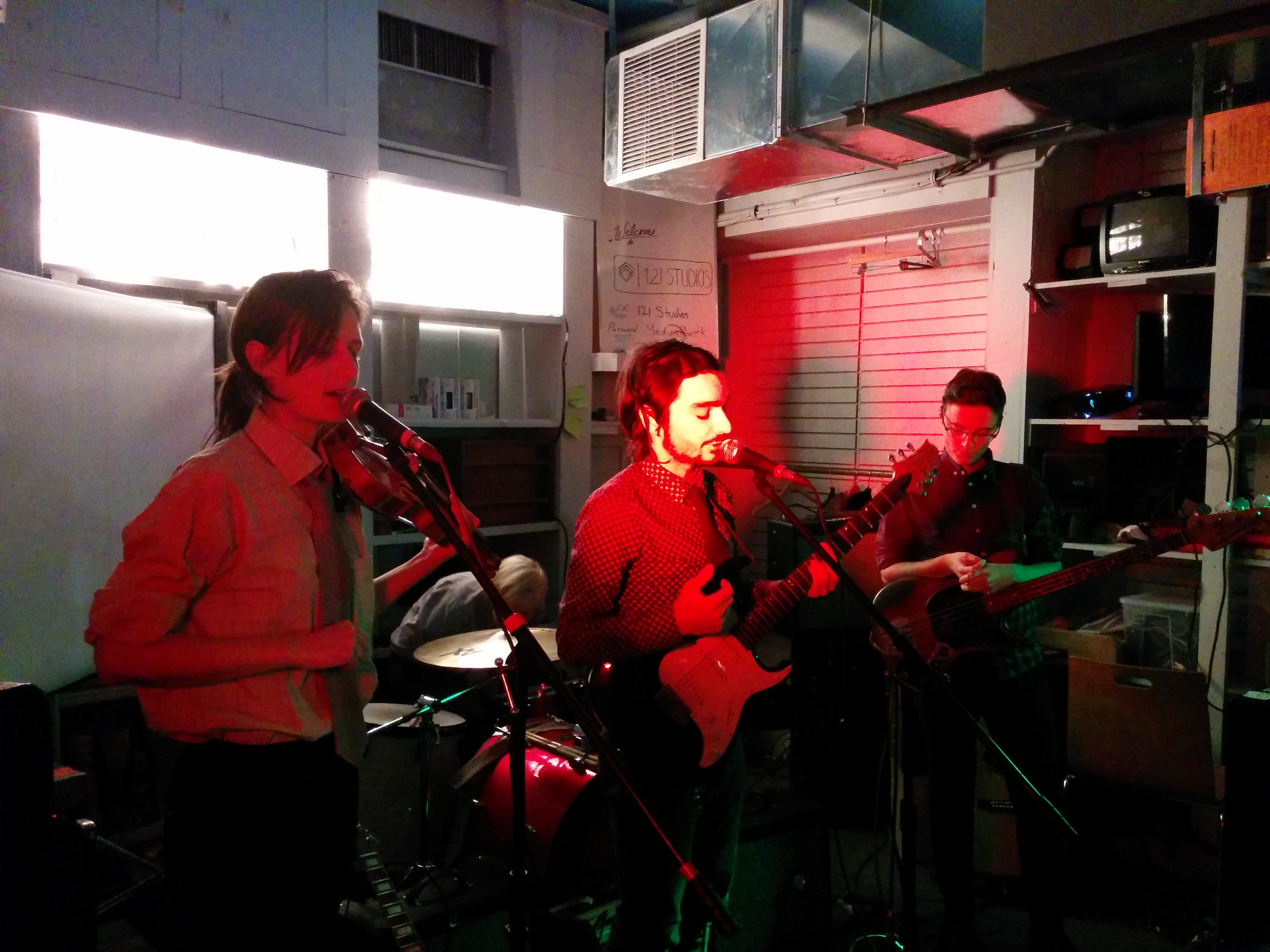

Background information
- Origin: Toronto, Ontario, Canada
- Genres: Indie rock Folk rock
- Labels: Label Fantastic!, Tree Machine Records
- Members: Peter Demakos Claire Whitehead; Emma Tollefsen Robyn Letson
- Website: blimprockenterprises.com

Blimp Rock is a Canadian band from Toronto, Ontario, Canada. Their music has been described as quirky and sincere and has been compared to Lou Reed, The Weakerthans, and Sufjan Stevens. Their live performances have been said to include a PowerPoint presentation and the selling of outdated office equipment.

== History ==
=== 2012 to present ===
The band claims it was recruited by a corporation known as "Blimp Rock Enterprises" in 2012 to raise funds for a concert in a blimp above Lake Ontario. The funding goal was set by the group at $700 000 which was the amount they claimed to require to launch the airborne concert.

In 2014, the band embarked upon a tour of Europe and Eastern Canada, culminating in a headlining performance at Paradiso in Amsterdam. Since then, they have performed alongside such acts as The Burning Hell, Elliott Brood, and Wax Mannequin.

In 2015, the album Sophomore Slump was released. The album received positive reviews from Exclaim! and Now Magazine. The single "Let's All Stay In Tonight" was chosen by CBC Music as a "Searchlight Standout" and charted on the CBC Radio 3 R3-30, peaking at number 22.

Soap Opera, the band's third album, was released June 16, 2017. According to Exclaim!, the album was the first ever recording to be issued inside bars of soap. Indie88 called the album's first single, "Dear Science", a "quirky, lovable single that truly does signal a fresh start for the band."

As of January 2016, the band had raised $-2388 of their $700,000 goal for a blimp concert.

=== Acquisition history ===
On January 4, 2016, Blimp Rock announced the "acquisition" of Phil Elvrum's band naming service. In exchange for $200, the name of the service was changed from Band Naming Services to Blimp Rock Enterprises Presents: Band Naming Services and Blimp Rock's logo was added to the website. Also as part of the deal, Elvrum tweeted the following haiku:

I still can't be bought
but I did just sell ad space
to a blimp concert

== Legal actions and controversies ==
=== Legal dispute with the Toronto Blue Jays ===
In October 2015, Blimp Rock requested royalties from the Toronto Blue Jays for their 2012 song "Oh Baseball." In a Facebook post, the group claimed to have invented the "Come Together" slogan adopted by the Major League Baseball team in February, 2015. While the royalty claim proved unsuccessful, the dispute led to a large amount of hate mail being sent to the band, ultimately providing them with the material for the music video "In The Doghouse."

== Discography ==
=== Albums ===
- Blimp Rock (2013)
- Sophomore Slump (2015)
- Soap Opera (2017)

== See also ==
- Music of Canada
- Canadian rock
- List of bands from Canada
