= Bleeding Rainbow =

- Also known as: Reading Rainbow
- Origin: Philadelphia, Pennsylvania, United States
- Genres: Indie rock, shoegaze, noise rock
- Years active: 2009-2015
- Labels: Kanine Records
- Past members: Rob Garcia; Sarah Everton; Al Creedon; Greg Frantz
- Website: bleeding-rainbow.tumblr.com

Bleeding Rainbow was an American, Philadelphia-based indie rock band, originally composed of singer/bassist Sarah Everton—also the drummer when they played as Reading Rainbow— and singer/guitarist Rob Garcia, though the group was expanded to include drummer Greg Frantz and lead guitarist Al Creedon. While still performing as a duo, Everton and Garcia released two full-length albums under the name Reading Rainbow, Mystical Participation, and Prism Eyes on HoZac Records. The band's third release and their first under their new moniker, Yeah Right, saw the band signing to Brooklyn-based label Kanine Records and embracing "bands from our teenage-hood." On February 25, 2014, Bleeding Rainbow released the full length titled "Interrupt", recorded with drummer Robi Gonzalez, though the supporting tour was made with drummer Ashley Arnwine.

On April 5, 2015, Bleeding Rainbow announced on their Facebook page that the band had decided to call it quits. The split was amicable, with the members all focusing on new projects.
