= Surfer Blood =

American indie rock band

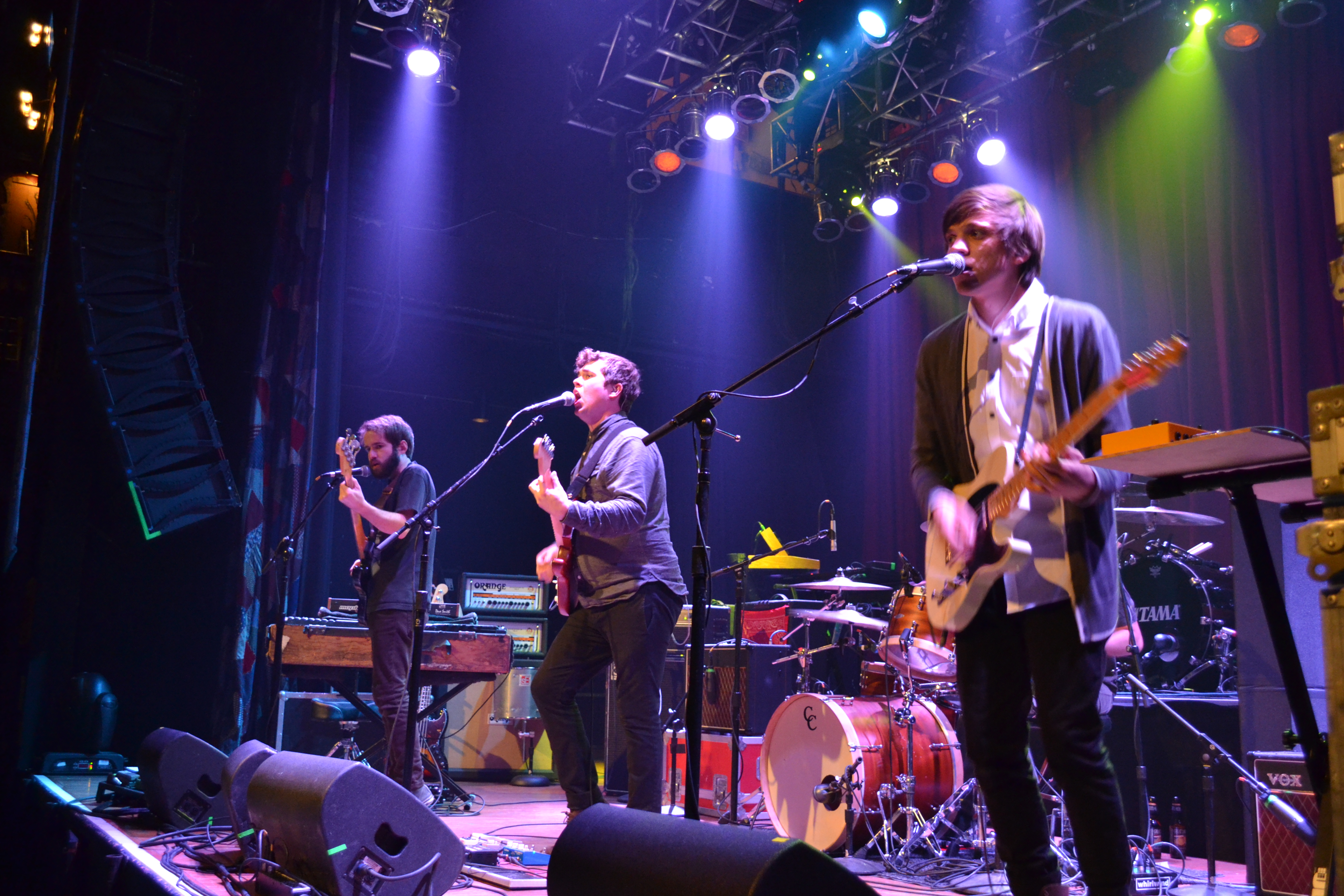
- Surfer Blood performing at the House of Blues in Cleveland in 2013

Background information
- Origin: West Palm Beach, Florida, United States
- Genres: Indie rock, post-punk revival, surf rock, alternative rock
- Years active: 2009–present
- Labels: Joyful Noise Recordings, Kanine, LAB 344 (South America), Warner Bros. Records, Fierce Panda (UK)
- Spinoff of: TV Club
- Members: John Paul Pitts; Tyler Schwarz; Mike McCleary; Lindsey Mills
- Past members: Kevin Williams; Thomas Fekete; Brian Black; Marcos Marchesani

Surfer Blood are an American rock band from West Palm Beach, Florida, currently signed to Kanine Records and formerly signed to both Joyful Noise Recordings and Warner Bros. Records. The band currently consists of singer/rhythm guitarist John Paul Pitts, drummer Tyler Schwarz, lead guitarist Mike McCleary and bassist Lindsey Mills.

== Formation ==
Founding members John Paul Pitts and Tyler Schwarz started playing music together in Orlando, Florida under the name Jabroni Sandwich.[1] They then moved back to their hometown of West Palm Beach, Florida and started playing with lead guitarist Luke Bovat and bassist Freddy Schwenk in 2008 under the name "TV Club." As this early incarnation of the group they developed most of the material that would end up on Surfer Blood's debut album, Astro Coast. TV Club lasted for about a year until Bovat was kicked out and Schwenk left the band. Around that time, Pitts and Schwarz met Thomas Fekete at an Ultra Music Festival after party in Miami and the group was renamed to Surfer Blood (a name that Schwarz randomly came up with during a conversation with Pitts about his surfer backpack from high school) with the immediate goal of releasing a record and touring nonstop.

== Career ==
The band's 2009 debut single, "Swim", gained much critical acclaim and was named as the 37th best track on Pitchfork's 100 Best Songs of 2009. They released their debut album, Astro Coast, in January 2010.

The band were widely considered to be the breakout band of 2009's CMJ Music Marathon. In March 2010, playing songs from their debut album, Astro Coast, Surfer Blood made quite a splash at the SXSW NPR music party (and returned to SXSW in 2011). In May 2010, the band played at the ATP music festival curated by Pavement along with other groups such as Broken Social Scene, The Walkmen, and Atlas Sound. Later that month, Surfer Blood headed over to Spain to join the lineup at the San Miguel Primavera Sound Festival. In August of that year, Surfer Blood finished out the summer playing two more festivals; Splendour in the Grass in Australia and Summer Sonic in Tokyo.

The band was chosen by Les Savy Fav to perform at the ATP Nightmare Before Christmas festival that they co-curated in December 2011 in Minehead, England.

On October 25, 2011, Surfer Blood released the Tarot Classics EP on Kanine Records. The EP's first single "Miranda" debuted on Pitchfork on August 30, 2011, and "I'm Not Ready" was named NPR's Song of the Day on December 8, 2011. Artists that contributed remixes to the EP include Totally Sincere (Connor Hanwick of the Drums and Peggy Wang of The Pains of Being Pure at Heart), Speculator, School of Seven Bells and Allen Blickle.

The band opened for the Pixies during their Doolittle Lost Cities Tour in 2011. The tour came about after Pitts met the Pixies in an airport in New Zealand and they said they were already familiar with Surfer Blood's music. Surfer Blood performed a cover of their song "Gigantic" for The A.V. Club's music-video series "AV Undercover" which Pitts says he'd like to think that was "the needle that broke the camel's back when it came to the decision" to tour with them.

On January 9, 2012, they appeared on Late Night with Jimmy Fallon where they performed the single "Miranda" off of Tarot Classics. The next day, news spread that the band would be entering the studio in February 2012 with producer Phil Ek (Fleet Foxes, Built to Spill) to record their highly anticipated second album which was released on Warner Bros. Records.

In May 2012, the band confirmed via their Twitter account that they were moving to California on May 12, 2012, to record their second album with legendary producer Gil Norton.

On January 21, 2013, they uploaded a new song off their next album, Pythons, called "Weird Shapes".

In February 2014, the band announced that work on their third record had begun.

On May 20, 2014, the band debuted a video of them playing a new song titled "Island". The song has been played before back in 2011, during various radio sessions.

On September 16, 2014, a new song titled "NW Passage" was debuted on SoundCloud, as part of their split single with We Are Scientists.

On February 17, 2015, the band announced their third album 1000 Palms and that it would be released on Fierce Panda / Joyful Noise Recordings on May 12. The lead single, "Dorian", was premiered on BBC Radio 1 at midnight.

Original lead guitarist Thomas Fekete left the band in 2015 shortly after the announcement of their third album, 1000 Palms, due to a medical diagnosis for a rare form of cancer (sarcoma) that had spread to his lungs and spine. He was diagnosed in the winter of 2014. The band announced a fundraising effort to help alleviate Thomas' medical bills through the site GoFundMe on April 20, 2015. On May 31, 2016, Fekete's wife Jessica announced that he had died.

In April 2015, the song "Swim" was featured in an episode of the Netflix series "Daredevil."

Surfer Blood shared the video for album track "Island" in June 2015, in support of "1000 Palms".

In October 2015, the band announced that their longtime bassist, Kevin Williams, was leaving the band to pursue a new job in Austin, Texas. The band later announced that their longtime friend from high school, Lindsey Mills, would be replacing Kevin on bass.

The band's fourth album, Snowdonia, was released on February 3, 2017. It is the first album the band has released following Fekete's death, and features Mills and guitarist Michael McCleary.

In October 2017, Surfer Blood released Covers, an album featuring cover versions of songs by Pavement, OutKast, and more. Following Covers, in 2019 the band released their second EP/10" vinyl called Hourly Haunts.

In January 2020, Surfer Blood announced that they would be releasing a new album called Carefree Theatre which was inspired by the historic landmark theater of the same name in West Palm Beach. The album is currently scheduled for release on September 25, 2020, according to the band's website, and marks the band's return to Kanine Records, the label that had put out Astro Coast 10 years earlier. A 10-year anniversary deluxe double LP version of Astro Coast was released by Kanine on Record Store Day, August 29, 2020.

== Legal problems ==
In March 2012, frontman John Paul Pitts was arrested for domestic battery in Lake Worth, Florida. He pled no contest and agreed to complete a court supervised program, rather than go to trial as it would interfere with his tour plans. All charges were eventually dropped.

== Members ==
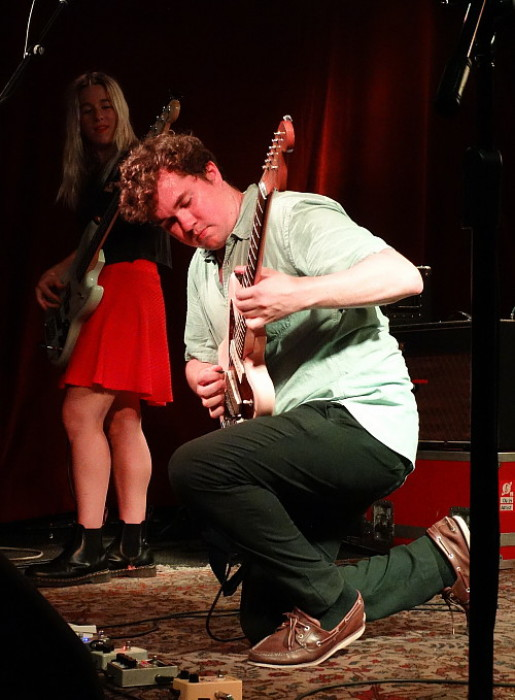
John Paul Pitts and Lindsey Mills of Surfer Blood performing at The Saint in Asbury Park, NJ, August 2017

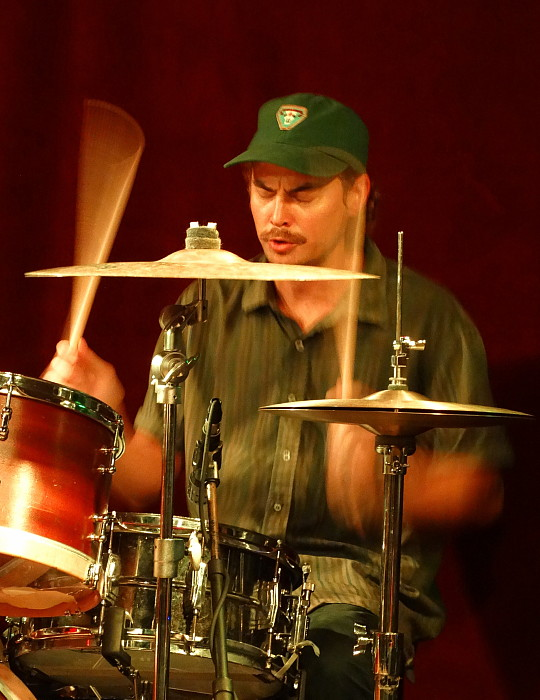
Tyler Schwarz of Surfer Blood at The Saint in Asbury Park, NJ, August 2017

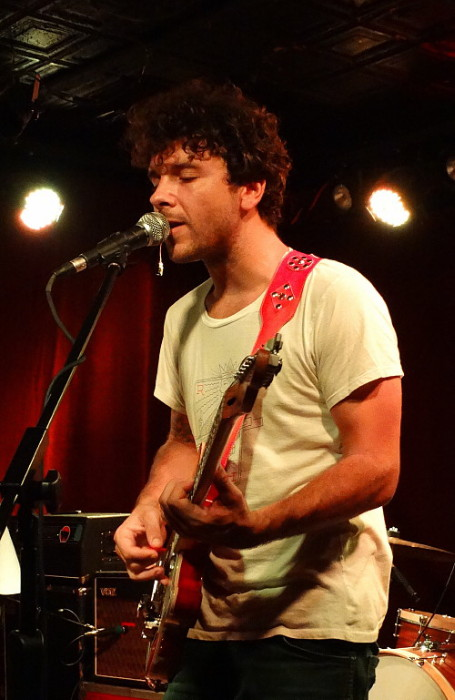
Mike McCleary of Surfer Blood performing at The Saint in Asbury Park, NJ, August 2017

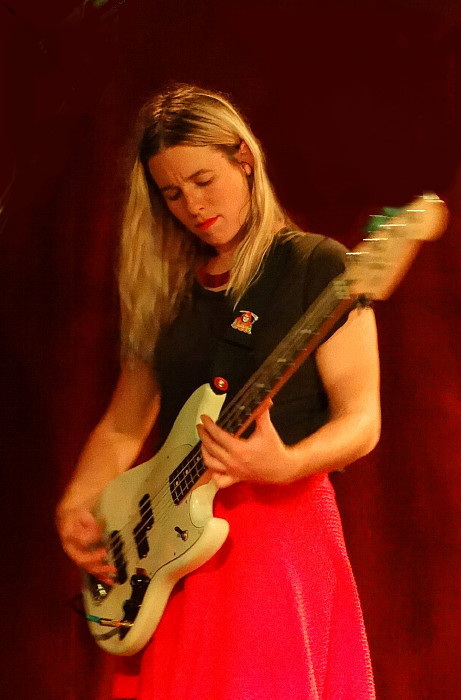
Lindsey Mills of Surfer Blood on stage at The Saint in Asbury Park, NJ, August 2017

Current members

- John Paul Pitts – lead vocals, rhythm guitar (2009–present)
- Tyler Schwarz – drums, percussion (2009–present)
- Mike McLeary – lead guitar, backing vocals (2015–present)
- Lindsey Mills – bass, backing vocals (2015–present)

Former members

- Marcos Marchesani – drums (2009-2012)
- Brian Black – bass, backing vocals (2009–2011)
- Thomas Fekete – lead guitar, backing vocals (2009–2015; died 2016)
- Kevin Williams – bass, keyboards, backing vocals (2011–2015)

== Discography ==
=== Albums ===
==== Studio albums ====
List of studio albums, with selected chart positions
Title	Album details	Peak chart positions					
Title	Album details	US	US Indie	US Rock	AUS Hit.	UK Indie Break.	UK Rec.
Astro Coast	Released: January 19, 2010; Label: Kanine	124	19	40	10	19	—
Pythons	Released: June 11, 2013; Label: Sire	127	—	39	10	—	37
1000 Palms	Released: May 12, 2015; Label: Joyful Noise	160	11	16	—	—	—
Snowdonia	Released: February 3, 2017; Label: Joyful Noise	— (Note: Snowdonia did not enter the US Billboard 200, but peaked at number 15 on the Top Heatseekers Albums Chart.)	—	—	—	—	—
Carefree Theatre	Released: September 25, 2020; Label: Kanine	—	—	—	—	—	—
"—" denotes a recording that did not chart or was not released in that territory.

==== Demo albums ====
List of demo albums, with selected chart positions
Title	Album details	Peak chart positions
Title	Album details	US Heat.
Pythons Demos	Released: April 19, 2014; Label: Kanine	43
"—" denotes a recording that did not chart or was not released in that territory.

==== Cover albums ====
List of cover albums
Title	Album details
Covers	Released: October 13, 2017; Label: Joyful Noise

=== EPs ===
List of EPs, with selected chart positions
Title	Album details	Peak chart positions		
Title	Album details	US Heat.	US Indie	US Rock
Tarot Classics	Released: October 25, 2011; Label: Kanine	5	46	48
Hourly Haunts	Released: August 16, 2019; Label: Persona Non Grata	—	—	—
Hard Boiled	Released: August 7, 2020; Label: Kanine	—	—	—
"—" denotes a recording that did not chart or was not released in that territory.

=== Singles ===
List of singles, with selected chart positions
Title	Year	Peak chart positions		Album
Title	Year	MEX Eng.	UK Sales	Album
"Swim"	2009	11	—	Astro Coast
"Slow Jabroni"	2009	—	—	Astro Coast
"Take It Easy"	2010	—	—	Astro Coast
"Floating Vibes"	2010	—	66	Astro Coast
"Miranda"	2011	45	—	Tarot Classics
"Demon Dance"	2013	—	—	Pythons
"Weird Shapes"	2013	—	—	Pythons
"Spanish Bombs"	2013	—	—	non-album single
"Grand Inquisitor"	2014	—	—	1000 Palms
"I Can't Explain"	2014	—	—	1000 Palms
"Women of Your Life"	2016	—	—	non-album single
"Six Flags in F or G"	2016	—	—	Snowdonia
"Frozen"	2017	—	—	Snowdonia
"Around Your Sun"	2019	—	—	Hourly Haunts
"Karen"	2020	—	—	Carefree Theatre
"Parkland (Into The Silence)"	2020	—	—	Carefree Theatre
"Summer Trope" (featuring Pip Blom)	2020	—	—	Hardboiled
"—" denotes a recording that did not chart or was not released in that territory.

==== Split singles ====
List of split singles, with notes, showing year released and album name
Title	Year	Notes
"Evil Cat" / "Bub the Builder"	2016	Limited edition split single with Lil Bub

== Appearances in media ==
- The band's song "Swim" is playable in the video game Power Gig: Rise of the SixString. "Swim" and "Floating Vibes" have also been released as downloadable content for the Rock Band video game series through its Rock Band Network service. "Floating Vibes" also appears in video game "Test Drive Unlimited 2". The band's song and music video for "Demon Dance" appears in the video game "Guitar Hero Live". The band's song "Fast Jabroni" appears in the television series "Community (TV series)" Season 1 Episode 25, titled "Pascal's Triangle Revisited" which originally aired 20 May 2010.
