= Blushing (band) =

Blushing is an American dream pop band from Austin, Texas. The band consists of two couples, vocalist and guitarist Michelle Soto, drummer Jacob Soto, vocalist and bassist Christina Carmona, and guitarist Noe Carmona. The band is currently signed to Kanine Records.

== History ==
Blushing began in 2017, when they recorded and released their first EP titled Tether. The group followed up that EP in 2018 with their second EP, Weak. The band released their debut self-titled album in 2019. The group's second full-length album, Possessions, was released in 2022. The album was produced by Elliott Frazier of Ringo Deathstarr. Mark Gardener of Ride also assisted in the making of the album. The album received positive reviews. The group's song "Blame" from the aforementioned album features Miki Berenyi, who discovered the band after they had recorded a cover of her band Lush's song "Out of Control".
