= Seven45 Studios =

- Type: Private
- Industry: Video Games
- Founded: 2007
- Headquarters: Boston, Massachusetts, U.S.
- Key people: Bernard Chiu (Chairman, CEO); Mark Izen (President, COO)
- Website: http://seven45studios.com

Seven45 Studios is the video game publishing & development division of First Act. The company's titles fuse innovative and entertaining gameplay with the world of music. It was reported to be defunct in 2013.

== History ==
Seven45 Studios was founded in 2007 as the video game division for First Act. Seven45 is perhaps best known as the developer and publisher of the critically panned 2010 title Power Gig: Rise of the SixString, a note-matching game that shipped with a unique guitar game controller that acts as both a standalone six-stringed guitar and game controller for this and other note-matching games. In late 2010 Seven45 Studios laid-off a large part of their staff "as a part of the natural cycle of game development and to focus on the development needs of its upcoming games projects". In 2011 Seven45 Studios changed focus to developing and producing iOS apps.

== Titles ==
Power Gig: Rise of the SixString, released in October 2010, is a video game console game for simulating gameplay with a real guitar. It was released simultaneously on Xbox 360 and PlayStation 3. The game was derided by critics due to its guitar not functioning perfectly and its padless drum kit having poor detection.

BeatPop, released in April 2011, in an iOS app, designed to be played on the Apple iPhone and iPod Touch. The player pops bubbles (via tapping the touch screen) to the beat of a variety of interesting and catchy original soundtracks.

Soulo, released in late 2011, is an iOS app for Karaoke designed to be played on the Apple iPhone, iPad, iPod Touch. The songs that can be downloaded directly to the app include a dynamic interactive display of the lyrics. These songs are all cover versions of original songs. Soulo also enables the user to sing along with existing songs in the iTunes library. The original vocals from these songs are suppressed via vocal remover technologies. Additional voice enhancements such as pitch correction are also included in the game play. These technologies were supplied by the audio technology company iZotope. The app is designed to work with a line of microphones and other peripherals made by Seven45 Studios' sister company, First Act.
