= Vows (band) =

- Origin: New Jersey, Vermont
- Genres: Indie, art rock, psychedelic rock, experimental
- Years active: 2011–present
- Labels: Tree Machine Records, Section Sign Records
- Website: vowsmusic.com

Vows is an indie, psychedelic band formed in New Jersey and Vermont in 2011 with their first release in April titled, Winter's Grave. The band got their start with a mention from NPR's Second Stage. They have since been performing across the U.S. and continuing to release new records. Signing with Tree Machine Records, an independent label out of Bloomington, IN and Section Sign Records based out of Burlington, VT, was the next move forward into more national recognition.

== Formation/history ==
=== Winter's Grave ===
Vows debut LP, Winter's Grave was released in April 2011. It's ambient psychedelia defines the inertia that gave the band its start and is still present in the composition and structure of later releases. The album was premiered on NPR's 2nd Stage, and so many times has the word 'dreamy' been associated with the band ever since.

In describing the Americana and folk roots that hide in the modern aural landscape of this group, Vows ideologies were even described as "deeply rooted and expressed in post 9/11 anxieties." Local to New Jersey, Vermont, New York, and all stretches of the east coast, the band members derive from a variety of backgrounds intensely inscribed in macro-cosmic relevancy. Winter's Grave, their first release to date, caught the most attention with its unique packaging, wrapped in burlap and neatly tided together with a black string.

=== Stranger Things ===
Follow up album, Stranger Things ...

=== Vows EP and 0 EP ===
Rather than releasing a third EP, the band experimented with the idea of 2 EP's on the same day. Both their self-titled EP, and an EP titled as simply the number 0, were shared on March 27, 2014. Each with elements of darker connotations, the albums marked a sort of falling out which was so perfectly described in the actuality of the music. An inevitable feeling of the more melancholy side of existence, Vows was truthful and sad, while 0 exemplified a more spiteful edge.

=== "Soon Enough Love LP" ===
"Soon Enough Love", their third full-length album, was released via vinyl and digital formats on June 2, 2015, by Section Sign Records, an indie label based in Winooski, Vermont.

== Discography ==
Albums

- Winter's Grave (2011)
- Stranger Things (2013)
- Soon Enough Love (2015)

EP's

- Vows EP (2014)
- O EP (2014)

Collaborations

- Hero EP (2014) w/ !mindparade
