= Princeton (band) =

American indie pop band

- Origin: Los Angeles, California, United States
- Genres: Indie rock Indie pop
- Years active: 2005 – present
- Labels: Striking Peasant Recordings; Kanine Records
- Members: Jesse Kivel; Matt Kivel; Ben Usen; David Kitz
- Website: princetonla.com

Princeton is an American indie pop band from Los Angeles, California, United States. The band consists of twin brothers Jesse (guitar, vocals) and Matt Kivel (bass, vocals), Ben Usen (keyboard) and David Kitz (drums). Princeton has received recognition for their live performances, often supporting high-profile indie acts such as Vampire Weekend, The Ruby Suns and Ra Ra Riot, as well as headlining in their own right.

== History ==
=== Formation and early releases (2005–2007) ===
The name of the band, Princeton, originated from band members growing up on Princeton Street in Santa Monica, California. Jesse and Matt Kivel, along with childhood friend Ben Usen, started playing music together in the late 1990s but officially formed the band in 2005, during a year long academic stay in London, which found the three reunited for the first time since parting ways for college.

Due to the steep costs of shipping their instruments overseas, the group was forced to perform live with a very limited musical setup, but the often-harrowing conditions of their London shows forced them to develop a finely tuned live act. The members of the band were each influenced by London in different ways; Jesse found interest in Virginia Woolf, Matt discovered John Cale’s Paris 1919 and the writings of John Maynard Keynes, and Ben briefly pursued a career in international finance. Despite having limited musical resources, the band recorded and self-released a record entitled A Case of the Emperor’s Clothes in 2006.

=== Move to Los Angeles (2007–2009) ===
After graduating from college in the summer of 2007, the three original band members moved to Los Angeles. The permanent settlement of the band allowed them to resume recording and performing full-time. With the addition of drummer David Kitz, Princeton first gained attention in 2008 with their four-song EP Bloomsbury, a conceptual record about the group of British intellectuals.

Princeton has received numerous positive reviews for their music, earning mentions from Spin, Stereogum and The New York Times among others. They have also gained popularity from supporting a number of popular acts, including Au Revoir Simone, Vampire Weekend, Saturday Looks Good to Me, Le Loup, The Ruby Suns, My Brightest Diamond, Grand Ole Party, Joan As Policewoman, Cryptacize, Phoenix, and Ra Ra Riot.

=== Debut album (2009–present) ===
Cocoon of Love, Princeton's debut album, was released September 29, 2009, on Kanine Records. The first single to be lifted from the album, "Shout it Out", was released on August 25, 2009. The band now reside in the Eagle Rock district of Los Angeles, where the album was recorded and produced.

On February 21, 2012, the band released their second album called Remembrance of Things to Come.

== Discography ==
=== Studio albums ===
- Cocoon of Love (2009)
- Remembrance of Things to Come (2012)

=== Extended plays ===
A Case of the Emperor's Clothes (2006)

All tracks are written by Jesse Kivel, Matt Kivel and Ben Usen.

No.	Title	Length
1.	"The Indifference Curve"	3:12
2.	"Tokyo, Japan"	3:13
3.	"Two Hands"	3:54
4.	"Blackbeard"	3:49
5.	"The Red Sweater"	3:40
6.	"They Sing in Her Heart"	3:44
7.	"By the Bear (Sleeping Souls)"	3:26

- Bloomsbury (2008)

All tracks are written by Jesse Kivel, Matt Kivel and Ben Usen.

No.	Title	Length
1.	"The Waves"	3:16
2.	"Ms. Bentwich"	3:19
3.	"Leonard Woolf"	4:01
4.	"Eminent Victorians"	2:22

=== Singles ===
- "Shout It Out" (2009)

All tracks are written by Jesse Kivel, Matt Kivel, Ben Usen and David Kitz.

No.	Title	Length
1.	"Shout It Out"	2:41
2.	"Moonbeams"	2:31

- "Clamoring for Your Heart" (2011)

All tracks are written by Jesse Kivel, Matt Kivel, Ben Usen and David Kitz.

No.	Title	Length
1.	"Clamoring For Your Heart"	5:35
2.	"The Weather, A Swimmer"	4:11

- "To the Alps" (2011)

All tracks are written by Jesse Kivel, Matt Kivel, Ben Usen and David Kitz except where noted.

No.	Title	Writer(s)	Length
1.	"To the Alps"		3:21
2.	"The Electrician Active Child" (featuring Active Child)	Scott Walker	4:33
