= First Act =

Musical instruments manufacturer

First Act Inc.
- Type: Subsidiary
- Industry: Musical instruments
- Founded: 1995
- Headquarters: Boston, Massachusetts, U.S.,
- Key people: Bernard Chiu (Chairman)
- Parent: Jazwares
- Website: https://firstact-guitar.com/

First Act was a manufacturer of musical instruments and musical learning toys, that produced guitars, bass guitars, guitar and bass accessories, drum sets, percussion instruments, and amplifiers. Mark Izen founded the company in 1995; its online presence first appeared early in 2000.

Despite being officially based in Boston, Massachusetts, at its peak First Act maintained offices in Bentonville, Hong Kong, and Shenzhen, and a "custom shop" luthiery in Somerville, Massachusetts.

In 2016, First Act was acquired by toy manufacturer Jazwares.

== Founding ==
First Act was largely an unrelated result of the successful sale of Duracraft to the Consumer Products division of Honeywell in 1996. Bernard Chiu, the founder of Duracraft, was offered a leadership role at First Act, Inc. after selling his company; he accepted, thus establishing the company's leadership hierarchy. As a significant portion of First Act, Inc. leadership were previous Duracraft employees, there were no dedicated musicians. Instead, they relied on their experience with generic commodity-level small appliances.

== Product lines ==
The company's products were divided into two lines, with very similar entries but sold toward different audiences. They were marketed through large retail chains, particularly Toys "R" Us and Target, as well as Amazon.com.

First Act proper was shaped toward inexpensive "beginner" instruments intended for children and adults. The small range was primarily a basic three-piece drum kit, a soprano ukulele, three dynamic-type microphones, and five guitars, both full-size (acoustic and electric) and short-scale (marketed both as "sized for kids" and as a travel guitar).

Paralleling this line was First Act Discovery (sometimes just Discovery), musical products for children ages 3 to 9. This line included acoustic guitars, ukuleles, drums, electronic percussion pads, tambourines, recorders, keyboards, and electronic button-controlled "guitars." There was also a series of plastic microphone-like products, largely with sounds and graphics licensed from Disney, including Nickelodeon, DreamWorks, and Marvel properties. More recently, to maximize the ukulele fad, a series of Disney-graphic instruments (albeit marketed as "mini guitars") was released, such as the AV285 Avengers uke.

An ambitious series of projects and products was eliminated after First Act's 2012 peak.

- First Act Instruments — the original retail line of entry-level instruments for teens and adults, including guitars, drums, hand percussion, and accessories.
- Mark II — intended in First Act's early years to become the quality line. The name isn't mentioned after 2003.
- Concert Series — a range of inexpensive band instruments marketed to grade-school students.
- 222 — in 2008, First Act partnered with Adam Levine (lead vocalist and guitarist of Maroon 5) to produce 222 by First Act, a line of 22 music products, including an acoustic guitar and a "signature" model of electric guitar designed by Levine, branded "222" (his lucky number). The line was sold through Target stores.
- Fuel — successor to First Act Instruments, intended to distance this chain store presence (largely Walmart and Target) from the company's expanding quality lines.
- Studio For Artists (SFA) — designed and built custom guitars and violins for professional musicians. Each instrument was handcrafted, and finished in First Act's Boston studio.
- SFA Edition Guitars — standard First Act guitars with added custom appointments, such as premium pickups, upgraded machine heads, and unique pickguards.
- Limited Edition Guitars — three Limited Edition models were created in the SFA facility: the "Lola", "Sheena", and "Delia." Guitar Player magazine praised the instruments for their stylistic innovation, unique appearance and excellent workmanship.

== Related facilities ==
First Act Guitar Studio was a real-world storefront at 745 Boylston Street, Boston, offering various First Act Custom, Limited Edition, SFA Edition, and First Act series electric and acoustic guitars, and accessories. Customers could play the guitars, watch a luthier crafting custom guitars, see a live show, or have their guitar serviced.

== Endorsers and users ==
In 2011, the First Act website claimed endorsements from 136 guitar players, including Brad Whitford (Aerosmith), Rusty Anderson (Paul McCartney), Matt Pike (High on Fire), Lyn-Z (Mindless Self Indulgence), Brent Hinds and Bill Kelliher (Mastodon), Nick Zinner (Yeah Yeah Yeahs), Al Berry (Avril Lavigne), Nick McCarthy (Franz Ferdinand), Lee Malia (Bring Me the Horizon), Dave Knudson (Minus the Bear), Anders Björler (At The Gates), Adam Gardner (Guster), Tim McTague and James Smith (Underoath), and Serj Tankian (System of a Down). Most of them played variations on the three top-line First Act models, the "Lola", "Sheena", and "Delia." As well, there were the models designed in collaboration with Paul Westerberg and Adam Levine, respectively the PW580 and the 222.

== Partnerships and promotions ==
First Act distributed branded calendars to Guitar Player subscribers in 2006 and 2007. The 2006 edition highlighted Studio for Artists guitars, including custom and limited-edition models.

First Act collaborated with two Red Sox players as a charity fund-raiser. Guitars were designed for pitchers Curt Schilling and Jonathan Papelbon after the players sketched their rough ideas, and First Act's design and custom shop teams brought the guitars to life. The customized guitars were auctioned off at a "Hot Stove Cool Music" concert fund-raiser at Fenway Park. The two guitars raised a total of $12,000 for Theo Epstein's charity.

In 2007, First Act introduced a Paul Westerberg signature guitar called the PW58, featuring a plaid pickguard and a custom body shape designed in the Studio for Artists facility.

First Act partnered with automaker Volkswagen for a 2006 promotional campaign to distribute "GarageMaster" guitars with selected vehicle models through the end of the year. The campaign ran from October 3 through December 31. GarageMaster guitars were available in white, red, and blue to those who purchased a VW. The stereos in these Volkswagens could be used as an amplifier for the guitar. Accompanying advertisements featured guitarists Slash, John Mayer, and Nigel Tufnel of Spinal Tap playing First Act guitars through the sound systems of Volkswagens. The GarageMaster model featured a battery-powered on-board preamp, knobs decorated with the "VW" logo, pickguards matching the vehicle's color, a metal plate inscribed with the corresponding vehicle's VIN, and could be plugged directly into the vehicles' audio systems using a minijack cable.

== Consumer electronics ==
In 2010, a video game division of First Act, Seven45 Studios, released Power Gig: Rise of the SixString. Peripherals included a functional electric guitar with controller buttons, a microphone, and a motion sensor system to simulate drums. Seven45 subsequently produced a number of music-based iOS apps.

In 2011 First Act released an iOS app for iPad and iPhone for karaoke under the Disney license called "Disney Spotlight Karaoke." It includes sing-a-longs with songs from Disney Channel stars and the ability to record and upload a video. First Act also released a line of Disney-themed microphones designed to work with the app.

In 2012 First Act released an iOS app for iPhone and iPad called "Notes to Grow On" which is a companion educational app for the Discovery line of instruments.

In October 2012, First Act launched a line of consumer electronics including charging, music, and audio interfaces for iPods, iPads, and iPhones, under the name BlueFlame Technologies.

== Criticism ==
The company received criticism from music educators who claimed that First Act band instruments, targeted at beginning students, were of low quality and often unrepairable, and that replacement parts were difficult to acquire.

In 2003, First Act sued the music retailer Brook Mays for false advertising after the retailer distributed marketing materials to school band directors that criticized First Act's products as "instrument-shaped objects", which induced returns of First Act products. First Act was awarded $16.7 million to compensate for lost profits, a judgment that effectively bankrupted Brook Mays.
