= Théo Lefebvre =

You Are Number Six
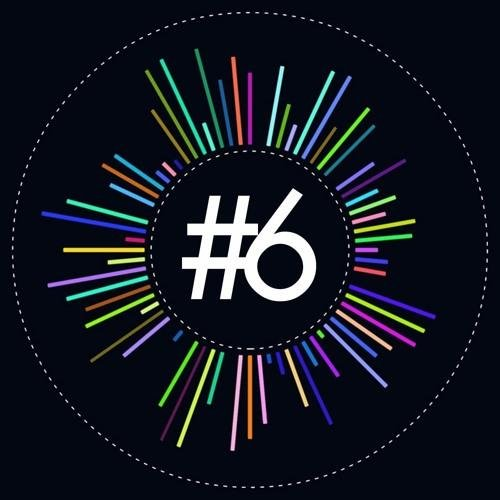

Background information
- Origin: Montpellier, France
- Genres: New wave, indie, post-punk
- Years active: 2013–present
- Labels: Tree Machine Records, Emerald and Doreen, Young Cubs, Slynt Records
- Website: you-are-number-six.com

You Are Number Six is the indie, new wave solo musical project of French producer, musician and songwriter Théo Lefebvre, based in Montpellier, France. The musical project started in 2014 with his first release in June titled, Weird Tales, produced by Young Cubs and which was featured on SoundCloud's Discover page and warmly welcomed by famous indie blogs such as Obscure Sound or Indie Hoy. You Are Number Six has since released six EPs, including Lensflares on Emerald and Doreen Records in 2015, and VHS Dreams on Tree Machine Records in 2016.

== Formation/history ==
Théo Lefebvre was born on June 6, 1993, and studied English literature in Montpellier before starting his musical project You Are Number Six in 2013. The name of the project is a reference to the 60s series The Prisoner and the famous sentence from the opening sequence. He is also the co-founder of the French record label Slynt Records, which has released various EPs from Heclysma, Kapitals and Gliese & Kepler.

== Discography ==
=== EPs ===
- Weird Tales (June 2014) – Young Cubs Records
- Hors-Série (May 2015) – Slynt Records
- Lensflares (June 2015) – Emerald & Doreen Records
- Summer Ends (August 2015) – Slynt Records
- Don't You Like My New Lipstick? (January 2016) – Slynt Records
- VHS Dreams (July 2016) – Tree Machine Records
- Androgynes (July 2017) – Slynt Records

=== Singles ===
- Magic (June 2014) – Young Cubs Records
- Palimpsest (June 2015) – Emerald & Doreen Records
- L.V.E.U (January 2016) – Slynt Records
- This Glimpse Of You (November 2016) – Slynt Records
