= Professor Murder =

American dance-punk band

- Origin: New York City, New York, United States
- Genres: Indie rock; dance-punk
- Labels: Kanine Records, RCRD LBL
- Members: Jesse Cohen; Andy Craven; Michael Bell-Smith; Tony Blankets
- Website: http://www.professormurder.com

Professor Murder is a dance-punk quartet from New York City that mixes synthesizers and percussion-based compositions in a method that has drawn comparison to post-punk and new wave bands of the late 1970s and early 1980s. They released their critically hailed debut EP, Professor Murder Rides the Subway, on Kanine Records in July 2006. Members of the band are Jesse Cohen (keyboards), Andy Craven (drums), Michael Bell-Smith (vocals, percussion, bass, keys), and Tony Blankets (bass, melodica). In 2009 Bell-Smith, Cohen and Blankets joined with Eric Emm of Tanlines to create a new band, Restless People.

== Name origin ==
Professor Murder was a character played by the British actor and model Sam Sarpong in two comedy sketches on HBO's "Mr. Show with Bob and David" in the 1990s. He was a rapper who was featured in a sketch about the East Coast ventriloquists' feud with the West Coast ventriloquists, which mirrored the same regional divide in the world of rap music. Professor Murder made a second appearance in another sketch as a ringer brought in by the rich kids from the fat camp when they wanted to win a rapping contest against a group of Buddhist monks. It has been said that this Mr. Show character's name inspired the band's name.

== Discography ==
EPs

- Professor Murder on a Desert Island (2008) RCRDLBL
- Professor Murder Rides the Subway (2006) Kanine Records
- Professor Murder Vs. The Magazine Culture (2004)

Singles

- "Dutch Hex" (2007) Brothers Label
