= Air instrument =

Form of dance and movement

In the context of musical performance, air instruments refers to the miming of sound-producing-gestures used in playing musical instruments. Simply put, air instruments are imaginary. Examples of air instruments include but are not limited to:

- air guitar – for electric guitar or acoustic guitar;
- air bass – for bass guitar;
- air drums – for snare drums, bongos or bass drum, or most commonly air drum set often with double bass pedals;
- air keyboards – such as air piano for piano;
- air violin – for violin or cello;
- air flute – for flute (or piccolo);
- air xylophone – for the xylophone;
- air trumpet – for trumpet (as opposed to car/boat air trumpet horns);
- air trombone – for trombone.

== Origins ==
The playing of air instruments has been documented through the 20th century (see: Air guitar). However, no sources have been found that exclude the playing of air instruments in ancient times, during private performances, such as for air flute or air lyre (for lyres or harps). One gesture musical instrument which won first place in the 2008 Chicago Makers Faire at the Chicago's Museum of Science and Industry is an instrument named Airheads that demonstrates the ability to simulate different musical instrument using only your hand gestures moving in the air.

== Air piano ==
For the air piano, both left and right hands can be used, as well as moving the feet to mimic pressing the piano floor pedals.

Besides the imaginary air piano, there is a motion-activated musical instrument interface called an "AirPiano" which is controlled by waving the hands above the top.

The AirPiano is a musical computer interface (from 2007) which allows playing and controlling software instruments simply by moving hands in the air over the device, connected by USB cable. Above the AirPiano is an invisible matrix of virtual keys plus faders, each pre-assigned with MIDI messages and waiting to be triggered, via infrared sensors. The length of each triggered note is determined by the time the hand is placed over the corresponding virtual key. Beyond the feedback of the sounds changing, hand placement is also confirmed by LED feedback. The first version of AirPiano generated polyphonic sound, with 24 keys using 8 faders.

The AirPiano software provides for the loading/saving of presets and transposing notes. The AirPiano technique has been filed as a Provisional U.S. Patent Application (Number: 60/989,986).

== Air violin ==
Besides the gestures to accompany real violin performances, playing the air violin can also be a form of sarcasm, to indicate that another person seems to be rambling with a sob story or whining excessively, in self-pity.
