= Astro Coast =

Studio album by Surfer Blood
- Released: January 19, 2010
- Recorded: 2009
- Genre: Indie rock, post-punk revival, surf rock
- Length: 40:29
- Label: Kanine
- Producer: John Paul Pitts

Surfer Blood chronology
Astro Coast (2010)	Tarot Classics (2011)

Singles from Astro Coast
- 1. "Swim" Released: August 28, 2009

Professional ratings
Aggregate scores
Source	Rating
AnyDecentMusic?	7.5/10
Metacritic	79/100
Review scores
Source	Rating
AllMusic	4/5 stars
The A.V. Club	B+
Consequence of Sound	4/5 stars
Mojo	4/5 stars
MSN Music (Consumer Guide)	A−
NME	7/10
Pitchfork	8.2/10
Q	4/5 stars
Rolling Stone	3.5/5 stars
Spin	8/10

Astro Coast is the debut album by American indie rock band Surfer Blood. It was released January 19, 2010, on Kanine Records.

Astro Coast received very positive reviews. The album peaked at number 124 on the Billboard 200 chart.

== Track listing ==
All tracks are written by John Paul Pitts, Thomas Fekete and Tyler Schwarz.

No.	Title	Length
1.	"Floating Vibes"	4:00
2.	"Swim"	3:18
3.	"Take It Easy"	3:56
4.	"Harmonix"	4:45
5.	"Neighbour Riffs"	2:08
6.	"Twin Peaks"	3:37
7.	"Fast Jabroni"	3:03
8.	"Slow Jabroni"	6:05
9.	"Anchorage"	6:25
10.	"Catholic Pagans"	3:12
Total length:		40:29

Japan edition bonus tracks
No.	Title	Length
11.	"Swim" (Demo Version)
12.	"Swim" (Allen Blickle of Baroness Remix)
13.	"Take It Easy" (Live) (featuring Marnie Stern)
14.	"Take It Easy" (Lars Stalfors Edit)

== Personnel ==
Surfer Blood

- John Paul Pitts – vocals, guitar, string arrangements, engineering, production
- Thomas Fekete – guitar, vocals
- Tyler Schwarz – drums
- Brian Black – bass, vocals

Additional personnel

- Kevin Williams – guitar (track 3)
- Freddy Schwenk Sr. – flute
- Emily Dwyer – strings
- Brenda Hollingsworth – mastering
- Ryan Copt – engineering
- Garth Warner – cover art
- Julia Pitts – cover art
- Jason Rueger – design, layout

== Charts ==
Chart (2010)	Peak position
US Billboard 200	124
US Independent Albums (Billboard)	19
US Heatseekers Albums (Billboard)	2
US Top Rock Albums (Billboard)	40
