= Brook Mays =

American musical instrument retailer

Brook Mays Music Co. Inc.
- Company type: Private
- Industry: Musical instruments
- Founded: Dallas, Texas (August 1901)
- Founder: Brook Mays
- Headquarters: Dallas, Texas, U.S.
- Number of locations: five retail locations plus one office/showroom
- Key people: Jim Tener (COO)
- Products: Guitars; Musical instruments
- Services: Instrument rentals
- Website: http://brookmays.com

Brook Mays Music Company, known generally as Brook Mays, is a Dallas, Texas-based retailer of musical instruments, sheet music, and supplies for individuals, bands and orchestras.

== History ==
Brook Mays was founded by its namesake investor, Brook Mays, who saw the opportunity to open a piano dealership in Dallas, and opened the chain's original store in August 1901. At the time, it dealt exclusively in pianos, and became the largest such dealership in its region. Brook Mays was the only major music company in the area to survive the Great Depression.

In the 1940s, the company expanded its wares to include organs, sheet music, and band instruments. Extensive remodeling following World War II until the early 1950s led to expansion in the downtown Dallas store, which fostered the development of its band instrument division. It became the largest supplier of band instruments to school groups in the southern United States. Brook Mays often had partnerships with school districts, and offered them bulk discounts.

The company grew rapidly with renewed interest in electrical instruments, and had over 50 stores, plus a mail-order and e-commerce division to serve international customers. Each store had access to extensive instrument repair facilities, as well as the largest instrument rental service in the southwest United States.

Brook Mays' slogan is "Brook Mays means music".

In 2003 First Act Inc., a competitor that sells its instruments at mass market retailers sued Brook Mays and was awarded $16.7 million. According to First Act, Brook Mays discouraged patrons from buying First Act's very inexpensive instruments. This claim was based on a flyer that Brook Mays sent out to band directors and consumers. In 2006, a judge awarded First Act the full amount of their claim. In July 2006, Brook Mays Music Group filed for Chapter 11 bankruptcy, citing poor back-to-school and holiday sales.

In August 2006, after 105 years of business, the liquidation of Brook Mays was ordered. Private investment company Oak Point Partners acquired the remnant assets, consisting of any known and unknown assets that weren't previously administered, from the Brook Mays Music Company Bankruptcy Estate on December 1, 2010.

Effective December 1, 2006, a new entity began operating at least one of the old Brook Mays music stores, using the name Brook Mays. The entity now operates five retail stores (two in the Dallas/Fort Worth Metroplex plus the company office and showroom, and three in the Greater Houston area). The store continues to rent band instruments to schools.
