= Living Hour =

Canadian indie rock band

- Origin: Winnipeg, Manitoba, Canada
- Genres: indie rock; dream pop; shoegaze
- Years active: 2013-present
- Labels: Lefse Records; Kanine Records
- Members: Sam Sarty; Gilad Carroll; Adam Soloway; Brett Ticzon; Isaac Tate
- Past members: Alex Chochinov
- Website: livinghourband.com

Living Hour is a Canadian indie rock band from Winnipeg, Manitoba.

== History ==
Living Hour formed in 2013, with their first release being a The White Stripes cover. In 2015, the band released their first song on a four way split. The following year, the band released their self-titled debut album on Lefse Records. In 2019, the band released their second full-length album in 2019 titled Softer Faces on Kanine Records. The track "I Sink I Sink" appeared on the Season 1 soundtrack of Never Have I Ever. In 2022, the band released their third full-length album titled Someday Is Today on Kanine Records. In 2025, the band released their fourth full-length album titled Internal Drone Infinity on multiple labels: Keeled Scales, PaperBag and Beloved.

Jeff Tweedy (Wilco) performed with Living Hour at the Solid Sound Festival in North Adams Massachusetts in June 2026.

Big Shadow (from Internal Drone Infinity) was added to the video game EA Sports skate in October 2026.

== Discography ==
=== Studio albums ===
- Living Hour (2016)
- Softer Faces (2019)
- Someday Is Today (2022)
- Internal Drone Infinity (2025)
- Magnet (2026)

== Music Videos ==
- Texting (2025)
- Best I Did It (2025)
- Waiter (2025)
- Wheel (2025)
- Middle Name (2022)
- Hold Me in Your Mind (2022)
- Feelings Meeting (2022)
- No Body (2022)
- Miss Miss Miss (2022)
- Tulips at My Bedside (2021)
- Double Bus (2021)
- I Sink I Sink (2020)
