= 1000 Palms =

Studio album by Surfer Blood
- Released: May 12, 2015
- Studio: Tyler Schwarz' parents' house and Echo Beach Studios in Jupiter, Florida
- Genre: Indie rock, surf rock, lo-fi
- Length: 37:11
- Label: Joyful Noise
- Producer: John Paul Pitts, Surfer Blood

Surfer Blood chronology
Pythons (2013)	1000 Palms (2015)	Snowdonia (2017)

Professional ratings
Aggregate scores
Source	Rating
Metacritic	62/100
Review scores
Source	Rating
Allmusic	3/5 stars
Consequence of Sound	C+
Paste	(5.0/10)
Pitchfork	(6.6/10)
PopMatters	4/10 stars

1000 Palms is the third studio album by Floridian surf rock band Surfer Blood. It was released on May 12, 2015, under Joyful Noise Recordings.

== Track listing ==
No.	Title	Length
1.	"Grand Inquisitor"	2:38
2.	"Island"	3:44
3.	"I Can't Explain"	4:24
4.	"Feast – Famine"	3:13
5.	"Point of No Return"	3:15
6.	"Saber-Tooth & Bone"	3:43
7.	"Covered Wagons"	3:26
8.	"Dorian"	4:25
9.	"Into Catacombs"	1:41
10.	"Other Desert Cities"	2:57
11.	"NW Passage"	4:32

== Personnel ==
- John Paul Pitts – vocals, guitar, producer
- Thomas Fekete – guitar
- Kevin Williams – bass, keyboard
- Tyler Schwarz – drums
- Michael McCleary – cornet, trombone
- Surfer Blood – producers
- Mark Chalecki – mastering
- Brian Rosemeyer – engineer
- Rob Schnapf – mixing
- Ray Holzknecht – drum engineering
- Julia Pitts – cover art
- Heidi Vaughan-Greenwood – layout

== Charting ==
Chart (2015)	Peak position
US Billboard 200	160
US Top Alternative Albums (Billboard)	13
US Heatseekers Albums (Billboard)	2
US Independent Albums (Billboard)	11
US Top Rock Albums (Billboard)	16
US Indie Store Albums Sales (Billboard)	10
