= Kanine Records =

Independent record label in Brooklyn, New York

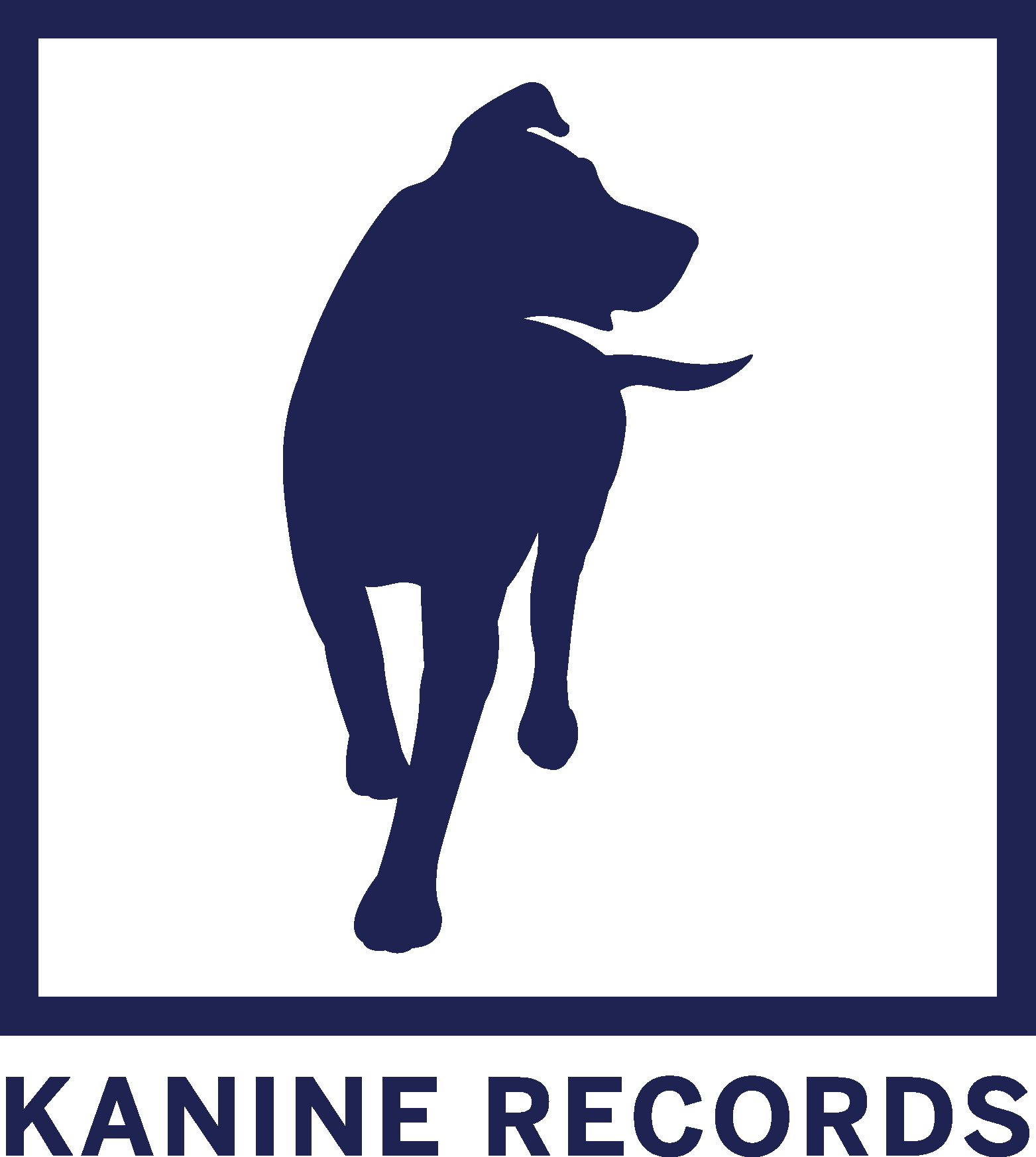
- Founded: 2002
- Founder: Lio Cerezo · Kay Quartararo
- Distributor: Secretly Distribution
- Genre: Indie rock
- Country of origin: United States
- Location: Brooklyn, New York
- Official website: www.kaninerecords.com

Kanine Records is an independent record label based in the Williamsburg section of Brooklyn, New York started at the end of 2002 by Lio and Kay Kanine. Their first release, NY: The Next Wave, was a 20 track compilation featuring mostly unsigned and emerging acts from the area. From there, they started to sign local bands and release CD EPs, 12-inch vinyl and eventually full-length records. The label remains independent and continues to grow due to the ongoing success of artists like Grizzly Bear, Chairlift, and Surfer Blood. Recent and upcoming releases include albums by The Natvral (Kip Berman from The Pains Of Being Pure At Heart), Pearl Charles, Hoorsees, Lucid Express, and VEPS.

== Roster ==
=== Current artists ===
- Agent blå
- Blushing
- Braids
- Chairlift
- Diary
- Eternal Summers
- Fear of Men
- Garden Centre
- Grizzly Bear
- Hockey Dad
- Honey Cutt
- Honey Lung
- Hoorsees
- Las Robertas
- Living Hour
- Lucid Express
- Nicole Yun
- Pearl Charles
- Pinact
- Splashh
- Skywave
- Surfer Blood
- Tallies
- The Blow
- The Depreciation Guild
- The Natvral
- Veps
- Weaves
- Weeping Icon
- Young Prisms

=== Former artists ===
- Blind Man's Colour
- Beach Day (band)
- Beverly (band)
- Bleeding Rainbow
- Dinowalrus
- Dream Diary
- Drink Up Buttercup
- Expert Alterations
- Flowers
- Four Volts
- Grooms
- Holy Hail
- The iOs
- The Izzys
- Jean on Jean
- Leave The Planet
- Mixel Pixel
- Mommy and Daddy
- Northern State
- Oxford Collapse
- Pepper Rabbit
- Princeton
- Professor Murder
- Rockethouse
- September Girls
- Shock Cinema
- The Flesh
- Valleys
- Viernes
- ZAZA

== See also ==
- List of record labels
