= Afar (album) =

Studio album by Ice Choir
- Released: July 31, 2012
- Recorded: 2011; Winter Station (Brooklyn, New York)
- Genres: Dream pop; synthpop; sophisti-pop
- Label: Underwater Peoples
- Producer: Kurt Feldman

Ice Choir chronology
Afar (2012)	Designs in Rhythm (2016)

Singles from Afar
- 1. "Two Rings" / "The Ice Choir" Released: November 15, 2011; 2. "Teletrips" Released: May 9, 2012; 3. "I Want You Now And Always" Released: June 12, 2012

Afar is the debut studio album of Ice Choir, the project of former the Pains of Being Pure at Heart drummer and the Depreciation Guild lead Kurt Feldman. It was released on July 31, 2012, by Underwater Peoples. It received mostly positive reviews from critics, with positive reviews highlighting Feldman's use of the 1980s influences and more varied responses criticizing the cheesiness.

== Production ==
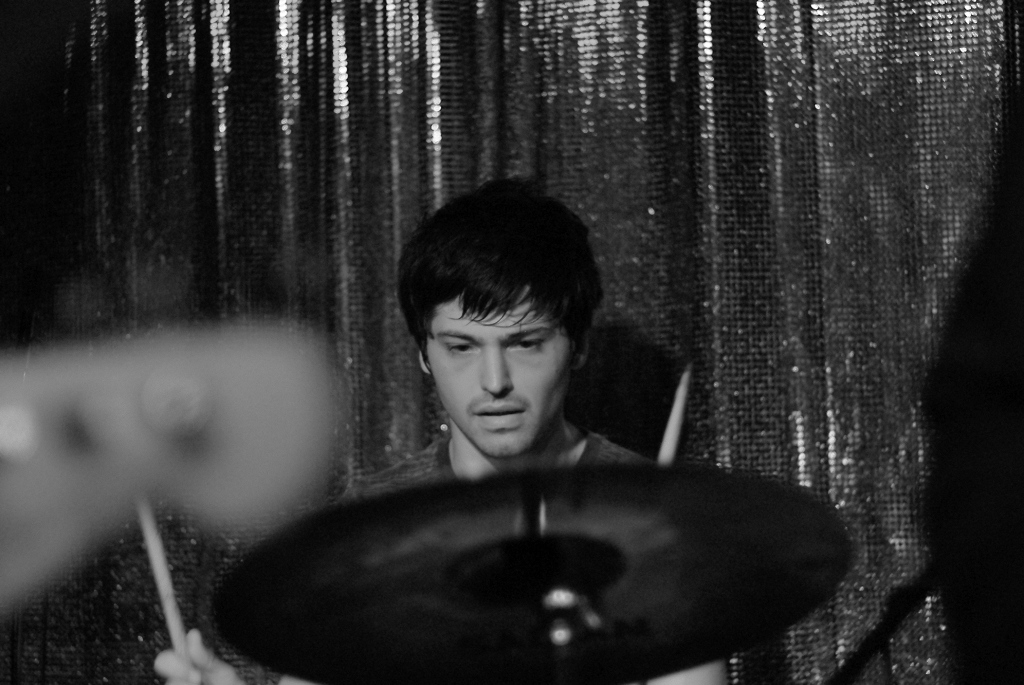
Ice Choir frontman Kurt Feldman performing with The Pains of Being Pure at Heart in 2009.

Towards the end of the Depreciation Guild, Kurt Feldman began writing music without any of the NES programming of the band's previous works, and the other members also started losing interest and focus of the project. Considering that it was much more "guitar-pop" than Ice Choir, there were certain limitations and aspects in writing that Feldman did not want to go through, so he decided to try new things and start over with a new project. Afar was written from October 2010 to May 2011 while on tour, with "The Ice Choir" as the first song written.

Afar was produced from May 2011 to January 2012, Jorge Elbrecht mixed the record at Static Recording from November to December 2011, before being mastered by Jaakko Viitalähde. It is primarily a synthesizer-based record, with 90% of it being programmed by Feldman using MIDI. He described making the album as "a really interesting experience", considering he wrote stuff for guitar before: "I had some experience with this very obscure form of electronic music production which is known as trackers. It’s closer to programming than it is actually interacting with a keyboard instrument. It’s pretty far removed from actually composing, which I guess helped me get over the learning curve of MIDI. It was kind of easy for me to do it, but it was definitely a weird approach."

== Composition ==
The official press release from Underwater Peoples explains Afar "challenges conventional perceptions of 80s technopop, highlighting its musically progressive and literate roots and re-imagining them to create a startlingly original sound", also noting elements of italo disco, avant-garde pop, classical music and smooth R&B. Feldman have claimed obscure new-wave bands like the Danish electropop act Gangway, Bill Nelson, Japanese synthpop and shoegaze bands as influences.

Afar opens with "I Want You Now and Always", a track that Popmatters critic Brice Ezell described as a "resurrected Tears for Fears B-side". Consequence of Sound's Adam Kivel said the song's electronic bass tones "sound straight out of a high-fiving We're Having Fun Montage from any number of '80s films, and the cheap bell tones on the title track aren’t far behind." Evan Minsker of Pitchfork Media described "Teletrips" as a "slinky jam" with an influence that is from somewhere between Spandau Ballet and the song "Human Nature" by Michael Jackson. Tiny Mix Tapes critic Guy Frowny noted "The Ice Choir" and "Two Rings" as two "odd moment[s] when the beats are ramped up (though never to dancefloor proportions)".

== Singles ==
"Two Rings" and "The Ice Choir" were released as one single and Afar's lead single on November 15, 2011. Pitchfork Media premiered "Teletrips" on May 9, 2012, while "I Want You Now And Always" premiered on Stereogum on June 12.

== Critical reception ==
Professional ratings
Review scores
Source	Rating
AllMusic	3.5/5 stars
Consequence of Sound	D-
Pitchfork Media	7.3/10
PopMatters	5/10 stars
Spin	8/10
Tiny Mix Tapes	3/5 stars

Upon its release, Afar garnered mostly positive reviews from critics. In an eight-out-of-ten review published in the magazine Spin, Chris Martins opined that on the album, Kurt Feldman "gorgeously produces retro techno-pop with extra 3-D sheen, [John] Keats-inspired lyric gush." Both AllMusic's Tim Sendra and Pitchfork Media's Larry Fitzmaurice praised the use of 1980s influences such as OMD and Scritti Politti. The former opined that the songs "don't sound like '80 album tracks; they sound like hits", and concluded that Ice Choir, "could have easily played their love of '80s synthy pop as a joke, but they didn't and that makes the album a real treat for fans of the era." The latter gave it a 7.3 out of ten, saying that Feldman "nails [his reference points] spot-on with an impressive and loving faithfulness". Jon Carmanica said in his review for The New York Times, "Somewhat miraculously Mr. Feldman has blasted past the sting of the new and found his way back to the original feeling, untainted."

More mixed reviews of Afar were focused on its cheesiness. Brice Ezell, an assistant editor for PopMatters, described it as "the most pure take on '80s synth-pop that's been made since the decade concluded twenty-two years ago", but conclude that, "unless one is really keen to the music of the '80s in its most unadulterated form, Afar will be a dangerously cheesy experience." Consequence of Sound's Adam Kivel was especially critical of the corniness, writing that the record was highly clichéd and "lacks serious diversity", noting that the songs was difficult to differentiate from each other or other albums similar to Afar.

== Credits and personnel ==
Locations

- Recorded at Winter Station, Brooklyn, New York
- Mixed at Static Recording, Brooklyn New York

Personnel

- Kurt Feldman – songwriting, production, recording, vocals, programming, guitar, synthesizer
- Patrick South – synthesizer, fretless bass on "Teletrips", "Bounding" and "Everything Is Spoilt By Use", additional synthesizer on "The Ice Choir", co-production on "Everything Is Spoilt By Use"
- Raphael Radna – synthesizer
- Avery Brooks – percussion
- Jorge Elbrecht – mixing, additional programming on "Two Rings"
- Jaakko Viitalähde – mastering
- D.V. Caputo – artwork
- Alejandro Cardenas – Ice Choir logo

Equipment

- Yamaha DX7
- Yamaha TX816
- Akai AX60
- Ensoniq SQ1
- Minimoog
- Oberheim OB-8
- Yamaha VSS-200
- Fernandes FST
- Wal Pro Fretless Bass
