= Kurt Feldman =

American musician, composer, producer and multi-instrumentalist (born 1984)

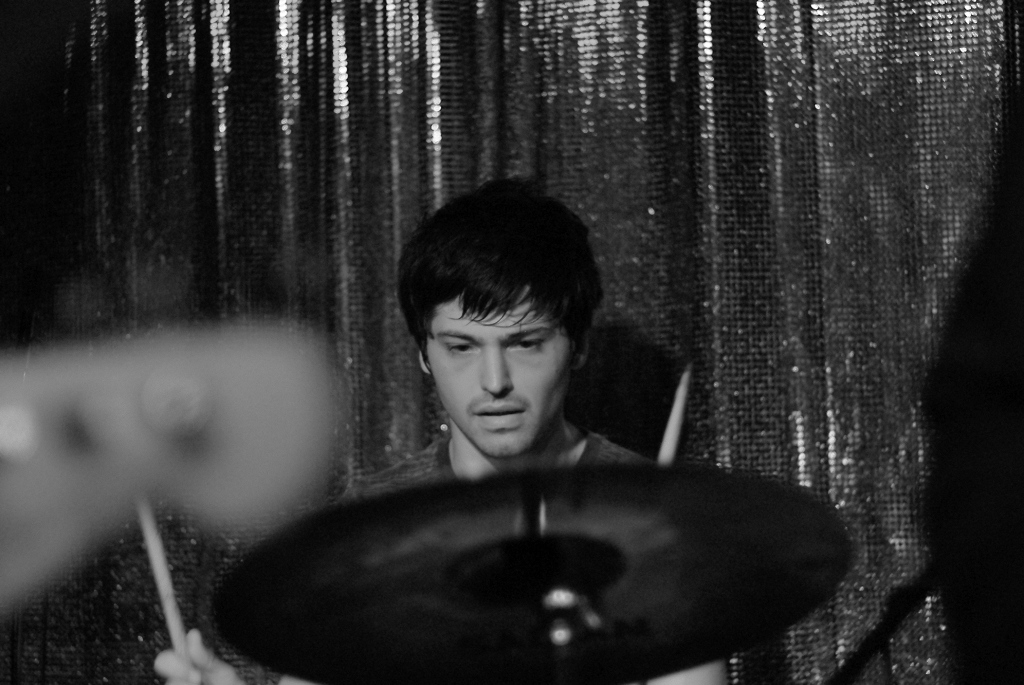
- Kurt Feldman performing in Berlin with The Pains of Being Pure at Heart in 2009

Background information
- Also known as: Ice Choir
- Born: Kurt Edward Feldman; January 29, 1984 (age 42); New York City, U.S.
- Genres: Synthpop; dreampop; shoegaze; video game music
- Occupations: Singer; musician; composer; producer
- Years active: 2005–present
- Member of: The Pains of Being Pure at Heart
- Formerly of: The Depreciation Guild
- Website: www.winter-station.com/ www.icechoir.com/

Kurt Edward Feldman (born January 29, 1984) is an American musician, composer, and multi-instrumentalist based in New York City, United States. He is best known as the former frontman for the Depreciation Guild and as a current member for Ice Choir, as well as for playing drums in the Pains of Being Pure at Heart.

== Early life ==
Feldman was born to a musician father and a teacher mother, both of whom influenced and encouraged his early musical development. His father worked at a record store during his youth, and his mother was an enthusiast of college radio and indie rock music, maintaining a collection of what he described as "cool indie" CDs. Some of his own first records included artists Dinosaur Jr and Nirvana. He has two younger brothers, Mike (bassist of Country Mice) and Dave (frontman of Wyldlife). He was raised primarily in the West Village and Westchester, New York.

He started playing guitar at around age 8 or 9 and in bands at age 11. He told Westword about his childhood, "I went to a music camp when I was eleven, and I became friends with a lot of kids who were older than me, like eighteen. There were a couple of summers where I would go to concerts with them, and they'd show me cool stuff and make me mixtapes." He was also one of the guest musicians for the Moldy Peaches' self-titled album. He played drums on the track "Little Bunny Foo Foo" which was recorded at his basement. At the time, he was already friends with the band's co-founder Adam Green.

In 2006, he finished his studies in childhood education at New York University. Despite his educational background and teaching experience in a music school, he was more interested in pursuing a musical career. He spoke to the Gothamist in 2009, stating that "[...]teaching has always been a fallback plan. I teach now at a music school, but I'd much rather be playing music professionally."

== Career ==
=== The Depreciation Guild ===
In 2003, Feldman started operating the DOS program NerdTracker II which allowed for the emulation of the Famicom (NES) 2A03 PSG 8-bit microprocessor for his music project, Approxim8. It was later evolved and heavily incorporated into the music he made with the Depreciation Guild. The band was formed in 2005. It was initially aimed as an outlet to express his musical hobby and interests in old video games, guitar pop, and electronic music. The band eventually took a more serious path, releasing their debut EP in 2006 and playing live shows. Feldman was aided by his high school friend Adrian Hashizume on guitar until 2007. Hashizume was then replaced by Feldman's college friend Christoph Hochheim. In 2008, Hochheim's identical twin brother Anton was added on drums. The three became the most well-known lineup of the band, and were joined by Feldman's former student Raphael Radna on bass and synthesizer in the summer of 2010. The band announced their dissolution in early 2011. They released two studio albums throughout their career: In Her Gentle Jaws (2007) and Spirit Youth (2010). Feldman has twice played reunion shows, with two different lineups: with Hashizume in 2013, and with the final lineup (the Hochheim twins and Radna) in 2023.

=== The Pains of Being Pure at Heart ===
Initially a trio, Feldman was recruited by roommate and the Pains of Being Pure at Heart's frontman Kip Berman as the fourth member in 2007. He served as the band's drummer until 2013, having contributed to their first three studio albums and toured extensively in North and South America, UK, Europe, Asia, Australia as well as New Zealand. In 2024, he rejoined the band alongside founding members Berman and Peggy Wang.

=== Ice Choir ===
Towards the end of the Depreciation Guild, Feldman began writing music without any of the NES programming of the band's previous works, and the other members also started losing interest and focus of the project. Considering that it was much more "guitar pop" than The Depreciation Guild, there were certain limitations and aspects in writing that Feldman did not want to go through, so he decided to try new things and start over with a new project. In the studio and live set up, Feldman is joined by Raphael Radna (former live member of the Depreciation Guild), Patrick South, and Avery Brooks (of Lost Children/formerly of Ravens & Chimes). As Ice Choir, Feldman has released three studio albums: Afar (2012), Designs in Rhythm (2016), and Gunsport (2020).

=== Roman à Clef ===
Feldman formed sophisti pop group Roman à clef with A Sunny Day in Glasgow members, Ryan Newmyer and Jen Goma. Feldman acted as producer for the group's debut album, Abandonware, which was released in 2015.

=== Producing, mixing, and composing ===
Since the Depreciation Guild's first release, Feldman has established his role as both composer and producer. Although he departed from the Pains of Being Pure at Heart in 2013, Feldman continued contributing to the band's studio releases which were credited on their albums, The Echo of Pleasure (2017) and Full Moon Fever (2018). He also actively teamed up with other artists such as Anamanaguchi, Chairlift, Kristin Kontrol, Samantha Urbani, and DIIV, helping for production, mixing, engineering and/or additional instrument needs.

Feldman is currently working as the sound design director at a sound branding agency Listen, as well as a video game composer. Under his real name, he has released several collections of VGM songs: Precise Works Ideal Selection, Vol. 001: TileWild (2010), Precise Works Ideal Selection, Vol. 002: StarLicker (2013), and Insert Credit (2021). His latest VGM works have been featured on games such as Slipstream (2024) and Demonschool (2025).

== Influences ==
Feldman has drawn inspiration from 1980s and early 90s music artists such as Scritti Politti, Talk Talk, Tears for Fears, Gangway, Cocteau Twins, Pale Saints, Orchestral Manoeuvres in the Dark and Prefab Sprout. The contrasting male/female vocals of Prefab Sprout were used as a reference on Ice Choir's "Everything Is Spoilt by Use" (from Afar, 2012). Feldman is also a fan of 80s J-pop artists such as Yellow Magic Orchestra.

== Discography ==
=== with The Depreciation Guild ===
Studio albums

- In Her Gentle Jaws (self-released, 2007; Kanine Records, 2009)
- Spirit Youth (Kanine Records, 2010)

Extended plays

- Nautilus EP (8bitpeoples, 2006)

=== with The Pains of Being Pure at Heart ===
Studio albums

- The Pains of Being Pure at Heart EP (Painbow, 2007)
- The Pains of Being Pure at Heart (Slumberland, 2009)
- Belong (Slumberland, 2011)
- Days of Abandon (Yebo Music, 2014)
- The Echo of Pleasure (Painbow, 2017)

EPs

- The Pains of Being Pure at Heart EP (Painbow, 2007)
- Higher Than the Stars (Slumberland, 2009)
- Acid Reflex (Play It Again Sam, 2012, Purple Vinyl)
- Abandonment Issue (Yebo Music, 2014)
- Hell (Painbow Records, 2015)

=== with Roman à Clef ===
Studio Albums

- Abandonware (2015)

=== as Kurt Feldman ===
Studio Albums

- Insert Credit (2021)
- Demonschool (Original Soundtrack) (2025)

EPs

- Precise Works Ideal Selection, Vol. 001: TileWild (2010)
- Precise Works Ideal Selection, Vol. 002: StarLicker (2013)
- Slipstream: Rogue Space (Original Soundtrack) (2024)

=== as Ice Choir ===
Studio Albums

- Afar (2012)
- Designs in Rhythm (2016)
- Gunsport (Original Soundtrack) (2020)

EPs

- Two Rings (2011)

Singles

- Pure Holiday (2014)
