= Escape Artists (disambiguation) =

Escape Artists is a motion picture and television production company

Escape Artists may also refer to:

- Escape Artists (Austrian band)
- Escape Artists (Danish band)
- Escape Artists, Inc., a podcast production company
- Escape Artists Motion Pictures, an Indian film production company in Tamil cinema

== See also ==
- Escape Artist (disambiguation)
- Escape artist, an entertainer specializing in escaping from restraints
