= Sitting in the Park =

Sitting in the Park may refer to:

- "Sitting in the Park" (song), a 1965 song by Billy Stewart and notably covered by Georgie Fame
- Sitting in the Park, a 1986 album by Gangway
