= Yamaha Tyros2 =

Music workstation

The Yamaha Tyros2 is a digital arranger workstation 61-key keyboard produced by Yamaha Corporation in 2005. It was produced and designed by Kazuhisa Ueki and Soichiro Tanaka, respectively. The Tyros2 introduced several new features to the Tyros series, such as 'SuperArticulation! Voices', allowing for more realistic sounding voices during performances, and hard-disk recording allowing users to export audio recordings. Many features seen in the original Tyros returned to the Tyros2, including MegaVoice, primarily used in MIDI recording, which use velocity switching to add realism; Live!, Sweet! and Cool! voices, that are sampled using stereo and multilayered samples to better capture the natural presence expression and vibrato of the real instruments; and Internet Direct Connection, allowing users to download content directly to the instrument.

== History ==
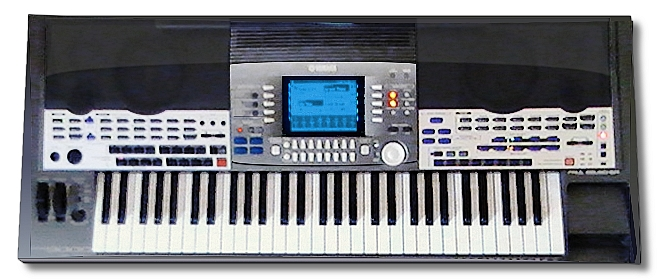
PSR9000 (1999)

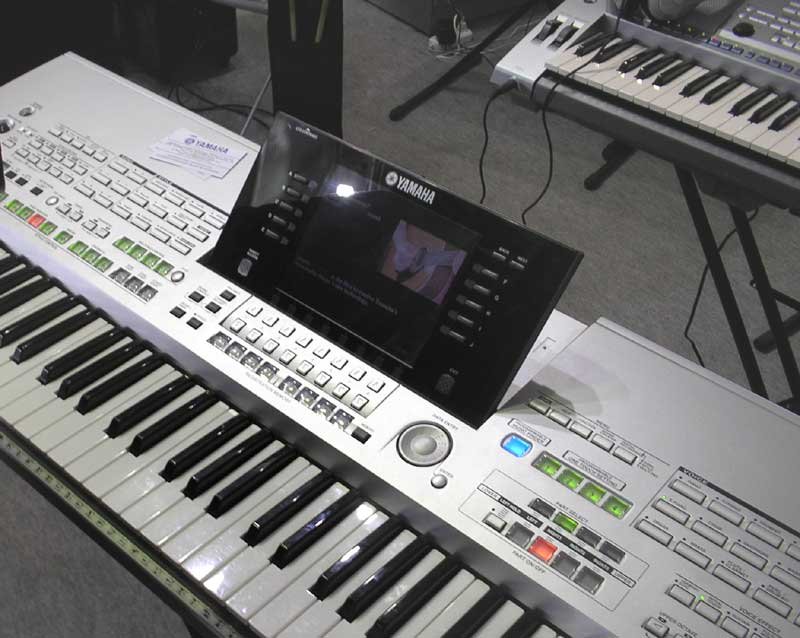
Tyros (2002)

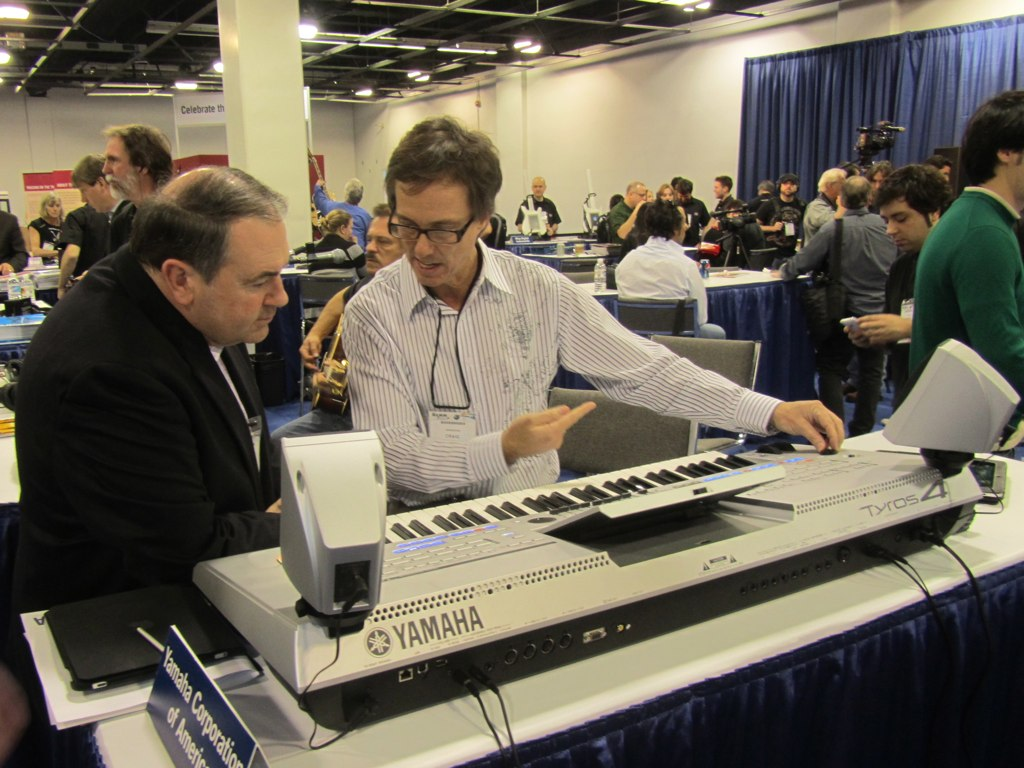
Tyros4 (2010) on NAMM Show

Kazuhisa Ueki and Soichiro Tanaka wanted to come up with an entirely new model of auto accompaniment keyboards for Yamaha. The long running PortaTone (PSR) series of instruments had evolved from simple hobbyist-orientated keyboards designed for home use in the 1980s to full function professional arranger workstations such as the flagship PSR-9000. But with the PSR series having its long association with home-orientated keyboards aimed squarely at the amateur, and with both Roland and Korg having established a reputation for professional arranger workstations of their own (Roland had produced the likes of the G-800, G-1000 and G-70; Korg the i3 and i30), Yamaha decided to split their offering into a separate brand.

The new series was thus given the name Tyros, which was the first of its kind in the market, that had features not found on the PSR. One common thing that the two makers did was that both Tyros and Tyros2 had no installed speakers, for their reason was mobility; they added a music rest and optional speakers that can be connected to the holes found on the back of the said keyboards. Ueki and Tanaka always describe Tyros and Tyros2 as "not a synthesizer, nor a keyboard; it is both."

To aid in accessibility of the Tyros and Tyros2, the buttons were lit up with an internal LED bulb and arranged in such a way it is easy to memorize, especially on studios and live performances. The LCD screen was also modified for easy reading and operation as possible.

Tyros2 had a "very polyhedral" design according to Tanaka, which was part of a plan of "chipping off" or "scrapping off" unnecessary parts of the body, but it was done which careful planning, for the internal parts and the peripherals must be fitted in the limited space. Both makers said that the "chipping off" plan was inspired by "crystallization", which was commonly used to refer to everyone involved in the development of the Tyros2. To adopt Tyros2 as a "crystal", Ueki and Tanaka used the properties of a crystal; being light, lustrous, shiny and solid. For this to be integrated to the Tyros2, they used plastic as its body, for reduction of weight, silver as its color, to detail the "shine" of Tyros2, and the lighted buttons, for the "luster". Ueki and Tanaka said on an interview that they even used black as the color of Tyros2, after they remembered the color of granite.

But much of the revolution of the "crystallization" of Tyros to Tyros2 was on the preloaded voices, styles and songs. Inspired by the installed voices on Tyros, Ueki remarked that "keeping the Voices of Tyros, and balancing it with the higher quality voices for the instrument, was nerve-wracking."
