= Days of Abandon =

Studio album by the Pains of Being Pure at Heart
- Released: May 13, 2014
- Recorded: August 2013
- Studios: House Under Magic (Brooklyn, New York)
- Genre: Indie pop
- Length: 36:58
- Label: Yebo
- Producer: Andy Savours

The Pains of Being Pure at Heart chronology
Belong (2011)	Days of Abandon (2014)	Hell (2015)

Singles from Days of Abandon
- 1. "Simple and Sure" Released: April 7, 2014

Days of Abandon is the third studio album by American indie pop band the Pains of Being Pure at Heart. It was released on May 13, 2014 by Yebo Music. The album was issued in Europe by Fierce Panda Records on June 2, 2014.

== Critical reception ==
Professional ratings
Aggregate scores
Source	Rating
AnyDecentMusic?	6.6/10
Metacritic	69/100
Review scores
Source	Rating
AllMusic	3/5 stars
The A.V. Club	C
Consequence	B−
The Guardian	3/5 stars
The Irish Times	4/5 stars
Mojo	3/5 stars
NME	8/10
Pitchfork	7.5/10
Spin	7/10
Under the Radar	8/10

Under the Radar reviewer Austin Trunick found Days of Abandon to be reminiscent of "jangle-centric" 1980s music, "somewhere between The Smiths and The Cure's bouncier hits." Sasha Geffen of Consequence of Sound wrote that the album was "more deliberately articulated" than previous releases by The Pains of Being Pure at Heart, comparing its musical style to those of The New Pornographers and Interpol. In a joint review by 10 Sonic Seducer writers, the album was compared to the music of The Cure, The Smiths, and New Order, while also being criticized for being too shallow.

== Track listing ==
No.	Title	Writer(s)	Length
1.	"Art Smock"	Kip Berman	2:16
2.	"Simple and Sure"	Berman; Kurt Feldman	3:28
3.	"Kelly"	Berman; Feldman; Kelly Pratt	3:03
4.	"Beautiful You"	Berman; Feldman	6:10
5.	"Coral and Gold"	Berman; Feldman	3:39
6.	"Eurydice"	Berman; Feldman	4:18
7.	"Masokissed"	Berman; Feldman	3:23
8.	"Until the Sun Explodes"	Berman; Feldman	2:26
9.	"Life After Life"	Berman; Feldman; Pratt	4:01
10.	"The Asp at My Chest"	Berman; Feldman; Pratt	4:14
Total length:			36:58

Japanese edition bonus tracks
No.	Title	Writer(s)	Length
11.	"Impossible"	Berman; Feldman; Pratt	4:04
12.	"Summer of Dreams"	Berman; Feldman; Pratt	3:29
13.	"The Real World"	Berman; Feldman; Pratt	4:41
Total length:			49:12

Deluxe edition bonus tracks
No.	Title	Writer(s)	Length
11.	"Impossible"	Berman; Feldman; Pratt	4:04
12.	"Summer of Dreams"	Berman; Feldman; Pratt	3:29
13.	"The Real World"	Berman; Feldman; Pratt	4:41
14.	"Poison Touch"	Berman; Feldman	3:48
15.	"Kelly" (Winter Station demo)	Berman; Feldman; Pratt	2:53
Total length:			55:53

== Personnel ==
Credits are adapted from the album's liner notes.

The Pains of Being Pure at Heart

- Kip Berman – guitar, lead vocals
- Kurt Feldman – drums, percussion, synthesizer, programming, backing vocals
- Alex Naidus – bass

Additional musicians

- Jen Goma – lead vocals on "Kelly" and "Life After Life", backing vocals
- Kelly Pratt – horns
- Andy Savours – programming, additional synthesizer

Production

- Charlie Hugall – mixing
- Joe LaPorta – mastering
- Joe Rodgers – assistance (mixing)
- Andy Savours – production
- Danny Taylor – assistance (production)

== Charts ==
Chart (2014)	Peak position
Japanese Albums (Oricon)	63
Japanese Top Albums Sales (Billboard Japan)	59
Japanese Top Independent Albums and Singles (Billboard Japan)	25
UK Albums (Official Charts)	179
UK Independent Albums (Official Charts)	33
US Billboard 200	168
US Independent Albums (Billboard)	32
US Top Rock Albums (Billboard)	49
