= Hell (EP) =

EP by the Pains of Being Pure at Heart
- Released: November 13, 2015
- Genre: Indie pop
- Label: Painbow

The Pains of Being Pure at Heart chronology
Days of Abandon (2014)	Hell (2015)	The Echo of Pleasure (2017)

Professional ratings
Review scores
Source	Rating
Pitchfork	5.5/10
Under the Radar	5.5

Hell is EP by American indie pop band the Pains of Being Pure at Heart, released on November 13, 2015, via their own label, Painbow Records.

== Track listing ==
1. "Hell" – 3:52
2. "Ballad of the Band" (Felt cover) – 2:50
3. "Laid" (James cover) – 2:50
