= The Pains of Being Pure at Heart (album) =

Studio album by the Pains of Being Pure at Heart
- Released: February 3, 2009
- Recorded: 2008
- Studios: Honeyland (Brooklyn, New York)
- Genres: Indie pop; dream pop; noise pop
- Length: 34:58
- Label: Slumberland

The Pains of Being Pure at Heart chronology
The Pains of Being Pure at Heart (2007)	The Pains of Being Pure at Heart (2009)	Higher Than the Stars (2009)

Singles from The Pains of Being Pure at Heart
- 1. "Everything with You" Released: October 14, 2008; 2. "Young Adult Friction" Released: March 31, 2009; 3. "Come Saturday" Released: September 8, 2009

The Pains of Being Pure at Heart is the debut studio album by American indie pop band the Pains of Being Pure at Heart. It was released on February 3, 2009, by Slumberland Records. The band recorded the album at Honeyland Studios in Brooklyn. The Pains of Being Pure at Heart was released to generally warm critical reception.

== Music ==
The album's sound has been compared to My Bloody Valentine, Ride, The Field Mice, and The Jesus and Mary Chain. Pitchfork assessed the album's musical style as "exist[ing] in the swirling intersection" between indie pop and dream pop: "You could say it never drifts off to Slumberland, pun intended—it’s determined to dream. More My Bloody Valentine circa “Sunny Sundae Smile” than Loveless, the Brooklyn band mixes a toffee and Vicodin cocktail topped off with a heavy dollop of power chords, fuzz pedals, and watercolor-psychedelia. [...] Kip Berman swoons with Edwyn Collins’ passion while Peggy Wang’s synths and backing vocals float through the reverb. It’s a romantic, youthful nostalgia that Berman once described as 'sort of a John Hughes, magical feeling,' where the library is a hot hookup spot and every dweeb in an anorak can take on the world."

== Artwork and title ==
The album's cover artwork features a shot of two teenagers in black and white effect. According to Berman, the teenagers are from Arizona, one of them being the photographer herself named Kendra Rutledge. Her work is also featured as the cover artwork of the band's Higher Than the Stars EP. As for the title, it was originally intended to be called "Romantic Friendship". Berman thought that "a lot of our songs were kinda about that idea: the way you have intense relationships when you’re growing up that aren't necessarily romantic, but also aren't necessarily not. I always think that [the album artwork] suggests that [idea]." Eventually, they settled on the band's own name as the title, as "it would have been way too ridiculous" for the band to use such a name, although Berman admitted he still liked it in a 2025 interview.

== Release and promotion ==
The Pains of Being Pure at Heart was released in the United States on February 3, 2009, by Slumberland Records. In other territories, the album was released by different labels, including Fortuna Pop! in Europe, Lost & Lonesome Recording Co. in Australia, and Fastcut Records in Japan.

Three singles were released from The Pains of Being Pure at Heart: "Everything with You" on October 14, 2008, "Young Adult Friction" on March 31, 2009, and "Come Saturday" on September 8, 2009.

== Critical reception ==
Professional ratings
Aggregate scores
Source	Rating
AnyDecentMusic?	7.5/10
Metacritic	76/100
Review scores
Source	Rating
AllMusic	3.5/5 stars
The A.V. Club	A−
Blender	3.5/5 stars
The Guardian	3/5 stars
The Irish Times	4/5 stars
MSN Music (Consumer Guide)	A−
NME	8/10
Pitchfork	8.4/10
Rolling Stone	3.5/5 stars
Uncut	3/5 stars

The Pains of Being Pure at Heart received generally positive reviews. On the review aggregation website Metacritic, the album holds a score of 76 out of 100, indicating "generally favorable reviews". NME's Nathaniel Cramp praised it as "pure indie-pop to hold close to your heart." Pitchfork accorded the album a "Best New Music" designation, with reviewer Ian Cohen writing that the band had "made a slyly confident debut that mixes sparkling melodies with an undercurrent of sad bastard mopery". David Bevan of The A.V. Club called the band "sensitive and sublime", while Robert Christgau of MSN Music said of them: "Not only do they have a sound, they have tunes, and the words bring both home."

AllMusic critic Tim Sendra was more reserved in his praise, finding that the album would have benefited from "a little more variation from song to song, a little more of [the band's] own sound, or another song or two as compelling as the best stuff here", while concluding: "Settling for impressive is fair enough and good enough for fans of loud, fuzzy, and heartfelt indie noise pop." Maddy Costa of The Guardian concluded that "anyone convinced that the C86 bands represent a nadir of tweeness will hate it – while anyone who thinks that Britpop and dance music ruined indie will fall hopelessly in love." PopMatters' Matthew Fiander found the band overly derivative and felt that on the second half of the album, "the melodies sound a little too simple, the vocals almost anemic, and the songs take on a dreary-afternoon trudge."

Pitchfork ranked The Pains of Being Pure at Heart at number 19 on its list of the best albums of 2009, while "Young Adult Friction" placed at number 30 on the website's list of the best tracks of the year. In 2018, Pitchfork listed The Pains of Being Pure at Heart as the 28th best dream pop album.

== Track listing ==
All tracks are written by The Pains of Being Pure at Heart (Kip Berman, Kurt Feldman, Alex Naidus, and Peggy Wang).

No.	Title	Length
1.	"Contender"	2:40
2.	"Come Saturday"	3:17
3.	"Young Adult Friction"	4:07
4.	"This Love Is Fucking Right!"	3:15
5.	"The Tenure Itch"	3:45
6.	"Stay Alive"	4:56
7.	"Everything with You"	2:59
8.	"A Teenager in Love"	3:24
9.	"Hey Paul"	2:03
10.	"Gentle Sons"	4:32
Total length:		34:58

Japanese edition bonus tracks
No.	Title	Length
11.	"Gothenburg Handshake" (demo)	1:33
12.	"I Wanna Go All the Way" (demo)	2:28
Total length:		38:59

== Personnel ==
Credits are adapted from the album's liner notes.

The Pains of Being Pure at Heart

- Kip Berman – guitar, vocals
- Kurt Feldman – drums
- Alex Naidus – bass
- Peggy Wang – keyboards, vocals

Production

- Jon Chaikin – mastering
- Archie Moore – engineering, mixing

Design

- Pavla Kopecna – inside photography (CD edition), back cover photography (LP edition)
- Kendra Rutledge – front cover photography

== Charts ==
Chart (2009)	Peak position
Japanese Top Independent Albums and Singles (Billboard Japan)	81
UK Independent Albums (Official Charts)	43
US Heatseekers Albums (Billboard)	9
US Independent Albums (Billboard)	37
