= Escape Artist (disambiguation) =

An escape artist is an expert on escapology, the practice of escaping from restraints or other traps.

Escape Artist may also refer to:

- Escape Artist Records, an independent record label formed in 1997
- The Escape Artist (film), a 1982 American film
- The Escape Artist (TV series), a 2013 BBC thriller series
- Escape Artist (Garland Jeffreys album) (1981)
- Escape Artist (Our Lady Peace album) or Burn Burn (2009)
- "The Escape Artist" (Star Trek: Short Treks), an episode of Star Trek: Short Treks
- The Escape Artist, a 1997 novel by Judith Katz
- The Escape Artist, a 2018 novel by Brad Meltzer
- The Escape Artist: The Man Who Broke Out of Auschwitz to Warn the World, a 2022 book by Jonathan Freedland

== See also ==
- Escape Artists (disambiguation)
- The Great Escape Artist, 2011 album by Jane's Addiction
