= Escape Artists (Danish band) =

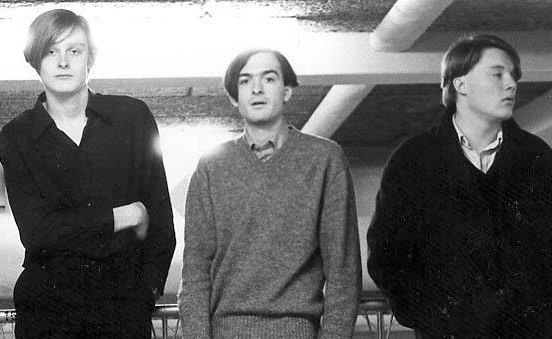
- L-R: Søren Laugesen, Torben Johansen, Benny Woitowitz

Background information
- Origin: Haderslev, Denmark
- Genres: Alternative rock, new wave, post-punk
- Years active: 1981–1984, 2006–present
- Labels: TuneCore, Replik Muzick
- Members: Torben Johansen; Søren Laugesen; Benny Woitowitz
- Website: http://www.escapeartists.dk

Escape Artists is a post-punk band from Copenhagen, Denmark, formed 1981 in Haderslev, Sønderjylland. They have played several gigs with notable Danish punk/post-punk bands Sods and Kliche. The band split in 1984, but reformed in 2006.

After regrouping in 2006 with the original lineup, the band released a self-financed vinyl, Ashes & Debris EP, in 2011.

== History ==
=== Early years (1981–1984) ===
Escape Artists was formed in the autumn of 1981 by Torben Johansen (guitar and vocals) (later of Gangway), Søren Laugesen (bass and vocals) and Benny Woitowitz (drums) in Haderslev, Sonderjutland, Denmark. Their main influences back then were Joy Division, Siouxsie and the Banshees and The Cure.

Escape Artists were soon very active on the Danish underground scene, playing several gigs with notable Danish punk bands Sods and Kliche.

In early 1983, Escape Artists appeared on the compilation album Somewhere Outside, highlighting bands from outside the media focused Copenhagen post-punk scene. The album was released by the Copenhagen label Irmgardz and featured 3 tracks by Escape Artists: "The Pain", "The Voice" and "The Loneliness".

In the summer of 1983, Escape Artists recorded material for the planned album Brittle China in the assembly hall of the local high school, Haderslev Katedralskole, with the help from local sound wizard Jan Michael Jensen and his 4-track tape machine. The result was deemed unsatisfactory and was shelved. Several of the tracks were later released on the tape Baby Burn This World (1984) and the digital download and CD-on-demand Brittle China (Shards EP) in 2011.

In late 1983, Escape Artists booked the Arp Studio in Århus and recorded 2 tracks, "The Howl" and "My World". These 2 songs were released in May 1984 as the 7" single "The Howl" on the Danish label Replik Muzick.

In 1984, Escape Artists went on permanent hiatus.

=== Reformation (2006–present) ===
In 2006, Escape Artists slowly began to meet up again in the original line-up in varying rehearsal spaces in Copenhagen.

In early 2010, a permanent base for rehearsals was secured and new material quickly materialised. In summer 2010 the tracks included on the EP Ashes & Debris were recorded. This EP was released on the band's own label in December 2010 on 10" vinyl, download and CD-on-demand.

The band played their first gig in 27 years on 24 September at the Rust venue in Copenhagen. The old recordings of the unreleased album Brittle China surfaced, and were remastered; 6 of the songs appear as the EP Brittle China (Shards EP) released in November 2011.

Escape Artists planned the recording of material for an album in summer 2012.

== Discography ==
- Somewhere Outside (2xLP) Irmgardz 1983 - IRMG08
- Brittle China (LP) Replik Muzick 1983 - Rep8 (unreleased)
- The Howl/My World (7") Replick Muzick 1984 - Rep13
- Baby Burn This World (MC) Replick Muzick 1984 - Rep17
- Ashes & Debris EP (10") Escape Artists 2010 - ESC001
- Brittle China (Shards EP) (Download) Escape Artists 2011 - ESC002
- Iron Curtian Effigies EP Escape Artists 2016
