= Designs in Rhythm =

Studio album by Ice Choir
- Released: September 6, 2016
- Genre: Synthpop
- Length: 32:13
- Labels: Shelflife; Fastcut
- Producer: Kurt Feldman

Ice Choir chronology
Afar (2012)	Designs in Rhythm (2016)

Singles from Designs in Rhythm
- 1. "Unprepared" Released: June 28, 2016

Designs in Rhythm is the second studio album of Ice Choir, a synthpop project led by American producer Kurt Feldman. The record borrows the sound from the group's previous effort Afar (2012) and adds an accessible and modern element to it. The press release from Shelflife Records categorized the album's tracks as "shimmering, infectious, maximalist pop gems" with "lush production and irresistible melodies." Promoted with a single, "Unprepared," two music videos, "Designs in Rhythm" and "Amorous In Your Absence," and a Japanese tour, Designs in Rhythm was released in September 2016 by the labels Shelflife and Fastcut Records to positive reviews from professional critics.

== Composition ==
The press release by Shelflife Records categorized the songs on Designs in Rhythm as "shimmering, infectious, maximalist pop gems" with "lush production and irresistible melodies." The LP is a 1980s-esque pop record featuring elements of the works of Tears for Fears, the soundtrack for the arcade game Out Run (1986), J-pop, and R&B. In the words of Collin Robinson of Stereogum, the album features "gauzy" vocal performances and an "adventurous layering and texturing of synths that pulls you into a dream-like aesthetic and snaps you out of it artfully with intricate musicality." Robinson also wrote that the tracks have changing rhythmic structures where "some [songs] will have you grooving along and others will have you flat out dancing." Lyrically, all of the songs have vague concepts left up to listen interpretation.

Designs In Rhythm's production style is a more accessible and mainstream version of that on Ice Choir's previous album Afar (2012), which consists of what Allmusic writer Tim Sendra described as "achingly pretty vocals, lots of very sophisticated melodies, pleasingly factory-fresh synths" and "cheesily processed guitars." This modernization is most evident on the songs “Noosphering” and the Carly Rae Jepsen-esque cut “Amorous in Your Absence,” which features vocals from A Sunny Day in Glasgow's Jen Goma. Sendra described the production as "note-perfect" and "nary-a-wrong-move," writing that the album "sounds like an OMD or ABC or Scritti Politti album with all the fluff stripped away and only the bright and shiny parts left."

== Release and promotion ==
On June 28, 2016, Stereogum premiered "Unprepared" as the lead single of Designs in Rhythm. The track garnered favorable reviews upon its release. BrooklynVegan called it a "listening shard of romo pop, jam-packed with great little details, that could’ve soundtracked a dozen Reagan-era movie montages." In writing for Pitchfork, Cameron Cook said, "far from stuck in the past, Ice Choir deliver a nostalgic fantasy almost on par with [the original 1980s decade]." On September 6, 2016, Stereogum premiered Designs in Rhythm for worldwide streaming. Fastcut Records released the CD and vinyl version of the album in Japan on September 7. On September 9, Shelflife Records released the LP on vinyl in the United States and on digital stores worldwide. From December 3 to December 7, 2016, a tour took place in the Japanese cities of Kobe, Tokyo, Hiroshima, and Hamamatsu promoting Designs In Rhythm.

On December 19, 2016, Stereogum premiered the official music video for the title track, which was directed by D.V. Caputo who also created the cover art for Designs in Rhythm. The video involves the band members in CGI landscapes, described by writer Chris DeVille as "an instructional film crossed with a video game." On February 21, 2017, the video for "Amorous in Your Absence," directed by Ethan Young, premiered via The Fader. It depicts Feldman and Goma who are stuck in a series of "nightmare" Pierre et Gilles-style advertisement photo shoots.

== Reception ==
Professional ratings
Review scores
Source	Rating
Allmusic	3.5/5 stars
No Ripcord	7/10 stars

In a review for radio station KEXP-FM's blog, Gerrit Feenstra called Designs in Rhythm one of the best pop releases of 2016, describing it as a "vibrant" and "delightful pop album, rich in 80s heritage without ever alienating fans without love for time travel." He analyzed that the album was more accessible than the past works of the Ice Choir not due to a decrease of quality of the content, but rather from a change in sonic structure: "Feldman sounds less like he is trying to tribute a single snapshot and more like he’s making smart 2016 pop with a selective sound palette." Another highlight in his review was the record's "shimmering sonic architecture that will win you over with equally saturated charm and technique."

Sendra, in his review for Allmusic, labeled Designs in Rhythm an "impressive and fun" recreation of "the cheesiest, most disposable synth pop" of the 1980s, honoring it as "essential listening for '80s lovers while still sounding modern enough to steer clear of bland pastiche territory." The flawless production of the album served as the primary praise and criticism in his review, writing, "There are no failed experiments, no corny crossover attempts, and no sappy ballads, which means it's a pretty streamlined listen. The flip side of that is a lack of songs that truly stand out." A No Ripcord critic described it "imitation with heart," writing that the "genuine awareness and awe" is what made the group's replication of 1980s synthpop sounds so charming. He spotlighted the first half of the LP as a "rich demonstration of the band’s careful ear for what makes those 80s hits so timeless," while being more mixed on the second half for being "a distinctly calmer affair."

== Track listing ==
All tracks written and produced by Kurt Feldman. Track lengths from the iTunes Store.

No.	Title	Length
1.	"Let’s Music"	0:52
2.	"Unprepared"	4:07
3.	"Designs In Rhythm"	3:49
4.	"Windsurf"	3:16
5.	"Variant"	3:39
6.	"Spectacle"	1:23
7.	"Noosphering"	4:14
8.	"Amorous In Your Absence"	3:26
9.	"Comfortable"	3:58
10.	"The Garden of Verse"	3:29
Total length:		32:13

== Release history ==
Region	Date	Format(s)	Label
Worldwide	September 6, 2016	Audio streaming	Stereogum
Japan	September 7, 2016	CD; Vinyl	Fastcut
Worldwide	September 9, 2016	Digital download	Shelflife
United States	September 9, 2016	Vinyl	Shelflife
