= Belong (The Pains of Being Pure at Heart album) =

Studio album by the Pains of Being Pure at Heart
- Released: March 29, 2011
- Recorded: 2010
- Studios: Stratosphere Sound, New York City; Assault & Battery 2, London
- Genres: Indie pop; dream pop; alternative rock
- Length: 39:20
- Label: Slumberland
- Producers: Flood; James Brown

The Pains of Being Pure at Heart chronology
Higher Than the Stars (2009)	Belong (2011)	Days of Abandon (2014)

Singles from Belong
- 1. "Heart in Your Heartbreak" Released: December 14, 2010; 2. "Belong" Released: March 7, 2011; 3. "The Body" Released: July 25, 2011

Belong is the second studio album by American indie pop band the Pains of Being Pure at Heart. It was released on March 29, 2011, by Slumberland Records. The album was chiefly produced by Flood. The band recorded Belong at the Manhattan studio Stratosphere Sound and Flood's London studio Assault & Battery 2 throughout the summer of 2010, in between touring stints.

== Background ==
In an interview with Pitchfork, vocalist and guitarist Kip Berman explained that the band "wanted the songs to exist in an immediate and instinctual place." He continued:

The album sounds like we're taking away what we were hiding behind before. Lyrically, the first record had a lot of remembered experiences that I was looking back on and trying to make more clever, which can sound contrived. I like the idea of lyrics that don't get beyond themselves but catch you and make an impression. I think that's more emotionally compelling.

The album was influenced by music from artists including the Smashing Pumpkins, OMD, Ash, the House of Love, and the Associates.

== Release ==
In February 2011, The Pains of Being Pure at Heart announced that the album would be titled Belong. On March 10, 2011, the full album was made available to stream on the band's website. Belong was officially released on March 29, 2011, by Slumberland Records. In the United Kingdom, it was released by the Fortuna Pop! label. Prior to its release, two singles were issued from the album: "Heart in Your Heartbreak" on December 14, 2010, and "Belong" on March 7, 2011. A third single, "The Body", was released on July 25, 2011.

The Pains of Being Pure at Heart performed "Heart in Your Heartbreak" on the March 23, 2011 episode of Late Show with David Letterman. In April and May 2011, the band embarked on a tour of the United States in promotion of Belong, on which they were supported by the musician Twin Shadow. Throughout the rest of the year, they toured Europe and the United States. In 2012, the band performed in Australia, New Zealand, and Singapore for the St Jerome's Laneway Festival, and toured Asia.

On April 21, 2012, the band released Acid Reflex, a four-track EP consisting of remixes of songs from Belong, for Record Store Day.

== Critical reception ==
Professional ratings
Aggregate scores
Source	Rating
AnyDecentMusic?	7.0/10
Metacritic	76/100
Review scores
Source	Rating
AllMusic	3.5/5 stars
Alternative Press	4.5/5 stars
The A.V. Club	B+
Entertainment Weekly	B+
The Guardian	3/5 stars
Mojo	4/5 stars
NME	3/10
Pitchfork	8.2/10
Rolling Stone	3.5/5 stars
Spin	8/10

Belong was received positively by music critics. It earned a score of 76 out of 100, indicating "generally favorable reviews", on the review aggregation website Metacritic.

== Track listing ==
All tracks are written by Kip Berman, Kurt Feldman, Alex Naidus, and Peggy Wang.

No.	Title	Length
1.	"Belong"	4:21
2.	"Heaven's Gonna Happen Now"	3:54
3.	"Heart in Your Heartbreak"	3:45
4.	"The Body"	3:54
5.	"Anne with an E"	4:08
6.	"Even in Dreams"	4:24
7.	"My Terrible Friend"	3:11
8.	"Girl of 1,000 Dreams"	2:49
9.	"Too Tough"	4:32
10.	"Strange"	4:22
Total length:		39:20

Japanese edition bonus tracks
No.	Title	Length
11.	"The One"	4:04
12.	"I Wanna Go All the Way"	2:42
13.	"Steel Daughter"	3:37
14.	"Tomorrow Dies Today"	3:59
Total length:		53:42

== Personnel ==
Credits are adapted from the album's liner notes.

The Pains of Being Pure at Heart

- Kip Berman – guitar, vocals
- Kurt Feldman – drums, percussion
- Christoph Hochheim – guitar
- Alex Naidus – bass, backing vocals
- Peggy Wang – keyboards, vocals

Production

- James Brown – engineering, production on "Too Tough"
- John Catlin – assistance (mixing)
- Flood – production, recording
- Joe LaPorta – mastering
- Darren Lawson – engineering
- Emily Lazar – mastering
- Catherine Marks – engineering (mixing)
- Atsuo Matsumoto – assistance (New York recording sessions)
- Alan Moulder – mixing
- Drew Smith – assistance (London recording sessions)
- Adam Tilzer – assistance (New York recording sessions)

Design

- Winston Chmielinski – front cover artwork
- Pavla Kopecna – photography
- Michael Schulman – layout

== Charts ==
Chart (2011)	Peak position
Belgian Albums (Ultratop Flanders)	69
Belgian Alternative Albums (Ultratop Flanders)	28
French Albums (SNEP)	167
Japanese Albums (Oricon)	76
Japanese Top Albums Sales (Billboard Japan)	63
Spanish Albums (Promusicae)	80
UK Albums (Official Charts)	109
UK Independent Albums (Official Charts)	15
US Billboard 200	92
US Heatseekers Albums (Billboard)	41
US Independent Albums (Billboard)	18
US Top Alternative Albums (Billboard)	18
US Top Rock Albums (Billboard)	27
