= Korg i3 =

Music workstation

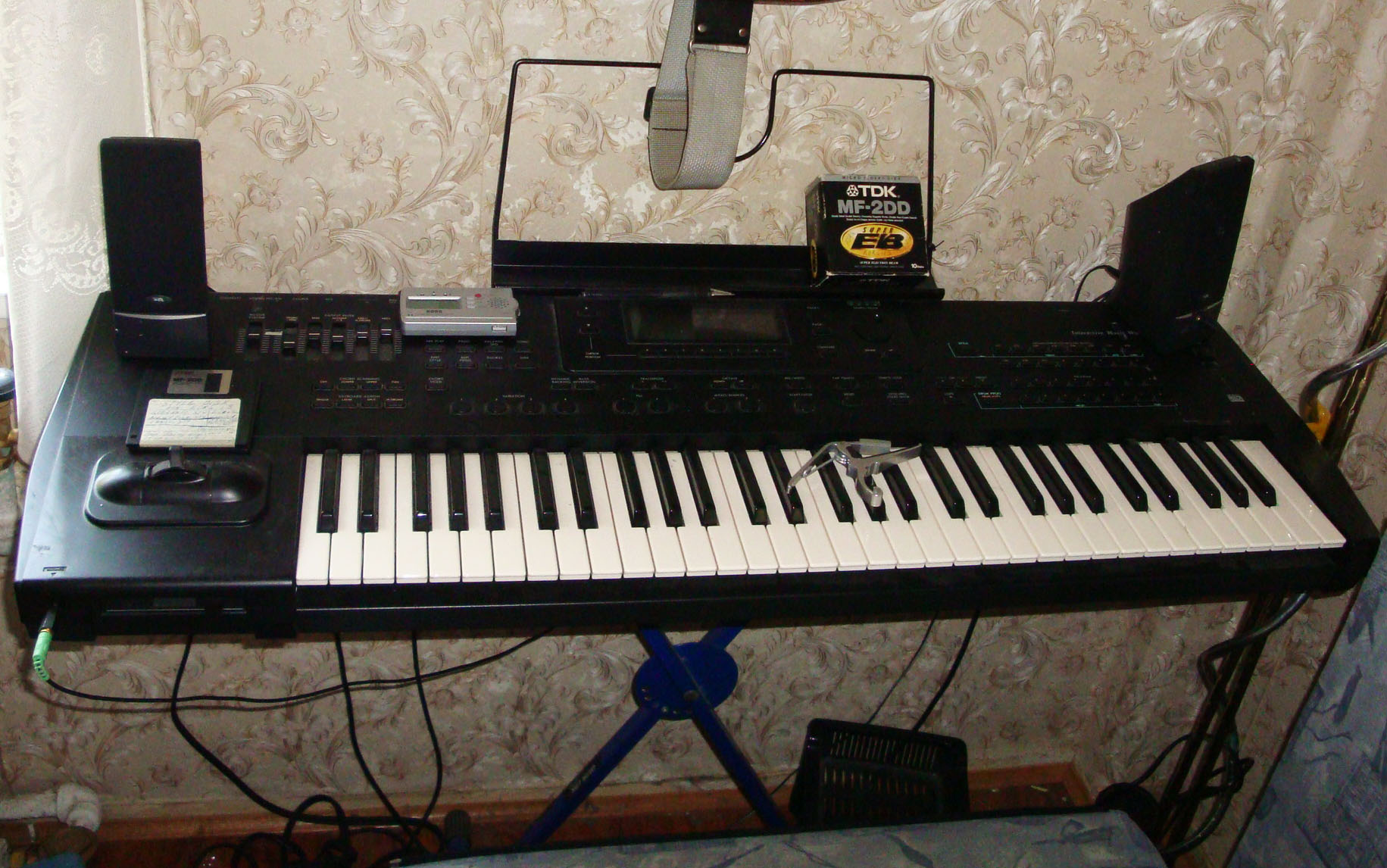
Korg i3 synthesizer

The Korg i3 is a keyboard instrument introduced by Korg in 1993. Known as an "Interactive Music Workstation", the i3 broke new ground for Korg, and defined a new type of instrument - the professional auto-accompaniment workstation. Contrary to popular belief, it was not Korg's first foray into the realm of auto-accompaniment - it had a minor hit in 1985 with the SAS-20, a home keyboard with built-in speakers.

Previously, the auto-accompaniment concept was not taken seriously by professional users, who saw it more the preserve of home hobbyists, and the market had been dominated by low-cost machines made by the likes of Casio and Yamaha with their respective Casiotone and PortaSound range of instruments. Roland's E-Series line had made inroads into improving the reputation of auto-accompaniment, but there was still some way to go.

Retailing for $2500, the i3 used a 32-voice tone generation system derived from the X3, using the company's familiar AI2 synthesis system. All 340 tones were user-editable (max. 64 user voices could be saved in backed RAM + 2 user drum sets) and sampled at 32 kHz. The auto-accompaniment section consisted of 48 in-built styles, each consisting of 4 variations, 2 fill-ins, and 2 intros/endings. There were a further 4 "blank" spaces for user styles to be loaded into non-volatile RAM via a 3.5" DD floppy disk and 4 from a memory card. There were also two sequencers; a conventional 16-track General MIDI compatible system for the editing and playback of SMF data, whilst there was also a "Backing Sequencer" - effectively a simple recorder for recording of performances using the auto-accompaniment system, but had the ability to add a further 10 tracks over this. The most obvious sign to the user that the i3 was a departure from the usual auto-accompaniment keyboard format was the lack of built in speakers.

Early reviews of the i3 were favourable, and the company released a 76-note version (the i2) shortly afterward, whilst a version equipped with speakers, the i4S debuted in 1994. A further cut down version (the i5S) followed in 1996.

The auto-accompaniment workstation concept was quickly imitated by other manufacturers, most notably Roland's G-800, launched in 1995. Korg replaced the i3 in 1998 with the i30, and its speakered siblings the iS40 and iS50. Yamaha were also forced to respond with more advanced versions of its long running PSR (PortaTone) series, culminating in its Tyros and Genos workstations.

At NAMM 2020, Korg announced the release of a new i3, nearly 30 years after the original.
