= Kliche =

Kliche is a German language surname. It stems from the male given name Clemens – and may refer to:

- Fernando Kliche (1954), Uruguayan-born Chilean actor
- Ulf Kliche (1969), German former professional footballer
- Uwe Kliche (1938), German weightlifter
