= The Depreciation Guild =

American dream pop and shoegaze band

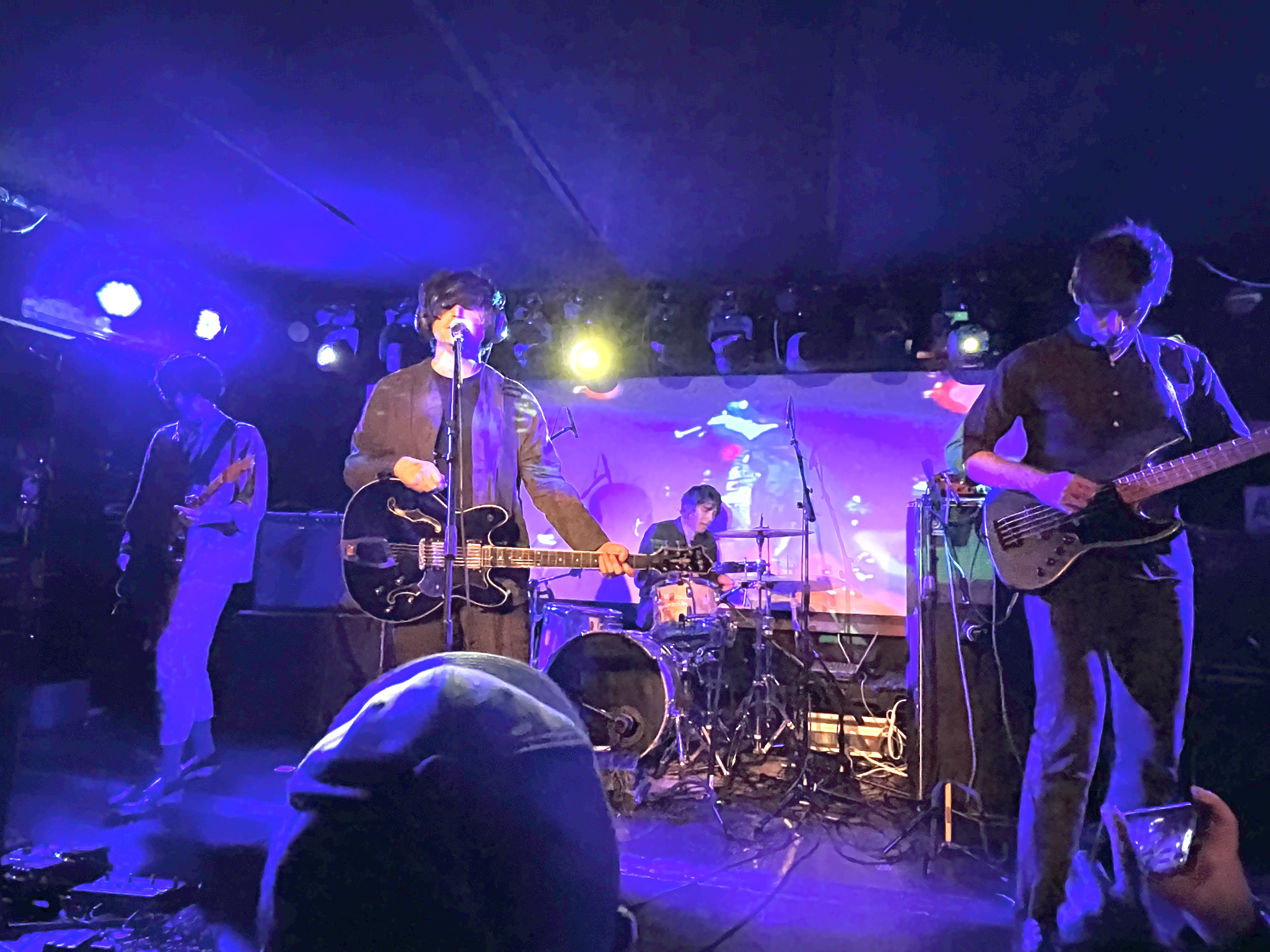
- The Depreciation Guild performing live in New York City

Background information
- Origin: Brooklyn, New York, U.S.
- Genres: Dream pop; shoegaze; Nintendocore
- Years active: 2005–2011 (Reunions: 2013, 2023)
- Labels: 8bitpeoples Kanine Records
- Spinoffs: The Pains of Being Pure at Heart; Ice Choir; Ablebody; Roman à Clef; Hit Bargain; Tenser Timpani; Always You
- Past members: Kurt Feldman; Christoph Hochheim; Anton Hochheim; Adrian "Akira" Hashizume; Raphael Radna
- Website: Official site

The Depreciation Guild was an American dream pop and shoegaze band from Brooklyn, New York, formed in 2005 by lead vocalist and songwriter Kurt Feldman and guitarist Adrian Hashizume. Before disbanding, their lineup included Feldman, Christoph Hochheim (who later became the drummer and touring guitarist, respectively, for indie pop band the Pains of Being Pure at Heart), and Anton Hochheim (who later became the touring drummer for the Pains of Being Pure at Heart after Feldman's departure). They were joined for live performances by Raphael Radna on bass guitar.

== History ==
In 2003, Kurt Feldman started operating the DOS program NerdTracker II which allowed for the emulation of the Famicom (NES) 2A03 PSG 8-bit microprocessor for his music project, Approxim8. It was later evolved and heavily incorporated into the music he made with the Depreciation Guild. The band was formed in 2005. It was initially aimed as an outlet to express his musical hobby and interests in old video games, guitar pop, and electronic music. The band eventually took a more serious path, releasing their debut, digital-only EP, Nautilus, through chiptune label 8bitpeoples in 2006 and playing live shows. Feldman was aided by his high school friend Adrian Hashizume on guitar until 2007. Hashizume was then replaced by Feldman's college friend Christoph Hochheim. In 2008, Hochheim's identical twin brother Anton was added on drums. Their debut album, In Her Gentle Jaws, followed as a self-released free download in 2007. Kanine Records picked the band up in 2009 and reissued their debut album with some remastering. A second full-length, Spirit Youth, followed in mid-2010. The band also did remixes for artists such as Oh No Ono and Chateleine. Their song "Dream About Me" was featured in the 2010 film Kaboom.

In December 2010, they announced on their Facebook page that they would be disbanding after their final show in January 2011, citing musical differences within the band. The band played their scheduled final show on January 8, 2011 at Brooklyn's Rock Shop.

In August 2013, the original lineup of Kurt Feldman and Adrian Hashizume reunited for a one-off performance of In Her Gentle Jaws in its entirety at Glasslands Gallery in Brooklyn.

On March 8, 2023, the Depreciation Guild reunited to perform their first show in a decade at New York City's Mercury Lounge, celebrating the 20th anniversary of Kanine Records.

== Post-breakup ==
Since their separation, all three members were playing for the Pains of Being Pure at Heart with different final years; Feldman playing until 2013, Anton replacing Feldman on drums until 2017, and Christoph playing in 2009–2012 and from 2013 until the band's dissolution in 2019. In 2024, Feldman and Christoph rejoined the band alongside founding members Kip Berman and Peggy Wang.

In 2011, Feldman began his own solo career as Ice Choir and the Hochheims began their own duo career as then Ablebody (2011–2020); now Always You. The Hochheims also actively take parts as live musicians for other artists. Christoph has played for Dent May and is currently playing for Jerry Paper and Wild Nothing; Anton has played for Dinowalrus and is currently the drummer in Beach Fossils and Hit Bargain.

== Influences ==
Feldman has cited Tears for Fears, Talk Talk, Gangway, Scritti Politti, Cocteau Twins, and Pale Saints among the band's musical influences.

== Members ==
- Kurt Feldman – vocals, guitar, programming, production
- Christoph Hochheim – guitar, backing vocals
- Anton Hochheim – drums, percussion
- Adrian "Akira" Hashizume – guitar
- Raphael Radna – bass (touring)

== Discography ==
=== Studio albums ===
- In Her Gentle Jaws (self-released, 2007; Kanine Records, 2009)
- Spirit Youth (Kanine Records, 2010)

=== Extended plays ===
- Nautilus EP (8bitpeoples, 2006)

=== Singles ===
- "Dream About Me" single (Kanine Records, 2009)
- "Blue Lily" single (Kanine Records, 2010)
