= Higher Than the Stars =

EP by the Pains of Being Pure at Heart
- Released: September 22, 2009
- Genres: Indie pop, noise pop, twee pop
- Length: 19:09, 31:06 (iTunes Version)
- Labels: Slumberland Records (US); Fortuna Pop! (UK)
- Producer: Danny Taylor / Archie Moore

The Pains of Being Pure at Heart chronology
| The Pains of Being Pure at Heart (2009) | Higher Than the Stars (2009) | Belong (2011) |

Higher Than the Stars is the second EP by the New York indie band the Pains of Being Pure at Heart released on September 22, 2009. The EP was announced July 23 of 2009.

== Track listing ==
=== iTunes Digital Track listing ===
1. "Higher Than the Stars" – 3:49
2. "103" – 2:03
3. "Falling Over" – 3:11
4. "Twins" – 3:18
5. "Higher Than the Stars (Saint Etienne Visits Lord Spank Mix)" – 6:48
6. "Falling over (DJ Downfall Sprechenbann Mix)" – 3:12 (iTunes bonus track)
7. "Higher Than the Stars (Skanfrom Remix)" – 4:46 (iTunes bonus track)
8. "Higher Than the Stars (Others in Conversation Remix)" – 3:59 (iTunes bonus track)

=== CD Track listing ===
1. "Higher Than the Stars" – 3:49
2. "103" – 2:03
3. "Falling Over" – 3:11
4. "Twins" – 3:18
5. "Higher Than the Stars (Saint Etienne Visits Lord Spank Mix)" – 6:48

=== 12" EP Track Listing ===
1. "Higher Than the Stars" – 3:49
2. "103" – 2:03
3. "Falling Over" – 3:11
4. "Twins" – 3:18

=== 12" Remix EP Track Listing ===
1. "Higher Than the Stars (Saint Etienne Visits Lord Spank Mix)" – 6:48
2. "Falling over (DJ Downfall Sprechenbann Mix)" – 3:12
3. "Higher Than the Stars (Skanfrom Remix)" – 4:46

=== 7" Single (Clear Vinyl) ===
1. "Higher Than the Stars" – 3:49
2. "Higher Than the Stars (Others in Conversation Remix)" – 3:59
