= Country Mice =

Indie-rock band

Country Mice (formerly We Are Country Mice) is an indie-rock band formed in Brooklyn, NY in 2008. The band released its debut album, Twister, on Wao Wao Records, an imprint of Kanine Records in 2011. Twister received positive reviews, including an 8/10 rating from Spin Magazine, and was supported with extensive touring. In 2013, Country Mice released a second album, recorded in Los Angeles with producer Doug Boehm (Girls, Dr. Dog, Drive By Truckers, The Whigs), titled Hour of the Wolf. Country Mice has been compared Wilco, Neil Young, Dinosaur Jr., and Sonic Youth.

== Discography ==
=== Full-length albums ===
- Hour of the Wolf (Milohead Records 2013)
- Twister (Wao Wao Records 2011)

=== 7" records ===
- "Make Your Own Damn Fun" ["A Good Old Fashioned Barn Raising"/"Ballad of John"] (Lotion Records 2009)
- "There's No Other"/"Bullet of a Gun" (Wao Wao Records 2009)

=== Cassettes ===
- Transmissions (Wao Wao Records 2010)
