= The Pains of Being Pure at Heart =

American indie pop band

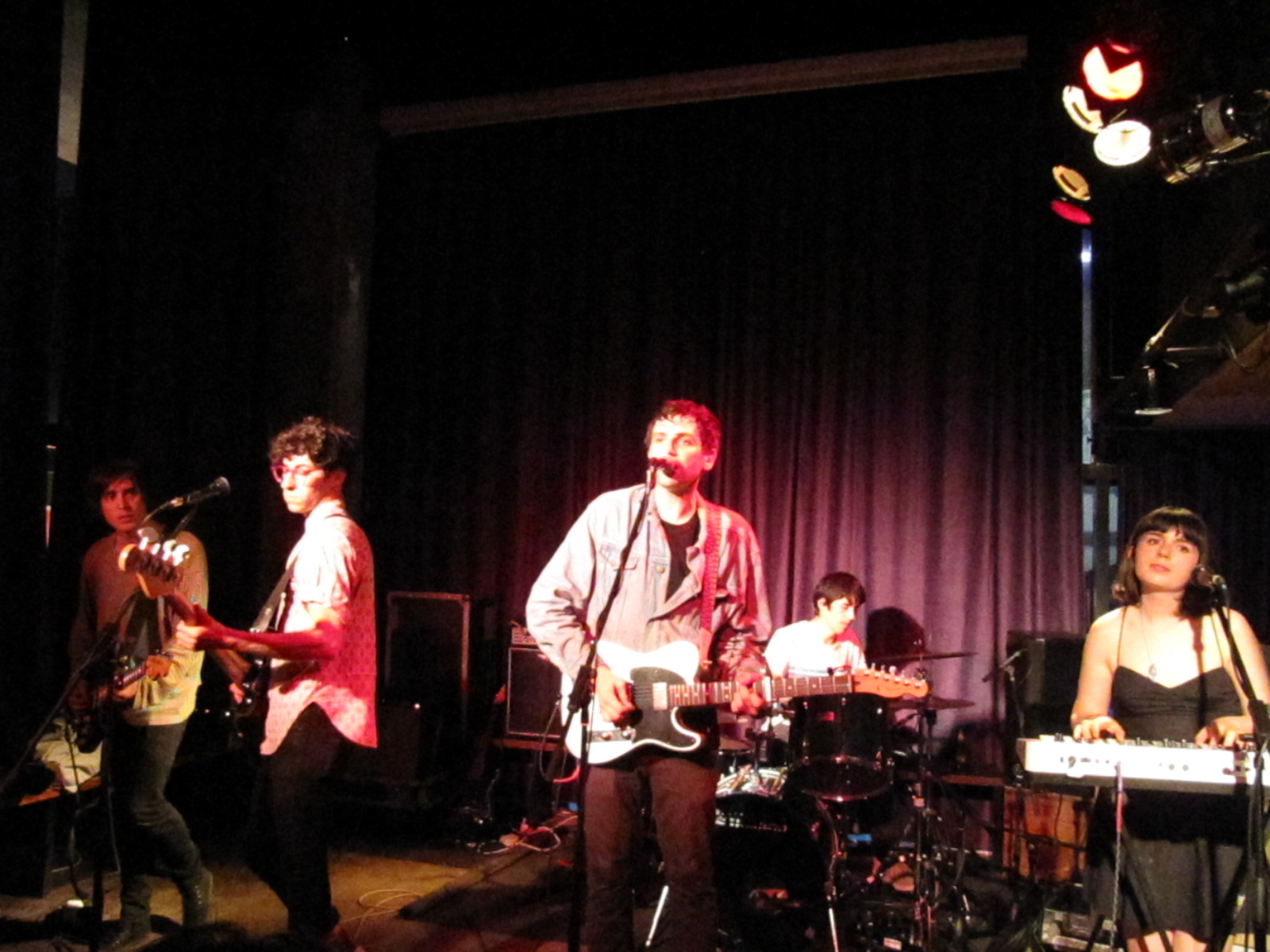
- The Pains of Being Pure at Heart performing in 2014

Background information
- Origin: New York City, New York, U.S.
- Genres: Indie pop; noise pop (early); shoegaze; synthpop
- Years active: 2007–2019; 2024–present
- Labels: Slumberland; Fortuna Pop!; PIAS; Painbow
- Spinoffs: The Depreciation Guild; Ice Choir; Ablebody; Roman à Clef; Massage; Store Front; The Natvral; Always You
- Members: Kip Berman; Peggy Wang; Christoph Hochheim; Alex Naidus; Kurt Feldman
- Website: thepainsofbeingpureatheart.com

The Pains of Being Pure at Heart are an American indie pop band from New York City. The band was formed by Kip Berman (vocals, guitar), Peggy Wang (keyboards, vocals), Alex Naidus (bass), and Kurt Feldman (drums) in 2007. Their current lineup includes all original members, along with longtime touring guitarist Christoph Hochheim and Brian Alvarez, who has served as the band's touring drummer in place of Feldman, who remains involved with the band offstage after the band's Spain and Portugal tour in 2025.

The band broke up in 2019 after a couple of lineup changes since 2012, with Berman being the only constant member. In August 2024, it was announced that the Pains of Being Pure at Heart were reforming.

== History ==
=== Formation and early years (2007–2012) ===
Kip Berman, lead singer, guitarist, and principal songwriter, grew up in Philadelphia, but moved to Portland, Oregon, where he lived for several years. Berman played in numerous bands during that time. After finishing his college degree at Reed College, he moved to New York City, where he met Alex Naidus. The two bonded over their adoration for music, and their similar upbringing. Bands such as Smashing Pumpkins, The Field Mice, Black Tambourine, and Nirvana helped to establish the two as friends. Soon after, the trio played at the birthday party of friend and bandmate Peggy Wang. According to the musicians, they played "five songs in ten minutes, and the song names were longer than the songs". Using a backing track as a drummer, half of this setlist helped formulate the debut album. It was their first show, and they played alongside the bands The Manhattan Love Suicides and Titus Andronicus.

In mid 2007, the Pains started a MySpace page to showcase their songs. Berman noted that at the time, the band name was all the group had. The name comes from the title of an unpublished children's story by Charles Augustus Steen III (a friend of Berman's), which revolves around "realising what matters most in life – things like friendship and having a good time". The trio began working on numerous tracks. Songs such as "Contender", "Come Saturday", and "This Love Is Fucking Right!" would stay band favorites, winding up on the 2009 album The Pains of Being Pure at Heart. Other tracks, such as "Orchard of My Eye", would be released on their first EP. It was at the time of their MySpace uploads that attention was being drawn to the act. The trio toured with The Zenith (band) and performed at the Athens Popfest in August 2007 Prominent music websites, such as Pitchfork and Stereogum, kept tabs on The Pains of Being Pure at Heart. The latter named them a "Band to Watch" in 2007.

After numerous shows around New York, the trio recruited Berman's roommate Kurt Feldman as drummer. After playing more shows, both in and outside of the US the band recorded their inaugural LP. Their first self-released EP came out in 2007 on Painbow, a label created by the band. Their debut self-titled full-length album was released on February 3, 2009, via Slumberland Records, a favorite label of the band's. The album peaked at number nine on the Billboard Heatseekers chart. In 2009, they released Higher Than the Stars, their second EP.

The band's second album, entitled Belong, was released in 2011. It was produced by Flood and mixed by Alan Moulder. It represented their commercial peak, reaching number 92 on the Billboard 200. It also charted worldwide, reaching the top 100 in Belgium, France, the United Kingdom, and Spain. Like the debut, it also received a glowing "Best New Music" review from Pitchfork.

=== Later years and disbandment (2013–2019) ===
Following Belong, the band saw major lineup shifts leaving Berman as the sole remaining member. In 2012, guitarist Christoph Hochheim left after the album's tour cycle. In 2013, keyboardist/vocalist Peggy Wang quit to focus on her job at BuzzFeed and her upcoming cookbook. After recording his parts for the upcoming album, bassist Alex Naidus also left in 2013 to work at BuzzFeed. Feldman left to focus on producing and engineering work.

The group moved to New York-based label Yebo Music for the third effort, Days of Abandon, released in May 2014. It featured Kelly Pratt on horns and Jen Goma of A Sunny Day in Glasgow on backing vocals. As a live band, the Pains featured bassist Jacob Sloan, keyboardist Jessica Weiss, guest vocalist Goma, and the return of Hochheim on guitar, alongside his brother Anton on drums.

Their fourth album, The Echo of Pleasure, was released on September 1, 2017, and self-distributed by the band.

The group recorded a full album cover of Tom Petty's 1989 album Full Moon Fever for subscription-based label Turntable Kitchen, released in November 2018. On November 4, 2019, Berman announced that he had disbanded the project. He described feeling disconnected from the music he was writing after The Echo of Pleasure. In addition, he had relocated to New Jersey and became a father, suggesting the band was a "distinct moment" in his life that had passed. The band's final show before breaking up was on April 26, 2018, at a birthday party for Stereogum founder Scott Lapatine.

Berman has continued making music under the moniker the Natvral.

=== Reformation (2024–present) ===
On August 16, 2024, the band announced that they would reform to celebrate the 15-year-anniversary of their debut album by touring Spain and Portugal in February 2025. The lineup for the tour included all of the original members, except Naidus who was replaced by the Natvral's member Eddy Marshall. The tour was expanded later that year to North America and the UK, with Naidus returning to the band and Feldman being replaced by Brian Alvarez.

In February 2025, Slumberland Records released Perfect Right Now: A Slumberland Collection 2008-2010, a compilation of the band's non-album outtake songs from their debut era. On February 17, 2025, the band played their first show in seven years and the first with Wang and Feldman since 2012. It took place in New York and was announced as a last-minute surprise.

== Musical style and influences ==
AllMusic said the band "follow the noise pop template of balancing fragile, sensitive melodies with walls of distortion and fuzz." The band's early material was considered to be raw noise pop that drew influence from acts such as My Bloody Valentine or Black Tambourine. The band gradually adopted an alternative rock-influenced sound that cleaner slicker production values.

== Members ==
=== Current ===
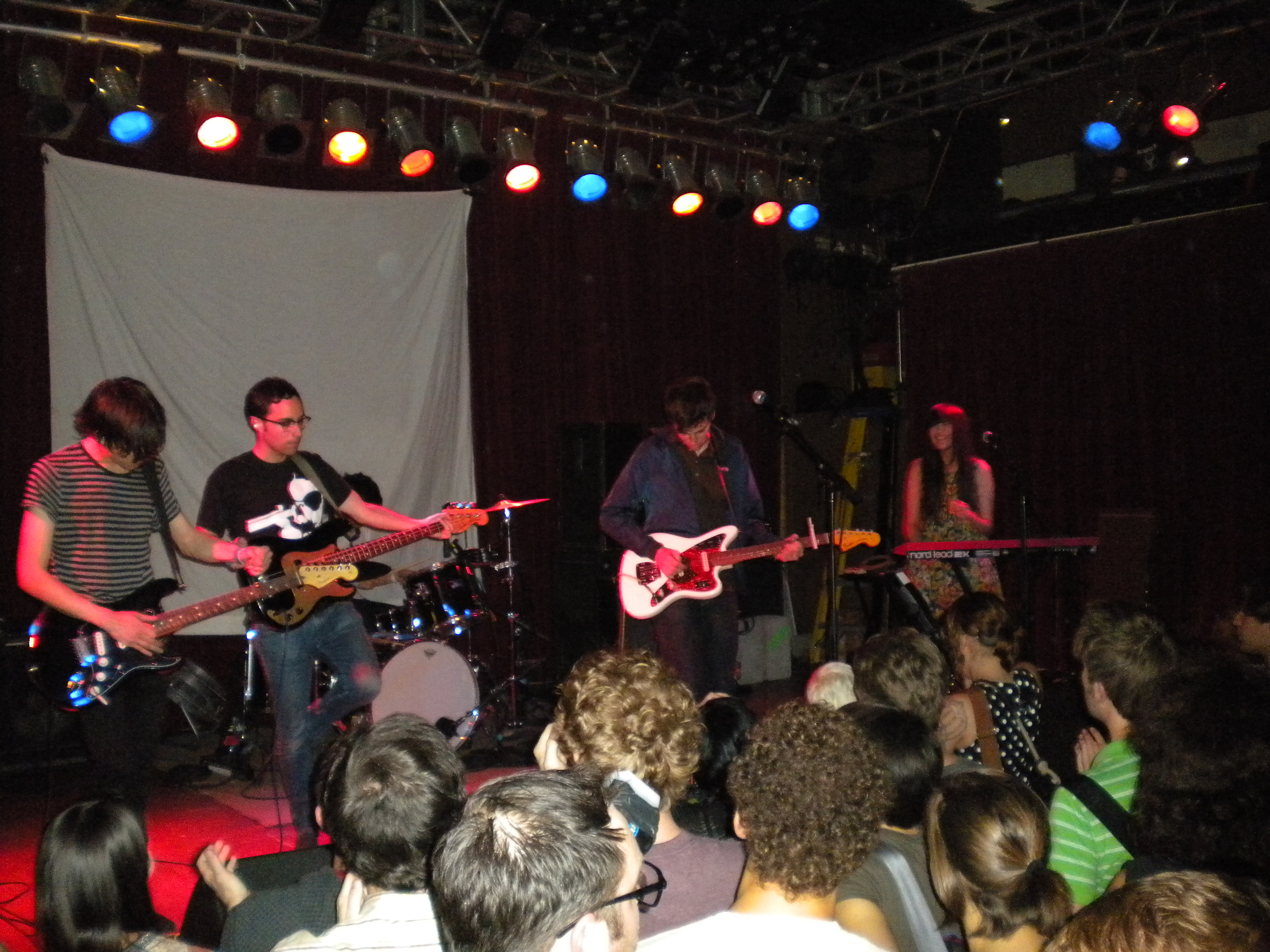
The Pains of Being Pure at Heart performing in Seattle in 2009

- Kip Berman – vocals, guitar (2007–2019, 2024–present)
- Peggy Wang – keyboards, vocals (2007–2013, 2024–present)
- Alex Naidus – bass (2007–2013, 2025–present)
- Christoph Hochheim – guitar (2009–2019, 2024–present)
- Brian Alvarez - drums (touring) (2018-present)

=== Inactive ===
- Kurt Feldman – drums (2007–2013, 2024–present)

=== Former ===
- Eddy Marshall – bass
- Anton Hochheim – drums
- Chris Schackerman – drums
- Connor Hanwick – guitar
- Jacob Sloan – bass, vocals
- Jess Krichelle Rojas – vocals, keyboard
- Elspeth Vance – vocals
- Jen Goma – vocals, keyboard
- Jess Weiss – vocals, keyboard
- Drew Citron – keyboard

== Discography ==
=== Albums ===
==== Studio albums ====
List of studio albums, with selected chart positions
Title	Album details	Peak chart positions									
Title	Album details	US	US Indie	US Rock	BEL	FRA	JPN	JPN Indie	SPA	UK	UK Indie
The Pains of Being Pure at Heart	Released: February 3, 2009; Label: Slumberland; Formats: CD, LP, digital download	— (Note: The Pains of Being Pure at Heart did not enter the US Billboard 200, but peaked at number nine on the US Heatseekers Albums Chart.)	37	—	—	—	—	81	—	— (Note: The Pains of Being Pure at Heart did not enter the UK Albums Chart, but peaked at number 26 on the UK Record Store Chart.)	43
Belong	Released: March 29, 2011; Label: Slumberland; Formats: CD, LP, digital download	92	18	27	69	167	63	—	80	109	15
Days of Abandon	Released: May 13, 2014; Label: Yebo; Formats: CD, LP, digital download, streaming	168	32	49	—	—	59	25	—	—	33
The Echo of Pleasure	Released: September 1, 2017; Label: Painbow; Formats: CD, LP, digital download, streaming	—	—	—	—	—	—	—	—	—	—
Full Moon Fever	Released: October 2, 2019; Label: Turntable Kitchen; Formats: CD, LP, digital download, streaming; Notes: Cover of Tom Petty's album of the same name	—	—	—	—	—	—	—	—	—	—
"—" denotes a recording that did not chart or was not released in that territory.

==== Compilation albums ====
List of compilation albums
Title	Album details
Acid Reflex	Released: April 21, 2012; Label: Yoshimoto R and C; Formats: CD; Notes: Compilation of Acid Reflex EP with Higher Than The Stars remixes plus one additional remix.
Perfect Right Now: A Slumberland Collection 2008-2010	Released: February 7, 2025; Label: Slumberland; Formats: CD, LP, digital download, streaming

=== EPs ===
List of extended plays
Title	EP details	Peak chart positions			
Title	EP details	US Dance	FRA	UK Phys.	UK Indie Brkr
The Pains of Being Pure at Heart EP	Released: August 7, 2007; Label: Painbow; Formats: CD, 7"	—	—	—	—
Higher Than the Stars	Released: September 22, 2009; Label: Slumberland, Fortuna Pop!; Formats: CD, 7"	1	94	23	19
Acid Reflex	Released: February 27, 2012; Label: Play It Again Sam; Formats: CD, 7"	—	—	74	—
Abandonment Issue	Released: May 13, 2014; Label: Yebo; Formats: CD, 7"	—	—	—	—
Hell	Released: November 13, 2015; Label: Painbow; Formats: CD, 7"	—	—	51	—
"—" denotes a recording that did not chart or was not released in that territory.

=== Singles ===
==== As lead artist ====
List of singles, with selected chart positions, showing year released and album name
Title	Year	Peak chart positions						Album
Title	Year	US Dance	FRA	MEX Ing.	SCO	UK Phys.	UK Indie	Album
"Everything with You"	2008	—	—	—	—	—	35	The Pains of Being Pure at Heart
"Kurt Cobain's Cardigan"	2008	—	—	—	—	—	—	Non-album single
"Young Adult Friction"	2009	—	—	—	68	56	13	The Pains of Being Pure at Heart
"Come Saturday"	2009	—	—	—	53	44	—	The Pains of Being Pure at Heart
"Higher Than the Stars"	2010	1	94	—	—	23	— (Note: "Higher Than the Stars" did not enter the UK Independent Singles Chart, but peaked at number 19 on the UK Independent Singles Breakers Chart.)	Higher Than the Stars
"Say No to Love / Lost Saint"	2010	—	—	30	—	31	—	Non-album single
"Heart in Your Heartbreak"	2010	—	98	—	—	—	—	Belong
"Belong"	2011	—	—	—	—	26	—	Belong
"The Body"	2011	—	—	—	—	25	—	Belong
"Jeremy / My Life Is Wrong"	2012	—	—	—	—	28	—	Non-album single
"Simple and Sure"	2014	—	—	—	—	23	—	Days of Abandon
"Eurydice"	2014	—	—	—	—	—	—	Days of Abandon
"Until The Sun Explodes"	2014	—	—	—	—	—	—	Days of Abandon
"Poison Touch"	2014	—	—	—	—	—	—	Days of Abandon (Deluxe)
"Kelly"	2014	—	—	—	—	—	—	Days of Abandon
"Laid"	2015	—	—	—	—	—	—	Hell
"Hell"	2015	—	—	—	—	51	—	Hell
"China"	2015	—	—	—	—	—	—	Non-album single
"Anymore"	2017	—	—	—	—	—	—	The Echo Of Pleasure
"When I Dance With You"	2017	—	—	—	—	—	—	The Echo Of Pleasure
"My Only"	2017	—	—	—	—	—	—	The Echo Of Pleasure
"So True"	2017	—	—	—	—	—	—	The Echo Of Pleasure
"Runnin' Down a Dream"	2018	—	—	—	—	—	—	Full Moon Fever
"Free Fallin'"	2018	—	—	—	—	—	—	Full Moon Fever
"Sometimes Always" (with Hatchie)	2020	—	—	—	—	—	—	Non-album single
"—" denotes a recording that did not chart or was not released in that territory.

==== Split singles ====
- The Pains of Being Pure at Heart/The Parallelograms, split 7-inch with The Parallelograms (Atomic Beat, 2008)
- Searching for the Now Volume 4, split 7-inch with Summer Cats (Slumberland, 2008)

== Bibliography ==
- Wong, Martin (2009). "Growing Pains". Giant Robot Magazine, issue 61.
