= Uwe Kliche =

German weightlifter

Personal information
- Nationality: German
- Born: 3 March 1938 (age 87); Flensburg, Germany

Sport
- Sport: Weightlifting

Uwe Kliche (born 3 March 1938) is a German weightlifter. He competed at the 1968 Summer Olympics and the 1972 Summer Olympics.
