= Escape Artists (Austrian band) =

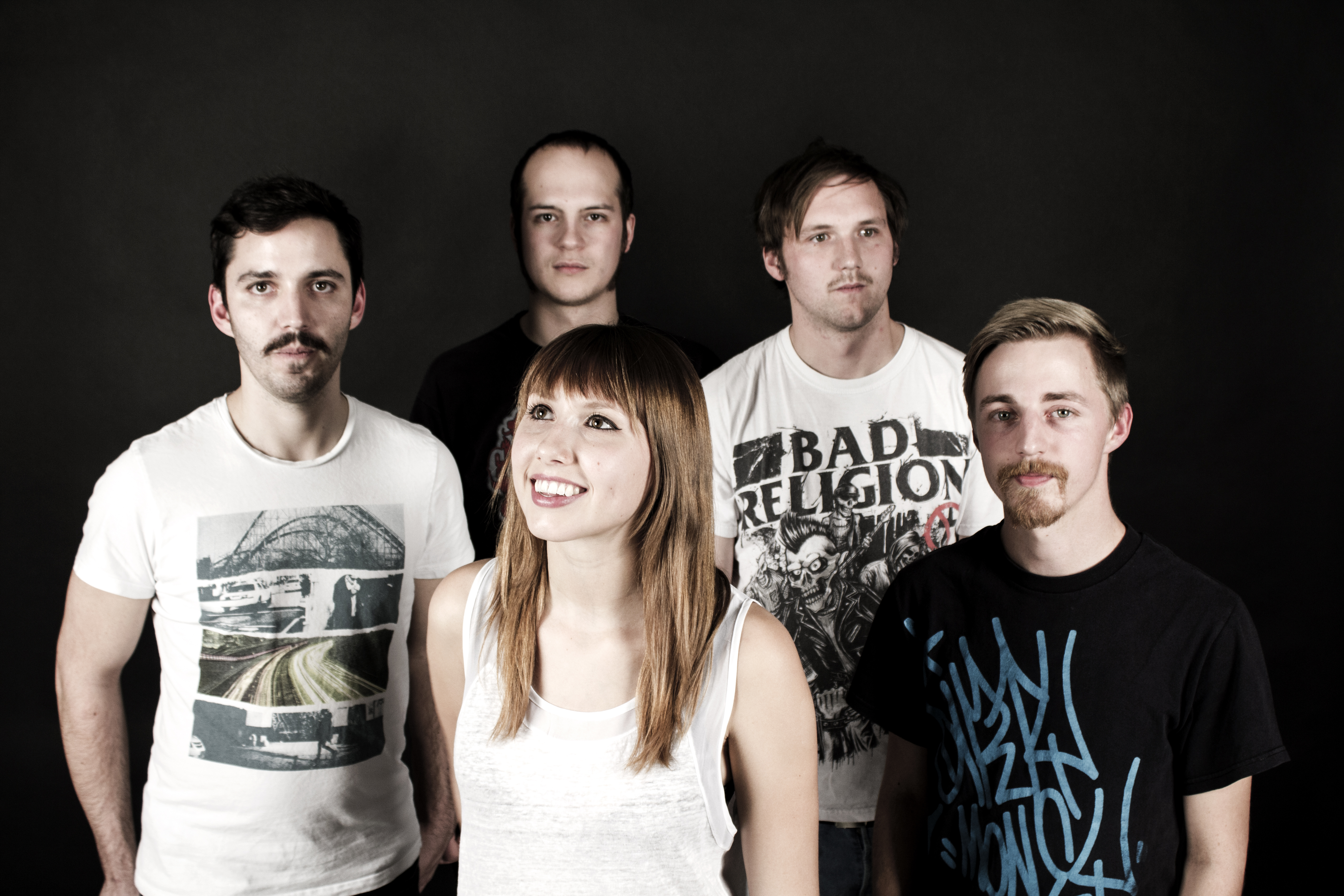

Background information
- Origin: Vienna, Austria
- Genres: Pop punk
- Years active: 2009–
- Labels: Timezone Records
- Members: Pia Glasl; Georg Glasl; Matthias Fellinger; Mario Chytil; Lukas Jelencsits
- Past members: Benjamin Cox (2012)
- Website: escapeartists.at

Escape Artists is a female-fronted Austrian pop punk band from Vienna and Lower Austria.

== History ==
The band was founded by Georg Glasl and Matthias Fellinger, the two guitarists, formerly playing in a band called Substitute. The catchy voice of Pia Glasl, Lukas Jelencsits on the drums and Mario Chytil on the bass (he replaced Ben Cox in 2012) complete the quintet. "Escape Artists Never Die", a song of the Welsh post-hardcore band Funeral for a Friend, was the decisive factor to name the band as the two founding members are attached to it. In 2009 they released their first EP called 100 Beats per Minute. The song Nightmare is even part of Punk Kills Vol. 10, a Californian sampler. In early 2013 the debut album Tales in tune was published by Timezone Records.

== Discography ==
=== Demos ===
- 2009: 100 Beats per Minutes

=== Sampler ===
- 2009: Punk Kills Vol. 10.

=== Records ===
- 2013: Tales in Tune
