= Yamaha PortaSound =

1980s portable electronic keyboards

Yamaha PortaSound (and PortaTone) were a series of consumer-grade electronic musical keyboards were produced by the Yamaha Corporation thoroughout the 1980s, 1990s and the early 2000s. The name suggests the instruments' portability, with battery operation and integral speakers being a consistent feature across the line, and were generally aimed at hobbyists, home users and for educational use. The instruments almost always featured some sort of built-in drum machine with an auto accompaniment (arranger) function. The most prolific of both series have been the dynasty of PSS (mini/half-sized keys) and PSR (full-size keys) numbered models which continue to form the basis of Yamaha's home keyboard offering to the present day.

Yamaha's closest competition was from Casio was their corresponding Casiotone series of instruments, although other major rivals Roland and Korg later entered the market with similar products.

== PortaSound (PSS/VSS) ==
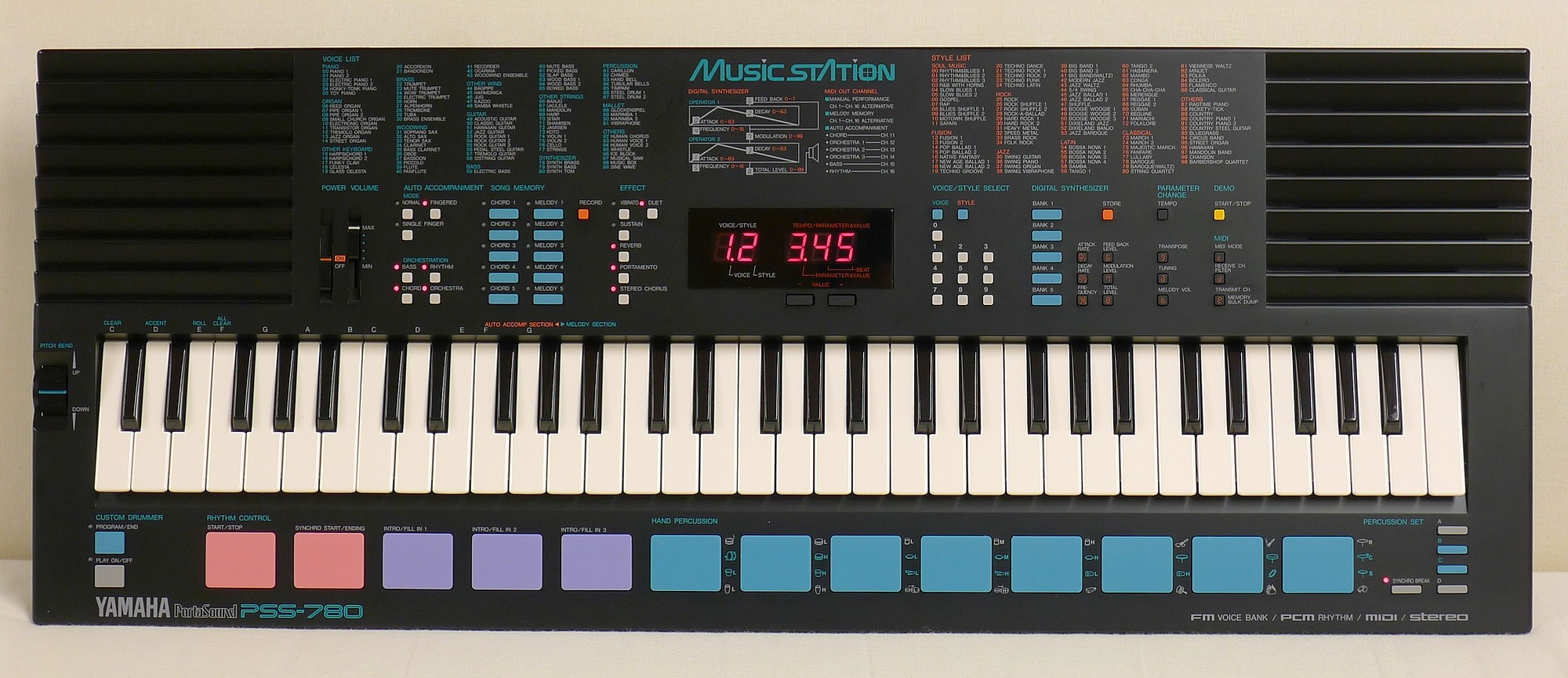
Yamaha PSS-780 (1989)

The PortaSound models (which generally carried the PS or PSS model prefix, or VSS if the keyboard had sampling capability) were designed for children with half sized keys and simple preset functions suitable for educational use.. The cheapest models in the PSS line were quite toy-like in appearance and presentation, whilst the most expensive models had simplified versions of features found in professional synthesisers such as MIDI connectivity, primitive recording or sequencer capability and even sampler functions. In 1982, the line introduced a card reader system which allowed players to learn and play along with sequenced songs. Some PortaSound models from the late 1980s, such as the PSS-480/680 (1988); are valued for their lo-fi emulations of Yamaha DX7 sounds which are of use to composers of synthwave music (see "Contemporary use" below).

== PortaTone (PSR/DSR) ==
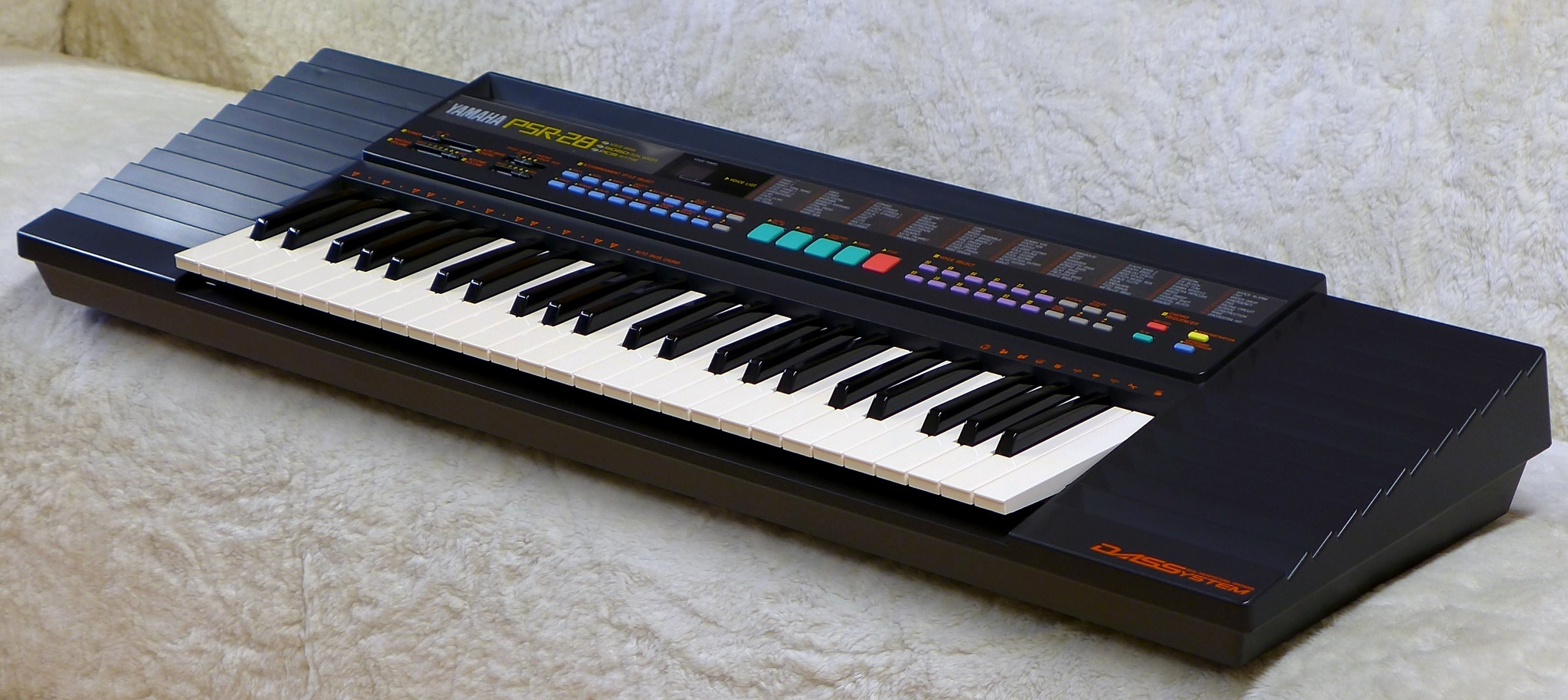
PSR-28 (1990)

The concurrent PortaTone (PSR or DSR model prefix) line of keyboards featured full-size keys (therefore were aimed at older children and adults), but again the instruments were primarily aimed at hobbyists and home users. As with the PortaSound models, many of the more expensive variants in the series borrowed features from Yamaha's professional products; an example being the early flagship model PSR-70 (1985), which used a cut-down version of the company's famous FM Synthesis tone generation system as found in its DX series of synthesisers.

Following competition in the 1990s from Roland (with its E-Series and G-Series models), and Korg (with its i-Series) which moved auto accompaniment keyboards further into the professional realm, Yamaha was forced to respond with more advanced PSR keyboards (which often borrowed from its high end Electone home organs) which were aimed at a much higher price point, culminating in models such as the PSR-6700 (1991) and PSR-9000 (1999) - these flagship models were aimed squarely at professionals with full sound editing capability, sequencing, effects and programmable rhythm arrangements. Yamaha eventually split its flagship/professional auto accompaniment keyboard line into a separate brand - away from PortaSound/PSR - with the Tyros series of instruments in the 2000s, and more recently the Genos line.

== Contemporary use ==
Electronic musicians and sound engineers have used these instruments to achieve an authentic lo-fi sound and some modify them with circuit bending to extend their sound palettes. As of 2015, musician Dan Friel continues to use a Portasound that he received as a gift in 1984. Circa 2017, Italian artist Modula released an EP called 780's Chronicles, recorded primarily using a Yamaha PSS780. Cyril Hahn uses a Yamaha PSS380 in his original compositions, and notes its noise profile as an endearing characteristic.

== Unofficial software and VST plug-ins ==
In the 21st century, several independent software developers have produced additional tools to modify and store patches for midi-capable PSS/PSR keyboards, such as PSS Edit, PSS Wave Editor and CTRLR. VST plug-in soft-synth versions of some of these keyboards have also been released by various developers, including the Yamaha PSS-170 and PSS-480 by Audio Animals, GSS-370 (based on the PSS370 keyboard) and PortaFM.
