= Gangway (band) =

Danish band

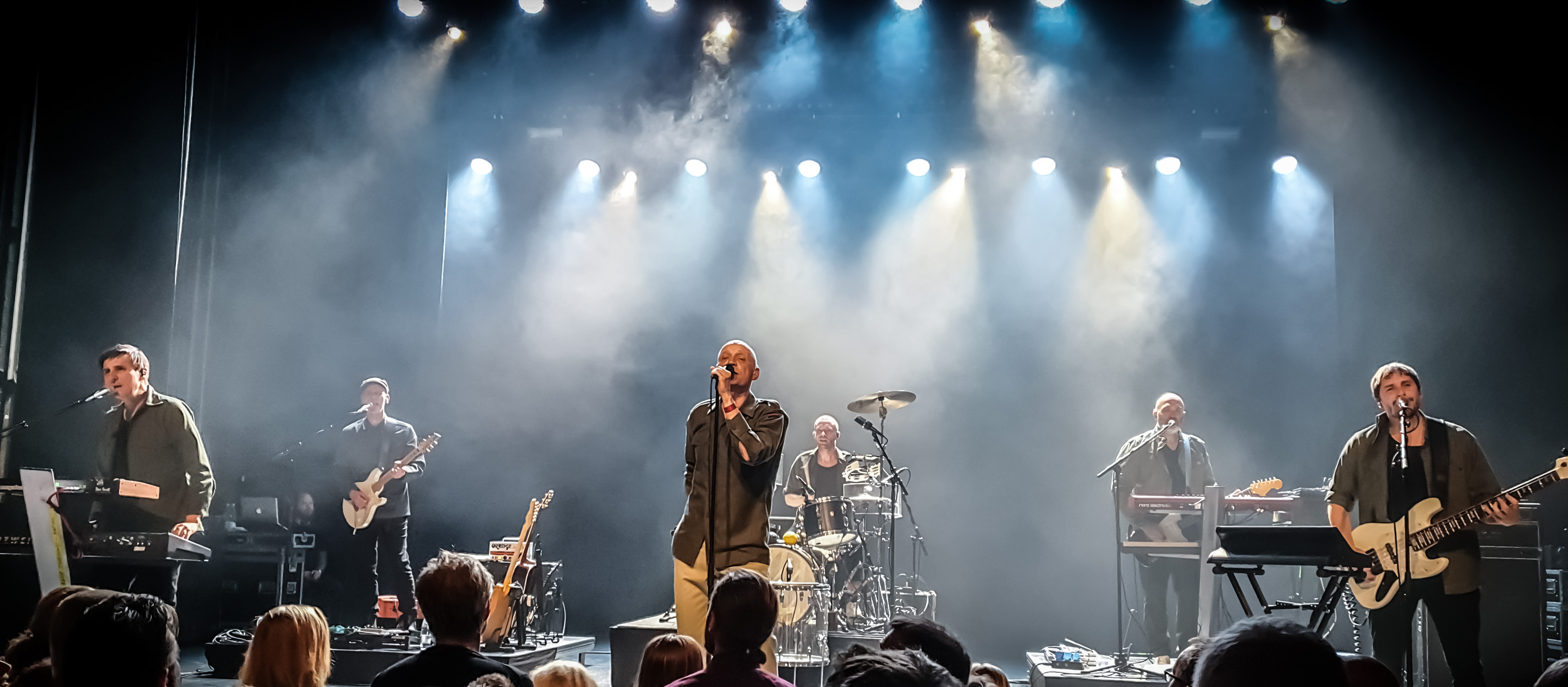
- Gangway live at Vega, Copenhagen, 4 May 2019

Background information
- Origin: Copenhagen, Denmark
- Years active: 1982–1998, 2017–present
- Labels: Irmgardz, PolyGram, Electra, BMG
- Members: Allan Jensen; Henrik Balling; Torben Johansen
- Past members: Jan Christensen; Gorm Ravn-Joensen; Cai Bojsen-Møller; Jeppe Moesgaard

Gangway is a Danish band, originally active from 1982 to 1998 and again since 2017. Gangway consisted of Allan Jensen (lead singer), Henrik Balling (guitar), Torben Johansen (of Escape Artists, keyboards), and four different drummers, Jan Christensen (1982–84), Gorm Ravn-Jonsen (1984–89), Cai Bojsen-Møller (1991–94), and Jeppe Moesgaard (1996–98).

== Original career ==
Their first three albums had a Beatles (and sometimes Smiths-esque) guitar pop sound, with a distinct new wave twist, but later on, particularly on The Quiet Boy Ate the Whole Cake, their influences were more on synthpop, such as that of the Pet Shop Boys. They are also known for their strange and subtle lyrics that are often on the verge of surrealism.

Their best-known song, "My Girl and Me", was a big hit in Denmark in 1988 and was also played on MTV. It received regular airplay on the modern rock radio station KITS in San Francisco.

The band broke up in 1998, bar a one-off reunion show in October 2006.

== 2017 reunion ==
In spring of 2017, Gangway announced a reunion tour. Beginning in October, they played two sold-out gigs at DR Koncerthuset. The shows received great critical acclaim and were followed by two more shows in Danish cities Aarhus and Aalborg. The line-up for these shows was Henrik Balling, Allan Jensen and Torben Johansen backed by drummer Janus Nevel Ringsted (formerly of Spleen United), keyboard player René Munk Thalund (of Nephew) and bass player Carl-Erik Riestra. During the shows Gorm Ravn-Jonsen made a special appearance.

In 2018 the band released their first new recordings since the 1990s with the single "Colourful Combinations". The following year, they released an album, Whatever It Is, their first for 23 years.

== Discography ==
=== Albums ===
- The Twist (1984)
- Sitting in the Park (1986)
- Sitting in the Park Again (1988)
- The Quiet Boy Ate the Whole Cake (1991)
- Happy Ever After (1992)
- Optimism (1994)
- That's Life (1996)
- Compendium (compilation, 1998)
- Whatever It Is (2019)

=== Singles ===
- 1985 "Out on the Rebound from Love" (Irmgardz Records)
- 1985 "Once Bitten, Twice Shy" (Irmgardz)
- 1986 "My Girl and Me" (Irmgardz)
- 1988 "My Girl and Me (re-recording)" (PolyGram Records)
- 1991 "Going Away" (Elektra Records)
- 1992 "Didn't I Make You Laugh" (BMG Records)
- 1992 "Mountain Song" (BMG)
- 1993 "Never Say Goodbye" (BMG)
- 1993 "Once in a While" (BMG)
- 1994 "Everything Seems to Go My Way" (BMG)
- 1994 "Steady Income" (BMG)
- 1994 "Sycamore Sundays" (BMG)
- 1996 "Come Back as a Dog" (BMG)
- 1997 "Why Do I Miss You" (BMG)
- 2018 "Colourful Combinations" (RCA Records/Sony Music)
- 2018 "Don't Want to Go Home" (RCA/Sony)
- 2019 "Confident and Ordinary" (RCA/Sony)
- 2019 "See if I Care" (RCA/Sony)
- 2020 "Married" (Bridge)
