= Daniel Lopatin discography =

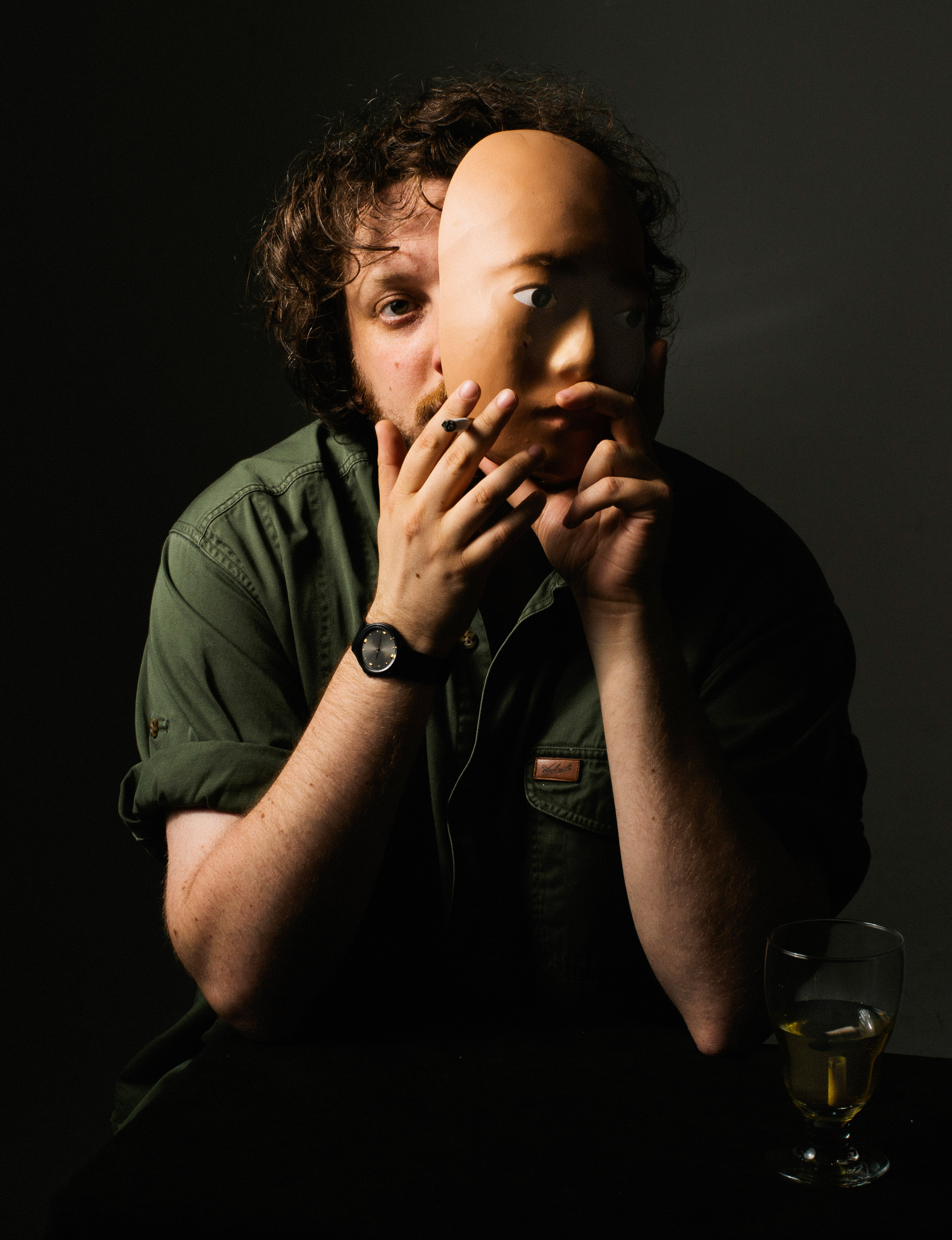
- Lopatin in 2013
- Studio albums: 13
- EPs: 14
- Soundtrack albums: 4
- Compilation albums: 3
- Singles: 26
- Video albums: 1
- Split albums: 1

Daniel Lopatin is a Brooklyn-based experimental musician who records primarily under the pseudonym Oneohtrix Point Never. Early in his career as both a solo artist and as a member of several groups, he released a number of LPs and extended plays on a variety of independent labels. In 2010, he signed to Editions Mego and released Returnal. In 2011, he founded the record label Software. In 2013, Lopatin signed to British electronic label Warp Records and released his label debut R Plus Seven.

== As Oneohtrix Point Never ==
=== Studio albums ===
List of studio albums, with selected chart positions
Title	Album details	Peak chart positions								
Title	Album details	US Dance	US Heat.	US Ind.	BEL (FL)	BEL (WA)	JPN	UK	UK Dance	UK Ind.
Betrayed in the Octagon	Released: November 20, 2007; Label: Deception Island; Format: Digital download, LP	—	—	—	—	—	—	—	—	—
Zones Without People	Released: August 6, 2009; Label: Arbor; Format: Digital download, LP	—	—	—	—	—	—	—	—	—
Russian Mind	Released: November 9, 2009; Label: No Fun; Format: Digital download, LP	—	—	—	—	—	—	—	—	—
Returnal	Released: June 22, 2010; Label: Mego; Format: Digital download, LP, CD	—	—	—	—	—	—	—	—	—
Replica	Released: November 8, 2011; Label: Mexican Summer, Software; Format: Digital download, LP, CD, cassette	10	7	—	—	—	—	—	—	—
R Plus Seven	Released: October 1, 2013; Label: Warp; Format: Digital download, LP, CD	11	16	—	111	—	—	134	28	37
Garden of Delete	Released: November 13, 2015; Label: Warp; Format: Digital download, LP, CD	2	2	14	95	199	108	149	18	18
Age Of	Released: June 1, 2018; Label: Warp; Format: Digital download, streaming, LP, CD	8	4	—	121	—	109	—	11	13
Magic Oneohtrix Point Never	Released: October 30, 2020; Label: Warp; Format: Digital download, streaming, LP, CD, cassette	8	13	—	—	—	170	—	—	15
Again	Released: September 29, 2023; Label: Ridge Valley Digital, Warp; Format: Digital download, streaming, LP, CD, cassette	—	—	—	—	—	—	—	—	—
Tranquilizer	Released: November 21, 2025; Label: Warp; Format: Digital download, streaming, LP, CD	—	—	—	—	—	—	—	—	22

=== Extended plays and cassettes ===
- Transmat Memories (2008, Taped Sounds)
- A Pact Between Strangers (2008, Gneiss Things)
- Hollyr (2008, Sound Holes)
- Ruined Lives (2008, Young Tapes)
- Heart of a Champion (2008, Mistake By The Lake Tapes)
- KGB Nights/Blue Drive (credited to KGB Man/Oneohtrix Point Never) (2009, Catholic Tapes)
- Young Beidnahga (2009, Ruralfaune)
- Caboladies/Oneohtrix Point Never Split (2009, NNA Tapes)
- Scenes with Curved Objects (2009, Utmarken)
- Dog in the Fog - 'Replica' Collaborations & Remixes (2012, Software)
- Commissions I (2014, Warp)
- Commissions II (2015, Warp)
- The Station (2018, Warp)
- Love in the Time of Lexapro (2018, Warp)
- KCRW Session (2019, Warp)
- Drive Time Suite (2020, Warp)
- Midday Suite (2020, Warp)
- Oneohtrix Point Never - Scores (2024, Warp)
- Oneohtrix Point Never - Ambients (2024, Warp)
- Oneohtrix Point Never - Vocals (2024, Warp)
- Tra (2025, Warp)

=== Singles ===
- "Sleep Dealer" (2011, Software)
- "Replica" (2011, Software)
- "Still Life" (2013, Warp)
- "Problem Areas" (2013, Warp)
- "Chrome Country" (2013, Warp)
- "Zebra" (2013, Warp)
- "Bubs" with A. G. Cook (2014, Warp)
- "Rush" (2014, Warp)
- "I Bite Through It" (2015, Warp)
- "Mutant Standard" (2015, Warp)
- "Sticky Drama" (2015, Warp)
- "Sticky Drama (A .G. Cook Remix)" (2016, Warp)
- "The Pure and the Damned" feat. Iggy Pop (2017, Warp)
- "Leaving The Park" (2017, Warp)
- "Black Snow" (2018, Warp)
- "We'll Take It" (2018, Warp)
- "The Station" (2018, Warp)
- "Love In The Time Of Lexapro" (2018, Warp)
- "Last Known Image Of A Song (Ryuichi Sakamoto Rework)" (2018, Warp)
- "Lost But Never Alone (Forced Smile Edit)" (2020, Warp)
- "Nothing's Special" feat. Rosalía (2021, Warp)
- "Tales From The Trash Stratum" feat. Elizabeth Fraser (2021, Warp)
- "A Barely Lit Path" (2023, Warp)
- "Measuring Ruins" (2026, Warp)
- "Cherry Blue" (2026, Warp)
- "D.I.S." (2026, Warp)
- "Rodl Glide" (2026, Warp)
- "Dim Stars / For Residue (Extended)" (2026, Warp)

=== Compilation albums ===
- Rifts 2-CD (2009, No Fun); 3-CD (2012, Software)
- Drawn and Quartered (2013, Software)
- The Fall into Time (2013, Software)

=== Soundtrack albums ===
- Good Time (2017, Warp)
- Uncut Gems (2019, Warp)
- Marty Supreme (2025, A24 Music)

=== Miscellaneous ===
- Music for Reliquary House / In 1980 I Was a Blue Square (split LP with Rene Hell) (2012, NNA Tapes)

=== Remixes ===
- Sistol - "Funseeker (Oneohtrix Point Never's Rainbro Mix)" (2010)
- Gonjasufi - "She's Gone (Oneohtrix Point Never Remix)" (2010)
- Laurel Halo - "Metal Confection (Oneohtrix Point Never Edit)" (2010)
- Wild Beasts - "Two Dancers (ii) (Oneohtrix Point Never White Knights Remix)" (2010)
- Chateau Marmont - "One Hundred Realities (Oneohtrix Point Never Cybersex Remix)" (2011)
- Antony and the Johnsons - "Swanlights (OPN Edit)" (2011)
- Pariah - "Orpheus (Oneohtrix Point Never Subliminal Cops Edit)" (2011)
- Lindstrøm - "Call Me Anytime (Oneohtrix Point Never Remix)" (2012)
- Richard Youngs - "Rurtain (Oneohtrix Point Never Remix)" (2012)
- Nine Inch Nails - "Find My Way (Oneohtrix Point Never Remix)" (2013)
- Four Tet - "Evening Side (Oneohtrix Point Never Edit)" (2016)
- Michael Gordon & Mantra Percussion - "Timber (Oneohtrix Point Never Remix)" (2016)
- Ryuichi Sakamoto - "andata (Oneohtrix Point Never Remodel)" (2017)
- The Weeknd - "Save Your Tears (OPN Remix)" (2020)
- The Weeknd - "Dawn FM (OPN Remix)" (2022)

=== Production and mixing work ===
- ANOHNI – Hopelessness, 2016 (Co-production with Anohni and Hudson Mohawke)
- DJ Earl – Open Your Eyes, 2016 (Co-production, keyboards)
- ANOHNI – Paradise (EP), 2017 (Co-production with Anohni and Hudson Mohawke)
- FKA twigs – MAGDALENE, 2019 (Producer on "daybed")
- The Weeknd – After Hours, 2020 (Co-production, keyboards)
- The Weeknd – Dawn FM, 2022 (Co-production)
- Charli XCX – CRASH, 2022 (Co-production on "Every Rule" with A. G. Cook)
- Soccer Mommy – Sometimes, Forever, 2022
- The Weeknd – Hurry Up Tomorrow, 2025 (Co-production)

=== Video ===
- Memory Vague (2009, Root Strata)

== As Daniel Lopatin ==
=== Collaborations ===
- FRKWYS 7 (collaboration with David Borden, Laurel Halo, Sam Godin and James Ferraro) (2011, RVNG Intl.)
- Instrumental Tourist (collaboration with Tim Hecker) (2012, Software)

=== Film score ===
- The Bling Ring (2013)
- Partisan (2015)
- Uncut Gems (Original Motion Picture Soundtrack) (2019)
- Hurry Up Tomorrow (Original Motion Picture Score) (2025)
- Marty Supreme (Original Motion Picture Soundtrack) (2025)

=== Musical contributions ===
- Ducktails – The Flower Lane (2013) (Synthesizer)
- Real Estate – "Out of Tune" from Days (2011) (Synthesizer)
- Moses Sumney - Græ (2020) (Synthesizer, Additional Production)

=== Production and mixing work ===
- Harold Grosskopf – Re-Synthesist, 2011 (feature on "Trauma 2010")
- Clinic – Free Reign, 2012 (Mixing)
- Clinic – Free Reign II, 2013 (Mixing)
- Autre Ne Veut – Anxiety, 2013 (Additional Production, Keyboards)
- Ducktails – The Flower Lane, 2013 (Synthesizer)
- Okkyung Lee, Lasse Marhaug, C. Spencer Yeh – Wake Up Awesome, 2013 (Executive Producer – as Daniel Lopatin)

== As Chuck Person ==
=== Cassette ===
- Chuck Person's Eccojams Vol. 1 (as Chuck Person) (2010, The Curatorial Club)

=== Compilations ===
- A.D.D. Complete (2012, Software)

== As Dania Shapes ==
=== Studio albums ===
- Soundsystem Pastoral (2006, Naivsuper)
- Holograd (2008, Paper Cities)

== As a member of Ford & Lopatin/Games ==
=== Studio albums ===
- Channel Pressure (2011, Software)

=== Extended plays ===
- Everything Is Working (2010, Hippos in Tanks)
- That We Can Play (2010, Hippos in Tanks)

=== Mixtapes ===
- Spend the Night with... Games (2010)

== Other projects ==
=== As a member of Infinity Window ===
- Trans Fat (2008, Chocolate Monk)
- Artificial Midnight (2009, Arbor)

=== As a member of Skyramps ===
- Days of Thunder (2009, Wagon)

=== As a member of Total System Point Never ===
- Power in That Which Compels You (2008, Snapped in Half)

=== As a member of Astronaut ===
- Early Peril (2008, Insult)
- Sans Noise Suitcase (2008, Housecraft)

=== As a member of Guys Next Door ===
- "Behind the Wall" (2017, PC Music)
