= Blow the Wind: Pie Jesu =

Blow the Wind: Pie Jesu is a piece by Jocelyn Pook with vocals by Pook, Kathleen Ferrier and Melanie Pappenheim. Composed in 1994, it first appeared on the album The Best...Classical Album in the World...Ever!.

== Structure ==
The song starts out with a one-note line with children playing in the background. Ferrier then sings the line "Blow the wind, southerly". Then Pook says "Pie Jesu Domine". Then the line goes to segue into "Dona eis requiem" whereas Pappenheim sings faster "Dona eis requiem"s. Then Pook, who says "Domine", then "Pie Jesu". Then Pappenheim says faster "Pie Jesu Domine"s. It finally ends with Ferrier saying the line "Blow the wind, southerly" which echoes throughout.

The song consists of many sixteenth notes.

== Samples ==
Oneohtrix Point Never sampled "Blow the Wind: Pie Jesu" on "Age Of", the title track on his album Age Of (2018).
