= Commissions I =

EP compilation by Oneohtrix Point Never
- Released: April 19, 2014
- Recorded: 2012–13
- Genre: Electronic
- Length: 20:24
- Label: Warp
- Producer: Oneohtrix Point Never

Oneohtrix Point Never chronology
R Plus Seven (2013)	Commissions I (2014)	Commissions II (2015)

Singles from Wave 1
- 1. "Music for Steamed Rocks" Released: March 5, 2014

Commissions I is a compilation extended play by American electronic musician Daniel Lopatin, known by his stage name Oneohtrix Point Never. It was released as a limited 12" vinyl edition of 1,000 copies on Record Store Day 2014 by the English label Warp. It is a collection of three tracks Lopatin commissioned for art pieces, films and live performance events: "Music for Steamed Rocks", "Meet Your Creator", and "I Only Have Eyes for You". These commissions were mixed and engineered for the EP by Paul Corley and mastered by Valgeir Sigurðsson. The record was well received by music journalists, landing at number nine on a list of the best EPs of 2014 by Pretty Much Amazing.

== Commission listing ==
=== "Music for Steamed Rocks" ===
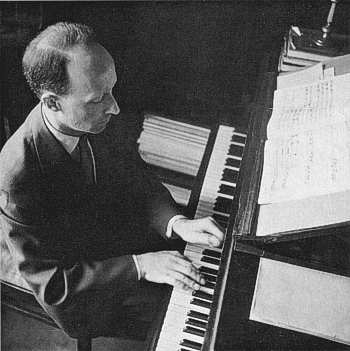
"Music for Steamed Rocks" is an interpretation of a piece by Polish composer Witold Lutosławski.

"Music for Steamed Rocks" (7:29) is an interpretation of Preludes by Polish composer Witold Lutosławski, produced by Lopatin for the concert Polish Icons, held at the 2013 Sacrum Profanum festival in Poland. Fact magazine critic Maya Kalev analyzed the track to have equal amounts of the style of Lopatin's releases on the labels Software and Editions Mego before 2012 and that of R Plus Seven (2013), which is one of the EP's several "markers that suggest Lopatin's shift from the texturally dense, emotionally stirring albums on Software and Editions Mego to the sheeny plastic surfaces and spacious compositions of R Plus Seven". The track was described by writer Joe Goggins as an abnormal take of hymnal sounds, and features elegant synthesized female voices, synthesized splash sounds, clean electronically-produced organs and strings, and low-quality samples and synthesizer drones a la Returnal (2010). Critic Ott Ilves writes that "Music for Steamed Rocks" consists of two movements, the first one consisting of voices that "playfully experiment with the harmony" and the second including strings and drone synthesizers.

=== "Meet Your Creator" ===
Lopatin composed "Meet Your Creator" (5:35) for the film Quadrotor (2012), showcased at the 2012 New Directors' Showcase event by agency Saatchi & Saatchi. Journalist Mark Keane compared it to tracks featured on Oneohtrix Point Never's album Rifts (2009). However, Kalev found it the most similar to "Chrome Country" and "Problem Areas", two cuts from R Plus Seven, because it involves "Lopatin zooming in on minute textural detail and solitary figures so that they're rendered in pin-sharp detail".

Described by Ilves as an "uplifting hymn", "Meet Your Creator" opens with spiraling 16-bit game–esque synths before it "gives way to positively subterranean bass", wrote Goggins. Goggins analyzed the first half of a track to not have a time signature, while the second half follows the same build-up structure of "Music for Steamed Rocks". Kalev writes the track consists of "melodic lines" circling around the song, drone synthesizer sounds, and choirs that "overlap and twist, building or subsiding quite unexpectedly". He wrote that "The palette Lopatin is working with is so limited, each element cushioned by so much space, that the precise points at which synth line, choir and pearly countermelody intersect are just as compelling as the timbres themselves." As Ilves analyzed, "the nervy and alien-sounding arpeggios, dark drone sounds, ecstatic synths and symphonic organs lead towards the culmination—the hopeful, harmonious and playful arpeggios, which seem to close the loop bringing the track back to the start—all in sync with the visual play before your eyes".

=== "I Only Have Eyes for You" ===
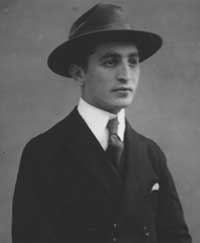
Harry Warren, the writer of "I Only Have Eyes for You"

The final track on Commissions I is what Kean described as an ominous and disordered cover of Harry Warren and Al Dubin's "I Only Have Eyes for You", (7:20) created for Doug Aitken's Happening installation event held in 2012 at the Hirshhorn Museum and Sculpture Garden. Label by Goggins to be the most "challenging" commission out of the three that are on Commissions I and having very little resemblance to the original recording of the song from the 1930s, the song consists of dark synthesizer drones and vocal snippets that pitch bend and constantly change in sustain throughout. As he analyzes, "it feels as if it should be soothing, but there's an implied foreboding to the instrumentation and something unshakeably disconcerting about the irregular, layered vocal that seems intended to throw you off". Kalev also called the song similar to R Plus Seven as well as having the "widescreen feel" of Rifts and Returnal. In fact, he highlighted the voices used on the track to be the part of the EP most similar to R Plus Seven.

== EP history ==
All of Lopatin's commissions that are featured on Commissions I were mixed and engineered for the EP by Paul Corley, who also worked with Lopatin on R Plus Seven, and mastered by Icelandic producer Valgeir Sigurðsson. Robert Beatty was responsible for the EP's cover art, which was featured on a column titled Record Sleeves of the Month by magazine Creative Review. With "Music for Steamed Rocks" released as a preview on March 5, 2014, Commissions I was released on Record Store Day on April 19, 2014 by the English independent label Warp for a limited 12" vinyl edition of 1,000 copies.

=== Critical reception ===
Professional ratings
Review scores
Source	Rating
The 405	8.5/10
Fact	3.5/5
The Line of Best Fit	7/10
The List	4/5 stars

Upon release, Commissions I garnered very favorable reviews from professional music critics. Keane wrote in his review for magazine The List, "It's art, it's collage, it's retro-futurist music for replicants and it sounds very nice." As Kalev summarized his opinion of the EP, "Commissions I is not just compelling in its own right; it also provides an invaluable insight into the interplay between the commissioned work and the conventionally released music of one of the past few years' most pivotal electronic artists." Goggins, reviewing for The Line of Best Fit, highlighted the commissioned tracks for their "distinctiveness", writing that they "work together in impressively cohesive fashion". Ilves, who wrote for The 405, called the EP a "thoughtful and conceptual collection of works worthy of praise". Commissions I was number one on Exclaim!'s list of "Top Releases to Hunt for This Record Store Day" and ranked number nine on a year-end list of the 14 best extended plays of 2014 by Pretty Much Amazing.

== Track listing ==
No.	Title	Length
1.	"Music for Steamed Rocks"	7:29
2.	"Meet Your Creator"	5:35
3.	"I Only Have Eyes for You"	7:20
Total length:		20:24
