= The Station (song) =

Single by Oneohtrix Point Never

from the album Age Of
- Released: 27 July 2018
- Genre: Electronic; experimental; art pop; folktronica
- Length: 4:19
- Label: Warp
- Songwriter: Daniel Lopatin
- Producer: Daniel Lopatin

Oneohtrix Point Never singles chronology
"We'll Take It" (2018)	"The Station" (2018)	"Love in the Time of Lexapro" (2018)

"The Station" is a song by American electronic producer and singer-songwriter Oneohtrix Point Never from his eighth studio album, Age Of.

== Background and composition ==
"The Station" was created from a demo that Daniel Lopatin wrote in 2016 while on tour with Anohni to assist with her performances of Hopelessness. On one night of the tour, American R&B singer Usher was present, and he appreciated a two-minute noise music interlude that Lopatin had composed for the tour, saying to him that it was 'what [he] wanted [his] next album to sound like'.

Intrigued by his appreciation and specifically his intent of collaborating, Lopatin wrote a demo in a London hotel room titled "dejavu" with a right-hand topline melody for Usher to sing to. However, the collaboration fell through, apparently because Usher was not impressed with the demo, and Lopatin later returned to the demo in 2018 to work on it and furthermore sing on it, renaming it to "The Station" and enlisting his friend Shaun Trujillo to write lyrics (as he is credited with multiple other songs on Age Of).

The song is built on a downsampled/low quality bass riff (edited from the original "dejavu" demo) that writers have compared to Justin Chancellor's riff in Tool's "Schism".

== Music video ==
The two characters face each other

The music video for "The Station", directed by American illustrator and animator Daylen Seu, was released on July 23, 2018. It depicts two humanoid characters confronting each other in a dark and stylized cavernous pit. A lavender-colored figure, chained at the neck, makes their way to the other figure, who is rendered using an emboss filter and stuck in a crack in the cave wall. They pull the embossed figure towards them, dragging into their back with their nails and leaving deep grooves in the embossed figure's flesh, who screams. Wounds appear in the cave walls, black drops of fluid dripping out into a large mouth in the cave floor. The lavender figure's chain is shown to be broken, lying across the floor. The embossed figure is now chained at the neck. This chain pulls upward and becomes animalistic in appearance, twisting and growing eyes. Sharp, embossed teeth enclose the picture. Four images are framed surrounding an icon of an eye: the lavender figure loses grip between inflating walls of the cave, their body distorts and breaks apart, the eyes on the chains cry black tears, and the tears splatter onto the face of the lavender figure. The eye flashes rapidly before fading away, leaving an image of broken chains embedded in an organic-looking rock formation behind. The picture pans upward to a broken chain which dangles just into the pit. The narrative is unclear, but it can be deduced that the lavender figure was lowered into the pit by this chain, which became broken. Characteristics of the embossed figure are shared by the cave itself, which implies the figure is an embodiment of the cave. The embossed figure's assumption of the chain, which then pulls upwards, suggests that they intended to escape the cave. However, neither figure is present when the video pans to outside the pit, which implies neither of them escaped.

== Track listing ==
All tracks are written by Daniel Lopatin.

No.	Title	Length
1.	"The Station"	4:19
2.	"Monody"	4:15
3.	"Blow by Blow"	5:28
4.	"Trance 1"	3:53
