= Chuck Person's Eccojams Vol. 1 =

2010 album by Daniel Lopatin

Studio album by Chuck Person
- Released: August 8, 2010
- Recorded: 2004 – 2009
- Genres: Eccojams; vaporwave; chopped and screwed; plunderphonics
- Length: 52:07 (Digital); 55:55 (Cassette)
- Label: The Curatorial Club

Daniel Lopatin chronology
Returnal (2010)	Chuck Person's Eccojams Vol. 1 (2010)	Replica (2011)

Chuck Person's Eccojams Vol. 1 is a 2010 album of remixes by American electronic musician Daniel Lopatin under the pseudonym Chuck Person. Its tracks consist of chopped and looped samples of various songs—including popular songs from the 1980s and 1990s—processed with effects such as delay, reverb, and pitch shifting; the results highlight mournful or existential moments from the sources. The album led to the emergence of a style known as "eccojams", which later influenced the internet microgenre vaporwave and came to be regarded as one of its early progenitors.

Prior to Eccojams Vol. 1's release, Lopatin posted a series of videos that he called "eccojams" to a YouTube channel named "sunsetcorp". The album was released under the label The Curatorial Club in August 2010 on 100 cassette tapes. By the time an official remastered version was released for digital download in November 2016, recognition for Eccojams Vol. 1 had grown, with the original tapes selling on Discogs at three-digit prices.

== Background and release ==
Prior to the release of Chuck Person's Eccojams Vol. 1, Daniel Lopatin ran the YouTube channel "sunsetcorp", where, beginning in 2009, Lopatin would upload music videos for tracks that he called "eccojams". (Note: Music critic Simon Reynolds spelled it "echo jams". Later sources have used the original spelling.) These were collages of slowed-down looped samples of 1980s and 1990s popular songs—or original pieces of electronic music—and looped video clips taken from YouTube; many of them were initially created at his office job in the free audio editing program GoldWave, between 2004 and 2008. "Nobody Here" combines a looped sample from Chris de Burgh's "The Lady in Red" with a vintage computer-animated graphic called "Rainbow Road". Other examples include Fleetwood Mac's "Only Over You" for "Angel" and Roger Troutman's "Emotions" for "End Of Life Entertainment Scenario #1". Some of these eccojams were initially released as part of the 2009 audiovisual project Memory Vague under Lopatin's alias Oneohtrix Point Never.

Eccojams Vol. 1 was an elaboration of that technique. A limited run of 100 cassette tapes was released under the label The Curatorial Club on August 8, 2010. Its artwork incorporates fragments of the cover art for the 1992 video game Ecco the Dolphin such as "a distorted view of a rocky shoreline and a pixelated shark." Lopatin released an official remaster for digital download from his website in November 2016 that was eventually removed.

== Composition ==
Chuck Person – "A1"
An example of Lopatin pitch-shifting and distorting 1980s pop music; the song "A1" remixes "Africa" by American rock band Toto.

Chuck Person's Eccojams Vol. 1 has been described as plunderphonics, chopped and screwed, eccojams, and vaporwave. The tone has been described as "dystopian", "unnerving, often mournful", "vast and mysterious", and "somber-yet-tropical". The songs consist of looped samples of popular songs from the 1980s and 1990s distorted by effects such as delay, reverb, and pitch shifting, a technique derived from DJ Screw's chopped and screwed technique and likened to a "candy-coloured variation" of William Basinski's The Disintegration Loops. Most of the lyrics isolated in these loops are lyrics which differ from "overall tone and sentiment" of the original songs and often express negative feelings. An example would be "B4", which isolates the lyric "There's nobody here" from "The Lady in Red" to convey existentialism, which differs from the romantic tone of the original song.

"A1", which stretches and loops the lyric "Hurry boy, she's waiting there for you" from Toto's "Africa", serves as the introduction. "A2" uses a phaser effect on "Only Over You". "A3" is a pitched-down looped sample of JoJo's "Too Little Too Late", creating "dense, compressed, overdubbed harmonies". "A4" samples a lyric from Michael Jackson's "Morphine" expressing horror at someone taking Demerol. The lyric is warped, creating the impression that the listener is intoxicated, before flanging is applied. "A5", which samples a song by the Byrds, is described by Spectrum Culture as "a creepy little skit so blurred in effects as to be unrecognizable". "A6" is taken from Janet Jackson's "Lonely". "A7" is taken from Aphrodite's Child's "The Four Horsemen", "injecting a bit of apocalyptic dread" from the song's themes and uncertain melody. "A8", after an R&B loop, ends with a crescendo of digital noise, akin to a blizzard. "B1" has a bleak tone, similar to a twisted dream, before transitioning to an uplifting loop of Kate Bush's voice from "Don't Give Up". "B2" is a "drunken, off-key" and slowed-down loop of "Gypsy". "B5" samples 2Pac's "Me Against the World". The final song, "B7", is a loop of "Woman in Chains" by Tears for Fears, that has a shimmering effect "approaching and receding", eventually "overtak[ing] the words" before the song fades out.

== Reception and legacy ==
Professional ratings
Review scores
Source	Rating
Pitchfork	8.6/10
Spectrum Culture	4.25/5 stars
Sputnikmusic	5.0/5

Though Chuck Person's Eccojams Vol. 1 was released "with little fanfare", the videos Lopatin posted on YouTube became popular, with "Nobody Here" amassing 30,000 views over several months. Music critic Simon Reynolds highlighted the videos' "conceptual framework" as "relat[ing] to cultural memory and the buried utopianism within capitalist commodities, especially those related to consumer technology in the computing and audio/video entertainment area". Anthony Fantano mentioned Eccojams Vol. 1 in his 2012 review of Macintosh Plus's Floral Shoppe, saying he found Eccojams Vol. 1 to be "more bold with its editing and its looping and its stretching" of music samples than Floral Shoppe.

According to Tiny Mix Tapes, Eccojams Vol. 1 would lead to Lopatin's 2011 Oneohtrix Point Never album Replica. In 2012, Lopatin released a box set of four 7-inch singles titled Chuck Persons A.D.D., consisting of 30 eccojams. Each disc is designed to have grooves that would make them play infinitely. On the 2015 Oneohtrix Point Never album Garden of Delete, the song "EccojamC1" was included as a tribute to Eccojams Vol. 1. In a 2013 Reddit Ask Me Anything (AMA), when inquired about a follow-up album to Eccojams Vol. 1, Lopatin revealed that he had many eccojams in a "cryotank set to defrost in the distant future."

Retrospectively, Eccojams Vol. 1 is widely considered influential in vaporwave, a music genre characterized by slowed-down samples from 1980s and 1990s music. Released before vaporwave's 2012 rise in popularity, the album would serve as a template for artists such as Vektroid and Mediafired to produce what would become vaporwave music. (Note: Attributed to multiple sources.) According to Stereogum's Miles Bowe, vaporwave artists "mash the chopped and screwed plunderphonics of Dan Lopatin ... with the nihilistic easy-listening of James Ferraro's Muzak-hellscapes on Far Side Virtual". In 2013, the music blog Girls Blood described Eccojams Vol. 1, along with Far Side Virtual and Skeleton's Holograms, as "Proto Vaporwave" in a post about "Vaporwave Essentials". Regarding the influx of vaporwave producers that came after Eccojams Vol. 1, Lopatin said in a 2017 AMA:

Well—the entire point of Eccojams was that it was a DIY practice that didn't involve any specialized music tech knowledge and for me it was a direct way of dealing with audio in a mutable, philosophical way that had very little to do with music and everything to do with feelings and I'm happy to see that it actually turned out to be true, that people make the stuff and find connection and meaning through that practice is all I could ever hope for. It's folk music now.

Originally "relatively unacknowledged", by the time of the 2016 re-release, original copies of Eccojams Vol. 1 were highly valued, selling on Discogs for a median cost of US$250 and as high as $400. Kirk Bowman of Sputnikmusic rated Eccojams Vol. 1 highly for its poignancy and found it to be a rare example of a repetitive album that he wanted to listen to repeatedly. Spectrum Culture lauded the album for "feel[ing] so vast and mysterious". Marvin Lin of Tiny Mix Tapes described the album as "plundering the depths of pop music and uncovering short musical segments or particularly existential lyrical moments" to create "a simple yet wholly ecstatic listening experience". Fact listed "A3" as among the best songs by Lopatin, Fantano ranked Eccojams Vol. 1 at number 153 on his list of best albums of the 2010s, and Tiny Mix Tapes named Eccojams Vol. 1 the top album of the 2010s; Pat Beane said that was because, "we at Tiny Mix Tapes couldn't get enough of music. And Eccojams, of music, begat more music". In 2020, the 33⅓ series published a book of essays on underrated albums titled The 33 1/3 B-Sides, which included a Lin piece on Eccojams Vol. 1. In 2025, Pitchfork reviewed the album stating, "[Lopatin] was at the vanguard of the American noise scene in the hazy years when it retreated from feedback-soaked harshness into an unkanny kosmische. Alongside artists like Emeralds, Yellow Swans, Skaters, and Carlos Giffoni, noise music was starting to sound less like The Texas Chain Saw Massacre and more like Tarkovsky's Stalker—and Lopatin was quietly training to become the house DJ for the 'Zone'."

== Track listing ==
Adapted from the original cassette release as well as track titles lifted from Collected Echoes (2004-2008) (2015) by Daniel Lopatin.

Chuck Person's Eccojams Vol. 1 track listing
No.	Title	Sample(s)	Length
1.	"A1" (alternatively known as "She's Waiting")	"Africa" by Toto	2:36
2.	"A2" (alternatively known as "Angel")	"Only Over You" by Fleetwood Mac	3:48
3.	"A3" (alternatively known as "Be Real/Dreams")	"Too Little Too Late" by JoJo; "Castles in the Sky" by Ian Van Dahl feat. Marsha	6:04
4.	"A4" (alternatively known as "Demerol")	"Morphine" by Michael Jackson	1:55
5.	"A5" (alternatively known as "The Door")	"Everybody's Been Burned" by The Byrds	2:51
6.	"A6" (alternatively known as "Alone")	"Lonely" by Janet Jackson	2:46
7.	"A7" (alternatively known as "Horsemen")	"The Four Horsemen" by Aphrodite's Child	2:17
8.	"A8" (alternatively known as "Make You Mine/Information")	"My Love Is Waiting" by Marvin Gaye; "Hearsay" by Alexander O'Neal	4:46
9.	"B1" (alternatively known as "Letters/Never Been Easy")	"Sweet Little Mystery" by John Martyn; "Don't Give Up" by Peter Gabriel and Kate Bush	4:33
10.	"B2" (alternatively known as "Let It Go/Lightning Strikes")	"Love T.K.O." by Teddy Pendergrass; "Gypsy" by Fleetwood Mac	4:36
11.	"B3" (alternatively known as "One More Year/No Compromise")	"Baker Street" by Gerry Rafferty; "Separate Lives" by Phil Collins and Marilyn Martin	4:16
12.	"B4" (alternatively known as "Nobody Here")	"The Lady in Red" by Chris de Burgh	2:10
13.	"B5" (alternatively known as "World")	"Me Against the World" by 2Pac	2:51
14.	"B6" (alternatively known as "Silence")	"These Dreams" by Heart	2:23
15.	"B7" (alternatively known as "SOS/Womack Circuit/Woman in Chains")	"Letter from Spain" by Electric Light Orchestra; "Catch and Don't Look Back" by Womack & Womack; "Woman in Chains" by Tears for Fears	4:08
Total length:			52:07

== Release history ==
Release formats for Chuck Person's Eccojams Vol. 1
Date	Label	Format	Catalog number	Ref.
August 8, 2010	The Curatorial Club	Cassette	TCC011	
November 2016	Self-released	Digital download	N/A	

== Works cited ==
- Back, Anders (December 10, 2020). "The Reproduction". In Schulze, Holger (ed.). The Bloomsbury Handbook of the Anthropology of Sound. Bloomsbury Publishing. pp. 385–398. ISBN 978-1-5013-3541-9.
- Lin, Marvin (September 5, 2019). "Daniel Lopatin's Chuck Person's Eccojams Vol. 1 (2010)". In Stockton, Will; Gilson, D. (eds.). The 33 1/3 B-Sides. Bloomsbury Publishing. pp. 168–172. ISBN 978-1-5013-4242-4.
- Reynolds, Simon (June 2011). "Total Recall: Music and Memory in the Time of YouTube". Retromania: Pop Culture's Addiction to Its Own Past. Faber and Faber Ltd. pp. 55–85. ISBN 978-0-571-23208-6.
- Trainer, Adam (March 7, 2016). "From Hypnagogia to Distroid: Postironic Musical Renderings of Personal Memory". In Whiteley, Shelia; Rambarran, Shara (eds.). The Oxford Handbook of Music and Virtuality. Oxford University Press. pp. 409–427. ISBN 978-0-19-932128-5.
- Whelan, Andrew (May 2, 2020). ""Do You Have a Moment to Talk About Vaporwave?" Technology, Memory, and Critique in the Writing on an Online Music Scene". In Tofalvy, Tamas; Barna, Emília (eds.). Popular Music, Technology, and the Changing Media Ecosystem: From Cassettes to Stream. Pop Music, Culture and Identity. Springer International Publishing. pp. 185–200. doi:10.1007/978-3-030-44659-8_11. ISBN 978-3-0304-4659-8. S2CID 219047647.
