= Uncut Gems (soundtrack) =

Soundtrack album by Daniel Lopatin
- Released: December 13, 2019
- Studio: Electric Garden, Brooklyn, NY; Gaia Studios, Brooklyn, NY
- Genre: Electronica
- Length: 51:56
- Label: Warp
- Producer: Daniel Lopatin

Daniel Lopatin chronology
Age Of (2018)	Uncut Gems (2019)	Magic Oneohtrix Point Never (2020)

Uncut Gems is a soundtrack album by electronic musician Daniel Lopatin, containing the original score for the Safdie brothers' 2019 film Uncut Gems. It was released via Warp on December 13, 2019. It received positive reviews from critics. It peaked at number 44 on the UK Soundtrack Albums Chart.

== Background ==
Film co-director Josh Safdie worked closely with Lopatin on the score, which began with a "Frankenstein" score using library and new-age music before Lopatin began sketching out compositions. Safdie described the soundtrack as "a medicinal new-age soul of a film," in contrast to the "pulse" of their previous collaboration Good Time. Lopatin described it as "more beautiful, ethereal, it's more orchestral, it's goofier."

The "cosmically synthesized" score uses a Moog One synthesizer, and draws inspiration from artists such as Isao Tomita, Tangerine Dream and Vangelis, as well as the 1970s-80s new-age duo Emerald Web. Lopatin and Safdie used Moog's synthesizer library and Omnisphere to search for "earthy melancholic sounds that had a cosmic twist," as well as saxophone and a choir. The track "Fuck You, Howard" is a reinterpretation of Haydn's Symphony No. 88, while "Windows" is an homage to "Kaneda's theme" from the anime film Akira.

== Critical reception ==
Professional ratings
Aggregate scores
Source	Rating
Metacritic	74/100
Review scores
Source	Rating
Exclaim!	7/10
The Guardian	4/5 stars
The Line of Best Fit	9/10
Mojo	3/5 stars
Pitchfork	7.4/10
Uncut	4/5 stars

At Metacritic, the album received an average score of 74 out of 100, based on 6 mainstream critical reviews, indicating "generally favorable reviews".

Thomas Johnson of The Line of Best Fit called the album "further proof Lopatin will be held in the same esteem as Ennio Morricone, John Carpenter, Vangelis and so on." He stated that the album is "filled with heartfelt synth lines, gorgeous revolving, spacey sequences and emotive samples" in contrast to his narrower score for Good Time. Ben Beaumont-Thomas of The Guardian wrote that "lesser composers try to merely mirror the action on screen and intensify it, boringly magnifying your emotions." He added, "Lopatin is showing how contradictory, confusing and vital our dumb human impulses are." Mina Tavakoli of Pitchfork stated that the score "has a large blast radius in the movie, itself a funny character in an ensemble of unintentionally funny characters." Matthew Clark of Exclaim! wrote: "Not only does this collection of music have a cinematic quality that lends it its soundtrack purpose, it also stands alone as an engaging set of songs and motifs on their own."

== Track listing ==
All tracks are written by Daniel Lopatin.

No.	Title	Length
1.	"The Ballad of Howie Bling"	8:26
2.	"Pure Elation"	1:01
3.	"Followed"	1:32
4.	"The Bet Hits"	2:51
5.	"High Life"	1:00
6.	"No Vacation"	0:54
7.	"School Play"	6:16
8.	"Fuck You Howard"	2:42
9.	"Smoothie"	1:10
10.	"Back to Roslyn"	2:02
11.	"The Fountain"	2:21
12.	"Powerade"	0:52
13.	"Windows"	5:06
14.	"Buzz Me Out"	2:49
15.	"The Blade"	1:32
16.	"Mohegan Suite"	4:42
17.	"Uncut Gems"	6:40

== Personnel ==
Credits adapted from liner notes. Some tracks are intercut with dialogue from the film.

- Daniel Lopatin – performance, production
- Conor Abbott Brown – choral production, arrangement
- Maxwell J. McKee – vocals (1, 8, 16), arrangement
- Rob Geldelian – track engineering, edit engineering
- Matt Cohn – engineering, mixing
- Ian Lavely – engineering assistance, mixing assistance
- Jaclyn Sanchez – additional engineering
- Nolan Theis – additional engineering
- Mario Castro – flute (1, 2, 4, 5, 9, 10), saxophone (1, 2, 4, 5, 9, 10)
- Josh Safdie – snake bites (1, 6, 16, 17)
- Emily Schubert – vocals (1, 7, 14)
- Maureen Bailey – vocals (1, 8, 16)
- John Boggs – vocals (1, 8, 16)
- Brian Du Fresne – vocals (1, 8, 16)
- Chelsea Kendall – vocals (1, 8, 16)
- Claire McCahan – vocals (1, 8, 16)
- Rebecca Myers – vocals (1, 8, 16)
- Daniel Parks – vocals (1, 8, 16)
- Eli Keszler – drums (1, 13), percussion (1, 13)
- Adam Sandler – voice (3, 6, 7, 12)
- Ronnie Greenberg – voice (3)
- Marshall Greenberg – voice (3)
- Idina Menzel – voice (6, 7)
- Keren Shemel – voice (6)
- Aren Topian – voice (6)
- Gatekeeper – synthesizer (7, 16)
- Sebastian Bear-McClard – vocals (11, 16)
- Julia Fox – voice (12)
- Kevin Garnett – voice (12)
- Patricia Sullivan Fourstar – mastering
- Caleb Halter – design
- Inez and Vinoodh – cover photography

== Charts ==
Chart	Peak position
UK Soundtrack Albums (OCC)	44
