= Good Time (soundtrack) =

Good Time (Original Motion Picture Soundtrack)

Soundtrack album by Oneohtrix Point Never
- Released: August 10, 2017
- Genre: Electronica
- Length: 46:02
- Label: Warp
- Producer: Daniel Lopatin

Oneohtrix Point Never chronology
| Garden of Delete (2015) | Good Time (Original Motion Picture Soundtrack) (2017) | Age Of (2018) |

Good Time (Original Motion Picture Soundtrack) is a soundtrack album by American electronic musician Oneohtrix Point Never, containing the score for the Safdie brothers' 2017 film Good Time. It was released on August 10, 2017 via Warp Records.

The soundtrack received positive reviews from critics, and won the Soundtrack Award at the 2017 Cannes Film Festival. It includes a collaboration with singer Iggy Pop.

== Background ==
Lopatin had previously contributed scoring work to Sofia Coppola's 2013 film The Bling Ring (in collaboration with Brian Reitzell) and Ariel Kleiman's 2015 film Partisan. He became interested in working with the Safdie brothers when they sent him a mood board that featured images from "completely unrelated stuff, like a picture of SpongeBob and then weird heist imagery." The Safdie brothers were previously fans of the Oneohtrix Point Never track "Behind the Bank." Josh Safdie explained that "I had always imagined Dan’s work, especially his earlier work, as soundtracks to movies that never existed."

During recording, the brothers invoked the work of German electronic group Tangerine Dream but also encouraged Lopatin to experiment and make the music "more fucked up," including influences from prog rock, which helped him to avoid "mimetically revert[ing] to Edgar Froese—it's just in my DNA." He reached out to Iggy Pop to record for the movie's ending after his manager told him to "think big." Lopatin also described the recording as an update of his earlier synthesizer-based work, stating that "I wanted to make something that sounded like Good Time back when I was doing the early stuff, but I didn’t quite know how yet." The Safdie brothers characterized it as if "OPN took everything he learned on R Plus Seven, Replica, Garden of Delete and did a sequel to Rifts."

== Critical reception ==
Professional ratings
Aggregate scores
| Source | Rating |
|---|---|
| Metacritic | 79/100 |
Review scores
| Source | Rating |
| AllMusic | 4/5 stars |
| The A.V. Club | B+ |
| Drowned in Sound | 8/10 |
| Exclaim! | 8/10 |
| The Guardian | 4/5 stars |
| The Line of Best Fit | 8.5/10 |
| Pitchfork | 7.7/10 |
| Q | 3/5 stars |

Following the film's premier at Cannes Film Festival, Lopatin's score won the festival's Soundtrack Award. It was later released as an album via Warp Records. The album has received generally positive reviews from critics, with an aggregate score of 79 out of 100 at Metacritic.

Ashley Hampson of Exclaim! wrote that "there's no doubt Good Time OST absolutely sounds like a movie score, but every single track here stands on its own, providing an intensely emotional punch to the gut." Sean O'Neal of The A.V. Club called it "a masterful job of homage, and—as with Thief and Drive before it—all those pulsating synths and cavernous low tones give the film much of its swagger." Q stated that "its tight-wound electronica is perfect for anyone wanting a visual-free sensation of mounting suspense in the comfort of their own home." Ben Beaumont-Thomas of The Guardian noted the inspiration of composers such as John Carpenter, Brad Fiedel, and Vangelis but stated that "the sheer density and erratic energy is all Lopatin’s own." He described Iggy Pop's guest appearance as one of the singer's "great late-period triumphs."

== The Pure and the Damned video ==
A video for the track "The Pure and the Damned" was released, directed by the Safdie brothers and featuring Robert Pattinson and Benny Safdie reprising their roles from the movie. It seemingly depicts a what if scenario of Connie and Nick fulfilling their desire to leave New York. The two are shown to be restless in their farm home as Connie brandishes a sword and heads outside to confront a strange hyena-wolf like creature. The two of them stare at one another, but neither makes the effort to attack. All the while, a CG-animated Iggy Pop sings and flails in front of their house.

== Track listing ==
All tracks written by Daniel Lopatin. "The Pure and the Damned" co-written by Iggy Pop.

| No. | Title | Length |
|---|---|---|
| 1. | "Good Time" | 6:52 |
| 2. | "Bail Bonds" | 2:24 |
| 3. | "6th Floor" | 1:16 |
| 4. | "Hospital Escape / Access-A-Ride" | 4:11 |
| 5. | "Ray Wakes Up" | 3:51 |
| 6. | "Entry to White Castle" | 2:25 |
| 7. | "Flashback" | 3:24 |
| 8. | "Adventurers" | 1:00 |
| 9. | "Romance Apocalypse" | 2:13 |
| 10. | "The Acid Hits" | 3:44 |
| 11. | "Leaving the Park" | 5:13 |
| 12. | "Connie" | 5:04 |
| 13. | "The Pure and the Damned" (featuring Iggy Pop) | 4:29 |

== Personnel ==
- Daniel Lopatin – writing, production, mixing
- Gabriel Schuman – mixing, engineer
- Dave Kutch – mastering
- Caleb Halter – design
- Jason Harvey – Illustration
