= Jon Rafman =

Canadian artist, filmmaker, and essayist

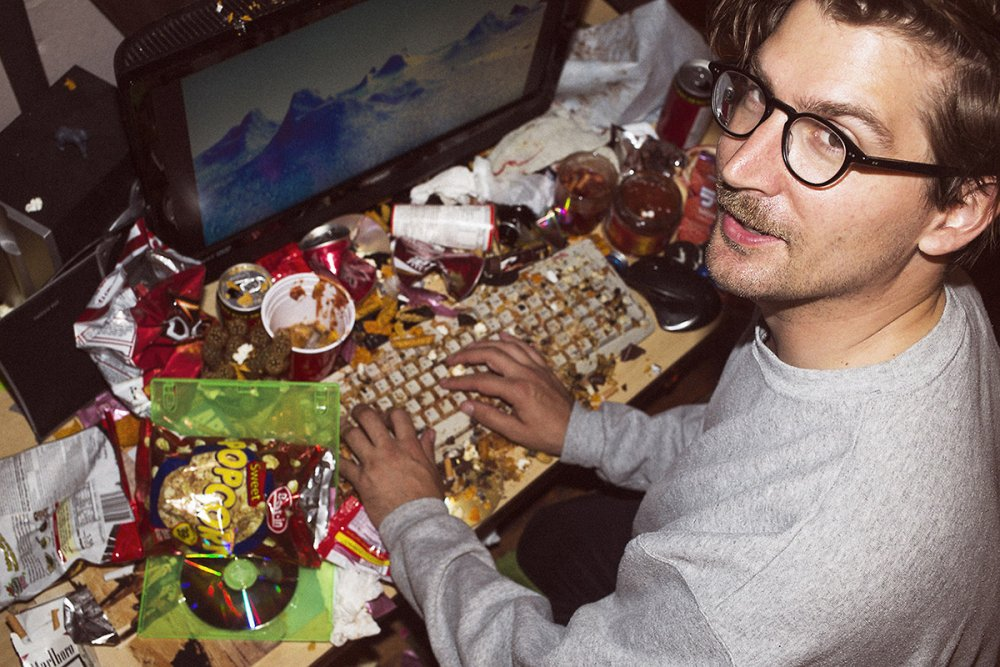
Jon Rafman portrait, 2018

Jon Rafman (born 1981) is a Canadian artist, filmmaker, and essayist. His work centers around the emotional, social and existential impact of technology on contemporary life. His artwork has gained international attention and was exhibited in 2015 at Musée d'art contemporain de Montréal (Montreal) and Stedelijk Museum Amsterdam. He is widely known for exhibiting found images from Google Street View in his online artwork 9-Eyes (2009-ongoing).

== Biography ==
Rafman was born in Montreal, Canada. He holds an M.F.A. from The School of the Art Institute of Chicago and a B.A. in Philosophy and Literature from McGill University. He lives in Montreal.

== Work ==
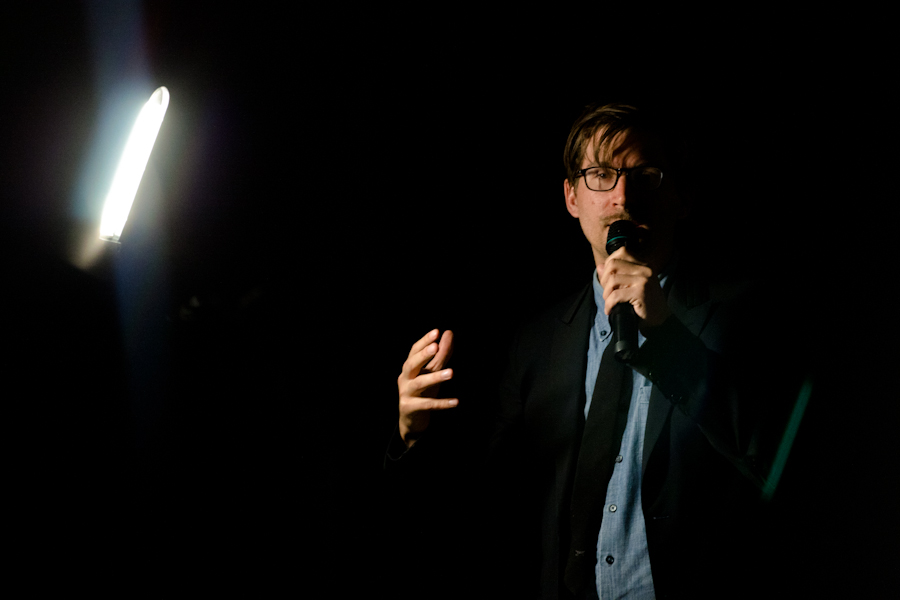
Rafman giving a lecture in Moscow, 2012

Rafman's work focuses on technology and digital media, often using narrative to emphasize the ways in which they connect users back to society and history. Much of his work focuses on melancholy in modern social interactions, communities and virtual realities (primarily Google Earth, Google Street View and Second Life), while still bringing light to the beauty of them in a manner sometimes inspired by Romanticism. His videos and art utilize personal moments intended to reveal how pop culture ephemera and subcultures shape individual desires, and will often define those individuals in return.

=== Kool-Aid Man in Second Life ===
Rafman's Kool-Aid Man in Second Life project consists of films and participatory tours around the virtual universe of Second Life, which is hosted by his avatar, a 3D render of the Kool-Aid Man. Rafman conducted these tours live, inviting audience members to take part in the exploration of the virtual world as he guided and contextualized the experience Kool-Aid Man in Second life is a quasi-ethnographic tour of the wildly varied fantasies invented and pursued by denizens of the web's murkier corners. Rafman describes this project as an exploration of new communities that formed as the internet became a ubiquitous aspect of modern life.

=== Nine Eyes of Google Street View ===
In 2008, Rafman started Nine Eyes of Google Street View, a long-term archival photo project which uses screenshots of Google Street View images as its source. These images from across the world are arranged in a massive database and published in books, on blogs and as prints for his various exhibitions. Rafman later began to keep an ongoing Tumblr blog where he would post his Google Street View images.

=== Dream Journal ===
In 2016, Rafman's animated feature-length film Dream Journal premiered at the Sprüth Magers gallery in Berlin. Inspired by Rafman's habit of recording and animating his dreams, the film through a series of dream episodes explores the effects that technology and the internet have on the human psyche. Rafman has called the process of working on the film a form of "worldbuilding" with the desire to create a Boschian-like vision of our current hellscape. A roundtable discussion accompanying a 24 hr screening of Dreamjournal was hosted by Caesura Magazine featuring Vanessa Place, Victoria Campbell, Mohammad Salemy, Athina Karatzogianni, Andrew Fremont-Smith, Bret Schneider, Marco Aurelio Torres and Grant Tyler moderated by Laurie Rojas.

=== cloudyheart ===
In 2024, Jon Rafman introduced cloudyheart, one of the first AI-driven musical artist in history. Rafman revealed this project on X (formerly Twitter).

== Career ==
Jon Rafman's oeuvre has been situated within the Post-Internet art movement. He has risen to acclaim with his project Nine Eyes of Google Street View, which developed a distinctly post-internet approach to photography. His work has been included in numerous prestigious international biennials, including the 58th Venice Biennale, 13th Lyon Biennale, 9th Berlin Biennale, and Manifesta 11.

In September 2013, Rafman collaborated with Brooklyn-based experimental musician Daniel Lopatin, better known by his stage name Oneohtrix Point Never, on a music video for "Still Life" to accompany the release of R Plus Seven on Warp Records. The two later collaborated to create a two-part music video for "Sticky Drama", from Lopatin's 2015 album Garden of Delete.

In 2015, the City of Montreal and the Contemporary Art Galleries Association awarded Rafman the Prix-Pierre-Ayot prize for emerging artists. Rafman represented Quebec twice as a finalist in the competition for the 2015 and 2018 Sobey Art Award. In 2018, Parisian fashion house Balenciaga commissioned Rafman to create an immersive LED tunnel for their Spring-Summer 2019 show. Rafman is represented by art galleries Sprüth Magers (Berlin, Los Angeles, London) and Seventeen (London).

Among public collections holding examples of his work are The Museum of Modern Art in New York City, the Stedelijk Museum in Amsterdam, the MAXXI in Rome, National Gallery of Canada in Ottawa, Moderna Museet in Stockholm, and others.

In July 2020, Rafman was accused by three women of alleged sexual misconduct in posts made to the Instagram account @surviving_the_artworld. These accusations were reported by the Montreal Gazette. Jon Rafman sued the Gazette and journalist T’cha Dunlevy for defamation. Under a settlement the stories were removed from the site, with the Gazette stating that they had not given "equal time or space to Mr. Rafman to refute the claims against which he had evidence". At the time, the Hirshhorn Museum suspended a planned Rafman exhibit and his Montreal gallery broke off its relationship with him.

In February 2022, Jon Rafman's film Punctured Sky (2021) won the KNF (Circle of Dutch Film Journalists) prize at the International Film Festival Rotterdam (IFFR).

In January 2023, rapper Lil Yachty released his critically acclaimed album Let's Start Here with Rafman's artwork on the cover. In July 2023, Rafman contributed artwork to rapper Travis Scott's highly anticipated album, Utopia. In January 2024, Kanye West posted a trailer to Instagram with the caption "VULTURES TRAILER BY JON RAFMAN" for his collaborative album with Ty Dolla Sign, Vultures.

In February 2024, Ye acknowledged that his apology to the Jewish community for his antisemitic remarks was inspired by Rafman in a tweet: "DOV CHARNEY JONAH HILL AND JON RAFMAN ARE 3 PEOPLE WHO INSPIRED MY APOLOGY".

== Exhibitions ==
=== Solo exhibitions ===
- You Are Standing in an Open Field, Zach Feuer Gallery New York, September 2013
- A Man Digging, Seventeen Gallery, London, May 2013
- Annals of Time Lost, Future Gallery, Berlin, April 2013
- Jon Rafman, Musée d'art contemporain de Montréal, Montréal, June 2015
- I have ten thousand compound eyes and each is named suffering, Stedelijk Museum, Amsterdam, May 2016
- Jon Rafman, Carl Kostyál, Stockholm, Sweden, 2016
- Il Viaggiatore Mentale, Palazzina dei Giardini, Modena, September 2018
- Dream Journal, Oval Office, Bochum, September 2021
- You, the World, and I, La Casa Encendida, Madrid, October 2021
- Arbiter of Worlds, Ordet, Milan, February 2022
- Egregores and Grimoires, Schinkel Pavillion, Berlin, September 2022
- Counterfit Poast, Sprueth Magers, Berlin, September 2022
- Minor Daemon, 180 Strand, London, January 2023
- 𝐸𝒷𝓇𝒶𝒽 𝒦'𝒹𝒶𝒷𝓇𝒾, Sprueth Magers, London, January 2023
- ¡ʎʇıuɐɯnH ǝɥʇ 'ɥO Whangārei Art Museum, Whangārei, December-March 2024-2025
- Report a Concern, Louisiana Museum of Modern Art, Humlebæk, October 2025-January 2026

MainStreamt Media K 21 Düsseldorf 30. 5. - 27.9.2026 https://www.myheimat.de/duesseldorf/c-kultur/k-21-jon-rafman_a3614539

=== Group exhibitions ===
- Museum of Contemporary Art of Rome, 2010
- Free, New Museum, New York, 2010
- New Jpegs, Johan Berggren Gallery in Malmo, Sweden, 2011
- The Saatchi Gallery, 2012
- Palais de Tokyo, 2012
- Museum of Contemporary Canadian Art, 2012
- Speculations on Anonymous Materials, The Fridericianum, Kassel, 2013
- Summer Show, Carl Kostyál, Stockholm, Sweden, 2017
- Stockholm Dinner Sessions, Carl Kostyál, Stockholm, Sweden, 2019
- Malmö Sessions, Carl Kostyál, Malmö, Sweden, 2019
- Rencontres d'Arles
- Ticket to the Future, Kunstmuseum Bonn, Bonn, 2021
- What Wonderful World, MAXXI museum, Rome, 2022

== Publications with contributions by Rafman ==
- Communicating the Archive: Physical Migration. Regional State Archives in Gothenburg. Rafman's work was included, as was an essay by Sandra Rafman, on the archival impulses of Rafman's work.
