= Again (Oneohtrix Point Never album) =

Studio album by Oneohtrix Point Never
- Released: September 29, 2023
- Genres: Experimental; electronic
- Length: 56:54
- Label: Warp
- Producers: Daniel Lopatin; Nathan Salon

Oneohtrix Point Never chronology
Magic Oneohtrix Point Never (2020)	Again (2023)	Tranquilizer (2025)

Singles from Again
- 1. "A Barely Lit Path" Released: August 29, 2023; 2. "Nightmare Paint" Released: December 14, 2023

Again is the tenth studio album by American electronic producer Daniel Lopatin, under his alias Oneohtrix Point Never. It was released on September 29, 2023, via Warp. It features contributions from alt-rock musicians Lee Ranaldo, Xiu Xiu, Jim O'Rourke, and Lovesliescrushing as well as orchestral performances by the NOMAD Ensemble as arranged by Robert Ames.

The album received generally positive reviews from critics, and peaked at No. 33 on the UK Independent Albums Chart. Its release was preceded by the single "A Barely Lit Path".

== Background ==
Following the release of his ninth studio album in 2020, Lopatin stayed prolific working with artists such as the Weeknd and Soccer Mommy for their 2022 studio albums Dawn FM and Sometimes, Forever, respectively, and producing a score for the upcoming TV series The Curse. On August 23, 2023, Lopatin announced the album on his social media and shared a 70-second trailer. The video was shot in New York City man-on-the-street style and includes strangers trying to pronounce the name "Oneohtrix". Additionally, the artist set up a hotline for fans to call him and ask questions.

In an accompanying announcement, Lopatin described the album as "a speculative autobiography" and drew comparisons thematically to his 2015 studio album Garden of Delete. Development started out as "an interpretation of his musical identity" during his youth from a current perspective and eventually turned into an "illogical period piece". In short, the record is seen as a collaboration between the 41-year old artist at the time of the recording and his younger self. The album artwork depicts a sculpture created by Norwegian artist Matias Faldbakken and photographed by Vegard Kleven. Packaging of the album was handled by "Memory", a collaboration between Lopatin and Online Ceramics.

== Critical reception ==
Professional ratings
Aggregate scores
Source	Rating
AnyDecentMusic?	7.5/10
Metacritic	76/100
Review scores
Source	Rating
AllMusic	4.5/5 stars
Beats per Minute	77%
Loud and Quiet	7/10
Paste	8.7/10
Pitchfork	6.9/10
Slant Magazine	4/5 stars
Uncut	7/10

Again received a score of 76 out of 100 on review aggregator Metacritic based on ten critics' reviews, indicating "generally favorable" reception. Heather Phares of AllMusic wrote that "Lopatin filters the music of his young adulthood – shoegaze, post-rock, modern composition, and electronic music of all kinds – through his perspective as an artist in his forties, calling it "music that sounds like it's always in the process of becoming". Uncut called it "another dazzling yet soulless smorgasbord of bold, modern pop composition that mixes the latest AI with more old-school contributions from Lee Ranaldo and Jim O'Rourke". Pitchfork's Sam Goldner described the album as a "nostalgic jam session full of proggy synth passages and '90s alt-rock touches" and remarked that "as dissonant as it can all get, Lopatin still finds fun ways to glue disparate shapes together without the whole thing collapsing", but added that "it's beginning to feel like he cares less about making sense of his own amorphous memories than just lumping them all into a pile together". Beats per Minute's John Amen wrote, "With Again, Lopatin captures the numbing clutter and volatile emptiness of post-digital, post-humanistic life: the silence that chokes, the clamor that drowns. And while these aren't original themes (numerous artists have explored these polarities), Lopatin's response seems notably relevant and largely his own".

== Track listing ==
All tracks written by Daniel Lopatin, except where noted.

Again track listing
No.	Title	Writer(s)	Length
1.	"Elseware"		1:56
2.	"Again"		4:45
3.	"World Outside"		3:48
4.	"Krumville"	Daniel Lopatin; Nathan Salon	4:43
5.	"Locrian Midwest"		4:29
6.	"Plastic Antique"		4:30
7.	"Gray Subviolet"		2:46
8.	"The Body Trail"		4:33
9.	"Nightmare Paint"		4:19
10.	"Memories of Music"		6:04
11.	"On an Axis"	Daniel Lopatin; Nathan Salon	3:47
12.	"Ubiquity Road"		4:59
13.	"A Barely Lit Path"		6:15
Total length:			56:54

Vinyl/Japan CD edition bonus track
No.	Title	Length
14.	"My Dream Dungeon Makeover"	4:55
Total length:		61:49

== Personnel ==
=== Musicians ===
- OPN – production, voice, guitar synthesizer
- Nathan Salon - additional production, guitar, daxophone
- Xiu Xiu - voice
- Jim O'Rourke - piano
- Lee Ranaldo - guitar
- Lovesliescrushing - voice
- Jeff Gitelman - guitar
- NOMAD Ensemble - strings

=== Technical ===
- Nathan Salon – mixing, engineering
- Paul Corley - mixing
- Francesco Donadello - additional mixing
- Randall Dunn - additional engineering
- Robert Ames - arranger, conductor
- Steve Fallone - mastering engineer

== Charts ==
Chart performance for Again
Chart (2023)	Peak position
UK Album Downloads (Official Charts)	29
UK Dance Albums (Official Charts)	3
UK Independent Albums (Official Charts)	33
