= Music for Reliquary House / In 1980 I Was a Blue Square =

Music For Reliquary House / In 1980 I Was A Blue Square

Studio album by Oneohtrix Point Never and Rene Hell
- Released: September 17, 2012
- Genre: Electroacoustic; glitch
- Length: 41:08
- Label: NNA Tapes
- Producer: Daniel Lopatin; Jeff Witscher

Daniel Lopatin chronology
Replica (2011)	Music For Reliquary House (2012)	Instrumental Tourist (2012)

Rene Hell chronology
The Terminal Symphony (2011)	In 1980 I Was A Blue Square (2012)	Vanilla Call Option (2013)

Side A cover
- Music for Reliquary House

Singles from Music for Reliquary House
- 1. "Stone of Spiritual Understanding." Released: September 11, 2012

Side B cover
- In 1980 I Was a Blue Square

Singles from In 1980 I Was A Blue Square
- 1. "Meta Concrete" Released: August 28, 2012

Music For Reliquary House / In 1980 I Was A Blue Square is a split album by American electronic musician Daniel Lopatin, known by his stage name Oneohtrix Point Never, and Rene Hell, the moniker used by American electronic music artist Jeff Witscher. It showcases Lopatin's and Witscher's shift from the style of their early synthesizer-heavy recordings to electroacoustic music. The split album was released by NNA Tapes on September 17, 2012 to favorable opinions from professional reviewers.

The first half of the LP is the Oneohtrix Point Never side Music for Reliquary House, a composition and set of remixes of audio Lopatin produced for Nate Boyce's audiovisual project Reliquary House. The primary sounds of the composition are bits of computer-produced human speech reconstructed into new sounds. The second half, In 1980 I Was A Blue Square by Rene Hell, is a suite of minimalist contemporary classical music that also includes electronic sounds.

== Composition ==
For both Daniel Lopatin and Jeff Witscher, Music For Reliquary House and In 1980 I Was A Blue Square are shifts from their early synthesizer-heavy recordings to electroacoustic music. Pitchfork journalist Nick Neyland called both sides "coarse and challenging, a serrated edge severed into a once-placid template."

=== Music For Reliquary House ===
The Oneohtrix Point Never glitch composition Music for Reliquary House, is a reworking of audio Lopatin made for Reliquary House, an audiovisual piece by Nate Boyce that was performed at the Museum of Modern Art on December 17, 2011. It is a satirical envisioning of modernist sculptures by sculptors such as David Smith, Anthony Caro, Isamu Noguchi, and Tony Smith as what the press release from NNA Tapes described as "hallucinatory informatic assaults." Neyland compared Music for Reliquary House to the Stereolab album Music for the Amorphous Body Study Center (1995) in that both records are "musical digression, pulling on fibers of already extant ideas, taking them to a place ill-suited to the traditional album format." Steve Kerr of XLR8R labeled it a commentary on telecommunication, where "the chief result of its stammering, interwoven chatter is disconnectedness."

Fact magazine journalist Steve Shaw wrote that Music for Reliquary House brings together electroacoustic methods with a "noise-based, live laptop-and-MIDI-controller kind of aesthetic," and an "abundance of detail," as well as "some vicious movement and content less common to electroacoustic music," comes from this hybrid. He highlighted the composition's use of "unexpected" elements, such as rave music-esque synth stabs, "contorted" and "strained" electronic sounds, lack of transition between vocal clips, and "fleeting burst[s]." He described the piece as a "sustained drama of constant builds and drops in intensity, an extremely slow pan taking in fearful, transcendental details." Mark Shukla of The Skinny labeled the tone of the composition as a "calming, meditative quality at odds with its chaotic structure."

All of the five parts on Music for Reliquary House contain snippets of computer-synthesized human speech reconstructed into new soundscapes, which, as the press release explained, are "starkly melodic at times, but altogether harsh and inhuman as a whole." Most of the vocal samples perform atonal riffs, and in the very few moments when they perform actual melodies, they are "melodic in the odd way that internet dial-up tones' splintery, collapsing bells are," wrote Kerr. Writer Rachael Markham described the tone of the speech structure as "gentle, yet unwavering, luring you almost to the point of hypnosis." Shaw categorized Music for Reliquary House as a religious piece due to the fact that voices are the primary instruments in the composition, comparing it to the works of György Ligeti in that it is "focusing more on a harrowing awe of the almighty than hallowed worship." The composition also features what Markham labeled as "otherworldly" synthesizer sounds that are "steadily elevating like ascension into heaven, droning and sagging like stagnant church organs, tumbling over each other in a fast-paced techno speed chase."

Colin Joyce, a journalist for Beats Per Minute, found Music for Reliquary House very "harsh" and unsettling for an Oneohtrix Point Never recording, writing that Lopatin "aims here less for an ethereal sweep or space-filling meander, opting instead for pointed, harsh, and chilling textures." These harsh sounds include circular saw-like noises on "Stone of Spiritiual Understanding," high-pitched sounds on "Free Ride," and the sound effect on "The Letter" that, in the words of Neyland, "sounds like Lopatin's hard drive attempting to turn itself inside out, edging close to the collapse-of-civilization vibe of "Nil Admirari" from Returnal."

=== In 1980 I Was A Blue Square ===
In 1980 I Was A Blue Square is a suite of five tracks influenced by classical music from the middle of the 20th century. Neyland wrote that while it "bursts of willful antagonism that "zoom[s] into sporadic focus," it still serves as "introspection" after the harshness from Music for Reliquary House. It is a minimalist neo-classical work including electronically-produced sounds in the same vein as the works of acts CFCF, Telefon Tel Aviv and Tim Hecker. All of its five parts feature piano, strings, and glitchy, chaotic, and violent electronic sounds in its instrumentation. While maintaining the same styles and sounds of ambient and noise music as Witscher's previous works, In 1980 I Was A Blue Square was categorized by NNA Tapes as a contemporary piece with a combination of peaceful and aggressive tones that make "a rift of confusion that sits nicely between more vast, soundscape-like vignettes."

Joyce found In 1980 I Was A Blue Square different from the "spacey synth journeys" of Witscher's past records due to its use of acoustic instrumentation and simple compositions: "He aims less to explore the cosmos than to compose something simple and then turn it into something stirring." In describing this piece's combination of noise sounds with real instruments, Joyce analyzed, "There are obvious elements of both compositions, as string swells unearth themselves from the mire, but by and large, the haze is unidentifiable–uniform in its unique sweep, but with its components guarded. The fog is distinct, but its origins indeterminate."

"Meta Concrète" begins in a 12/8 time signature as a piano ballad with poorly-tuned chime sounds performing the lead melody. Several bit-reduced blip sounds and electronic noises then come into the track. "Quelque Terreur" consists of string sections, synthesized birdsong and synthesizer pad chords. "Prelude To The Bridge" was categorized by Shaw as a fast-paced "extraordinary 21st Century romantic" "Glass- or Nyman-like piano adventure" that includes synths, "mournful strings" and "frantic frequency fits." "Qi," also known as "Variation In C," is a track involving woodwind, string and organ sounds fading in and out. Neyland used the track as an example of the contrasts in emotion and style that take place on In 1980 I Was A Blue Square, describing it as "one part oppressive death march, one part tilt up toward the sky." "Bl, Qs" is a variation of "Meta Concrète," containing the same chime, piano sounds, and 12/8 structure but now including the addition of vibrating sul ponticello strings.

== Release ==
“Meta Concrete” was released as the lead single of Music For Reliquary House / In 1980 I Was A Blue Square on August 28, 2012. On September 11, Dummy magazine premiered "Stone of Spiritual Understanding." On September 12, Music For Reliquary House / In 1980 I Was A Blue Square became available for streaming worldwide. It was released on vinyl and in digital stores in the United Kingdom on September 17, 2012 and in the United States a day later.

== Reception ==
Professional ratings
Review scores
Source	Rating
The 405	8/10
Beats per Minute	Music For Reliquary House: 74% In 1980 I Was A Blue Square: 81%
Fact	4/5
The Line of Best Fit	6.5/10
Pitchfork	6.6/10
The Skinny	3/5 stars
XLR8R	7/10

Markham, who reviewed for The 405, honored the split LP as "creative, original and above all personal, creating a view into the listener's individual paradise." Joyce spotlighted the album for having two sides being done by separate artists, writing that "without the organic warmth of Witscher’s side, Lopatin’s vocal manipulations might have come across as too unwieldy, too formless, too haughty to be revisited with any sort of regularity." Shaw praised Music for Reliquary House as a "dynamic total listen" while his opinion on In 1980 I Was a Blue Square was, "while the premise of pairing naïve, genuinely lovely classical compositions with the extremities and subtleties of sonic technology is a simple idea, the ability to do so successfully, featuring them together in such a way that the pieces are unfinished without one or the other, is far harder. Hell has done so, modestly and with highly commendable results."

Shukla praised the Oneohtrix Point Never side as "an unexpectedly soothing, though not particularly adventurous, excursion into the realm of glitch." However, he criticized the Rene Hell piece as "jarringly discordant and disappointingly polite, often coming across like a less elegantly realised take on Keith Fullerton Whitman's Variations for Oud and Synthesizer," but still found it "strangely compelling" due to its "heavy-handed play of contrasts." Kerr described the listening experience of Music for Reliquary House as listening to a film score without watching the accompanying film: "It's pleasing enough, but rarely transcendent. There's an innate feeling throughout that one piece of the puzzle is missing."

== Track listing ==
Side A: Music For Reliquary House by Oneohtrix Point Never
No.	Title	Sculpture by	Length
1.	"Stone of Spiritual Understanding"	Isamu Noguchi	5:07
2.	"Midday"	Anthony Caro	3:16
3.	"Free Ride"	Tony Smith	6:54
4.	"Cubi X"	David Smith	2:58
5.	"The Letter"	D. Smith	4:02
Total length:			22:17

Side B: In 1980 I Was A Blue Square by Rene Hell
No.	Title	Alternate Title	Length
1.	"Meta Concrete"		4:12
2.	"Untitled Solo 4"	"Quelque Terreur"	2:29
3.	"The Bridge"	"Prelude To The Bridge"	3:22
4.	"Qi"	"Variation in C"	6:40
5.	"Quick Folding Motion"	"Bl Qs""	2:08
Total length:			18:51

== Release history ==
Region	Date	Format(s)	Label
Worldwide	September 12, 2012	Streaming	NNA Tapes
United Kingdom	September 17, 2012	Digital download; vinyl	NNA Tapes
United States	September 18, 2012	Digital download; vinyl	NNA Tapes
