= Marty Supreme (soundtrack) =

Marty Supreme (Original Motion Picture Soundtrack)

Film score by Daniel Lopatin
- Released: December 25, 2025
- Recorded: 2025
- Studios: Electric Lady, New York City
- Genre: Electronic
- Length: 46:15
- Label: A24 Music
- Producers: Nathan Salon; Joshua Eustis

Daniel Lopatin chronology
Tranquilizer (2025)	Marty Supreme (Original Motion Picture Soundtrack) (2025)

Marty Supreme (Original Motion Picture Soundtrack) is the film score composed by Daniel Lopatin to the sports comedy-drama film Marty Supreme directed and produced by Josh Safdie starring Timothée Chalamet. The film score was released through A24 Music day-and-date with the film on December 25, 2025. Lopatin's work has been nominated for numerous accolades including the Critics' Choice Movie Award for Best Score amongst others, and it was the first Best New Music designated record given to a film score by Pitchfork.

== Background ==
Daniel Lopatin, who worked with the Safdie brothers on their previous films, composed the score for Marty Supreme. He read the script during a flight to Los Angeles in 2023 and developed the themes of the film in his mind, both in poetic essence and the armature of the score. Safdie curated a Spotify playlist to guide Lopatin through the composition which included music from artists such as New Order, Tears for Fears, Peter Gabriel, Fats Domino and Constance Demby.

Lopatin admitted that he and Safdie were both open to the idea of "time being a little bit malleable, a little bit gelatinous", which made them feel like the score was "alive and ticking and doing things". Both of them worked on the score daily for 10 weeks; Lopatin rented a small studio space in Manhattan for scoring the film. The 1950s setting of the film gave rise to a "radical use of electronica". Lopatin worked on the score for the film at the same time as his studio album Tranquilizer (2025), which had a tight production deadline.

The score's producer and mix engineer Nathan Salon mixed the score in Studio C at Electric Lady Studios in New York City. Contributors included Laraaji, Natalie Mering, Nathan Salon, Joshua Eustis, and the Synchron Stage Choir.

== Release ==
The soundtrack was announced on December 3, 2025, featuring 23 tracks. The album was released day-and-date with the film on December 25, 2025, through A24 Music.

== Critical reception ==
Professional ratings
Review scores
Source	Rating
Pitchfork	8.3/10

Critics praised Daniel Lopatin's score in the first reactions of the premiere.

Jamie Graham of Empire praised the "shimmering, surging electro score" as "part inspirational John Hughes movie, part cosmic mysticism and part John Carpenter menace." Clarisse Loughrey of The Independent wrote that "[w]hile Marty Supreme is set in 1952, Daniel Lopatin's electronic score is distinctly Eighties in flavour – Marty's running so fast at life that he's ended up three decades in the future." Chris Evangelista of /Film wrote "Daniel Lopatin's exciting score [...] gives everything a vibrant, thrilling aura." David Ehrlich of IndieWire wrote that "Daniel Lopatin’s synth-driven score — so intricate and voluble that it functions like a second screenplay — hurls Marty towards the horizon by tapping into an anxiety that period-appropriate music could never hope to match. Kristy Puchko of Mashable described the score as "smartly anachronistic. While the movie is set in the 1950s, the score is loaded with synth and percussion that feels more attuned to '80s sports movies like Rocky or The Karate Kid. Along with adding a pulse-pounding energy to Marty Supreme, this score also suggests that its wild anti-hero is perhaps a man before his time."

Dominic Griffin of Looper compared Lopatin's "dreamy, synth score" with "Uncut Gems (2019) if it was The Karate Kid (1984) or some other aspirational sports drama from that era." Chris Bumbray of JoBlo.com wrote "[Daniel] Lopatin's score is evocative of Tangerine Dream, which is appropriate as the film seems heavily influenced by Risky Business." David Rooney of The Hollywood Reporter credited the film's "audacious" use of music, including Lopatin's "shimmering" score. Brian Tallerico of RogerEbert.com wrote "Lopatin's pulsing score, along with the crazy needle drops, becomes a character itself." In his review for Pitchfork, Sam Goldner concluded: "Lopatin's music is key to Marty Supreme's emotions, and particularly its ending—his gorgeous 'Force of Life' complicates the film's commentary on ambition, evoking how limitless and meaningless our dreams can be. It's all a big swing, and it's all a big hit."

Ross Bonaime of Collider wrote "jarring score" adds to the momentum, "escalates Marty's every movement and makes us inherently uncomfortable as things go from bad to worse." Robbie Collin of The Daily Telegraph called it a "jaggedly seductive score". Marshall Shaffer of Slant Magazine wrote "pulse-pounding synth-pop score". Vikram Murthi of The Film Stage wrote "Daniel Lopatin's synth-pop score, combined with an anachronistic use of 1980s pop hits, productively clashes with Marty Supreme's Eisenhower-era setting: both sound and image encapsulate different defining eras of American conservatism where skepticism of The New runs rampant, embodying the spirit of a protagonist stuck in the wrong time." Pete Hammond of Deadline Hollywood wrote "Daniel Lopatin's swell musical score that hits all the right notes in ping-ponging from one mood to another".

== Track listing ==
All tracks written by Daniel Lopatin, except for track 6 which is an interpolation of Constance Demby's "Novus Magnificat, Pt. 2: The Flying Bach." All tracks produced by Nathan Salon and Joshua Eustis.

No.	Title	Length
1.	"The Call"	1:33
2.	"Marty's Dream"	1:07
3.	"Endo's Game"	1:56
4.	"The Apple"	2:07
5.	"Pure Joy"	0:29
6.	"Holocaust Honey"	2:58
7.	"The Humbling"	2:38
8.	"Motherstone"	0:52
9.	"The Scape"	3:38
10.	"Tub Falls"	1:29
11.	"F***ing Mensch"	0:46
12.	"Rockwell Ink"	1:12
13.	"Hoff's"	1:53
14.	"Seward Park"	1:45
15.	"The Necklace"	2:07
16.	"Vampire's Castle"	2:27
17.	"Back to Hoff's"	1:21
18.	"Shootout"	1:42
19.	"I Love You, Tokyo"	2:16
20.	"The Real Game"	4:50
21.	"Endo's Game" (Reprise)	2:00
22.	"Force of Life"	2:43
23.	"End Credits" (I Still Love You, Tokyo)	2:38

== Personnel ==
Credits adapted from film's end credits.

- Daniel Lopatin – composition, synthesizers, keyboards
- Nathan Salon – production, mixing, synthesizers, alto saxophone, drum and mallet programming, percussion
- Joshua Eustis – production, string and voice orchestration, tenor saxophone, fretless bass
- Czech National Symphony Orchestra – strings
- Vienna Synchron Choir – voices
- Laraaji – zither, percussion, mbira, kalimba
- Natalie Mering – voice
- Bryan Senti – violin
- Izaak Mills – alto flute, flute, piccolo, alto saxophone
- James Richardson – bass, guitar
- Josh Safdie – snakebites, forces of nature, locomotion
- Alex Poeppel – additional engineering
- John Rooney – additional engineering
- Arjan Miranda – music editor
- Dave Kutch – mastering

== Charts ==
Chart performance for Marty Supreme (Original Motion Picture Soundtrack)
Chart (2026)	Peak position
French Physical Albums (SNEP)	134
Japanese Dance & Soul Albums (Oricon)	5
UK Soundtrack Albums (Official Charts)	10

== Accolades ==
Award	Date of ceremony	Category	Recipient(s)	Result	Ref.
Critics' Choice Awards	January 4, 2026	Best Score	Daniel Lopatin	Nominated	
Hollywood Music in Media Awards	November 19, 2025	Best Original Score in a Feature Film	Daniel Lopatin	Nominated	
New York Film Critics Online	December 15, 2025	Best Use of Music	Marty Supreme	Nominated	
Washington D.C. Area Film Critics Association	December 7, 2025	Best Score	Daniel Lopatin	Nominated	
