= Age Of =

Studio album by Oneohtrix Point Never
- Released: June 1, 2018
- Recorded: 2016–2018
- Genres: Electronic; avant-garde; baroque pop
- Length: 42:32
- Label: Warp
- Producers: Daniel Lopatin; James Blake (add.)

Oneohtrix Point Never chronology
Good Time (2017)	Age Of (2018)	Uncut Gems (2019)

Singles from Age Of
- 1. "Black Snow" Released: April 26, 2018; 2. "We'll Take It" Released: July 20, 2018; 3. "The Station" Released: July 27, 2018

Age Of is the eighth studio album by American electronic producer Oneohtrix Point Never, released on June 1, 2018, on Warp Records. Recorded over two years, it is the first Oneohtrix Point Never album to prominently feature Daniel Lopatin's own vocals. The album was accompanied by the MYRIAD tour, which premiered as a "conceptual concertscape" in 2018 at the Park Avenue Armory and ended its run in 2019.

It features contributions from James Blake (who additionally produced and mixed the album), Anohni, Prurient, Kelsey Lu and Eli Keszler. The artwork, which employs Jim Shaw's "The Great Whatsit" as a central image, was designed by David Rudnick. While not entering the official United States Billboard 200 chart, it peaked at number 59 on the magazine's Top Current Albums chart.

== Background ==
Lopatin produced Age Of in parts of a two-year period, during which he was also producing for other artists, including Anohni, FKA Twigs, Iggy Pop, and David Byrne. After composing the soundtrack for the Safdie Brothers' 2017 film Good Time, Lopatin moved to an Airbnb lodge in South Central Massachusetts, derived from his aspiration to live out the modern cliche of musicians moving to the woods to record albums; the eerie atmosphere in the lodge at nighttime influenced his desire to make "weird, little nightmare ballads".

In addition to Lopatin's own singing, the album also features vocal performances from Anohni and Prurient, while instrumentalists Kelsey Lu and Eli Keszler contribute to several tracks. When the record was nearly finished, Lopatin reached out to musician James Blake to contribute to the mixing process, eventually traveling to Los Angeles to complete the album.

The track "The Station" was originally composed as a demo for R&B singer Usher which was ultimately not used. On July 9, 2018, Lopatin released the original topline (vocal melody) demo for The Station through Sendspace. The track "Toys 2" imagines a theoretical sequel to the 1992 film Toys where actor Robin Williams' image has been recreated with CGI (as his will specifically forbade any usage of his image after his death), and pokes fun at the common electronic music trope of composing a soundtrack to a theoretical film (which Lopatin described as "horribly cliché").

== Concept and MYRIAD ==
Influences on Age Of included Stanley Kubrick's 1968 film 2001: A Space Odyssey, which inspired the narrative of the album's accompanying performance installation and tour MYRIAD, as well as William Strauss's The Fourth Turning, a favorite book of former White House Chief Strategist Steve Bannon, which Lopatin described as "insidious, like the voice of a computer insisting on the truth about history without any sensitivity given to how complex and non-linear systems might be"; Lopatin was subsequently inspired to "[use] that sort of taxonomy as a kind of farce to then create these little frameworks for understanding". Other inspirations included the writings of the 1990s multidisciplinary collective Cybernetic Culture Research Unit and the works of singer-songwriters such as Bruce Cockburn, Bob Dylan, and Paul Simon.

Around the time Lopatin began finalizing Age Of in his Airbnb lodge, he began working on the concept for MYRIAD, a conceptual concert performance which premiered at Park Avenue Armory. He described the concept as a four-part "epochal song cycle" showcasing the idiocy of previous generations of living organisms. The loose story concerns a group of artificial intelligences near the end of time named a "Limitless Living Informational Intelligence" (represented in the MYRIAD logo as nine squares) which, for leisurely purposes, attempt to replicate the cultures and behaviors of the previously existent human species. It does this by determining an "average" of human experiences through the species' "recorded output", and does so through imperfect, heuristic techniques. The show was consequently divided into four sections, each representing an epoch of the cycle concept loosely inspired by the Strauss–Howe generational theory: the Age of Ecco, the Age of Harvest, the Age of Excess, and the Age of Bondage. Ecco is "a phase of pre-evolutionary ignorance", Harvest is "living in agrarian harmony with the world", Excess is "the age of unchecked industrial ambition", and Bondage is "an era of engorgement, wherein "we keep making more and more shit until there's no space left."

MYRIAD mainly featured "three-hundred pound sculptures that hang from the ceiling like kebabs that secrete ooze", and a full ensemble that toured to perform songs from Age Of, including Eli Keszler, Kelly Moran and Aaron David Ross. The sculptures, as well as the visuals displayed on five polygon panels, were created by frequent Oneohtrix Point Never collaborator Nate Boyce. Initially, Lopatin planned for each of the album's four epoches to be represented by fragrances, the more noisy epochs being pleasant to the nose to make a "weird dissonance". However, due to lack of time and resources, that part of the plan was scrapped.

== Composition ==
Whereas previous Oneohtrix Point Never albums followed musical styles from only distinctive eras, Age Of is the first album by Lopatin to incorporate elements of unique genres from a variety of periods, hence the "incompleteness" of its title according to reviewer Heather Phares, and his first pop-song-oriented release since his work for Ford & Lopatin.

The sound palettes it uses are those from a variety of styles such as chamber pop, "android"-like folk and country music, yacht rock, smooth jazz, R&B, Future-style soul, black metal, new age, and stadium pop, as well as post-industrial sounds on tracks like "Warning", "We'll Take It" and "Same", and, in particular, baroque music and medieval music on the opening title track, "Age Of". Critics also noted elements of Lopatin's past discography being present on Age Of.

The instrumentation of Age Of is made up of MIDI harpsichords, guitars, pianos, brass and vocals, as well as Lopatin's trademark unorthodox sound design, samples and synth presets. The LP's use of the harpsichord shows its similarities "with Eastern instruments such as the koto and with rapid-fire electronic melodies", wrote Phares.

== Critical reception ==
Professional ratings
Aggregate scores
Source	Rating
AnyDecentMusic?	7.8/10
Metacritic	83/100
Review scores
Source	Rating
AllMusic	4.5/5 stars
The A.V. Club	A−
Consequence of Sound	B+
Mixmag	9/10
Mojo	4/5 stars
The Observer	4/5 stars
Pitchfork	7.8/10
Q	4/5 stars
Resident Advisor	4.0/5
Uncut	6/10

Age Of was critically well-received upon its distribution. Some reviewers praised the album's use of collaborators. Reviewing the album for AllMusic, Heather Phares called Age Of a "landmark work" for Lopatin. She praised it as his "widest-ranging" release, elaborating that he "matches the album's ambition with plenty of emotion" and "gives his music exciting new shapes." Ross Devlin of The Skinny, in a five-star review of the record, also highlighted the album's amount of ambition, particularly the "wealth of exquisitely baroque moments, exploring history as a pliable, multi-dimensional rift", that gave it "exceptional sonic depth". The Observer praised Age Of for continuing the "off-kilter composition and unexpected instrumentation" of Lopatin's previous releases, and critic Matt McDermott highlighted that the producer increased his musical range with the record: "It's a dizzying trip meant to shore up Lopatin's status as an avant-garde auteur while aiding his forays into mainstream pop culture."

Age Of was ranked the 15th best release of the year in The Wire magazine's annual critics' poll.

== Track listing ==
All tracks are written by Daniel Lopatin.

No.	Title	Length
1.	"Age Of"	3:24
2.	"Babylon"	3:04
3.	"Manifold"	1:49
4.	"The Station"	4:19
5.	"Toys 2"	4:38
6.	"Black Snow"	3:40
7.	"Myriad Industries"	1:07
8.	"Warning"	2:38
9.	"We'll Take It"	3:45
10.	"Same"	2:01
11.	"RayCats"	3:40
12.	"Still Stuff That Doesn't Happen"	4:21
13.	"Last Known Image of a Song"	4:06
Total length:		42:32

Japanese edition bonus track
No.	Title	Length
14.	"Trance 1"	3:54
Total length:		46:26

Notes

- "Myriad Industries" is stylized as "myriad.industries".

Sample credits

- "Age Of" contains a sample of "Blow the Wind" by Jocelyn Pook.
- "Manifold" contains a sample from "Overture (Ararat the Border Crossing)" by Tayfun Erdem; and a sample from "Venice Beach in Winter" (listed in the liner notes as "a keyboard sample from Reharmonization") by Julian Bradley.
- "Myriad Industries" contains a sample of "EchoSpace" by Gil Trythall.

== Accolades ==
Publication	Accolade	Rank	Ref.
Exclaim!	Top 10 Dance and Electronic Albums	5	
Highsnobiety	Top 25 Albums of 2018	21	
Mixmag	Top 50 Albums of 2018	22	
Spin Magazine	Top 51 Albums of 2018	10	
The 405	Top 50 Albums of 2018	4	
The Wire	Top 50 Albums of 2018	15	

== Personnel ==
- Daniel Lopatin – production, lead vocals, album art, design
- James Blake – additional production, mixing, keyboards
- Gabriel Schuman, Joshua Smith and Evan Sutton – assistance
- Greg Calbi – mastering
- David Rudnick – album art, design
- Prurient – vocals
- Kelsey Lu – keyboards
- Anohni – vocals
- Eli Keszler – drums
- Shaun Trujillo – words

== Charts ==
Chart (2018)	Peak position
Belgian Albums (Ultratop Flanders)	121
Japanese Albums (Oricon)	109
Scottish Albums (Official Charts)	72
UK Dance Albums (Official Charts)	11
UK Independent Albums (Official Charts)	13
US Top Current Albums (Billboard)	59
US Heatseekers Albums (Billboard)	4
US Top Dance Albums (Billboard)	8
