= R Plus Seven =

Studio album by Oneohtrix Point Never
- Released: September 30, 2013
- Genres: Electronica; experimental; avant-garde; new age; utopian virtual
- Length: 42:56
- Label: Warp
- Producers: Daniel Lopatin; Paul Corley

Oneohtrix Point Never chronology
Instrumental Tourist (2012)	R Plus Seven (2013)	Garden of Delete (2015)

Singles from R Plus Seven
- 1. "Still Life" Released: June 25, 2013; 2. "Problem Areas" Released: August 1, 2013; 3. "Zebra" Released: September 5, 2013

R Plus Seven is the sixth studio album by American electronic musician Oneohtrix Point Never, released on September 30, 2013, as his debut album on Warp Records. The album's musical palette draws heavily on the synthetic sounds of MIDI instruments, 1980s synth presets, and VSTs.

R Plus Seven received critical acclaim, and was included on the year-end lists of several music publications. Its release came alongside several collaborations on visual accompaniment with contemporary artists such as Jon Rafman, Takeshi Murata, and Nate Boyce.

== Background and recording ==
Differing from the sample-based techniques of Lopatin's 2011 album Replica which drew on lo-fi audio sources such as commercials from the 1980s and 1990s, the recording of R Plus Seven instead saw him work extensively with the synthetic sounds of MIDI instruments and presets, synth patches and VSTs. He also incorporated procedural composing methods and spoken word script samples created from a range of texts. It is the first Oneohtrix Point Never record not to feature Lopatin's signature Roland Juno-60 synthesizer. Regarding the sonic palette, he explained:

I like to be manipulated by the sounds I'm using, and then struggle to find some sort of commonality with those things [...] When I play a pipe organ or have this like Hollywood choir at my disposal, it's going to tap into some kind of cliché matrix of ideas in my mind, and allow me to wrestle with it.

Lopatin would later describe it as a "calm" record influenced by and aiming to musically capture his experience of "domestic bliss", and also confessed to being influenced by the ideas of object-oriented ontology and American contemporary artist Takeshi Murata, specifically "this idea of musical objects – instead of focusing on music, thinking of sounds as these acute choices that are grouped together, that create a sense of place, a cultural sense of contrast [...] a way of giving inanimate objects a kind of secret life."

The cover art is a reproduced still taken from the 1982 experimental film Le ravissement de Frank N. Stein by Swiss animator Georges Schwizgebel. The album title is a reference to the procedural writing technique, "N+7", used by French writing group Oulipo, which involves replacing any noun in a text with the seventh one to follow it in a dictionary.

== Composition ==
"Zebra"
30 second clip of "Zebra", the fifth track of R Plus Seven.

The sound palette of R Plus Seven incorporates a range of synthesized sounds spanning textures from early samplers, clear-sounding presets from the 1980s and 1990s, and modern "realist" virtual instruments found on DAWs. Pitchfork's Mark Richardson said that the album plays with "our collective unconscious of music technology" to make something "strange and otherworldly and, most importantly, rich with feeling." He stated that "there's a weird kind of innocence in this sound palette," comparing it to James Ferraro's 2011 album Far Side Virtual which similarly extensively incorporated digital instrumentation, but added that "Lopatin's music doesn't get hung up on irony, even though it's definitely in the mix." Adam Harper of Dummy compared the album to English experimental group Art of Noise, writing that it "might be what the computer that used to work for the Art of Noise does on its own time, an AI enthusiastically generating art, who once wouldn't admit to preferring modernism to postmodernism but now refuses to be ironic or ashamed of the so-called uncanny valley." Andy Battaglia of Rolling Stone described the album as being akin to "holy music, even if wholly weird," and compared it to the works of composers Philip Glass and Steve Reich in terms of rhythm and repetition. Richardson referred to the album as "Fifth World Music", an allusion to Jon Hassell and Brian Eno's Fourth World, Vol. 1: Possible Musics, which similarly blended natural imagery with manipulated sound and synthesized sounds. The Skinny wrote that every song is significantly different in structure and timbre, with some songs playing on feelings reminiscent of cosmic jazz music. AllMusic wrote that "its subversive glossiness suggests that its tracks were made from pop songs that were shattered into shards that are as alluring as they are difficult to piece together."

Tracks like "Americans" and "Inside World" have been described as musically exploring differences between the Real and virtual representations of "realness", using then-exotic "turn-of-the-80s" sounds found on samplers of the time like the Fairlight CMI and the E-mu Emulator as well as other delicate digital sounds to conjure stilted and sterilized imagery of jungles, beaches, forests and home environments. According to David Wolfson of Beat per Minute, R Plus Seven explores themes of morphogenesis, procedural composition and cryogenics. Describing the song "Zebra" in particular, Wolfson observed a "lively synth progression in the first part of the song" serving as the refrain for "an exercise in procedural composition", followed by "the claustrophobic ambient space of the second part" serving as "a representation of cryogenics", concluding that "the way the song progresses from section to section, with parts building up before splintering off into something completely new, is entirely morphogenetic in form."

== Visual collaborations ==
Between the announcement and the eventual release of R Plus Seven, Lopatin collaborated with a number of contemporary artists on visual accompaniments to tracks and updates on the official OPN website. The first was an excerpt of "Still Life", released with a video by Nate Boyce, a frequent collaborator with Oneohtrix Point Never's live shows and subsequent director of his music videos. A video for "Problem Areas" by Takeshi Murata followed at the beginning of August alongside an interactive version at pointnever.com. The second update to the site came from American visual artist Jacob Ciocci alongside the song "Zebra" at the beginning of September with a final video prior to the release directed by Jon Rafman for the song "Still Life". Pitchfork described the video in an article dated September 25, 2013, as it being a piece that:

[...] collects bizarre and disturbing low-grade internet footage – images of decrepit computer systems, strange anime art and characters posing for webcams, a few Furries, and more, bookended by clips of a man who looks like he's about to blast his own brains out.

A final video for "Boring Angel", directed by American digital artist John Michael Boling, appeared in December 2013.

== Critical reception ==
Professional ratings
Aggregate scores
Source	Rating
AnyDecentMusic?	7.7/10
Metacritic	81/100
Review scores
Source	Rating
AllMusic	4/5 stars
Consequence of Sound	4.5/5 stars
Exclaim!	8/10
Mojo	4/5 stars
NME	6/10
Pitchfork	8.4/10
Q	3/5 stars
Rolling Stone	3.5/4 stars
Spin	8/10
XLR8R	9.5/10

At Metacritic, which assigns a normalized rating out of 100 to reviews from critics, the album received an average score of 81, based on 30 reviews, indicating "universal acclaim". On the album, Heather Phares of AllMusic wrote: "For the most part, the album showcases Oneohtrix Point Never's restlessness and ambition in flattering ways; if it's equal parts mystifying and beautiful, it's also a puzzle well worth trying to figure out." Sasha Geffen of Consequence of Sound stated: "R Plus Seven might be the first album to crystallize the simultaneous joy and terror inherent in a life of constant connection and constant surveillance. With music that simultaneously unnerves and pleases, Lopatin digs out the ghost in the algorithm." Mark Richardson of Pitchfork noted the album's conceptual merits but stated that "you don’t listen to this record thinking about theory; it’s beautiful stuff, with chords and tunes and sections you remember," concluding "R Plus Seven doesn’t have quite the disembodied weirdness of Replica, but it’s no less accomplished, another intriguing chapter from an artist whose work remains alive with possibility."

Marty Sartini Garner of Filter also compared the album to the artist's previous work: "R Plus Seven isn’t the masterpiece of technical error that its predecessor was; it’s the dissection of a heart." Andy Beta of Spin wrote: "With his first album for Warp, OPN proves his mettle amid labelmates like Aphex Twin and Flying Lotus." Bram E. Gieben of The Skinny stated: "A visionary artist at the height of his powers, this is in many ways his most accessible and uplifting work so far," while also adding that "each track contains distinct movements, bearing out the occasional comparisons made between Lopatin's work and classical composition." Nevertheless, Louis Pattison of NME was mixed in his assessment of the record: "There are a few moments of elegant sensuality – like the tumbling, androgynous voices of 'He She' – but by and large it's like one of Jeff Koons' uber-kitsch sculptures: gleaming, opulent, but kinda hard to love."

=== Accolades ===
R Plus Seven was on several year-end lists by critics, topping Tiny Mix Tapes's year-end list and ranking at number 43 on the annual poll Pazz & Jop by The Village Voice.

Publication	Rank	Ref
Year-end
CMJ	20	
Consequence of Sound	16	
Drowned in Sound	59	
Exclaim! (Dance and Electronic)	9	
Fact	34	
Gorilla vs. Bear	5	
musicOMH	83	
Pitchfork	24	
The Quietus	18	
Spin	23	
Sputnikmusic	28	
Stereogum	30	
Tiny Mix Tapes	1	
The Village Voice (Pazz & Jop)	43	
The Wire	6	
XLR8R	3	
2010–2014
Fact	75	

== Track listing ==
All music is composed by Daniel Lopatin.

No.	Title	Length
1.	"Boring Angel"	4:16
2.	"Americans"	5:18
3.	"He She"	1:33
4.	"Inside World"	3:53
5.	"Zebra"	6:44
6.	"Along"	5:23
7.	"Problem Areas"	3:06
8.	"Cryo"	2:47
9.	"Still Life"	4:53
10.	"Chrome Country"	5:15
Total length:		42:56

Japanese edition bonus track
No.	Title	Length
11.	"Gone"	1:06
Total length:		44:17

== Personnel ==
R Plus Seven personnel, as adapted from AllMusic.

- Daniel Lopatin – performance, production, art direction

=== Technical ===
- Paul Corley – production
- Paul Evans – engineering
- Valgeir Sigurðsson – mastering

=== Artwork and design ===
- Timothy Saccenti – photography
- Robert Beatty – additional artwork, design
- Georges Schwizgebel – cover art

== Charts ==
Chart (2013)	Peak position
Belgian Albums (Ultratop Flanders)	111
UK Albums (OCC)	134
UK Dance Albums (Official Charts)	28
UK Independent Albums (Official Charts)	37
US Top Dance Albums (Billboard)	11
US Heatseekers Albums (Billboard)	16
