= Oneohtrix Point Never =

American musician

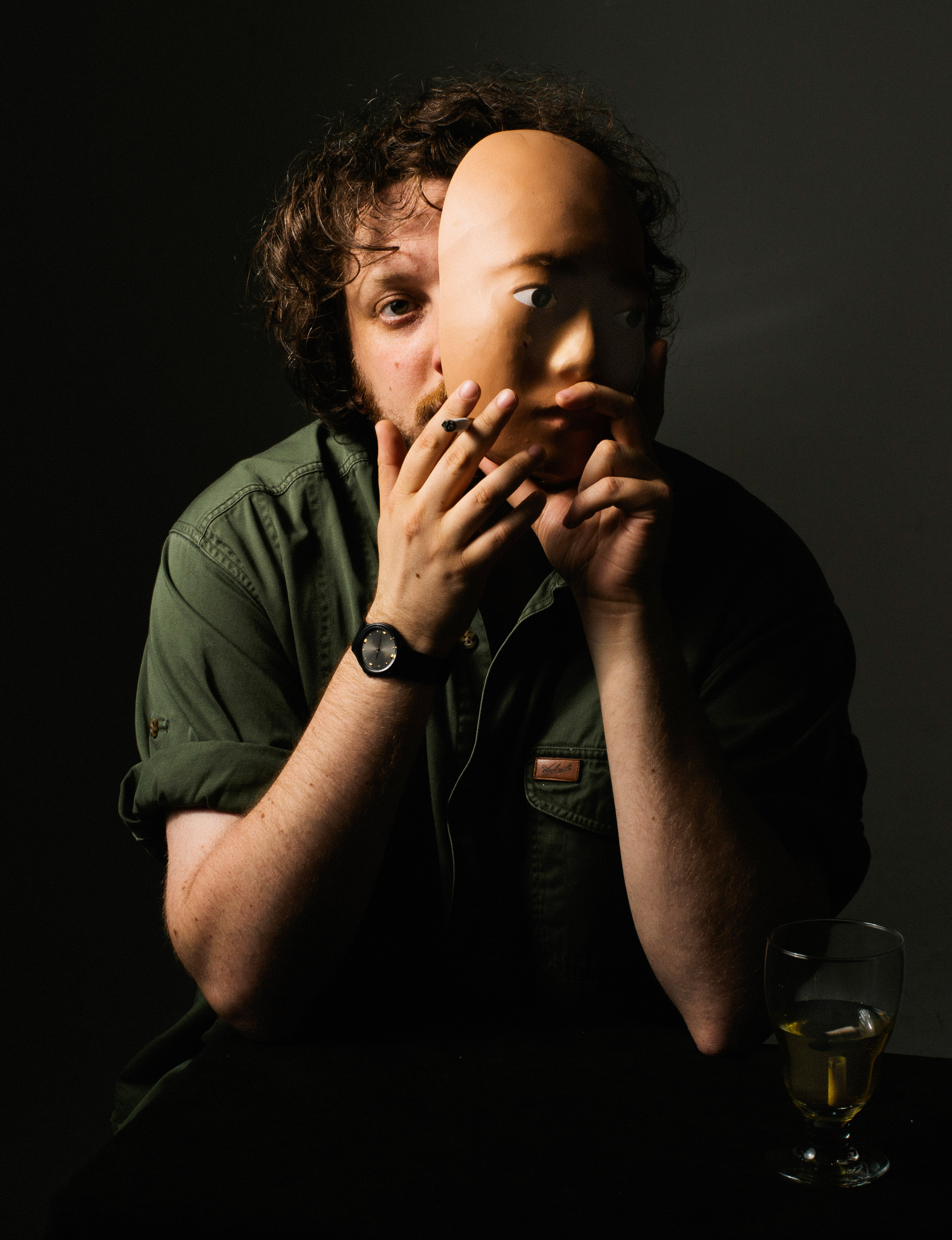
- Lopatin in a 2013 press photo

Background information
- Also known as: 0PN; OPN; Magic Oneohtrix Point Never; Chuck Person; Dania Shapes; KGB Man; sunsetcorp
- Born: Daniel Lopatin; July 25, 1982 (age 44); Boston, Massachusetts, U.S.
- Genres: Electronic; experimental; plunderphonics; ambient; avant-pop; hypnagogic pop; vaporwave
- Works: Daniel Lopatin discography
- Years active: 2004–present
- Labels: Warp; Software; Mexican Summer; Editions Mego; No Fun
- Website: pointnever.com

Daniel Lopatin (born July 25, 1982), best known as Oneohtrix Point Never or opn, is an American electronic music producer, composer, singer, and songwriter. His work has experimented with tropes from an eclectic range of musical genres and eras, and has featured sample-based composition, analog and software synthesis, and complex MIDI production.

Lopatin began his career in the early 2000s as part of Brooklyn's noise music scene and later received early acclaim for the synthesizer-based compilation Rifts (2009) as well as the influential vaporwave side-project Chuck Person's Eccojams Vol. 1 (2010). He signed with Warp Records in 2013, and has since released studio albums on the label to critical praise. He has also contributed production work to various artists, most extensively the Weeknd, Moses Sumney, and Soccer Mommy.

He has composed film scores, most prominently in collaboration with the Safdie brothers on the films Good Time (2017), Uncut Gems (2019), and Marty Supreme (2025); the first won him the Soundtrack Award at the 2017 Cannes Film Festival.

== Early life ==
Lopatin was born and raised in Massachusetts, and is the son of Russian-Jewish emigrants both with musical backgrounds. Some of his first experiments with electronic music were inspired by his father's music collection and his Roland Juno-60 synthesizer, an instrument that Lopatin would inherit and go on to use extensively in his own music. In high school, Lopatin played synthesizer in groups with friends and future collaborator Joel Ford, performing at school events. Lopatin attended Hampshire College in Massachusetts before moving to Brooklyn, New York, to attend graduate school at Pratt Institute, studying archival science; the field of study would go on to influence aspects of his music and artistic practice. During that time, he also became interested and involved in Brooklyn's underground noise music scene.

== Career ==
=== 2007–2012: Early career, Rifts, Returnal, and Replica ===
Lopatin initially released music under a number of aliases and as part of several groups, including Infinity Window and Astronaut, before adopting the pseudonym Oneohtrix Point Never, a verbal play on the name of the Boston FM radio station Magic 106.7. Early OPN recordings are regarded as drawing inspiration from 1970s and 80s arpeggiated synthesizer music, new-age music tropes, and contemporary developments in noise music. Lopatin released a series of cassette and CD-R projects interspersed with a trilogy of full-length albums: Betrayed in the Octagon (2007), Zones Without People (2009), and Russian Mind (2009). Much of this material was eventually collected on the 2009 compilation Rifts, which brought him critical acclaim; it was named the second-best album of 2009 by UK magazine The Wire. The same year, Lopatin released the audio-visual DVD project Memory Vague, which included his profile-raising YouTube video "nobody here" from his channel sunsetcorp. His work during this period would be associated with the late 2000s underground hypnagogic pop trend, American noise and post-noise scene. At the time, Lopatin coined the term "floorcore" to describe a previous group he was in.

In June 2010, Lopatin followed Rifts with his major label debut Returnal, released on Editions Mego. In the same year, he released the influential limited-edition pseudonymous cassette Chuck Person's Eccojams Vol. 1, which would help inspire the 2010s Internet-based genre vaporwave, and he formed the duo Games (later renamed Ford & Lopatin) with childhood friend Joel Ford. Lopatin's next album, Replica, was released in 2011 on his newly formed label Software Recording, to further critical praise. On it, Lopatin developed a sample-based approach that drew on the audio of 1980s and '90s television advertisements. Also that year, Lopatin participated in the collaborative album FRKWYS Vol. 7 with musicians David Borden, James Ferraro, Samuel Godin and Laurel Halo as part of RVNG's label series; Ford & Lopatin released Channel Pressure, and OPN was chosen to perform at the All Tomorrow's Parties festival. Lopatin and visual artist Nate Boyce collaborated on the 2011 Reliquary House performance installation; the music from this project would later be released on the split OPN/Rene Hell album Music for Reliquary House / In 1980 I Was a Blue Square (2012). In 2012, Lopatin collaborated with Tim Hecker on the album Instrumental Tourist.

=== 2013–2016: Signing with Warp, R Plus Seven, and Garden of Delete ===
In 2013, Lopatin signed with Warp Records. His label debut, R Plus Seven, was released on September 30, 2013, to positive reception. Lopatin collaborated with several artists on visual accompaniments, live performances, and internet projects for the album, among them his frequent collaborator Nate Boyce; Jon Rafman; Takeshi Murata; Jacob Ciocci, and John Michael Boling. Also in 2013, Lopatin composed his first film score—for Sofia Coppola's film The Bling Ring, a collaboration with Brian Reitzell—and OPN participated in the Warp x Tate event and was commissioned to create a piece inspired by Jeremy Deller's The History of the World.

"Zebra"
30 second clip of Oneohtrix Point Never's "Zebra" from Lopatin's 2013 Warp debut, R Plus Seven

In 2014, Lopatin supported Nine Inch Nails on their tour with Soundgarden, as a replacement for Death Grips. On October 4, 2014, he presented a world premiere live soundtrack for Kōji Morimoto's 1995 anime film Magnetic Rose. The event took place at the Jodrell Bank Centre for Astrophysics, and featured Anohni on a rendition of the OPN song "Returnal" as well as audio-visual works from Nate Boyce which have been hosted by the Barbican Centre in London, the Museum of Modern Art and MoMA PS1. In the same year, OPN released Commissions I for Record Store Day, featuring several commissioned pieces. He also contributed "Need" to the Bleep:10 compilation in celebration of the online retailer's 10th anniversary. This was followed by Commissions II in 2015.

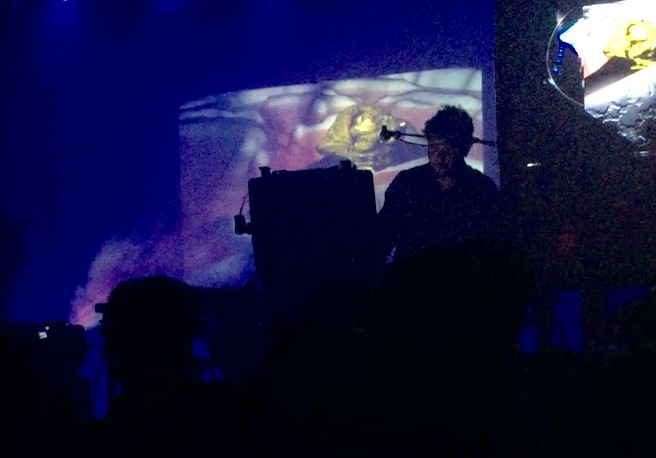
OPN performing in New York in 2016, with visuals by Nate Boyce

Lopatin released his second Warp LP Garden of Delete in November 2015 following an enigmatic promotional campaign. He also composed the score for the 2015 film Partisan, directed by Ariel Kleiman. In 2016, Lopatin contributed to British singer Anohni's 2016 album Hopelessness and 2017 EP Paradise as well as Chicago footwork producer DJ Earl's 2016 album Open Your Eyes. In Fall 2016, UCLA's Hammer Museum hosted the film series Ecco: The Videos of Oneohtrix Point Never and Related Works, dedicated to the visual work of Lopatin and his collaborators.

=== 2017–2022: Age Of and Magic Oneohtrix Point Never ===
In January 2017, a collaboration between OPN and FKA Twigs was used in a Nike ad. In 2017, OPN provided the soundtrack for the film Good Time, directed by Ben & Josh Safdie. He won the Soundtrack Award at the 2017 Cannes Film Festival for his work on the film, which included a collaboration with singer Iggy Pop entitled "The Pure and the Damned". The film's soundtrack was released via Warp on August 11, 2017.

On June 1, 2018, Lopatin released his eighth studio album Age Of on Warp. The album was accompanied by Myriad, an expansive conceptual live project dubbed a "concertscape" and "four-part epochal song cycle" and featuring collaborations with live musicians and the visual artists Daniel Swan, David Rudnick, and Nate Boyce; the project was premiered at the Park Avenue Armory in May 2018. Also in 2018, OPN collaborated with David Byrne on his LP American Utopia. In 2019, he composed the original score to the Safdie Brothers' 2019 feature film Uncut Gems.

In 2020, he collaborated with The Weeknd on the album After Hours, producing two and writing three of its songs. On September 25, he announced the release of his ninth album, titled Magic Oneohtrix Point Never, which was released on October 30, 2020, and accompanied by music videos and online mixtapes. Lopatin was the musical director for The Weeknd's band during the Super Bowl LV halftime show in February 2021. He again collaborated with The Weeknd on the album Dawn FM, released in January 2022, on which he wrote and produced 13 songs, as well as serving as executive producer alongside The Weeknd and Max Martin. OPN also performed with Abel on the Prime Video exclusive concert film, The Dawn FM Experience.

=== 2023–present: Again and Tranquilizer ===
In August 2023, he announced his tenth studio album, Again, which was released on September 29. In the same year, he was the executive producer for the score for the Benny Safdie and Nathan Fielder satirical comedy series The Curse with John Medeski.

In 2025, OPN again collaborated with The Weeknd on his album Hurry Up Tomorrow as a co-producer. Lopatin also co-scored the 2025 accompanying movie of the same name. Lopatin, along with Josh Safdie, composed the soundtrack to Safdie's 2025 feature film, Marty Supreme, the first film by Safdie since his creative split from his brother Benny Safdie.

In October 2025, he announced his eleventh studio album, Tranquilizer, which released on November 21. Alexis Petridis writing for The Guardian described the album as, "unlikely to help you calm down. It's too kaleidoscopic and restless, too crammed with sounds: an album that demands – and repays – your full attention, rather than simply drifting by".

== Style and approach ==
Lopatin's musical work has been described as recontextualizing sounds and styles from different eras, ranging from the "vintage synth oddities" of his early work "to the '90s TV commercial-sampling Replica and the alt-rock-inspired Garden of Delete", according to AllMusic's Heather Phares. Jon Pareles of The New York Times said that Lopatin has engaged with "a broad and deeply idiosyncratic array of genres, samples, sources and strategies, from minimalism to collage to noise", often using "snippets of material—ad jingles, saccharine pop productions, throwaway dialogue—that he can't entirely dismiss as kitsch". For Stereogum, Lindsey Rhoades described him as "almost more of a philosopher/sound-collagist than he is a musician", noting his tendency to "elevate sounds otherwise considered cheesy" and prompt reflection "about why you have aversions to certain tones and timbres, and why others immediately bring childhood impressions screaming back into your brain". Art theorists David Burrows and Simon O'Sullivan described Oneohtrix Point Never as a project of "productions that are less concrete and more affective in terms of the emotional resonances of music", highlighting the way "in which experience and the collapse of experience loop together [in Lopatin's music], forming circuits of refrains, samples, rhythms, submemetic vibrations and noise".

Lopatin has expressed disinterest in committing to one style or genre. In 2018, he began to use the term "Compressionism"—a riff on compressors, used by audio engineers—to describe what he referred to as "a historically motivated need to organize and make sense of an illogical flow of external media inputs", describing it as a process of "dealing with the overload of knowing about too much stuff, about being exposed to too many historical inputs, and then turning it into some kind of coherent jumble [...] It's still a jumble, but it's a kind of coherency of drawing connections between things". Lopatin has described his creative process as "trying to create these abstract forms that might be suggestive of the influences and inputs I'm getting". Lopatin has said that he began to observe "weird production" elements as a child, saying that he "love[d] the negative space of music so much".

=== Influences ===
Lopatin has credited early musical influences introduced to him by his family, including the jazz fusion groups Mahavishnu Orchestra and Return to Forever, "all the strange moments from Beatles songs", and soul musician Stevie Wonder, as well as later personal influences such as electronic composer Vangelis, hip hop producer DJ Premier, and shoegaze band My Bloody Valentine. In 2026, he described Enya as "one of my favorite artists ever". He has also cited literary influences, including Romanian philosopher Emil Cioran and science fiction authors Stanisław Lem and Philip K. Dick.

== Discography ==
=== Studio albums ===
- Betrayed in the Octagon (2007, Deception Island)
- Zones Without People (2009, Arbor)
- Russian Mind (2009, No Fun)
- Returnal (2010, Editions Mego)
- Replica (2011, Software)
- R Plus Seven (2013, Warp)
- Garden of Delete (2015, Warp)
- Age Of (2018, Warp)
- Magic Oneohtrix Point Never (2020, Warp)
- Again (2023, Warp)
- Tranquilizer (2025, Warp)

=== Compilation albums ===
- Rifts (2009, No Fun)
- Drawn and Quartered (2013, Software)
- The Fall into Time (2013, Software)

=== Soundtrack albums ===
- Good Time (2017, Warp)
- Uncut Gems (2019, Warp) as Daniel Lopatin
- Marty Supreme (2025, A24 Music) as Daniel Lopatin

== Awards and nominations ==
Year	Association	Category	Nominated work	Result	Ref.
2016	Berlin Music Video Awards	Most Bizarre	Sticky Drama	Nominated	
2018	AIM Independent Music Awards	Best Creative Packaging	Age Of	Nominated	
2019	Libera Awards	Best Dance/Electronic Record	Age Of	Nominated	
2019	Libera Awards	Best Outlier Record	Age Of	Nominated	
2021	Libera Awards	Best Outlier Record	Magic Oneohtrix Point Never	Nominated	
2021	Berlin Music Video Awards	Best Experimental	Lost But Never Alone	Nominated	
2025	Hollywood Music in Media Awards	Best Original Score in a Feature Film	Marty Supreme	Nominated	
2025	Washington D.C. Area Film Critics Association Awards	Best Score	Marty Supreme	Nominated	
2026	Critics' Choice Awards	Best Score	Marty Supreme	Nominated	
2026	Dorian Awards	Film Music of the Year	Marty Supreme	Pending	

== Bibliography ==
- Graham, Stephen (2016). Sounds of the Underground: A Cultural, Political and Aesthetic Mapping of Underground and Fringe Music. Ann Arbor, Michigan: University of Michigan Press. ISBN 978-0-472-11975-2.
- Whiteley, Sheila; Rambarran, Shara (2016). The Oxford Handbook of Music and Virtuality. Oxford: Oxford University Press. ISBN 978-0-19-932128-5.
