= Replica (Oneohtrix Point Never album) =

Studio album by Oneohtrix Point Never
- Released: November 8, 2011
- Studio: Mexican Summer Studios, Brooklyn, New York
- Genre: Electronic; sampledelia; ambient; plunderphonics
- Length: 40:54
- Label: Mexican Summer; Software
- Producer: Daniel Lopatin; Joel Ford; Al Carlson

Oneohtrix Point Never chronology
Chuck Person's Eccojams Vol. 1 (2010)	Replica (2011)	Music for Reliquary House (2012)

Replica is the fifth studio album by American electronic musician Daniel Lopatin under the stage name Oneohtrix Point Never, released on November 8, 2011, via Mexican Summer and Software. It features co-production by Joel Ford and Al Carlson, and was Lopatin's first work to be recorded in a studio. Stylistically, the album marks a shift away from Lopatin's previous synth-based works under the alias, instead showcasing a sample-based approach utilizing audio from 1980s and 1990s television advertisements.

Upon release, Replica received positive reviews from music critics and subsequently featured in the year-end lists of the best albums of 2011 by several publications, including The Boston Globe, Pitchfork, and Resident Advisor. The album peaked in the top 10 of the Billboard Top Dance/Electronic Albums and Heatseekers Albums charts.

== Background ==
In contrast to his previous synthesizer-based releases as Oneohtrix Point Never, Replica was produced around audio samples from television advertisements procured by Lopatin, with the ads mainly dating back to the 1980s and 1990s. He proceeded to isolate the audio from the commercials, listening for sounds that would strike him as being "harmonically intense" and sampling them. This approach built on his 2010 sample-based cassette release Chuck Person's Eccojams Vol. 1 under the alias Chuck Person. Lopatin described the album as having "as much to do with environmental, broadcasted, and club sounds as it does with more direct musical influences." Asked why he opted to use commercials as sample sources, Lopatin described his process as "looking for old things that are meaningful" then "restructuring and rearranging it to interfere with the original narrative and creating this new poetry." His production process involved opening several music players simultaneously to listen to several sounds in tandem, which he described as "raw listening and sketching". Lopatin focused particularly on "strange pauses and little incidental sounds" found in the commercials to use as samples.

Lopatin attributed the title to "the idea of the replica in culture as a way we deal with the decline of knowledge, or human knowledge going to waste because we're not immortal. But it's not a solution, it's just a way of coping with those mysteries... it's like an artistic attempt at conveying the original, and not a copy, so there's inherit failure to it." The cover for Replica is a 1936 illustration by Virgil Finlay from the pulp magazine Weird Tales, depicting a skeletal vampire looking at himself in a mirror. Lopatin felt that the image was an appropriate metaphor for the title and described it as "really morbid, but there's humor to it, too, because the skeleton's hair is pasta-like", which he called "a good approximation of how I deal with lots of depressing things—just put pasta hair on top and it's okay."

== Composition ==
Replica was Lopatin's first album to be completed in a formal studio setting, with recording sessions taking place at the complex owned by his label Mexican Summer. He conceived it as "an electronic song cycle" and, despite the lack of conventional singing on the album, aimed for the album's tracks "to feel like vignettes that are recognizable and hummable, instead of just letting things glide ambiently." Replica is more substantially sample-based than Lopatin's previous work, and it has been characterized by Miles Bowe of Stereogum as "chopped and screwed plunderphonics" and by Larry Fitzmaurice of The Fader as "skyward sampledelia." Exclaim!'s Mark E. Rich describes it as "a sharp left turn that has him indebted to early 2000s electronic visionaries like Matmos, Akufen and Matthew Herbert, utilizing a specific sample source across the record." The presence of rhythmic structures is more apparent in the album's songs, albeit through the use of sampled loops as opposed to conventional drum tracks and beats. In addition to the Roland Juno-60 synthesizer, which was prominently used on previous Oneohtrix Point Never albums, Lopatin and collaborators Al Carlson and Joel Ford utilized other digital instruments, including samplers such as the Roland SP-555 and Akai MPC and synthesizers such as the Roland D-50, Yamaha CS-01 and Spectrasonics Omnisphere.

Lopatin, Carlson, and Ford opted to keep Replica minimal in nature, and Lopatin noted that they "had a unwritten rule that we wouldn't get into more than 8 tracks per song". Jon Pareles of The New York Times identifies Lopatin's "preferred sounds" as sustained synthesizer chords and fragmented piano bits "that well up gradually, then ripple off into the distance." Jeff Siegel of Resident Advisor notes that "where many of his peers and forebears build their ambience from microscopic variations on the same few sounds, Lopatin doesn't settle for long", citing "Andro", where opening synthesizer swells eventually give way to a "drain-swirl of errant ticks and drums", and the "cut-up vocals" of "Remember". "Power of Persuasion" incorporates a shifting series of piano figures from an American Express commercial featuring Michel Legrand, and "Sleep Dealer" is built around several looped samples from a Wrigley's gum commercial, with repetition of the piece being tweaked from section to section. One of the album's more "percussive moments", "Child Soldier" incorporates "voices programmed into a martial cadence" juxtaposed with distorted samples and synthesizer sounds, and Carlson describes the song as "the thesis of the record; smooth meets agro."

== Release ==
On August 17, 2011, Daniel Lopatin announced that Replica would be released on November 8 via Software, the imprint operated by Lopatin and Joel Ford, and Mexican Summer, and revealed the album's cover and track listing. On September 17, Lopatin previewed material from the album at a show held at the Rhythm Factory in London. In the build-up leading to the release of Replica, Lopatin released three songs from the album: "Sleep Dealer" on September 7, "Replica" on October 12, and "Nassau" on October 28. In addition, Lopatin released the music video for "Replica", a self-made collage of cartoon footage, on October 17, and the video for "Sleep Dealer", directed by Inga Copeland and Dean Blunt, on October 31. The album was made available for streaming in its entirety on November 1. On November 8, Replica was made available for purchase in CD, LP, and digital download formats. It peaked at numbers ten and seven on the Billboard Top Dance/Electronic Albums and Heatseekers Albums charts, respectively, for the week ending November 26, 2011.

== Reception and legacy ==
Professional ratings
Aggregate scores
Source	Rating
AnyDecentMusic?	7.7/10
Metacritic	80/100
Review scores
Source	Rating
AllMusic	5/5 stars
The A.V. Club	B
The Guardian	3/5 stars
Mojo	4/5 stars
MSN Music (Expert Witness)	A−
NME	8/10
The Observer	4/5 stars
Pitchfork	8.8/10
Spin	8/10
XLR8R	9/10

Replica received generally positive reviews from critics. At Metacritic, which assigns a normalized rating out of 100 to reviews from mainstream publications, the album received an average score of 80, based on 32 reviews. Mark Richardson of Pitchfork found "a real sense of discovery here, or possibilities being probed" and wrote that "what's most striking about Replica is how well-constructed these tracks are, which is especially impressive given the record's brevity". John Doran of NME acknowledged that "the theory side of what he does is interesting, but above and beyond that he continues to herald the next stage of analogue future psychedelia beyond Boards of Canada's Music Has the Right to Children." The A.V. Club's Christian Williams wrote that "its great strength and most beguiling feature is its ability to sand spiky textures down into soothing ones, and to transform the anodyne into the anxiety-inducing, simply through repetition." Spin's Philip Sherburne called Replica "both lyrical and hypnotic" and "a deeply romantic testament to the possibilities of life in the Cloud."

Phil Mongredien, writing in The Observer, called Replica "an ambitious electronic song cycle" that "rewards repeated listening". K. Ross Hoffman of AllMusic stated that though the album's reliance on samples of commercials "makes for an intriguing compositional back-story—and it clearly provided him a rich sound palette from which to draw—it's rare that that source material is specifically evident while listening; at best it functions on a more energetic, subconscious level." Robert Christgau, in his "Consumer Guide" column for MSN Music, commended Lopatin's "taste for content as well as form and for creation as well as contrarianism". Dave Simpson of The Guardian stated that "if Replica occasionally drifts – literally – too close to the whiffy bongs and flotation tanks of 90s chillout, it's never predictable, and is best experienced in a continuous sitting".

=== Accolades ===
Replica appeared in several publications' year-end lists of the best albums of 2011. The Boston Globe critic Michael Brodeur named it the year's best record and praised it as a "whole new way to understand ambient". The album also placed in the year-end lists of publications such as Clash, Consequence of Sound, Exclaim!, Fact, Pitchfork, The Quietus, Resident Advisor, Stereogum, The Wire, and XLR8R. Replica placed at number 35 on The Village Voice's year-end Pazz & Jop critics' poll. Pitchfork later included it at number 49 on their list of the 100 best albums of 2010–14. Spin magazine ranked it number 235 on their list of "The 300 Best Albums of the Past 30 Years (1985–2014)". In 2016, it was ranked at number 20 on Pitchfork's list of the 50 best ambient albums of all time.

Publication/Author	Accolade	Rank
Clash	The Top 40 Albums of 2011	21
Consequence of Sound	Top 50 Albums of 2011	38
Exclaim!	20 Best Dance & Electronic Albums of 2011	4
Fact	The 50 Best Albums of 2011	22
Pitchfork	Top 50 Albums of 2011	6
Pitchfork	The 100 Best Albums of the Decade So Far (2010–14)	49
Pitchfork	The 50 Best Ambient Albums of All Time	20
Pitchfork	The 200 Best Albums of the 2010s	49
The Quietus	Albums of the Year 2011	19
Resident Advisor	Top 20 Albums of 2011	9
Spin	The 300 Best Albums of the Past 30 Years (1985–2014)	235
Stereogum	Top 50 Albums of 2011	17
The Village Voice	Pazz and Jop 2011	35
XLR8R	Best Releases of 2011	8
The Wire	2011 Rewind	14

== Track listing ==
All music is composed by Daniel Lopatin.

No.	Title	Length
1.	"Andro"	3:56
2.	"Power of Persuasion"	3:30
3.	"Sleep Dealer"	3:10
4.	"Remember"	3:19
5.	"Replica"	4:36
6.	"Nassau"	4:43
7.	"Submersible"	3:49
8.	"Up"	3:57
9.	"Child Soldier"	3:12
10.	"Explain"	6:45
Total length:		40:54

== Personnel ==
Credits for Replica adapted from album liner notes.

- Daniel Lopatin – music, production
- Al Carlson – production
- Jesper Eklow – layout
- Virgil Finlay – cover art
- Joel Ford – production
- Joe Lambert – mastering
- Theres Wegmann – layout

== See also ==
- Sampling (music)
- 2011 in music
- Sound collage

== Charts ==
Chart (2013)	Peak position
US Heatseekers Albums (Billboard)	7
US Top Dance Albums (Billboard)	10
