= Garden of Delete =

Studio album by Oneohtrix Point Never
- Released: November 13, 2015
- Recorded: January–July 2015; Brooklyn, New York
- Genre: Electronic; experimental; nu metal
- Length: 45:16
- Label: Warp
- Producer: Daniel Lopatin; Paul Corley

Oneohtrix Point Never chronology
R Plus Seven (2013)	Garden of Delete (2015)	Good Time (2017)

Singles from Garden of Delete
- 1. "I Bite Through It" Released: September 3, 2015; 2. "Mutant Standard" Released: October 21, 2015; 3. "Sticky Drama" Released: November 4, 2015

Garden of Delete is the seventh studio album by American electronic musician Oneohtrix Point Never, released on November 13, 2015 on Warp Records. The album was preceded by an enigmatic Internet-based promotional campaign, and draws on musical influences such as grunge music, nu metal, and popular electronic dance music, as well as themes of adolescence, mutation and abjection. It received generally positive critical reception and was included on year-end lists by several publications, including PopMatters, Fact and The Quietus.

== Background and recording ==
Following the release of his 2013 debut on Warp, R Plus Seven, Daniel Lopatin was invited to support the American alternative rock bands Nine Inch Nails and Soundgarden on their 2014 joint amphitheater tour as a replacement for the American group Death Grips after they had unexpectedly announced their disbandment. With the approval of Nine Inch Nails' frontman Trent Reznor and Soundgarden's guitarist Kim Thayil, Lopatin performed half-hour opening sets of self-described "cyberdrone" to surprised and vexed arena rock crowds. The tour prompted him to revisit the grunge music of his teenage years, evoking his memories of adolescence and puberty, which he described as "pretty traumatic".

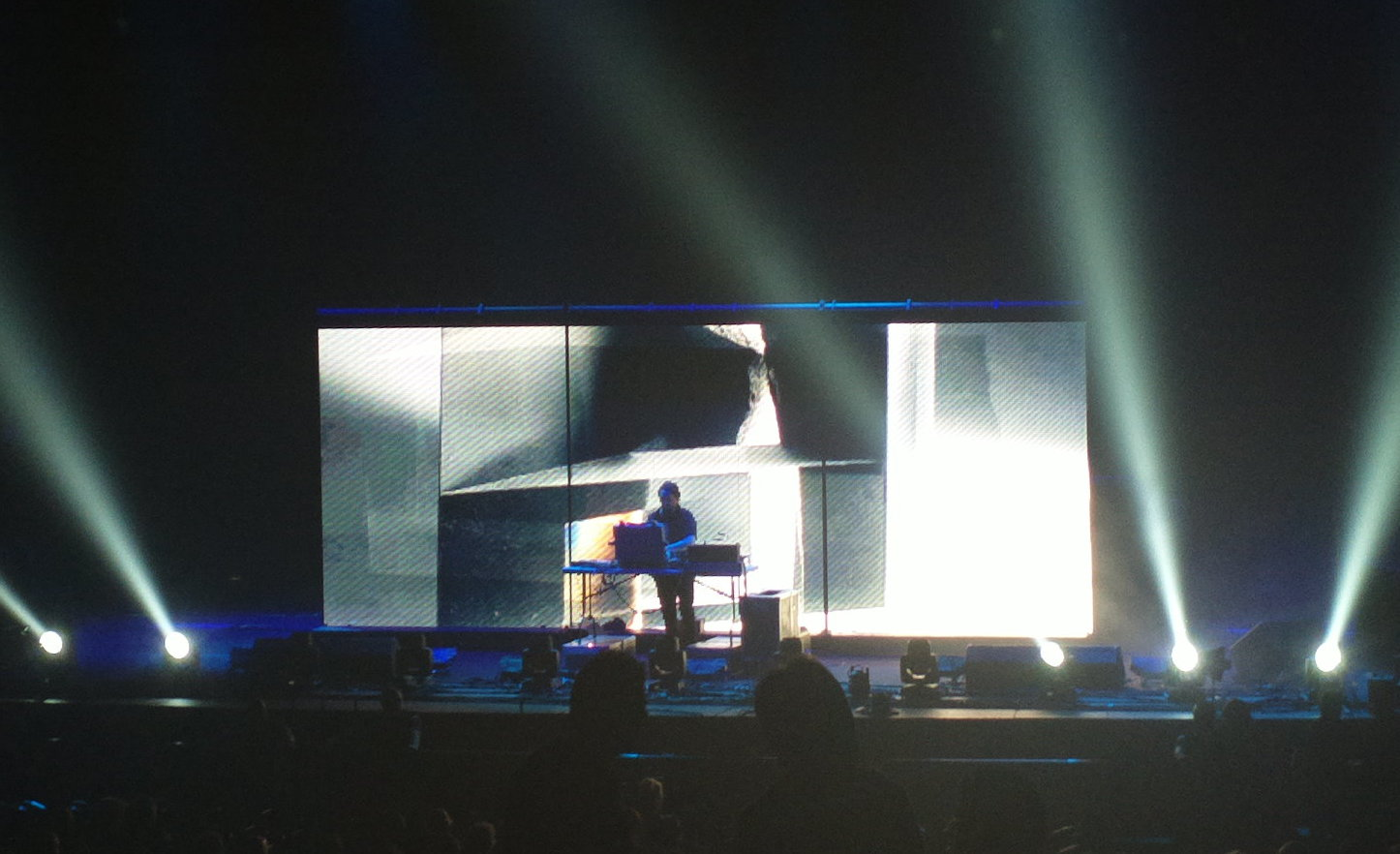
OPN opening for Nine Inch Nails and Soundgarden on their 2014 arena tour

After completing the tour and returning to Brooklyn, Lopatin rented a small, windowless basement studio and began working on sketches for an album. Wanting to experiment with pop music, he initially conceived Garden of Delete in its untitled form as a project incorporating and manipulating samples of unheard vocal outtakes from singers such as Justin Bieber and Taylor Swift, which he speculated as being "cold-cut ends" and "dollar-fifty-a-pound bullshit". Unable to contact any managers, he chose to "just pretend to be them", and the initial concept was mostly discarded in favor of new themes of "dealing with puberty and how your pubescent body is essentially the staging area for all this mutation". The project's main inspirations included the style of curation on the pop music video hosting service Vevo, satellite radio stations oriented around heavy metal such as Ozzy's Boneyard and Lithium, and the critical theory of the French philosopher Julia Kristeva, in particular her influential 1980 work Powers of Horror. In his own summary of the latter, Lopatin explained that

[Kristeva] talks about the abject things that come out that we have desire to see. So the things that we try to contain within us is like this pre-semiotic reality and society is the way we want to present ourselves [...] And yet, when the stuff comes out — like, you sneeze and you kind of want to look at the napkin for a second [...] So I started thinking, that's a good formal constraint, like how do I kind of vaguely represent things that leak or things that are kind of disgusting but still seductive?

Lopatin was additionally inspired by an exhibition by the American visual artist and earlier collaborator Jacob Ciocci, featuring a virtual Max/MSP instrument which sporadically played minuscule clips from a multitude of amateur metal drummers sourced from YouTube. He aimed to orient his new music around drums, as his work had previously focused solely on melodies. The isolated recording environment equally encouraged an abrasive and dense sound compared with his earlier work, with Lopatin saying that he "was making pretty aggressive, nihilistic stuff early on and kind of went away from that for a bit. In some ways I feel like I'm back now."

== Composition ==
In interviews during and after the promotional campaign of Garden of Delete, Lopatin stated that his intentions were to "make a hyperactive/depressive record" and "conflate really aggressive music with sugary pop progressions". In addition to the "cool, frictionless pads, airy choral presets, and [...] synthesized sounds" that characterized R Plus Seven, the album variously draws inspiration from metal, top 40 radio, industrial, alternative rock and music from the scene and rave subcultures. The album prominently incorporates digital simulations of guitars like the Chapman Stick and electric guitars played with shredding techniques. It is the first Oneohtrix Point Never album with vocals and lyrics, rendered using the software instrument Chipspeech which allowed Lopatin to write abstract phrases and vocalize them chromatically. Sasha Geffen of Consequence of Sound noted nonetheless that "you only catch them in snippets inside the grotesque mesh of processing Lopatin's used to filter them". The Fader wrote that "the record, a meticulous collage of mutilated samples and computer-generated voices, careens between uncanny familiarity and total alienness". The album was accompanied by a lyric sheet in its booklet on CD and inner gatefold on vinyl.

Writing for Thump, Emilie Freelander described Garden of Delete as "a guided tour through the producer's own psychological and physical experience of adolescence—filtered through the prism of his free-wheeling and future-gazing production style", writing that "there's beat programming that sounds like heavy metal drum fills on steroids; voices pushed to demonic, pitched extremes; testosterone-fueled guitar licks worthy of Slash himself". Heather Phares of AllMusic wrote that Lopatin "uses his music's porous boundaries brilliantly, whether he's fusing molten R&B with death metal's growls and rapid-fire kick drums on the standout "Sticky Drama", crafting dizzying juxtapositions and edits on "I Bite Through It"'s violent melancholy, or naming one of the album's most beautiful ambient pop moments after the child abuse documentary Child of Rage". Scott Wilson of Fact nostalgically described the album's sound palette as being "full of lurid electronic presets that sound like a guitar blasting out of a wall of amplifiers and palm-muted note runs that sound like painstakingly sequenced MIDI, a grotesque, sinewy collection of sounds that evokes the intertwined sensation of curiosity and disgust I felt browsing the horror section of my local video rental store as a child in the early 1990s".

== Promotional campaign ==
The release of Garden of Delete was preceded by an Internet promotional campaign and alternate reality game (ARG), which critics described as enigmatic and surreal, devised by Lopatin in collaboration with friends. The album was initially announced in August 2015 via a series of online posts originating from Lopatin's website, including a cryptic PDF letter to his fans serving as an introduction to the ARG, which were gradually followed by further material. The project sketched out a loose fictional backstory involving Lopatin himself, an acne-ridden teenage alien blogger named Ezra, and an imaginary "hypergrunge" band from the 1990s called Kaoss Edge. The websites in the ARG included Ezra's supposed 1990s blog and Kaoss Edge's "official" website, as well as fabricated interviews, characterized Twitter accounts and teaser videos. Kaoss Edge's main website contained a repository of MIDI files (many of which were stems from the album), along with a detailed band biography, subpages with fictional elaborations on the band and a fictional discography, all of which contained hyperlinks to web pages for unaffiliated entities and other obscure information scattered around the site to convey a disorienting Web 1.0 environment.

Lopatin described the campaign as an attempt to "create a world where I can put into motion vague, interesting ideas, and see how they interact with each other", clarifying that "it's not deeply plotted out, more of an ongoing experiment with the concepts floating around in my head". Philip Sherburne of Pitchfork wrote that "the loose, extra-musical narrative developed across a range of apocrypha that orbit the album [...] may all seem, from the outside, like so much masturbatory energy spillage, but dig deep enough, and they all become part of the larger work". The Quietus described the campaign as being more "like getting caught up in some late-night YouTube, Wikipedia rabbit hole of conspiracy theories and ill-advised medical self-diagnoses than a press release for an album, encouraging full submersion in something that was neither fact or fiction but had the quality of being somehow vital and totally necessary at that moment".

The album's first single, "I Bite Through It", was released on September 3, 2015 and was followed later that month with users unlocking the Kaoss Edge site which had been hinted at on Ezra's blog, with Lopatin encouraging fans to create their own songs from the site's MIDI files. The second single, "Mutant Standard", was released on October 21. "Sticky Drama" was released on November 4, and accompanied by a two-part music video directed by Jon Rafman. Finally, in October 2016, Lopatin premiered a music video for "Animals" directed by Rick Alverson and starring Val Kilmer at UCLA's Hammer Museum exhibition "Ecco: The Videos of Oneohtrix Point Never and Related Works".

== Critical reception ==
Professional ratings
Aggregate scores
Source	Rating
AnyDecentMusic?	7.8/10
Metacritic	79/100
Review scores
Source	Rating
AllMusic	4/5 stars
Consequence of Sound	A−
Exclaim!	9/10
The Guardian	3/5 stars
Mojo	3/5 stars
Pitchfork	8.7/10
Q	4/5 stars
Rolling Stone	4/5 stars
Spin	8/10
Vice	A−

Garden of Delete received generally positive reviews from critics, generally describing it as a radical stylistic change from his previous releases. AllMusic's Heather Phares called the album "some of Lopatin's most intellectually engaging music as well as some of his funniest, darkest, and most cathartic". Writing for Pitchfork, Philip Sherburne described the album as "absolutely gripping—strange, moving, hilarious, sometimes pushing the limits of good taste" adding that "this time out, [Lopatin] ventures even deeper into the uncanny valley separating "real" sounds from mimetic ones". In a positive review, the UK magazine The Skinny described Garden of Delete in contrast to Oneohtrix Point Never's previous work as a "seemingly aggressive record; muscular in tone, schizophrenic in delivery, all the while possessing a maniacal grin on its face", calling it "Oneohtrix’s anti-ambient record". Kyle Carney of Exclaim! wrote that the record manages to sound accessible despite its complexities, calling it "a sound collage like no other". Under the Radar called it "a complex beast of shade and mood, and [...] Lopatin's best work yet".

Writing for Consequence, Sasha Geffen called the album "OPN's most emotional work to date and also his most ridiculous", writing that "[i]ts tragedy is bound up with its humor; its sublimity comes from the places where it feels the most broken." Uncut wrote that the album "ultimately dissolves into a beautifully arranged and slightly sickly morass of curdled pop tropes, out of which spurt a bodacious riff or glossy rave arpeggio" and thought that "oddly no-one does this better". John Garratt of PopMatters described the record as "another adventure watching your own sense of subjectivity drown in a pool of confusion". For The Line of Best Fit, Jennifer Johnson wrote, "GOD isn't about sensory pleasure. It's about sensory gluttony, auditory overload, and revelling in the difficulty of its pacing." She concluded, "It isn't so much an album as a junk shop: that proverbial collection of oddities whose perceived value reflects more about the patron than it does the owner who placed them there." In a mixed review, The Guardian's Paul McInnes wrote, "Lopatin is never quite able to stand still and enjoy some of the sounds he creates. This remains a project for only a very particular kind of pop picker." In another mixed review, Joseph Burnett in Dusted magazine wrote that "at its best, you can get lost inside Garden of Delete's rabbit hole of different directions and unexpected asides, but at other times it's easy to feel shut-out, as if you're looking in at someone's intellectual ADHD, but he's steadfastly refusing to meet your gaze."

=== Accolades ===
Garden of Delete was included as one of the year's best albums by a variety of publications.

Publication	Accolade	Rank
Dummy	The 30 Best Albums of 2015	1
Fact	The 50 Best Albums of 2015	2
Pitchfork	Top 50 Albums of the Year (2015)	11
PopMatters	The 80 Best Albums of 2015	7
Spin	The 20 Best Avant Albums of 2015	2
Stereogum	The 50 Best Albums of 2015	49
The Quietus	The Quietus Albums of 2015	8
The Wire	Top 50 Releases of 2015	18

== Track listing ==
All tracks are written by Daniel Lopatin, except where noted.

No.	Title	Composer	Length
1.	"Intro"		0:27
2.	"Ezra"		4:26
3.	"ECCOJAMC1"	Daniel Lopatin; John Martyn	0:32
4.	"Sticky Drama"		4:17
5.	"SDFK"	Lopatin; Grotus; John Luther Adams	1:27
6.	"Mutant Standard"		8:06
7.	"Child of Rage"	Lopatin; Michael Finnissy	4:52
8.	"Animals"		3:54
9.	"I Bite Through It"		3:17
10.	"Freaky Eyes"	Lopatin; Roger Rodier	6:31
11.	"Lift"		4:09
12.	"No Good"	Lopatin; Hans Reichel	3:18
Total length:			45:16

Japanese edition bonus track
No.	Title	Length
13.	"The Knuckleheads"	3:48
Total length:		49:04

Sample credits

- "ECCOJAMC1" contains a sample of "Solid Air" by John Martyn.
- "SDFK" contains samples of "Brown" by Grotus and "Dream in White on White" by John Luther Adams.
- "Child of Rage" contains samples of "My Love Is Like a Red Red Rose" by Michael Finnissy, "Cruel When Complete" by Dome and the documentary Child of Rage: A Story of Abuse.
- "Freaky Eyes" contains a sample of "Am I Supposed to Let It by Again (Above the Covers)" by Roger Rodier.
- "No Good" contains a sample of "Return of the Knödler Show" by Hans Reichel.

== Personnel ==
Credits adapted from AllMusic.

- Daniel Lopatin – producer, artwork
- Paul Corley – mixing, additional production
- Dave Kutch – mastering
- Sebastian Krüger – photography
- Andrew Stasser – design
- Beau Thomas – vinyl cut

== Charts ==
Chart (2015)	Peak position
Belgian Albums (Ultratop Flanders)	95
Belgian Albums (Ultratop Wallonia)	199
Japanese Albums (Oricon)	108
UK Albums (OCC)	149
UK Record Store Albums (Official Record Store Chart)	19
US Heatseekers Albums (Billboard)	2
US Independent Albums (Billboard)	14
US Top Dance Albums (Billboard)	2
