= Rabbit Run =

Rabbit Run may refer to:

- A rabbit warren or rabbit hutch

== Media ==
- Rabbit, Run, a 1960 novel by John Updike
- Rabbit, Run (film), a 1970 American independent film based on the Updike novel
- "Rabbit Run", a song by Eminem from 8 Mile: Music from and Inspired by the Motion Picture

== Rivers ==
=== Indiana ===
- Rabbit Run (Doe Creek), a tributary of Doe Creek in Putnam County

=== Montana ===
- Rabbit Run (Marten Creek), at tributary of Marten Creek in Sanders County

=== Nebraska ===
- Rabbit Run Creek (Little Blue River), a tributary of the Little Blue River in Adams County

=== Ohio ===
- Rabbit Run (Turkey Creek), a tributary of Turkey Creek in Scioto County

=== Pennsylvania ===
- Rabbit Run (Delaware River), a tributary of the Delaware River in Bucks County

== See also ==
- Run Rabbit Run (disambiguation)
- Run Rabbit
