= Patrick Wimberly =

American musician (born 1983)

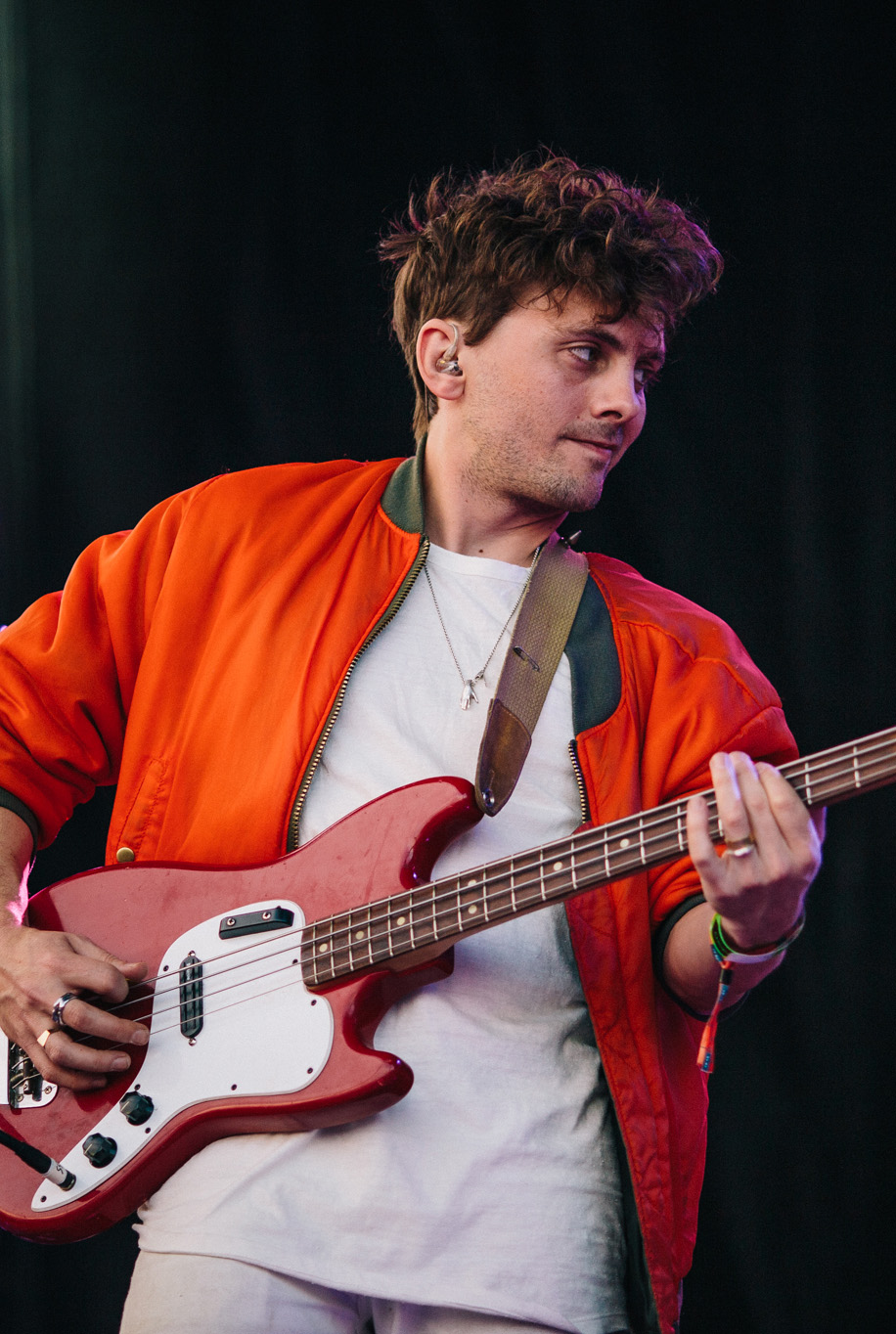
- Wimberly performing at Treefort Music Fest in March 2016

Background information
- Born: Jonathan Patrick Wimberly; May 29, 1983 (age 43); Nashville, Tennessee, U.S.
- Genres: Indie pop; electronic
- Occupations: Musician; songwriter; record producer
- Instruments: Drums; bass guitar; keyboard
- Years active: 2005–present
- Labels: Kanine; Columbia
- Formerly of: Chairlift
- Website: chairlifted.com

Jonathan Patrick Wimberly (born May 29, 1983) is an American record producer, songwriter, multi-instrumentalist, composer and mixing engineer best known as being one-half of the synth-pop duo Chairlift. The band parted ways in 2017 so Wimberly and former bandmate Caroline Polachek could focus on their careers as producers/songwriters.

Wimberly has worked on Grammy-winning albums such as Beyoncé's self-titled album and A Seat at the Table by Solange, both of which topped the Billboard charts, and produced Joji's five-times Platinum-certified song "Slow Dancing In The Dark", as well as MGMT's album Little Dark Age and Lil Yachty's fifth studio album Let's Start Here. He also has writing and production credits on critically lauded albums by Blood Orange, Ellie Goulding, Paloma Faith, Empress Of, Wet, and many others. In addition, Wimberly has scored for both film and television, with an example being High Maintenance on HBO.

== Career ==
=== Producing ===
Wimberly has been actively producing records since 2010. Since the disbandment of Chairlift in 2017, he has spent the majority of his time producing records and collaborating with different artists. In 2018, he produced MGMT's fourth record Little Dark Age. Public Access T.V.'s February 2018 release Street Safari was also produced by him. This record was produced at his studio in Brooklyn. Wimberly produced the single "Sweet Sound of Ignorance" by Soko, French-born and LA-based singer-songwriter and musician, which came out in 2017.

Wimberly has also worked with Solange, Beyoncé, and Dev Hynes. He was a collaborator with Solange from 2011, and produced several tracks on her 2016 album A Seat at the Table, which reached number 1 on the Billboard 200. Wimberly produced "No Angel" with Caroline Polachek, which was featured on Beyoncé's self-titled album in 2013, which also was a number 1 record on the Billboard charts. In 2016, Wimberly worked with Dev Hynes of Blood Orange in which he produced, composed, and performed on several tracks. During the same year, he also worked with Wet to produce their debut record Don't You. Chairlift released their third album during this time, which Wimberly had a prominent role in producing with Polachek. Kelsey Lu co-produced her live EP Church with Wimberly in 2016.

Wimberly produced the Das Racist album Relax, also recording and mixing, and produced Acrylics' album Lives and Treasure. Both were 2011 releases. Latin singer Tecla released We Are The Lucky Ones in 2013, which Wimberly produced.

=== Chairlift ===
Originally from Nashville, Tennessee, Wimberly met bandmate Caroline Polachek at the University of Colorado Boulder in 2004. After moving to New York City in 2006, Wimberly and Polachek formed Chairlift in early 2007 with Aaron Pfenning.

In 2008, Wimberly went on tour with Chairlift to open for the experimental indie rockers Ariel Pink's Haunted Graffiti. Shortly thereafter, Chairlift's song "Bruises" was featured in the September 2008 commercial for the iPod nano, becoming their most widely known and breakout single following the release of their debut album Does You Inspire You.

Following Does You Inspire You, Wimberly worked on Chairlift's 2012 album Something (Chairlift album). The album features singles "Amanaemonesia" (2011), "Met Before" (2012), and "I Belong In Your Arms" (2012)

In January 2016, Chairlift released their third and final album, Moth.

=== Collaborations ===
Wimberly has collaborated on many records and television series, including with MGMT on their fourth LP, Little Dark Age. Public Access T.V. also enlisted Wimberly to produce their sophomore LP Street Safari. His television contributions include composing music for the HBO series High Maintenance on the "Globo" episode.

Some of Wimberly's most notable collaborations include working with Beyoncé on her self-titled surprise album Beyoncé on the track "No Angel." Beyoncé debuted at number one on the Billboard 200 Wimberly procured this opportunity being a part of Solange's band, in which he was also a part of her 2016 LP A Seat at the Table. Among his other collaborations that year were work with Dev Hynes (Blood Orange) on his album Freetown Sound, where Wimberly played drums, percussion, and bass on the song "Desirée." He worked on Wet's second album Don't You (Wet album) as well. In 2014, he mixed Arcadia, the debut album of Caroline Polachek's side project Ramona Lisa. Within the same period of time, he also mixed Tune-Yards album Nikki Nack and worked with Kelela and Tink on their song "Want It."

Wimberly's collaborations reach across a spectrum of artists and genres, including working with Fort Lean on their 2012 Change Your Name EP. During this time, he also worked with Latin singer, Tecla, in which he composed, produced, and performed on the record We Are The Lucky Ones. Das Racist also employed him during this period, having him collaborate on their album Relax.

More recently, he gained recognition for producing Joji's song "Slow Dancing in the Dark" (which was certified five-times Platinum in November 2022) and his subsequent album Nectar. He also worked on critically acclaimed albums by MGMT, Ellie Goulding, Paloma Faith, and James Vincent McMorrow, and Let's Start Here by Lil Yachty.

== Television appearances ==
Wimberly has had multiple television appearances. In 2016, he appeared on Saturday Night Live with Solange performing "Cranes in The Sky" and "Don't Touch My Hair." This was not the first time he has appeared live with Solange, as he played alongside her on December 10, 2012, on Late Night With Jimmy Fallon performing "Losing You," her lead single, off her True EP. In 2013, he appeared on Last Call with Carson Daly, with fellow Chairlift band member Caroline Polachek performing "Amanaemonesia". His first appearance on television with Chairlift, was on The Late Late Show With Craig Ferguson playing their breakout single "Bruises" off their first LP. Other notable television performances, include playing drums with Das Racist on November 28, 2011, playing their hit "Michael Jackson" on The Tonight Show with Conan O'Brien.

== Discography ==
=== Albums / EPs ===
Release date	Artist	Album / EP	Label	Charts
June 2007	Patrick Wimberly	Daylight Savings EP	self released	-
September 11, 2008	Chairlift	Does You Inspire You	Kanine Records	-
January 24, 2012	Chairlift	Something	Columbia Records / Young Turks	US: No. 184 UK: No. 131
January 22, 2016	Chairlift	Moth	Columbia Records	-

=== Singles ===
Year	Artist	Title	Record label	Charts
2007	Chairlift	Evident Utensil	Kanine Records	
2008	Chairlift	Bruises	Kanine Records	US: No. 101 UK: No. 50
2011	Chairlift	Sidewalk Safari	Kanine Records	
2011	Chairlift	Amanaemonesia	Kanine Records	
2012	Chairlift	Met Before	Kanine Records	
2012	Chairlift	I Belong In Your Arms	Kanine Records	
2012	Chairlift	I Belong In Your Arms (Japanese Version)	Kanine Records	
2015	Chairlift	Ch-Ching	Columbia Records	
2015	Chairlift	Romeo	Columbia Records	
2016	Chairlift	Crying In Public	Columbia Records	
2016	Chairlift	Moth to the Flame	Columbia Records	
2016	Chairlift	Get Real	Columbia Records	

=== Mixing credits ===
Year	Artist	Album / EP	Title
2010	Empress Of	-	Hat Trick
2010	Ramona Lisa	Arcadia	-
2011	Das Racist	Relax	-
2013	Empress Of	-	Realize You
2014	Kool A.D.	Word O.K.	-
2015	Kelela	-	Want It (feat. DJ Dahi & Tink)
2015	Tune-Yards	nikki nack	Sink-O
2015	Tei Shi	Verde EP	-
2016	Fort Lean	Quiet Day	Might've Misheard
2016	Kelsey Lu	Church EP	Dreams
2017	Confidence Man	Confident Music for Confident People	Bubblegum
2017	The Life	The Seventeen EP	
2018	Kevin Krauter	Toss Up	Keep Falling In Love
2018	Joji	BALLADS 1	Slow Dancing In The Dark
2019	Buscabulla	-	Vamano
2020	Buscabulla	-	NTE

=== Production / Writing credits ===
Year	Artist	Album	Title	Credit	RIAA
2008	Chairlift	Does You Inspire You	-	Producer / Writer	
2010	Das Racist	Sit Down, Man	-		
2011	Acrylics	-	Asian Pear		
2012	Das Racist	Relax	Relax	Executive Producer	
2012	Das Racist	Relax	Michael Jackson	Executive Producer	
2012	Das Racist	Relax	Brand New Dance	Executive Producer	
2012	Das Racist	Relax	Booty in the Air	Executive Producer	
2012	Das Racist	Relax	Selena	Executive Producer	
2012	Fort Lean	Change Your Name EP		Producer	
2012	Chairlift	Something	-	Co-prod / Writer	
2013	Beyonce	Beyonce	No Angel	Co-Prod	Album: 5× Platinum
2014	Kelela	-	Want It (feat. DJ Dahi & Tink)		
2016	Chairlift	Moth	-	Co-prod / Writer	
2016	Wet	Don't You	Weak	Co-Prod / Writer	
2016	Wet	Don't You	Island	Co-Prod / Writer	
2016	Wet	Don't You	Body	Co-Prod / Writer	
2016	Wet	Don't You	These Days	Co-Prod / Writer	
2016	Blood Orange	Freetown Sound	Desiree	Writer	
2016	Kelsey Lu	Church EP	Dreams		
2016	Jade De LaFleur	-	Shotgun	Producer / Writer	
2016	Solange	A Seat at the Table	Interlude: Tina Taught Me	Co-Prod / Writer	Album: Gold
2016	Solange	A Seat at the Table	Don't Touch My Hair (feat. Sampha)	Co-Prod / Writer	Album: Gold
2016	Solange	A Seat at the Table	Where Do We Go	Co-Prod / Writer	Album: Gold
2016	Solange	A Seat at the Table	Scales (feat. Kelela)	Co-Prod / Writer	Album: Gold
2017	Soko		Sweet Sound of Ignorance	Producer	
2018	The Dawn of MAY	Phantom	-	Producer	
2018	MGMT	Little Dark Age	Full Album	Producer	
2018	Public Access T.V.	Street Safari		Producer / Writer	
2018	Blanche	-	Wrong Turn	Producer	
2018	Joji	BALLADS 1	Slow Dancing In The Dark	Producer / Writer	Single: 5× Platinum Album: Platinum
2019	Hobo Johnson	The Fall of Hobo Johnson	Mover Awayer	Addt'l Prod	
2019	Anna of the North	Dream Girl	Dream Girl	Producer	
2019	Anna of the North	Dream Girl	My Love	Producer	
2019	Anna of the North	Dream Girl	Lonely Life	Producer	
2019	Anna of the North	Dream Girl	When R U Coming Home	Producer	
2019	Quinn XCII	From Michigan With Love	Life Must Go On	Producer	
2019	Buscabulla	-	Vamano	Addt'l Prod	
2020	Buscabulla	-	NTE	Addt'l Prod	
2020	Soko	Feel Feelings	Being Sad Is Not A Crime	Producer	
2020	Soko	Feel Feelings	Are You A Magician?	Producer	
2020	Soko	Feel Feelings	Blasphemie	Producer	
2020	Soko	Feel Feelings	Oh, To Be A Rainbow!	Producer	
2020	Soko	Feel Feelings	Quiet Storm	Producer	
2020	Soko	Feel Feelings	Replaceable Heads	Producer	
2020	Soko	Feel Feelings	Let Me Adore You	Producer	
2020	Soko	Feel Feelings	Time Waits For No One	Producer	
2020	Soko	Feel Feelings	Hurt Me With Your Ego	Producer	
2020	James Vincent McMorrow	Grapefruit Season	Headlights	Producer	
2020	Ellie Goulding	Brightest Blue	New Heights	Writer / Producer	
2020	Ellie Goulding	Brightest Blue	Bleach	Producer	
2020	Joji	Nectar	Pretty Boy	Writer / Producer	
2023	Lil Yachty	Let's Start Here	Full Album	Producer, Executive Producer	
2023	Totally Enormous Extinct Dinosaurs	When the Lights Go	The Sleeper	Producer, Writer	
2024	Kid Cudi	INSANO	Funky Wizard Smoke	Writer / Producer	
2024	Papooz	Resonate	Full Album	Mixer / Producer	
2024	MGMT	Loss of Life	Full Album	Producer, Executive Producer	

=== Remixes ===
Year	Artist	Title	Label
2011	TV On The Radio	Caffeinated Consciousness (Das Racist/patrickWhat remix)	Interscope
2011	The One AM Radio	Sunlight (patrickWhat remix)	Dangerbird Records
2013	Nite Jewel	One Second Love (patrickWhat remix)	Secretly Canadian
2015	R.W. Grace	Pluto (Patrick Wimberly Remix)	Liberation Music
2015	Brous	The Sound (Patrick Wimberly Remix)	-

=== Composer credits ===
Air date	Network	Title	Episode
January 19, 2018	HBO	High Maintenance	S02E01 "Globo"
