= Evolution Festival =

Music festival in Tyne and Wear, England

- Genre: Rock, indie, electronic
- Dates: May Bank Holiday 2002–2011 and 2013; Diamond Jubilee Bank Holiday 2012
- Locations: Newcastle upon Tyne and Gateshead, England
- Years active: 2002–2013
- Website: www.evolutionfestival.co.uk

Evolution Festival was a music festival held annually across Newcastle upon Tyne and Gateshead, England, from 2002 until 2013. The festival attracted tens of thousands of attendees every year and usually took place on the Quayside. Evolution Festival was briefly titled Orange Evolution due to a sponsorship deal with the mobile phone company Orange. It has been described as "the biggest festival Tyneside has ever staged".

Headline performers at Evolution Festival included Dizzee Rascal, The Wombats, Paolo Nutini and Maxïmo Park. Florence + The Machine, Amy Winehouse and Ellie Goulding all appeared at Evolution before the height of their fame.

In 2014 Evolution Festival did not take place, and although the organisers claimed it was only a "pause" the event has not been held since. A smaller event featuring local bands, Evolution Emerging, was held up until 2019, when it rebranded into Tipping Point live.

== History ==
Evolution Festival started in 2002. In 2003 the event took place on the Quayside for the first time, with performances from Moloko, Biffy Clyro and Inspiral Carpets. In 2004, due to funding restrictions, Evolution returned to its multi-venue format including a Shindig event headlined by Eric Morillo and Deep Dish. Evolution returned to the Quayside in 2005, sponsored by the mobile phone network Orange and featuring a three-stage event headlined by Dizzee Rascal and The Futureheads. Major Tyneside export Maxïmo Park headlined the 2007 event. In 2008, the festival ended its sponsorship with Orange and became known as Evolution Festival, and introduced an entry charge - of £3 - for the first time.

In 2009 the festival became a two-day event with performances from The Wombats, White Lies and Florence + The Machine. A folk stage was added in 2010. In 2012 the organisers of Evolution held a one-off edition of the festival at Avenham Park, Preston as part of the Preston Guild celebrations. The one-day event, titled GFest, featured performances from Maverick Sabre, Labrinth and Stooshe and attracted thousands of festival-goers. The 2013 edition of the main Newcastle event featured The Vaccines, Ellie Goulding, Paloma Faith and Jake Bugg.

In 2014 Evolution Festival did not take place, although promoters Jim Mawdsley and Dave Stone said that it was not the end of Evolution Festival. The festival has, however, not been held since 2013 and no news of a relaunch has been announced. The Evolution brand continues through Evolution Emerging, a multiple venue event that showcases new bands from the local region.

== Line-ups ==
=== Orange Evolution 05 ===
Spiller's Wharf	Baltic Square	Quayside East
The Ordinary Boys; Mylo; Dogs Die In Hot Cars; The Rakes; El Presidente; Dizzee Rascal; Super Furry Animals	The Colour; Carbon Silicon; Fightstar; Hard-Fi; Vatican DC; Kubichek; The Futureheads; Boy Kill Boy; The Others	Vic Goddard; Charles Walker; Candi Staton; Misty in Roots; Mark Eitzel; American Music Club; 50 Foot Wave; Martin Stephenson & The Daintees

=== Orange Evolution 06 ===
Spiller's Wharf	Baltic Square	Quayside East
Hard-Fi; The On Offs; Graham Coxon; Freestylers; The Proclaimers; Boy Kill Boy; Sway; Orson (band)	The Go! Team; Richard Hawley; Jim Noir; Field Music; Liam Frost; The Sunshine Underground; Lorraine; The Bulletproof Stonelove Soundsystem; Indigo Colony	Richie Havens; Hayseed Dixie; Legendary Shack Shakers; The Handsome Family; Holly Gollightly; Morfo; The Eighteenth Day Of May

=== Orange Evolution 07 ===
Spiller's Wharf	Baltic Square
Maxïmo Park; Echo and the Bunnymen; Joe Jackson; The Enemy; Kano; Hot Club de Paris; The Motorettes; Hope MacDonald	Soulwax; Nite Versions; Calvin Harris; Chromeo; Simian Mobile Disco; Datarock; Shy Child; Bonde do Role; To My Boy

=== Evolution Festival 08 ===
Spiller's Wharf	Baltic Square
The Streets; Kate Nash; Reverend and the Makers; Duffy; Glasvegas; Lightspeed Champion; The Whip; This Ain't Vegas	CSS (band); New Young Pony Club; Crystal Castles; Does It Offend You, Yeah?; Hercules and Love Affair; Whomadewho; The Ghost Frequency, Kinevil

=== Evolution Festival 09 ===
Spiller's Wharf Sunday	Spiller's Wharf Monday
The Wombats; The Human League; White Lies; Imelda May; Twisted Wheel; The Puppini Sisters; Detroit Social Club; The Big Pink; The Chapman Family	Dizzee Rascal; The View; The Maccabees; Little Boots; Nouvelle Vague; VV Brown; Kid British; Little Comets; Marina and the Diamonds
Baltic Square Sunday	Baltic Square Monday
Boys Noize; Chase & Status; Kissy Sell Out; The Count & Sinden; Krafty Kuts and Dynamite MC; Rusko; Brodinski; Japanese Popstars; Yuksek; James Yuill; Doorly; People Get Real; TC Monckton; Oli P	Mystery Jets; Friendly Fires; Ladyhawke; Esser; Ebony Bones; Dead Kids; Fan Death; Viva City

=== Evolution Festival 2010 ===
Spiller's Wharf Sunday	Spiller's Wharf Monday
Paolo Nutini; Calvin Harris; Tinchy Stryder; The Futureheads; Field Music; Frankie & The Heartstrings; Twenty Twenty; Natalie Findlay; Let's Buy Happiness	Enter Shikari; The Horrors; De La Soul; Ellie Goulding; Dananananaykroyd; Everything Everything; Egyptian Hip Hop; Minnaars; Cosmo Jarvis; Polarsets
Baltic Square Sunday	Baltic Square Monday
Fake Blood; Benga; Rusko; Scratch Perverts; Beardyman; Filthy Dukes; Doorly; Jaymo & Andy George; Eskimo Twins; People Get Real	Delphic; Hadouken!; Example; Frankmusik; I Blame Coco; Ou Est Le Swimming Pool; Lonelady; Mirrors; Retriever
Ballast Hills Sunday	Ballast Hills Sunday
The Unthanks; King Creosote; Po Girl; James Hunter & The Jokers; Dawnlandes; John Smith; JT Nero & Friends	Donovan; Baskery; Lissie; Smoove & Turrell; Slow Club; Danny & The Champions of the World; Ben Howard

=== Evolution Festival 2011 ===
Spiller's Wharf Saturday	Spiller's Wharf Sunday
Iggy & The Stooges; Two Door Cinema Club; The Kills; Brother; Hercules & Love Affair; Flashguns; Bravestation; Waiting For Winter; Vinyl Jacket	Plan B; Tinie Tempah; Example; Darwin Deez; Detroit Social Club; The Cuban Brothers; Spark; Not Squares; Viva City
Baltic Square Saturday	Baltic Square Sunday
Katy B; Spank Rock; Jamie Woon; Cocknbullkid; Gaggle; Django Django; Loose Talk Costs Lives; Mammal Club; Toyger	Caribou; Annie Mac; Sub Focus & MC I.D; Mount Kimbie; Zinc; Breakage live & Jess Mills; Doorly; Professor Ojo; People Get Real
Ballast Hills Saturday	Ballast Hills Sunday
Billy Bragg; CW Stoneking; Smoke Fairies; Pete Molinari; Karima Francis; Good Lovelies; Cattle & Cane	Bellowhead; Kathyrn Williams; Mama Rosin; Ellen & The Escapades; Hurray For The Riff Raff; Sam Carter; Delta Maid

- Note: Clare Maguire replaced Fenech Soler who were playing the Baltic Stage due to illness within the band.
- Note: Toyger replaced Clare Maguire who was playing the Baltic Stage due to a last minute cancellation.

=== Evolution Festival 2012 ===
Spiller's Wharf Sunday	Spiller's Wharf Monday
Dizzee Rascal; Maxïmo Park; Miles Kane; Devlin; Benjamin Francis Leftwich; Dog Is Dead; Lulu James; Theme Park; The Lake Poets	Deadmau5; Noah & the Whale; Rizzle Kicks; Band Of Skulls; Where We Go Magic; Spector; Jessie Ware; The Milk; Mausi
Ballast Hills Sunday	Ballast Hills Monday
DJ Fresh; Jack Beats; Shy FX; Friction; Toddla T; Dot Rotten; Citizen; Codename:Tyrone	SBTRKT; Totally Enormous Extinct Dinosaurs (Live); Maya Jane Coles; Jackmaster; Eats Everything; People Get Real; Mike Jones

=== Evolution Festival 2013 ===
Spiller's Wharf Sunday	Spiller's Wharf Monday
The Vaccines; Ellie Goulding; Rudimental; The Strypes; Arlissa; The Lake Poets; Rossi Noise	Paloma Faith; Jake Bugg; Bastille; AlunaGeorge; Lulu James; Drenge; Eliza and the Bear
Ballast Hills Sunday	Ballast Hills Monday
Modestep; Lethal Bizzle; Loadstar; Delta Heavy; Dismantle; Decibel; Gentleman Jonny	Sub Focus; MistaJam; Zinc; Bondax; Gorgon City; P Money; Chroma; Dionysus
