= Run Rabbit Run (disambiguation) =

- "Run, Rabbit, Run" is a 1939 song by Noel Gay and Ralph Butler.

Run Rabbit Run may also refer to:

- Run Rabbit Run (album), a 2009 album by the Osso String Quartet
- Run Rabbit Run (film), a 2023 Australian horror film
- Run Rabbit Run (play), a 2004 play by Alana Valentine

== See also ==
- Rabbit Run (disambiguation)
- Run Rabbit
