= The Black Seminole =

2023 song by Lil Yachty

Song by Lil Yachty

from the album Let's Start Here
- Released: January 27, 2023
- Genre: Progressive rock; psychedelic rock
- Length: 6:52
- Label: Motown; Quality Control
- Songwriter: Miles McCollum
- Producers: Justin Raisen; Lil Yachty; Patrick Wimberly; SadPony; Jacob Portrait

"The Black Seminole" (stylized as "the BLACK seminole.") is a song by American rapper Lil Yachty. It was released on January 27, 2023, as the intro track from Yachty's fifth studio album Let's Start Here. The track includes vocals from Diana Gordon, who also contributes with vocals and verses on other tracks of the album.

== Composition ==
Writing for Clash, Robin Murray stated that the track "moves as a codeine-slow pace" and that "the submerged vocals fraught with drama" which lean on "slomo LA sleaze rock guitar solos". Exclaim!'s Alex Hudson stated that the influence from Pink Floyd's The Dark Side of the Moon "becomes extremely apparent on [the] proggy seven-minute opener" and that Yachty is "essentially cosplaying as Pink Floyd". The song is accompanied by "interstellar arpeggiators that ripple across the cosmos, epic drum fills, and wailing guitar and vocal solos".

== Credits and personnel ==
- Lil Yachty – vocals, songwriting, production
- Diana Gordon – vocals
- Justin Raisen – production, songwriting, recording
- Patrick Wimberly – production, songwriting
- SadPony – production, songwriting
- Anthony Paul Lopez – drums, songwriting, recording engineer
- Joe Kennedy Jr. - keys, songwriting
- Jacob Portrait – production, songwriting, recording
- Greg Calbi – mastering
- Steve Fallone – mastering
- Tom Elmhirst - mixing

== Charts ==
Chart performance for "The Black Seminole"
Chart (2023)	Peak position
Canada Hot 100 (Billboard)	79
Ireland (IRMA)	97
New Zealand Hot Singles (RMNZ)	7
US Billboard Hot 100	80
US Hot Rock & Alternative Songs (Billboard)	8
