= Don't You =

Don't You may refer to:

- Don't You (album), a 2016 album by Wet
- "Don't You" (song), a 1989 by The Forester Sisters
- "Don't You", a 1995 song by Robyn Hitchcock from You & Oblivion
- "Don't You", a 2021 song by Taylor Swift from Fearless (Taylor's Version)

== See also ==
- "Don't You (Forget About Me)", a 1985 song by Simple Minds
- "Don't Ya", a 2012 song by Brett Eldredge
- "Don't Cha", a song originally released by Tori Alamaze in 2004 and popularized by the Pussycat Dolls in 2005
