= CBIT =

CBIT or cbit may refer to:

- Continuous Built-in test
- CBIT (TV), a television rebroadcaster (channel 5) licensed to Sydney, Nova Scotia, Canada, rebroadcasting CBHT
- Chaitanya Bharathi Institute of Technology, an educational institution based in Gandipet, Hyderabad, India.
- classical bit. Used in quantum information theory to distinguish from qubit.
- Community Broadcast Initiative Tyneside, the operator of Newcastle upon Tyne community radio station NE1fm, and previously other Restricted Service Licence broadcasts
- Comprehensive Behavioral Intervention for Tics, a form of behavioral therapy used in the treatment of tic disorders
- Cobalt-precorrin-7 (C15)-methyltransferase (decarboxylating), an enzyme
