= Frances Rose =

New York City based musical duo

- Origin: New York, New York, United States of America
- Genres: Art rock; alternative rock; electronica; pop music
- Years active: 2011–present
- Labels: 169 Music
- Members: Sarah Frances Cagianese; Michelle Rose Cagianese
- Website: francesrosemusic.com

Frances Rose is a New York City based musical duo consisting of sisters Sarah Frances Cagianese and Michelle Rose Cagianese.

== Background ==
Hailing from rural Dutchess County in Hudson Valley New York, these upstate siblings began composing songs as young teenagers. The daughters to a guitarist father and a poet/French teacher mother, the Cagianese sisters have been making music together their entire lives. They began classical instruments at age 7. Sarah studied violin and Michelle learned cello. Sarah began playing guitar and songwriting at age 14 and began recording and playing live when she was 15. During her time at Boston University, Sarah performed as a solo acoustic artist. Michelle studied experimental theater at Bennington College before transferring to New School for music concentration. The sisters joined forces and signed to Warner/Chappell Music in 2012 through Neon Gold Records.

Sarah and Michelle are directly related to the House of Stathopoulo. Their great grandmother Elly (sister to Epi Stathopoulo) was the youngest child of Anastasios Stathopoulo, the Greek instrument maker who founded the House of Stathopoulo, later known as the Epiphone Guitar Company.

== Career ==
Built around the duel vocals of Sarah Frances and Michelle Rose the group's signature brand of moody, indie pop first appeared on the public radar in early 2012 with the single “Vampire,” released on Parisian label Kitsuné.

Updating pop and R&B sounds from the '80s and '90s, this singer/songwriter/producer duo made an impression with the gauzy pop tune “Questions” released in 2014, when they teamed up with Brooklyn-based producer Chordashian. Vocal harmonies and woodsy, folk-inspired pop take influence from the likes of Fleetwood Mac and Heart.

Frances Rose released single “Dangerous” in 2016 premiered by Bullett Media and released single “Read My Body” in 2017.

== Discography ==
- Vampire (2012 on Kitsuné)
- Questions (2014)
- Dangerous (2016)
- Read My Body (2017)
