= Let's Start Here =

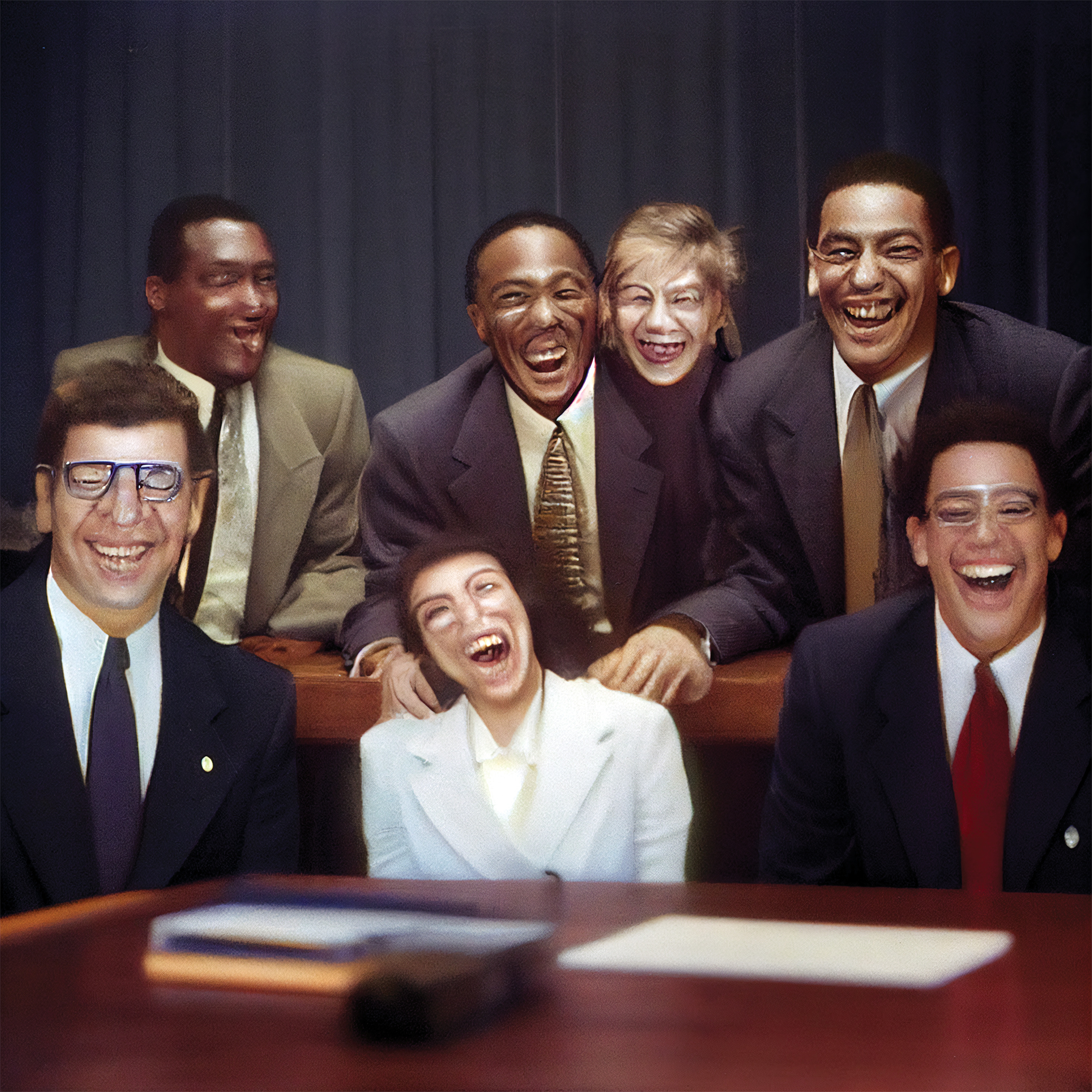

Studio album by Lil Yachty
- Released: January 27, 2023
- Recorded: 2021–2022
- Studios: Blue Room (Atlanta); Hit Gallery (Atlanta); The CRC (Brooklyn); Jizz Jazz (Los Angeles); The Tree House (Los Angeles); Electric Lady (New York City); Sonic Ranch (Tornillo)
- Genres: Psychedelic rock; psychedelic soul; funk
- Length: 57:16
- Labels: Motown; Quality Control
- Producers: Lil Yachty; Teo Halm; Jam City; Magdalena Bay; Jacob Portrait; Justin Raisen; SadPony; Patrick Wimberly

Lil Yachty chronology
Michigan Boy Boat (2021)	Let's Start Here (2023)	Something Ether (2024)

Let's Start Here is the fifth studio album by the American rapper Lil Yachty, released on January 27, 2023, through Motown and Quality Control Music. The album was recorded over the course of six months between 2021 and 2022, with sessions primarily taking place at the CRC in Brooklyn. The album is primarily a psychedelic rock, psychedelic soul, and funk record, which is a notable departure from Yachty's signature "bubble-gum trap" sound. Drawing inspiration from a variety of musicians—the most notable being Pink Floyd and their 1973 album The Dark Side of the Moon—Lil Yachty sought to create an album that would make people take him seriously as an artist. Lyrically, the album explores themes of lust, ecstasy, overdose, love, suicidal ideation, racism, and heartbreak. Its production was primarily handled by Patrick Wimberly with contributions from Jacob Portrait, SadPony, Justin Raisen, Magdalena Bay, Jam City, Teo Halm, and Lil Yachty himself.

Let's Start Here was preceded by the non-album single "Poland" in October 2022, which received positive reviews from critics. In December 2022, a low quality version of the album was leaked on the Internet under the official name Sonic Ranch; weeks later, his record label accidentally sent the album's preorders early to Amazon, aborting Lil Yachty's plans to use various videos to introduce and contextualize the album. Following its release, Lil Yachty released a music video for "Say Something", embarked on the Field Trip Tour across North America and Europe, and performed at Rolling Loud and on Saturday Night Live.

Let's Start Here debuted at number nine on the US Billboard 200 and at number one on three different Billboard charts, earning 36,000 album-equivalent units in its first week. The use of an AI-generated photograph for the album's artwork was controversial and was criticized by some fans. The album received generally positive reviews from music critics with some praising Lil Yachty's take on the psychedelic rock genre, while others believed it was repetitive and not experimental. It received praise from numerous high-profile musicians following its release. Several publications included it in their year-end lists.

== Background and recording ==
Throughout his career, Lil Yachty has been referred to as a rapper. He originally described his music as "bubble-gum trap", but has since denounced the phrase. His fourth studio album Lil Boat 3 was released in May 2020 to mixed reviews from critics, with some calling it "sloppy and forgettable" and others saying the album saw Lil Yachty "tak[ing] steps backwards". During January 2022, Lil Yachty hinted at his next release being "a non-rap album" and consisting of "all live instrumentation". His 2022 single "Poland" received positive critical reviews (Note: Attributed to multiple references:) and created a "mild international incident", according to Rolling Stone. Lil Yachty said he created the song as a joke. Let's Start Here producer SadPony felt the reception toward "Poland" proved that people would like the album's direction. Lil Yachty decided not to include it on the album because he felt it would not fit: "Just because it's a hit record doesn't mean it makes sense anywhere on this record."

Lil Yachty recorded Let's Start Here over the course of six months; recording sessions began in 2021 and concluded in 2022. Tyler, the Creator motivated Lil Yachty to start creating the album during a phone call with him. After that, Lil Yachty reached out to his friends who served as the album's instrumentalists, who then introduced him to other instrumentalists. The album was mainly produced by Patrick Wimberly, alongside Lil Yachty himself, Jacob Portrait, SadPony, Justin Raisen, Magdalena Bay, Jam City, and Teo Halm. The majority of the album was recorded at the CRC in Brooklyn, with other recording sessions taking place at Blue Room Studios and Hit Gallery Studios in Atlanta, Electric Lady Studios in New York City, Sonic Ranch in Tornillo, Texas, and the Tree House in Los Angeles. The album was the first one Lil Yachty recorded outside of Atlanta. The song "Drive Me Crazy!" was recorded at Mac DeMarco's Jizz Jazz Studios after Lil Yachty's A&R Gelareh Rouzbehani invited him to work with Halm and DeMarco. During the creation of the album, he would play the album for artists such as Kendrick Lamar, J. Cole, ASAP Rocky, Drake, and Tyler, the Creator. They all enjoyed the album, which made Lil Yachty feel good. A documentary about the album was recorded but he preferred not to release it as he did not want to give many details about the album's creation process: "I don't really care to talk about it, [because] you give it all away, you pull the curtain back". After finishing recording Let's Start Here, Lil Yachty recorded a hip-hop album. He plans to release the songs from the album separately as singles until his next "non-rap" album is done.

== Composition ==
=== Overview ===
Let's Start Here is a departure from Lil Yachty's signature "bubble-gum trap" sound, as it is primarily rooted in psychedelic rock, (Note: Attributed to multiple references:) psychedelic soul, and funk music. It has also been described as psychedelic pop, experimental rock, alternative rock, jazz, and art pop by select music publications. Robert Christgau conversely argued that the album is not psychedelic rock, and instead aligns with "unusual hip-hop" and R&B. Matthew Ramirez of NPR called the album Lil Yachty's "reinvention" and a "born-again artist's statement". The Guardian's Sasha Mistlin called Lil Yachty a "psychedelic genre-hopper" and that his intent of no longer being a trap artist was clear. Robin Murray of Clash noted its use of samples reminiscent of early Washed Out albums and 1980s references, For Exclaim!, Alex Hudson wrote that the album has a "charmingly naïve quality" to it and contains "golden pop melodies, towering space rock and ambient synth fuckery." Fred Thomas of AllMusic said the album is "more loud guitars than 808s" and Lil Yachty created ways to express himself using any sounds he likes. Thomas further commented that the album isn't "completely void of rapping" and contains "live instrumentation heavy on slick jazzy guitars, big drums, and fantastical synths." Lyndsey Havens from Billboard said the album "plays like one long song". The lyrics of Let's Start Here explores lust, ecstasy, overdose, love, suicidal ideation, racism, and heartbreak. Jeff Ihaza of Rolling Stone viewed maturation as one of the album's central themes. Hudson and Jayson Buford of Stereogum highlighted their exploration of consciousness and the subconscious, whilst Thomas noted their vulnerable, introspective nature.

Let's Start Here was heavily influenced by Pink Floyd's The Dark Side of the Moon (1973). Lil Yachty first heard the album in 2017, and credited it with "[altering his] perspective on music". In an interview with Variety, he called Let's Start Here his attempt to make "[his] Black Dark Side of the Moon". He further stated: "I wanted to show the most love to The Dark Side of the Moon without it being The Dark Side of the Moon, 'cos I'm my own person." The album also inspired Lil Yachty's decision to use three female vocalists on Let's Start Here: Fousheé, Justine Skye, and Diana Gordon. Tame Impala's Currents (2015) and Frank Ocean's Blonde (2016) served as additional influences. Lil Yachty was also inspired by Tyler, the Creator's Igor (2019), and asked Tyler, the Creator for advice on creating a "world" for the album because he wanted to make a "pop-funk-psychedelic-rock album cohesive, without it sounding like someone's playlist." Lil Yachty also named Bon Iver, Black Sabbath, and James Brown as references on the album, and mentioned the influences of musicians he heard played by his family, including Coldplay, Radiohead, John Mayer, John Coltrane, Miles Davis, Brown, and Pharrell Williams.

While making the album, Lil Yachty would often self-assess and concluded that he was unhappy about where he was musically. He said that the "shit [he] was making did not add up to the shit [he] listened to" and wanted to be remembered, respected, and taken seriously as an artist. Since the release of the album, Lil Yachty has distanced himself from his previous albums, telling Billboard "Fuck any of the albums I dropped before this one". He also has said that he feels fully represented by Let's Start Here. He had planned for his second studio album Lil Boat 2 (2018) to be Let's Start Here, but he was too nervous to experiment and felt insufficiently experienced with alternative music. The album also went through four or five title changes. The title Momentary Bliss was considered because the album is "meant to take you away from reality ... where you're truly listening". 180 Degrees was also considered because the album is "the complete opposite of anything [Lil Yachty has] ever done" but people thought that it was too obvious of a title.

=== Songs ===
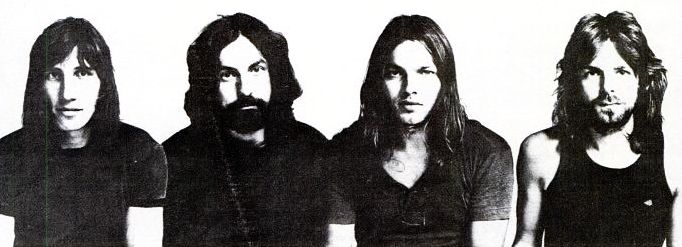
Let's Start Here's opening track "The Black Seminole" was compared to Pink Floyd's 1973 album The Dark Side of the Moon by multiple reviewers. Lil Yachty also named it as a major influence on Let's Start Here.

The opening track of Let's Start Here is "The Black Seminole", a near-seven-minute synth-funk track that was compared to Pink Floyd and Funkadelic's Maggot Brain (1971). The track begins with guitar chords and beating drums which then transitions to Gordon's "wailing" vocals over a wall of drums and a hard rock guitar riff that comes to a rapturous finish. Using vocal solos, Lil Yachty compares himself to an industry outcast and its title is a reference to the Afro-Seminole people. According to Hudson, the track contains "interstellar" arpeggiators, "epic drum fills, and wailing guitar solos". Jenkins said the song is "an attempt to jam every idea housed in Pink Floyd's The Dark Side of the Moon into a single seven-minute performance." Jo Kendall of Prog said the track "seems to sum up the whole of The Dark Side of the Moon in one piece". Hudson wrote that the influence of The Dark Side of the Moon "becomes extremely apparent" on the track. A "syrupy pop ballad", "The Ride" features vocals from Teezo Touchdown and is about Lil Yachty's journey in hip-hop. It was compared to Tame Impala and DeMarco alongside the following "Running Out of Time", which opens with a warble and an extended jazz intro that continues into a 1970s-inspired dance groove underscored by a funk bass. It features both male and female vocals over swaying 1980s-inspired synths. "Pretty" includes vocals from Fousheé and presents Lil Yachty using warbled vocals to express a softer and romantic side of himself, expressing himself with "a cathartic transparency" according to Barglowski. The spoken word and ambient "Failure" exhibits Lil Yachty honestly reflecting on his experience through the ups and downs of being successful. "The Zone" is a grunge and funk track that "blooms over and over again" and is highlighted by Skye's "sweet and unhurried" melodies. The "meditative" "We Saw the Sun!" begins with a "drawn-out" intro and outro and contains "whining" reverb. The track ends with a sample of the painter Bob Ross from the television show The Joy of Painting (1983–1994).

"Drive Me Crazy!" also contains vocals from Gordon, and was compared to Marvin Gaye and Silk Sonic by reviewers. Gordon performs a falsetto-led funk on the disco-influenced track. The track also contains a heavily Auto-Tuned wobbling falsetto from Lil Yachty, which Hudson said "effectively connect[s] his origins in bubblegum trap with this more recent fascination with far-out psychedelia". The psychedelic garage rock "I've Officially Lost Vision!!!!" begins with echoed screams atop a scratched vinyl sample of a choir. Thundering guitars then build intensity in a psychedelic groove. The guitars pick up and fizzle out between the song's build up and drop. Tom Johnson of Beats Per Minute compared the song to numerous musicians; he likened its guitar riffs to that of John Lennon, and its breakdown—segueing into a "jive" akin to the Beatles' Revolver (1966) where Yachty emulates Henry Rollins, "but yapping about peyote rather than politics"—to Alicia Keys. The downtempo R&B track "Say Something" contains shimmering synths and 1980s-pop-inspired synth pads and "echoing" drums. The atmospheric "Paint the Sky" drew comparisons to both the Weeknd and his album Dawn FM (2022), as well as M83. The lyrics in the following "Should I B?" are plainspoken, a track in which was called "ungodly catchy" by Sputnikmusic, and "harder edged" by Thomas. The penultimate "The Alchemist" is a grunge track that contains a crescendo. The climactic finale "Reach the Sunshine" slowly builds up to vocal contributions from Daniel Caesar.

== Promotion and release ==
In December 2022, an old and low quality version of Let's Start Here dubbed Sonic Ranch leaked on the Internet. Lil Yachty said experiencing the leak being shared online was the "saddest [he had] ever been". Weeks after the original leak, his record label accidentally sent the album's preorders early to Amazon, revealing the album's cover, track list, and release date prematurely. He originally had a plan to promote the album using various videos to introduce and "contextualize" the album, but cancelled the promotion due to the leaks. Lil Yachty officially announced Let's Start Here on Instagram on January 17, 2023, posting the album's cover art, title, and release date. Created by Jon Rafman, the cover is an AI-generated photograph of men and women wearing suits in a boardroom with "contorted facial features and warped smiles". The cover art was controversial and was criticized by some fans. Lil Yachty's Instagram caption referred to the album as "Chapter 2", and Variety called it "a potential redux" of the leaked Sonic Ranch.

On January 24, 2023, Lil Yachty released a "thriller-style" skit in promotion of Let's Start Here titled "Department of Mental Tranquility", in which he arrives at the titular department and is asked a series of questions by the receptionist in a waiting room full of people behaving erratically. He then walks down a narrow hallway and into a bright white room. The album was released through Motown and Quality Control Music on January 27, 2023. On the same day, a music video directed by Crowns & Owls for the track "Say Something" was released. Following its release, high-profile musicians such as Questlove, Mike Dean, Saul Williams, Flea, Rapsody, A-Trak, John Stamos, Nate Smith, and others praised Let's Start Here on Instagram. Lil Yachty performed songs from the album for the first time at Rolling Loud in California with his all-woman band during March 2023. He also performed "The Black Seminole" and "Drive Me Crazy!" on Saturday Night Live with Gordon and a live band on April 1, 2023. On May 9, 2023, he announced the Field Trip Tour across North America and Europe to support the album. The tour began on September 21, 2023, in Washington, D.C. and concluded in Vienna on December 17.

== Critical reception ==
Let's Start Here ratings
Aggregate scores
Source	Rating
AnyDecentMusic?	7.1/10
Metacritic	73/100
Review scores
Source	Rating
AllMusic	4/5 stars
And It Don't Stop	(1-star Honorable Mention)
Beats Per Minute	75%
Clash	7/10
Exclaim!	8/10
The Guardian	5/5 stars
HipHopDX	3.4/5
Pitchfork	6.0/10
Spectrum Culture	75%
Sputnikmusic	3.8/5

Let's Start Here was met with generally positive reviews. At Metacritic, which assigns a rating out of 100 to reviews from professional publications, the album received a weighted average score of 73, based on nine reviews. Aggregator AnyDecentMusic? gave it 7.1 out of 10, based on their assessment of the critical consensus.

Jeff Ihaza of Rolling Stone believed the album feels "as cohesive a project as any artist has released in the streaming era" and said Lil Yachty has the ability to "turn familiar source material into something entirely new." For AllMusic, Thomas thought that Lil Yachty's emotive singing on psychedelic rock instrumentals still displayed "the bold personality and curious spirit he showed on trap beats". Writing for Exclaim!, Hudson called the album a "sense of unselfconscious exploration". Sputnikmusic said the album is "messy, ridiculous, admirable in its ambition and absolutely insane in its execution" and called it "a big departure" for Lil Yachty. Johnson of Beats Per Minute wrote that "If anyone was going to do something this unexpected it was going to be Yachty." Spectrum Culture's Connor Flynn believed that Lil Yachty used melodies and flows not heard before in psychedelic rock, but also thought that some parts of the album felt clumsy. Though he further praised the album for "successfully blend[ing] psych and hip-hop and put[ting] a new spin on an old sound." Though Murray believed the results are "patchy", he wrote that the album contains "some of [Lil Yachty's] best work yet" in a review for Clash.

Some reviewers were more qualified in their praise. For Vulture, Jenkins wrote that "Let's Start Here isn't Lil Yachty's greatest work, but it goes over better than the pitch—'Poland' guy does shrooms and jams on instruments—implied it might." In a review for HipHopDX, Barglowski said that the album is "exciting at the first listen because the style is new to Lil Yachty himself" but the sound "tends to dull over time with repetition." Pitchfork's Alphonse Pierre thought the album's sound is "so immediately appealing that it doesn't feel experimental at all." Though he highlighted Lil Yachty's versatility, he overall believed that "Poland" is "stranger than anything here".

=== Year-end lists ===
Several publications included Let's Start Here in their lists of best albums of 2023, including top-ten placements from The A.V. Club, Rolling Stone, Billboard, and Complex. It was also included in The Guardian's list of "The five-star albums we missed in 2023".

Select year-end rankings of Let's Start Here
Critic/Publication	List	Rank	Ref.
The A.V. Club	The 27 Best Albums of 2023	6	
Billboard	The 50 Best Albums of 2023	8	
Complex	The Best Albums of 2023	10	
Crack	The Top 50 Albums of the Year	17	
Esquire	The 20 Best Albums of 2023	13	
Exclaim!	Exclaim!'s 50 Best Albums of 2023	38	
NME	The Best Albums of 2023	50	
Rolling Stone	The 100 Best Albums of 2023	4	

== Commercial performance ==
Let's Start Here debuted at number nine on the US Billboard 200 chart, earning 36,000 album-equivalent units (including 4,000 copies in pure album sales) in its first week. This became Lil Yachty's third U.S. top-10 debut on the chart. The album also accumulated a total of 41.34 million on-demand streams. The album also debuted at number one on Billboard's Top Rock & Alternative Albums, Top Rock Albums, and Top Alternative Albums. All tracks from the album debuted within the top 50 of the US Hot Rock & Alternative Songs, with "The Black Seminole" placing at number eight on the chart.

== Track listing ==
Let's Start Here track listing
No.	Title	Writer(s)	Producer(s)	Length
1.	"The Black Seminole"	Miles McCollum; Patrick Wimberly; Justin Raisen; Jeremiah Raisen; Jake Portrait; Anthony Lopez; Joe Kennedy	Lil Yachty; Wimberly; Justin Raisen; SadPony; Portrait	6:51
2.	"The Ride"	McCollum; Wimberly; Justin Raisen; Jeremiah Raisen; Jack Latham; Aaron Thomas; Miles Benjamin Anthony Robinson	Lil Yachty; Wimberly; Justin Raisen; SadPony; Jam City	3:10
3.	"Running Out of Time"	McCollum; Wimberly; Justin Raisen; Jeremiah Raisen; Mica Tenenbaum; Matthew Lewin	Wimberly; Justin Raisen; SadPony; Magdalena Bay	4:29
4.	"Pretty"	McCollum; Wimberly; Justin Raisen; Jeremiah Raisen; Latham; Brittany Fousheé	Wimberly; Justin Raisen; SadPony; Jam City	2:42
5.	"Failure"	McCollum; Portrait; Alexander Giannascoli; MacBriare DeMarco; Nikolas Hakim	Portrait	2:47
6.	"The Zone"	McCollum; Wimberly; Jeremiah Raisen; Portrait; Robinson	Wimberly; SadPony; Portrait; Robinson^{[a]}; Khaya "Baby K" Cohen^{[a]}	4:09
7.	"We Saw the Sun!"	McCollum; Wimberly; Justin Raisen; Jeremiah Raisen; Portrait; Anthony Clemons Jr.	Wimberly; Justin Raisen; SadPony; Portrait	5:31
8.	"Drive Me Crazy!"	McCollum; Wimberly; Jeremiah Raisen; Teo Halm; Giorgia Romano; Ben Goldwasser; DeMarco; Dylan Teixeira	Wimberly; SadPony; Halm	3:49
9.	"I've Officially Lost Vision!!!!"	McCollum; Wimberly; Jeremiah Raisen; Portrait; Romano	Wimberly; SadPony; Portrait	5:22
10.	"Say Something"	McCollum; Wimberly; Justin Raisen; Jeremiah Raisen; Latham	Wimberly; Justin Raisen; SadPony; Jam City	3:32
11.	"Paint the Sky"	McCollum; Wimberly; Justin Raisen; Jeremiah Raisen; Anthony Lopez; Daystar Peterson	Wimberly; Justin Raisen; SadPony; Lopez^{[a]}	3:05
12.	"Should I B?"	McCollum; Wimberly; Justin Raisen; Jeremiah Raisen; Portrait	Wimberly; Justin Raisen; SadPony; Portrait	2:48
13.	"The Alchemist"	McCollum; Wimberly; Jeremiah Raisen; Portrait; Fousheé	Wimberly; SadPony; Portrait	2:56
14.	"Reach the Sunshine"	McCollum; Wimberly; Jeremiah Raisen; Portrait; Hakim; Daniel Caesar; Lopez; Joe Kennedy Jr.	Wimberly; SadPony; Portrait; Nick Hakim^{[a]}	5:58
Total length:				57:16

Notes

- ^{^[a]} signifies an additional producer

== Personnel ==
Credits adapted from liner notes.

Musicians

- Lil Yachty – vocals (all tracks)
- Diana Gordon – vocals (1, 8, 9)
- Teezo Touchdown – vocals (2)
- Justine Skye – vocals (3, 6)
- Fousheé – vocals (4, 13)
- Khaya "Baby K" Cohen – background vocals (6)
- Ant Clemons – vocals (7)
- Ben Goldwasser – keyboards (8)
- Gillian Rivers – strings, strings direction (8, 10, 14)
- Jake Portrait – programming (9)
- Justin Raisen – background vocals (14)
- Daniel Caesar – vocals (14)
- Nick Hakim – vocals (14)

Technical

- Greg Calbi – mastering
- Steve Fallone – mastering
- Tom Elmhirst – mixing
- Miles BA Robinson – engineering (1–3, 5–14), vocal programming (1–3, 8)
- Justin Raisen – engineering (1, 3, 7, 11, 12, 14)
- Jake Portrait – engineering (1, 5, 7, 9, 12, 13)
- Anthony Lopez – engineering (1, 10, 14)
- SadPony – engineering (2, 10)
- Gent Memishi – engineering (3, 4, 10–13), vocal programming (4, 10)
- Patrick Wimberly – engineering (5, 11, 14)
- Ainjel Emme – engineering, vocal programming (10)
- Adam Hong – mixing assistance

Visuals and design

- Jon Rafman – artwork
- Aris Tatalovich – creative director, design
- Cam Hicks – creative director
- Tara Razavi – creative director

Managerial

- Kevin "Coach K" Lee – executive producer
- Lil Yachty – executive producer
- Patrick Wimberly – executive producer
- Pierre "P" Thomas – executive producer
- SadPony – executive producer
- Nathan Ledesma – product manager
- Jill Lamothe – production manager

== Charts ==
Chart performance for Let's Start Here
Chart (2023)	Peak position
Australian Albums (ARIA)	37
Austrian Albums (Ö3 Austria)	23
Belgian Albums (Ultratop Flanders)	31
Belgian Albums (Ultratop Wallonia)	118
Canadian Albums (Billboard)	10
Danish Albums (Hitlisten)	24
Dutch Albums (Album Top 100)	37
Finnish Albums (Suomen virallinen lista)	44
French Albums (SNEP)	109
German Albums (Offizielle Top 100)	50
Irish Albums (Official Charts)	27
Lithuanian Albums (AGATA)	18
New Zealand Albums (RMNZ)	11
Norwegian Albums (VG-lista)	11
Swiss Albums (Schweizer Hitparade)	13
UK Albums (Official Charts)	32
US Billboard 200	9
US Top Alternative Albums (Billboard)	1
US Top Rock Albums (Billboard)	1

== Release history ==
Release dates and formats for Let's Start Here
Region	Date	Label(s)	Format(s)	Ref.
Various	January 27, 2023	Motown; Quality Control	Digital download; streaming; vinyl	
