= Moth (album) =

Studio album by Chairlift
- Released: January 22, 2016
- Recorded: 2014–2015
- Studio: Chairlift Studio, Brooklyn, New York City
- Genre: Indie pop; synthpop
- Label: Columbia
- Producer: Chairlift; Robin Hannibal; Cecil Frena

Chairlift chronology
Something (2012)	Moth (2016)

Singles from Moth
- 1. "Ch-Ching" Released: October 14, 2015; 2. "Romeo" Released: November 30, 2015; 3. "Crying In Public" Released: January 8, 2016; 4. "Moth To The Flame" Released: January 13, 2016

Moth is the third and final full-length album by American indie band Chairlift, released in the United States via Columbia Records on January 22, 2016. The album art was created by NYC visual artist Rebecca Bird.

== Critical reception ==
Professional ratings
Aggregate scores
Source	Rating
AnyDecentMusic?	7.1/10
Metacritic	73/100
Review scores
Source	Rating
AllMusic	4/5 stars
Exclaim!	8/10
Drowned in Sound	7/10
Spin	8/10
Pitchfork	7.6/10

Before being released, Consequence of Sound, Pitchfork, Stereogum, and Billboard included Moth in their lists of most anticipated albums of 2016, and it has received generally favorable reviews. Brooklyn Magazine named the album its "Album of the Month" for January 2016.

Moth received mostly positive reviews from contemporary music critics. At Metacritic, which assigns a normalized rating out of 100 to reviews from mainstream critics, the album received an average score of 73, based on 21 reviews, which indicates "generally favorable reviews". Writing for Allmusic, Tim Sendra characterized Moth as "an album that amplifies the pop aspects of Something and blows it out into a sometimes brilliant listening experience." In a positive review for Exclaim!, Stephen Carlick wrote that "with Moth, Chairlift make a strong claim to being one of pop music's best songwriting teams, with the production and vocal chops to bring their compositions fully and vibrantly to life." Rolling Stone praised the album as "a record where love, music and love for music come together beautifully."

== Track listing ==
Moth
No.	Title	Lyrics	Music	Producer(s)	Length
1.	"Look Up"	Caroline Polachek	Chairlift	Patrick Wimberly; Polachek	2:14
2.	"Polymorphing"	Polachek	Chairlift	Wimberly; Polachek	4:43
3.	"Romeo"	Polachek	Chairlift	Wimberly; Polachek; Cecil Frena^{[a]}	3:08
4.	"Ch-Ching"	Polachek; Wimberly	Chairlift	Chairlift; Robin Hannibal	3:47
5.	"Crying in Public"	Polachek	Chairlift; Joey Postiglione	Wimberly; Polachek	4:28
6.	"Ottawa to Osaka"	Polachek	Chairlift	Wimberly; Polachek	4:55
7.	"Moth to the Flame"	Polachek	Chairlift	Chairlift; Hannibal	2:57
8.	"Show U Off"	Polachek	Chairlift	Chairlift; Hannibal	3:32
9.	"Unfinished Business"	Polachek	Chairlift	Wimberly; Polachek	4:33
10.	"No Such Thing as Illusion"	Polachek	Chairlift; David "Dj" Ginyard; Postiglione; Kurt Feldman; Patrick South	Wimberly; Polachek	6:26
Total length:					40:43

Notes

- ^{^[a]} signifies an additional producer.

== Personnel ==
Chairlift

- Caroline Polachek – vocals (all tracks), synthesizer (1–3, 5–10), bass (2, 4, 5, 7), bongos (2, 7), drums (2, 4, 7); horn, shaker (2); castanets, violin (6); engineering, percussion (7); piano (8), oboe, snare drum (9)
- Patrick Wimberly – engineering (all tracks); drums (1–4, 8, 10), guitar (1, 2, 5, 8, 9), marimba (1), horn (2, 4, 10), percussion (2, 7–9), synthesizer (2–10), vocals (2–4), acoustic guitar (3), bass (4–6, 9); autoharp, cymbals (7); programming (7, 8, 10)

Additional musicians

- Danny Meyer – saxophone (1, 2, 4, 8, 10)
- David Ginyard – bass (2, 8, 10)
- Joey Postiglione – guitar (2, 5), synthesizer (10)
- Kurt Feldman – guitar (2, 10)
- John Lake – trumpet (2)
- Miles B.A. Robinson – speaker (3)
- Robin Hannibal – bass (4), drums (4, 7, 8); keyboards, percussion (4, 8)
- Juri Onuki – speaker (6)
- Emily Holden – violin (6)
- Joel Van Dijk – guitar (7, 8)
- Dustin Schletzer – snare drum (9)

Technical

- Chris Gehringer – mastering
- Jaycen Joshua – mixing (1, 3, 4, 6, 8)
- Mick Guzauski – mixing (2, 7, 9, 10)
- Tom Elmhirst – mixing (5)
- Jake Aron – engineering
- Miles B.A. Robinson – engineering
- Yale Yng-Wong – engineering
- Rob Cohen – engineering (4, 7, 8)
- Maddox Chhim – engineering assistance (1, 3, 4, 6, 8)
- Ryan Kaul – engineering assistance (1, 3, 4, 6, 8)
- Chad Wilson – engineering assistance (4, 8)
- Joe Visciano – engineering assistance (5)

== Charts ==
Chart performance for Moth
Chart (2016)	Peak position
US Heatseekers Albums (Billboard)	7
US Top Rock Albums (Billboard)	32
