= Don't You (album) =

Studio album by Wet
- Released: January 29, 2016
- Recorded: 2015
- Genre: Indie pop; indietronica; dream pop; ambient pop; alternative R&B
- Length: 41:17
- Label: Columbia
- Producer: Noah Beresin; Tom Elmhirst; Robin Hannibal; Justyn Pilbrow; Chris Smith; Wet; Patrick Wimberly

Wet chronology
Wet (2013)	Don't You (2016)	Still Run (2018)

Professional ratings
Aggregate scores
Source	Rating
Metacritic	61/100
Review scores
Source	Rating
AllMusic	3/5 stars
DIY	4/5 stars
Rolling Stone	4/5 stars

Don't You is the debut studio album by American band Wet. It was released on January 29, 2016, by Columbia Records.

== Track listing ==
All lyrics are written by Kelly Zutrau; all music is composed by Joseph Valle, Kelly Zutrau, and Martin Sulkow, except where noted.

Don't You
No.	Title	Music	Producer(s)	Length
1.	"It's All in Vain"		Wet	3:34
2.	"Deadwater"		Wet; Noah Beresin; Ced Solo	3:37
3.	"Don't Wanna Be Your Girl"	Smith	Wet; Chris Smith; Beresin	3:17
4.	"Weak"		Wet; Smith; Justyn Pilbrow; Solo; Patrick Wimberly^{[a]}	3:45
5.	"Island"		Wet; Wimberly; Beresin; Pilbrow; Solo	4:23
6.	"All the Ways"		Wet; Robin Hannibal; Pilbrow; Solo	3:33
7.	"Small and Silver"		Wet; Pilbrow; Solo	3:51
8.	"You're the Best"	Smith	Wet; Smith; Solo	2:58
9.	"Move Me"		Wet; Beresin; Smith; Solo	3:36
10.	"Body"		Wet; Wimberly; Pilbrow; Solo	4:17
11.	"These Days"		Wet; Wimberly; Pilbrow; Tom Elmhirst; Solo	4:26

Notes

- ^{^a} signifies an assistant producer.

== Personnel ==
Musicians

- Noah Beresin – piano (tracks 1, 2, 5)
- Chris Smith – background vocals (3, 4), keyboards (3), vocals (8)
- Nat Baldwin – bass (4, 11)
- Patrick Wimberly – strings (4, 5, 10), piano (11)
- Kelsey Lu – cello (4, 5, 10, 11)
- Marques Toliver – violin (4, 5, 10, 11)

Technical

- Ted Jensen – mastering
- Tom Elmhirst – mixing
- Joe Visciano – mixing (6), engineering assistance (all tracks)
- Danny Bernini – engineering (1, 2, 5, 9)
- Mark Alan Miller – engineering (1, 4)
- Billy Pavone – engineering (3, 9)
- Chris Pummil – engineering (4)
- Christopher Chase – engineering (4, 10, 11)
- Miles B.A. Robinson – engineering (4, 5, 10, 11)
- Matt Shane – engineering (8)
- Alex Epton – engineering (9)
- Richard Levengood – engineering assistance (4)
- Brandon Bost – engineering assistance (6)

== Charts ==
Chart (2016)	Peak position
Australian Albums (ARIA)	77
Canadian Albums (Billboard)	55
UK Albums (OCC)	184
US Billboard 200	76
