= Aaron Pfenning =

American musical artist (born 1983)

- Also known as: Rewards
- Born: Aaron Marshall Davis; October 31, 1983 (age 43); Tulsa, Oklahoma, U.S.
- Genres: Indie pop; alternative
- Occupations: Singer-songwriter, musician, producer
- Years active: 2005–present
- Labels: Columbia; DFA
- Formerly of: Chairlift

Aaron Pfenning (born Aaron Marshall Davis; October 31, 1983) is an American multi-instrumentalist, singer-songwriter, and record producer who performs under the moniker "Rewards", a name he first used in 2003.

From 2005 to 2010, Pfenning performed in the band Chairlift. Pfenning has also toured with We Are Scientists, Brandon Flowers, Tanlines, and Warpaint.

== Career ==
=== Chairlift (2005–2010) ===
In 2005, Pfenning co-founded the band Chairlift in Boulder, Colorado with his then-girlfriend Caroline Polachek while still in college. In 2006, Chairlift relocated to Brooklyn, New York, where the final version of Does You Inspire You was written and produced, and later released on Columbia Records.

Chairlift's song "Bruises" was used in an iPod Nano commercial. Pfenning departed Chairlift in January 2010 while ending a tour in Australia, sometime after his romantic relationship with Polachek ended, thus leaving a major record label deal.

=== Rewards (2010–present) ===
In 2011, Pfenning released the Rewards single "Equal Dreams" featuring Solange Knowles, via DFA Records. The B-side "Asleep With The Lights On" features Blood Orange's Dev Hynes.

=== Collaborations ===
Pfenning has appeared in music videos for "Party" by Beyoncé (2011), and "Dinner" by Blood Orange (2011). In 2012, he collaborated with the actress Alia Shawkat on a cover of Chris Isaak's "Wicked Game". He worked with the band School of Seven Bells, remixing the song "The Night" (2012). Pfenning appears in Adam Green's 2016 feature film "Adam Green's Aladdin" as a townsperson.
