= Nova Radio North East =

- Newcastle upon Tyne; England
- Broadcast area: Worldwide (Online)

Programming
- Language: English
- Format: Community radio

History
- Former call signs: NE1

Links
- Website: www.novaradio.co.uk

Nova Radio North East, (formerly NE1fm) was an FM community radio station based in Newcastle upon Tyne, England. Launched in 2007, the station broadcast 24 hours a day on 102.5 FM, and online via its website. The station is owned by CBIT (Community Broadcast Initiative Tyneside Ltd). They were awarded a five-year community broadcast licence by Ofcom in 2006, which has since been extended to 2022.

Nova Radio NE carries a wide variety of content, catering for both mainstream and niche musical genres, and also broadcasts interviews and sports, talk and comedy-based shows. Nova Radio NE has broadcast more than 100 different shows during its time on-air, including enabling members of the local community to present as part of its open access programming. The station also broadcasts from musical and other events in the local area, promotes local bands, and highlights community issues on a regular basis.

The name was a play on the postcode district NE1 (where the station was originally located). In addition to the station's community radio status where "anyone" can apply to broadcast or help out with the station's off-air operation.

In June 2019, the station was rebranded to Nova Radio North East as the station was taken over, and merged with an online station of the same name in Newcastle.

In December 2023 they had their FM licence revoked and is only available online via their website and apps

== History ==
=== 2004–2007: Pre-projects and station launch ===
Prior to the formation of the project leading to the launch, a number of Restricted Service Licence broadcasts had taken place in Newcastle upon Tyne, many of which were operated by or involved founding members of the station. These included ACE Radio, West End Broadcast and City FM, the latter of which ran from 13 September 2004 to 9 October 2004. Following this broadcast, an application for Ofcom's advertised community radio licence for the area was made on 19 November 2004. The application of Community Broadcast Initiative Tyneside was successful, with a five-year licence awarded in 2006.

The radio station launched on 8 June 2007 with a weekend of broadcasts from Newcastle's Green Festival, resulting in much of the launch weekend being conducted via an outside broadcast studio at Leazes Park. During the weekend, the station broadcast a large amount of live music, particularly electronic music, interspersed with interviews with festival participants and general continuity from a variety of on-air personnel. On Monday 11 June 2007, the stations regular schedule commenced with the long-running alternative music show Unknown Pleasures.

=== 2007–2009: Transmitter thefts and programming expansions ===
logo used from June 2007 – August 2012

In the months following the launch, regular programming included Alternation, Atomic, Pavement Pizza and The Hedley Show. Broadcasts also took place from a number of other festivals, including the Asian-orientated Mela Festival, and the Newcastle stage of the AV Festival in March 2008, although broadcasts from the latter were met with problems and resulted in broadcasts ceasing before the festival's conclusion. Other festivals and outside events covered throughout the station's first year included the 2008 Irish Festival and the 2008 Eat Festival.

The station was, in November 2007, presented with a plaque by hardware chain B&Q as part of their annual You Can Do It awards, resulting in £5,000 of funding to fully construct a second studio and improve the station's primitive facilities. The second studio was completed shortly thereafter. The station also during this period had its transmission equipment stolen, resulting in two off-air stints in December 2007 and March 2008, the latter of which was covered as the headline story on local news programme North East Tonight later that day.

Throughout 2008 and 2009, the station continued to broadcast a wide variety of on-air content, with a number of long-running shows catering to audiences largely ignored by commercial radio stations in the region. Long-running shows included The Groove Principle, a soul music show, and Anyone For Country, a specialist country music broadcast. During this time period, however, a number of long-running shows ended their tenure on the station – either permanently or temporarily – including Ghetto Method and The Takeover. The station also occasionally broadcast breakfast and lunchtime shows, although largely focused on evening broadcasts, with largely uninterrupted music broadcast overnight and during the day.

=== 2009–2010: Station relocation and programming changes ===
In late 2009, the station went through its most significant period of change since its launch in 2007, relocating from the Shieldfield area of Newcastle upon Tyne to purpose-built studios at Virginia House, which are shared with the community group The Cyrenians. Although this did not affect the broadcast area of NE1fm, it marked the end of thirty months of broadcast in a church building that had not typically been designed for radio broadcast, and allowed for the station to make further changes to its operation and sound. Shortly after the move, shifts in the station's management structure also occurred, with a number of founding members quoted on the initial Ofcom application ceasing to be involved with the station. The station also updated its website after three years of limited updates.

Along with the relocation, a number of programming changes also occurred during this time period. One significant change was the end of The Live Session, a weekly acoustic broadcast that had featured and given exposure to a large quantity of local and little-known bands during NE1fm's time on-air; The Live Session's departure, however, was intended to be brief, with the station advertising for a replacement presenter for the show. A new live music show, Hit the North (East), debuted in late 2010. The station also began to focus areas of its programming toward younger people, with a larger amount of new music played during the day and coverage of popular events including Evolution Festival.

=== 2011–2012: Recent developments, downtime and return to FM ===
The station Logo launched in August 2012 and used until June 2017

The first months of 2011 included the announcement that the station's soul programming, featured prominently on Sundays since launch, would be discontinued. Soul music has since returned in a smaller capacity. Programming of significance early in the year included special programmes covering Gateshead F.C.'s run in the 2011 FA Trophy, the launch of the community-focused broadcast No Excuse, and the re-branding of the weekend breakfast shows to include live music, including a variety from the 2011 Evolution Emerging line-up.

The digital presence of the station was overhauled during Spring of 2011, including visibly heightened usage of their Facebook and Twitter accounts and the launch of a new website. A second edition of the new website appeared in February 2012, including the introduction of show blogs and a section promoting music from local artists.

On 27 September 2011, station volunteers Rob Davies and Gary Barnes launched a locally high-profile attempt to break the current world record for the longest team radio broadcast, previously held by Chris Moyles of BBC Radio 1, for the benefit of two local charities. Their attempt finished at midday on Friday 30 September, lasting a total of 76 hours, exceeding the previous record.

In early 2012, the radio station added ethnic programming to the broadcast schedule for the first time in several years, offering representation to the Chinese, Polish and Persian-speaking Iranian communities of Newcastle upon Tyne and Gateshead. A Spanish language broadcast was added at a later date

In February 2012, the station announced the award of a five-year extension to its community radio licence, taking the project through until June 2017. However, in April 2012, the station ceased FM broadcasts due to an issue with the location of the station's transmitter requiring a full move of broadcast equipment. Although the station declared on its website that operations were continuing as normal online during this downtime, the station was cited as in breach of its broadcast licence by Ofcom in June 2012. NE1fm successfully returned to 102.5 FM on 7 August 2012.

=== 2014–2019: Relocation to Westgate College and Tenth Birthday ===
Logo launched in June 2017 to celebrate the tenth birthday.

In October 2014, the station relocated from Virginia House to Westgate Community College, on the West side of Newcastle upon Tyne.

In June 2017, the station celebrated their 10th Birthday with a series of special broadcasts and the release of a new logo, shown below.

In February 2019, the radio station was taken over by a new Director for CBIT, planning to relocate, create a new management team along with a new programming schedule to enable the station to be self-sustaining. In February 2019, the station received a brand new logo, along with a brand new website.

This logo was used for only a short amount of time, from February to June 2019.

=== As Nova Radio North East ===
==== 2019–present ====
Unfortunately, the previous management takeover of NE1fm fell through, and was passed on once again. This time, the new management consisted of a team who already ran an online community station in the area, 'Nova Radio North East'.

In June 2019, these two stations were merged into one, forming the new 'Nova Radio North East 102.5FM'.

In 2022 the station was successfully awarded a five-year extension to its licence. The FM licence was later revoked, meaning the station now only broadcasts online.
