= Still Run (album) =

Studio album by Wet
- Released: July 13, 2018
- Recorded: 2017–18
- Genre: Indie pop
- Length: 40:47
- Label: Columbia
- Producers: Rostam Batmanglij; Andrew Sarlo; John Hill; Joe Valle; Kelly Zutrau; Loren Humphrey; Robert Ackroyd; Noah Beresin

Wet chronology
| Don't You (2016) | Still Run (2018) | Letter Blue (2021) |

Singles from Still Run
- 1. "There's a Reason" Released: March 9, 2018; 2. "Softens" Released: April 13, 2018; 3. "Lately" Released: May 11, 2018; 4. "You're Not Wrong" Released: June 22, 2018

Professional ratings
Aggregate scores
| Source | Rating |
|---|---|
| Album of the Year | 57/100 |
| Metacritic | 54/100 |
Review scores
| Source | Rating |
| Dork | 3/5 stars |
| Exclaim! | 6/10 |
| GIGsoup | 57% |
| The Irish Times | 2/5 stars |
| Pitchfork | 5.2/10 |

Still Run is the second studio album by American band Wet. It was released on July 13, 2018, by Columbia Records. It was announced on May 11, 2018, with the release of the third single off the album, "Lately". The first single off the album, "There's a Reason" was released on March 9, 2018. The same day, a US tour with Inc. No World was announced. The album was supported by four singles, "There's a Reason", "Softens", "Lately", and "You're Not Wrong". It is the band's first album without founding member Marty Sulkow, who left the band one year earlier due to "tensions mounted over artistic direction".

== Track listing ==
| No. | Title | Writer(s) | Producer(s) | Length |
|---|---|---|---|---|
| 1. | "Still Run" (featuring Starchild & The New Romantic) | Kelly Zutrau | Loren Humphrey; Joseph Valle; Zutrau | 3:37 |
| 2. | "There's a Reason" | Valle; Zutrau | Humphrey; Valle; Zutrau; Andrew Sarlo | 3:19 |
| 3. | "You're Not Wrong" | Zutrau | Rostam Batmanglij | 3:40 |
| 4. | "Lately" | Valle; Zutrau | Humphrey; Valle; Robert Ackroyd; John Hill | 3:52 |
| 5. | "Softens" | Valle; Zutrau | Valle; Zutrau; Sarlo | 5:45 |
| 6. | "11 Hours" | Zutrau | Valle; Zutrau; Noah Beresin | 3:08 |
| 7. | "This Woman Loves You" | Zutrau | Batmanglij | 3:23 |
| 8. | "Out of Tune" | Zutrau | Valle; Zutrau; Sarlo | 3:42 |
| 9. | "Visitor" | Valle; Zutrau | Valle; Zutrau; Beresin | 5:24 |
| 10. | "Love Is Not Enough" | Zutrau | Valle; Zutrau; Sarlo | 4:57 |
| Total length: | | | | 40:47 |

== Personnel ==
Credits adapted from Tidal and Instagram.

- Kelly Zutrau – vocals, producer, synthesizer, strings
- Joseph Valle – producer, engineer, acoustic guitar, electric guitar, programmer, strings, synthesizer, piano, bass, horn, organ
- Bryndon Cook (as Starchild & The New Romantic) – background vocals (track 1)
- Garo Yellin – cello (track 1)
- TJ Maiani – drums (track 1)
- Sam Geller – piano (track 1)
- Jesse Kotansky – strings, violin (track 1)
- Meg Duffy – acoustic guitar, electric guitar (track 2)
- Hamilton Berry – cello (tracks 2, 5, 9, 10), strings (track 9)
- Joey Waronker – drums (tracks 2, 8)
- Shane O'Connell – electric guitar (track 2), engineer (track 4, 5)
- Buddy Ross – piano, synthesizer (track 2, 8)
- Daniel Aged – steel guitar (tracks 2, 6, 8), bass (tracks 2, 6, 8, 9)
- Joe Santa Maria – saxophone (track 3)
- Chris Smith – keyboard, piano (tracks 4, 6), background vocals, guitar (track 6)
- Danny Meyer – Saxophone (track 4)
- Gabriel Smith – piano (track 4), drums (tracks 5, 9)
- Melody English – background vocals (track 5)
- Aerial East – background vocals (track 5, 6)
- Sam Geller – background vocals (track 5)
- Sean Tracy – acoustic guitar, electric guitar (tracks 5, 10), slide guitar (track 10)
- Amanda Lo – violin (track 5)
- Michael McTaggart – guitar (track 6)
- Lykke Li – background vocals (track 7)
- Oliver Hill – strings, viola, violin (track 8)
- James Richardson – slide guitar (track 9)
- Loren Humphrey – producer, engineer (tracks 1, 2, 4, 5 (engineer only)), drums (track 4)
- Andrew Sarlo – producer, engineer (tracks 2, 5, 8, 10)
- Rostam Batmanglij – producer, engineer, bass, electric guitar, piano, synthesizer (tracks 3, 7), mandolin, acoustic guitar, slide guitar (track 7)
- Robert Ackroyd – producer (track 4), electric guitar (track 8)
- John Hill – producer, electric guitar, programmer, synthesizer (track 4)
- Noah Beresin – producer (tracks 6, 9), piano (track 9)
- Logan Patrick – engineer (track 3)
- Nick Rowe – engineer (tracks 3, 7), mandolin (track 7)
- Rob Cohen – engineer (track 4)
- Quinn McCarthy – engineer (tracks 5, 6, 9)
- Rob Duffy – engineer (tracks 6, 8, 9)
- John Thayer – engineer (tracks 6, 9)
- David Schwerkolt – engineer (track 9)
- Tom Elmhirst – mixing
- Ted Jensen – mastering
- Brandon Bost – assistant engineer
- Bráulio Amado - design
- Brianna Capozzi - cover
- Amber Byrne Mahoney - insert photography

== Release history ==
List of release dates, showing region, format(s), label(s) and reference(s)
| Region | Date | Format(s) | Label(s) | Ref. |
|---|---|---|---|---|
| Various | July 13, 2018 | Vinyl; streaming; digital download | Columbia | |

== Charts ==
| Chart | Peak position |
|---|---|
| US Top Alternative Albums (Billboard) | 7 |
| Canadian Albums (Billboard) | 55 |
| US Top Rock Albums (Billboard) | 11 |
