= Poland (song) =

2022 single by Lil Yachty

Single by Lil Yachty
- Released: October 11, 2022
- Recorded: 2021–2022
- Genre: Comedy hip-hop; rage; novelty
- Length: 1:23
- Label: Quality Control; Motown
- Songwriters: Miles McCollum; Pierre Thevenot; Richard Ortiz; Ștefan Lician Cișmigiu
- Producers: F1lthy; Lukrative; Lucian

Lil Yachty singles chronology
"Slime Them" (2022)	"Poland" (2022)	"One of Those Days" (2023)

Music video
- "Poland" on YouTube

Audio sample
- A short sample of Lil Yachty singing the iconic chorus of the song: file; help

"Poland" is a song by American rapper Lil Yachty. It was released on October 11, 2022, through Quality Control Music and Motown Records.

== Background and release ==
Lil Yachty had been working on a "non-rap album" intended to be a "psychedelic alternative project", which he announced in January 2022. The song was originally recorded in 2021.

In October 2022, a snippet of "Poland" leaked to the Internet. Shortly after, the song was met with positive reception from listeners and other artists. Wiz Khalifa, DDG, and Denzel Curry were all cited as referencing the song in a positive manner. Drake, Steve Lacy, and Offset were also cited as posting videos of themselves listening to or singing along to the song. The song achieved virality, being popularly used on TikTok and spawning various Internet memes.

The song was officially released to all music streaming platforms on October 11, marking his first official solo track of 2022. @kurtoart, a Twitter user, drew art depicting Lil Yachty's fictional journey to Poland, accompanied by Wockhardt cough syrup (the "wock" referenced in the song's chorus). While the song's cover art was originally a map of Poland, shaded in a "cough-syrup purple," Yachty announced he would change the cover art to @kurtoart's drawing.

== Composition and lyrics ==
Produced by Lukrative, Lucian, and F1lthy of Working on Dying, the song features a synthy beat with a "cyber-vibrato" effect on Yachty's voice. A dissonant trap song, The Washington Post's Chris Richards wrote that "Yachty makes his voice — a melodized yawn that has chafed low-imagination rap purists from the start — do something new, elongating the most flexible syllables and allowing them to tremble with Auto-Tuned vibrato."

"Poland" has been noted by media outlets for its brevity and simple lyricism. In the song, Lil Yachty discusses "fiending" and battling his demons, and references the Nickelodeon comedy television series Kenan & Kel and its lead actors Kenan Thompson and Kel Mitchell. When going viral online, the lyric "I took the wock to Poland" was particularly singled out by listeners and garnered considerable media coverage. The term "wock" references Wockhardt, a pharmaceutical company known for producing types of cough syrup found in a cup of lean. Lil Yachty sings the lyric in "a manner somewhere between an operatic recitative and singing through a fan".

Prior to the release of "Poland", Yachty previously mentioned "wock" on his song "Wocky My Lover". The rapper has never performed in the country of Poland prior to the song's release, however the rapper revealed the mention of Poland in the song originally came about as trolling from the day when he had some wock and noticed someone else was drinking a Poland Spring water bottle.

In August 2023, Lil Yachty performed in Poland for the first time at the Open'er Festival in Gdynia, during which he performed "Poland" six consecutive times during his set. This follows a reported invitation of Yachty to Poland by the country's Prime Minister Mateusz Morawiecki, which was reportedly accepted by Quality Control CEO Pierre "Pee" Thomas who discussed arrangements to bring Yachty to Poland.

== Critical reception ==
The song was praised by music journalists for its simplicity, with many outlets calling the song a "catchy", "hypnotic", or "mystifying" earworm. (Note: Sources that share such an opinion include:) Its chorus featuring the "I took the wock to Poland" lyric was particularly lauded. Serge Selenou of Pitchfork opined that these factors are implemented in the rapper's best songs and wrote: "Over a churning F1lthy beat that wouldn't be out of place on Whole Lotta Red, Yachty croons 'I took the Wock to Poland' in a garbled yodel that probably has Mason Ramsey jealous"; Selenou added that the song helped recapture the "light-heartedness that won Yachty fans." In September 2024, Pitchfork included "Poland" on their list of "The 100 Best Songs of the 2020s So Far", ranking it at number 100.

Eric Skelton of Complex wrote that the hook on Poland is "so unique that we can't stop thinking about it," adding that Yachty's performance on the song is akin to "singing through a fan as he belts out 'I took the wock to Poland' with extra warble in his voice." Skelton called the song "bizarre", and added that "Poland" is "weird as hell, strangely addictive, and ridiculously fun to sing along with."

Chris Richards of the Washington Post praised the Auto-Tune vibrato effect applied to Yachty's voice, writing that "in this funny, freaky, emotionally extravagant, tragicomic gush, he sounds like a machine that's learned how to cry." Richards also positively received the song's concise nature, opining that "Yachty's brevity is casually artful, highly playful, and totally real."

== Recognition ==
On October 12, 2022, Quality Control Music CEO Pierre Thomas shared an alleged text conversation with Poland's Prime Minister Morawiecki. The conversation shows Morawiecki inviting Lil Yachty to Poland.

== Music video ==
An accompanying music video was produced by Lyrical Lemonade and released onto YouTube on October 11, 2022. Directed by Cole Bennett, the music video has received over 10.2 million views as of October 20. The video was filmed on the streets of Manhattan's SoHo neighborhood and in the Broadway–Lafayette Street/Bleecker Street station of the New York City Subway.

== Charts ==
Chart performance for "Poland"
Chart (2022–2023)	Peak position
Australia (ARIA)	49
Austria (Ö3 Austria Top 40)	53
Canada Hot 100 (Billboard)	15
Czech Republic Singles Digital (ČNS IFPI)	58
Germany (GfK)	52
Global 200 (Billboard)	29
Ireland (IRMA)	26
Lithuania (AGATA)	24
Netherlands (Single Tip)	3
New Zealand (Recorded Music NZ)	27
Slovakia (Singles Digitál Top 100)	35
South Africa Streaming (TOSAC)	19
Sweden (Sverigetopplistan)	70
Switzerland (Schweizer Hitparade)	62
UK Singles (Official Charts)	30
UK Hip Hop/R&B (Official Charts)	11
US Billboard Hot 100	40
US Hot R&B/Hip-Hop Songs (Billboard)	18

== Certifications ==
Region	Certification	Certified units/sales
Poland (ZPAV)	Gold	25,000^{‡}
United States (RIAA)	Gold	500,000^{‡}
^{‡} Sales+streaming figures based on certification alone.
