= Rabbit Run (Marten Creek tributary) =

Location
- Country: United States
- State: Montana
- County: Sanders County

Physical characteristics
- Source
  - location: Sanders County, Montana, United States
  - coordinates: 47°51′44″N 115°52′6″W
- Mouth
  - location: Sanders County, Montana, United States
  - coordinates: 47°53′14″N 115°52′14″W
  - elevation: 2,913 ft (888 m)

Rabbit Run (the United States)
Rabbit Run (Montana)

Rabbit Run is a tributary of Marten Creek in Sanders County, Montana in the United States.

== Statistics ==
The Geographic Name Information System I.D. is 789315.
