= Neon Gold Records =

American music record label

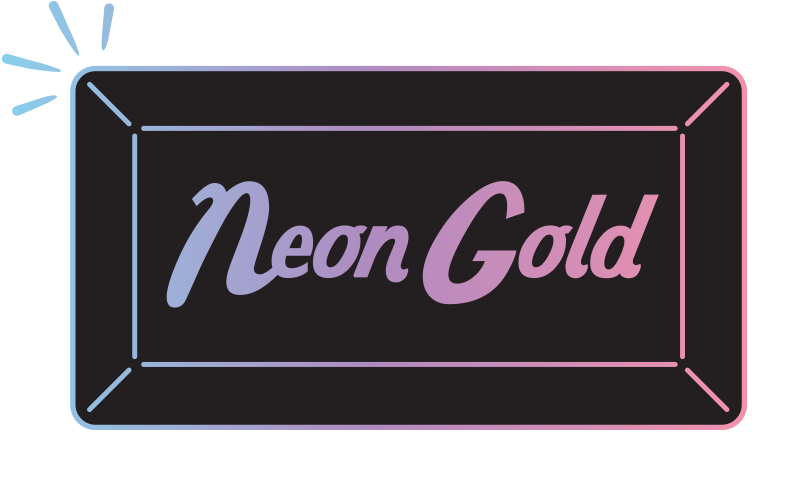
- Founded: 2008
- Founder: Derek Davies; Lizzy Plapinger
- Distributor: Virgin Music Group
- Genre: Alternative pop
- Country of origin: U.S., U.K.
- Location: New York City
- Official website: neon.gold

Neon Gold Records is a New York City-based boutique record label founded in 2008 by Derek Davies and Lizzy Plapinger.

Initially operating as a vinyl-only singles label, Neon Gold has launched the debut releases and international careers of many acts including Passion Pit, Ellie Goulding, Marina, Gotye, Christine and the Queens, Charli XCX, Matt Maeson and Tove Lo. Beyond their own roster, Neon Gold are often credited with the discovery and initial support of a number of other successful artists including Vampire Weekend, Lana Del Rey, CHVRCHES, Grouplove and Walk the Moon.

Since 2024, Neon Gold has operated as a subsidiary of Virgin Music Group.

== History ==
On 8 December 2010, Neon Gold signed a joint venture with Columbia Records, enabling them to graduate to full-length releases through Columbia and RED Distribution Through the venture with Columbia, the label signed and released debut albums from St. Lucia, HAIM, and Magic Man.

In January 2014, the label embarked on a new venture with Atlantic Records, where they made Charli XCX's sophomore record for release through Neon Gold/Atlantic that fall. The deal made Neon Gold an imprint label under Atlantic – co-chaired by Julie Greenwald and Craig Kallman, who oversaw similar Atlantic imprints Fueled By Ramen and Canvasback.

In June 2024 it was announced that Neon Gold Records releases would be distributed by Virgin Music Group, a company of Universal Music Group.

== Neon Gold Live ==
Neon Gold also runs a successful promotions arm, operating popular monthly club nights in New York City, London, and Los Angeles, and producing approximately 100 events a year in addition to their flagship annual showcases at South by Southwest, CMJ and The Great Escape Festival.

Launched at Tammany Hall in New York City's Lower East Side in 2011, the monthly club night Popshop is the primary outlet of the Neon Gold Live operation, and has since expanded to new venues and cities.

As of 2020, Neon Gold hosts monthly events in the following cities:

- New York – Popshop NYC at Baby's All Right
- Los Angeles – Popshop West at The Moroccan Lounge

== Artists ==
=== Current ===
- Broods
- Charli XCX
- Christine and the Queens
- Jax Anderson
- Matt Maeson
- Mollie Elizabeth
- Winona Oak
- Lykke Li
- Noga Erez
- Oscar and the Wolf
- Pussy Riot
- St. Lucia
- The Knocks
- Tove Lo
- Your Smith

=== Past ===
- Alex Winston
- ANR
- ASTR
- Ellie Goulding
- Fort Lean
- Foxes
- Gotye
- Great Good Fine OK
- HAERTS
- Haim
- Icona Pop
- Jessica Morgan
- Little Red
- Magic Man
- MARINA
- Miami Horror
- Monarchy
- Monica Birkenes
- MØ
- Passion Pit
- Penguin Prison
- Polarsets
- POP ETC
- Ryn Weaver
- Savoir Adore
- Seinabo Sey
- Sir Sly
- Starsmith
- Strange Talk
- The Naked and Famous
- The Sound of Arrows
- Wet
- Wildcat! Wildcat!

== See also ==
- Frenchkiss Records
- XL Recordings
