= Fort Lean =

American rock band

- Origin: Brooklyn, NY United States
- Genre: Indie Rock
- Years active: 2011–present
- Members: Keenan Mitchell - Vocals, Guitar; Zach Fried - Guitar; Will Runge - Keyboard, Guitar; Jake Aron - Bass; Sam Ubl - Drums
- Website: www.fortlean.com

Fort Lean is an American rock band from Brooklyn, New York.

The band released their self-released eponymous EP on April 13, 2011. They released three singles and music videos from the EP; "Perfect", "High Definition", and "Beach Holiday". The band released a 7" on Neon Gold Records on February 28, 2012 featuring single, "Sunsick" and B-side, "The Precinct." They received significant critical praise for their 2011 CMJ performances, with the New York Times stating on the first day of the festival, "Fort Lean is already a standout at CMJ".

The band released a new EP, Change Your Name, on November 13, 2012. They received praise from MTV Buzzworthy and The A.V. Club for the songs "All The Lights" and "The Mall."

Fort Lean released their first LP, Quiet Day, on October 2, 2015, on Ooh La La Records. The first single from that record, "Cut To The Chase," premiered on Stereogum on October 15, 2014.
