= Rabbit Run (Turkey Creek tributary) =

Location
- Country: United States
- State: Ohio
- County: Scioto County

Physical characteristics
- Source
  - location: Scioto County, Ohio, United States
  - coordinates: 38°41′10″N 83°7′17″W
- Mouth
  - location: Scioto County, Ohio, United States
  - coordinates: 38°41′31″N 83°5′27″W
  - elevation: 538 ft (164 m)

Rabbit Run (the United States)
Rabbit Run (Ohio)

Rabbit Run is a tributary of Turkey Creek in Scioto County, Ohio in the United States.

== Statistics ==
The Geographic Name Information System I.D. is 1044837.
