= Chairlift (band) =

American synth-pop band

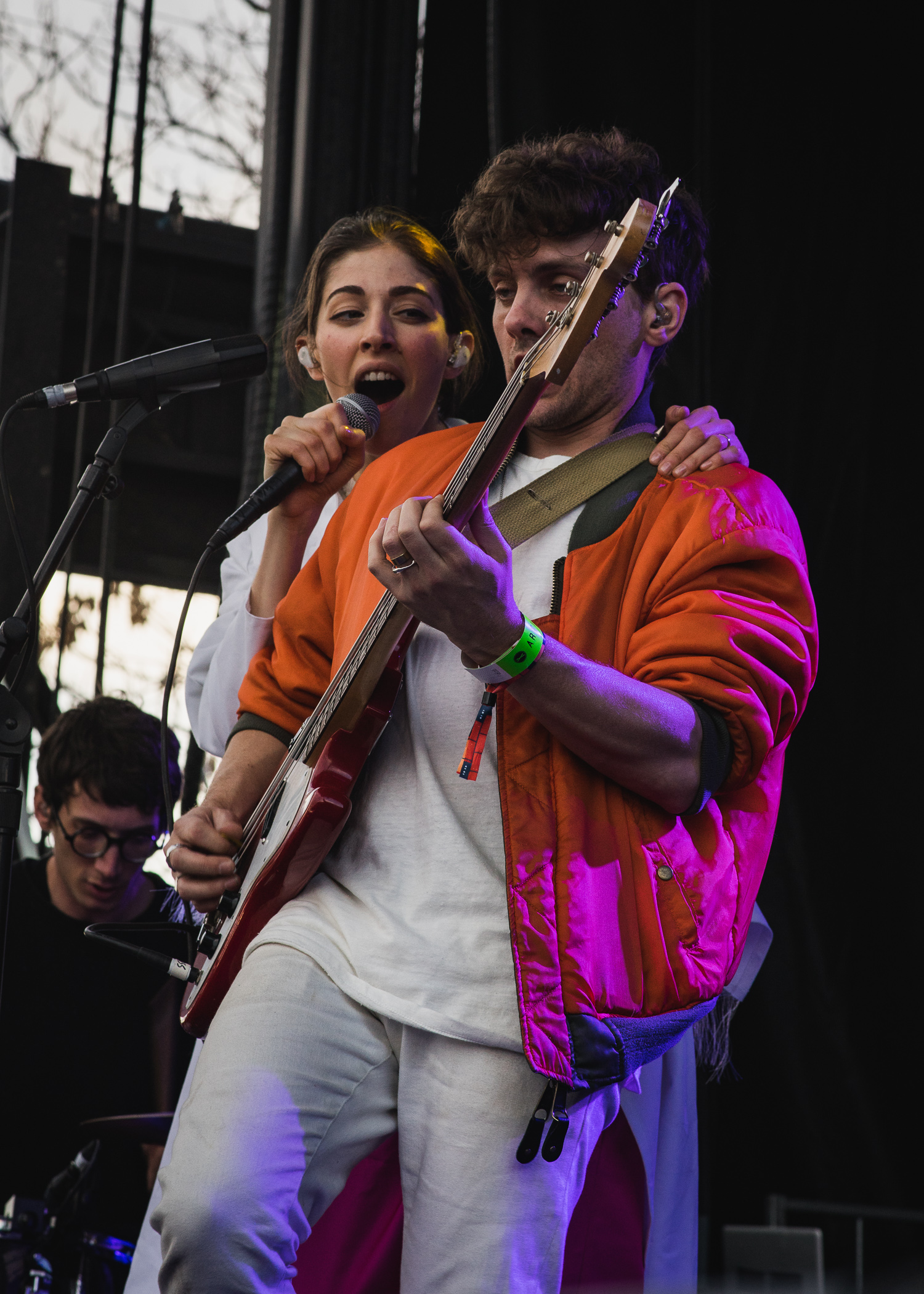
- Chairlift performing in 2016

Background information
- Origin: Boulder, Colorado, United States
- Genres: Indie pop; indie rock; synth-pop; electropop; art pop; dream pop; avant-pop; experimental pop; indie R&B; new wave revival
- Years active: 2005–2017
- Labels: Kanine; Terrible; Young Turks; Columbia
- Past members: Caroline Polachek; Aaron Pfenning; Patrick Wimberly
- Website: chairlifted.com

Chairlift was an American synth-pop band formed by Caroline Polachek and Aaron Pfenning. They formed the band in 2005 while living in Boulder, Colorado, and Patrick Wimberly joined them when they moved to Brooklyn, New York, in 2007. The three released their debut album Does You Inspire You in 2008. Pfenning left the band in 2010, and the new duo released two more albums—2012's Something and 2016's Moth—before announcing the end of Chairlift in December 2016.

== History ==
Chairlift formed initially as a project between Aaron Pfenning and Caroline Polachek at the University of Colorado in October 2005. The group intended to make background music for haunted houses. Along with bassist Kyle McCabe, Chairlift recorded the beginning of Daylight Savings EP at New Monkey Studio in Los Angeles, California, in April 2006. Chairlift relocated to Williamsburg, Brooklyn, in August 2006 and signed to Kanine Records in June 2007. Patrick Wimberly joined the group in early 2007. After writing and recording while Polachek was still in college, Chairlift released their first full-length album, Does You Inspire You, in 2008. Their song "Bruises" was featured in the 2008 Apple commercial that launched the fourth-generation iPod Nano. The single "Evident Utensil" was nominated for an award in the "Breakthrough Video" category at the 2009 MTV Video Music Awards. The album was rereleased by Columbia Records on April 21, 2009, after the band signed with the major label. The re-release included two additional tracks not on the original release and a longer version of "Make Your Mind Up". Chairlift went on their first international tour, opening for bands like Phoenix, The Killers, and MGMT.

Pfenning left Chairlift in 2010 to pursue his solo career under the name Rewards.

On September 7, 2011, they released the video to their single "Amanaemonesia" from their second album Something. For their 2012 single "Met Before" Chairlift created an interactive, choose-your-own-adventure video that BuzzFeed awarded the number one spot on its "23 Best Music Videos of 2012" end-of-year round up. Their sophomore album Something released via Columbia Records on January 24, 2012. Something features production from Dan Carey and Alan Moulder. After the record was released in Japan, Polachek co-directed a video for a Japanese version of "I Belong In Your Arms" with director/animator Eric Epstein.

Through the time Polachek was finishing her solo record Arcadia, Chairlift continued working on their third record, Moth. Moth was released January 22, 2016 and featured 10 new songs, including the single "Ch-Ching".

In December 2016, Chairlift announced that they would be breaking up, with a final tour occurring in the spring of 2017. Polachek has since continued with her solo career and Wimberly continues to produce for other artists.

== Discography ==
=== Studio albums ===
Title	Details	Peak chart positions								
Title	Details	US	US Heat	US Rock	US Indie	AUS	BEL (FL) Heat	BEL (FL) Alt.	UK	UK Indie
Does You Inspire You	Released: July 22, 2008; Label: Kanine Records; Formats:	—	—	—	—	—	—	—	—	—
Something	Released: January 24, 2012; Label: Kanine, Columbia Records, Young Turks; Formats:	184	5	47	29	45	3	38	131	15
Moth	Released: January 22, 2016; Label: Columbia Records; Formats:	—	7	32	—	—	—	—	—	—

=== EPs ===
Title	Details
Daylight Savings	Released: June 2007; Label: Self-released
Chairlift at 6:15	Released: October 28, 2012; Label: Young Turks, Kanine; Formats: Vinyl, digital download

=== Singles ===
List of singles as lead artist, with selected chart positions and certifications, showing year released and album name
Title	Year	Peak chart positions								Album
Title	Year	US Bub.	AUS	BEL (FL) Tip	CAN	GER	MEX	SWI	UK	Album
"Evident Utensil"	2007	—	—	—	—	—	—	—	—	Does You Inspire You
"Bruises"	2008	1	72	5	80	63	34	89	50	Does You Inspire You
"Always Crashing in the Same Car"	2010	—	—	—	—	—	48	—	—	Non-album single
"Amanaemonesia"	2011	—	—	—	—	—	48	—	—	Something
"Met Before"	2012	—	—	—	—	—	—	—	—	Something
"I Belong in Your Arms"	2012	—	—	—	—	—	—	—		Something
"Ghost Tonight"	2012	—	—	35	—	—	—	—	—	Something
"I Belong in Your Arms" (Japanese version)	2012	—	—	—	—	—	—	—	—	Non-album single
"Ch-Ching"	2015	—	—	—	—	—	—	—	—	Moth
"Romeo"	2015	—	—	—	—	—	—	—	—	Moth
"Crying in Public"	2016	—	—	—	—	—	—	—	—	Moth
"Moth To the Flame"	2016	—	—	—	—	—	—	—	—	Moth
"Ch-Ching (Redux)" (featuring DRAM and Jimi Tents)	2016	—	—	—	—	—	—	—	—	Non-album singles
"Get Real"	2016	—	—	—	—	—	—	—	—	Non-album singles
"—" denotes a recording that did not chart or was not released in that territory.

=== Remixes ===
- Glasser – "Apply (Chairlift Remix)" (2012)
- Phoenix – "Fences (Chairlift Remix)" (2012)
- Indochine – "College Boy (Chairlift Remix)" (2013)
