= Wet (band) =

American indie pop band

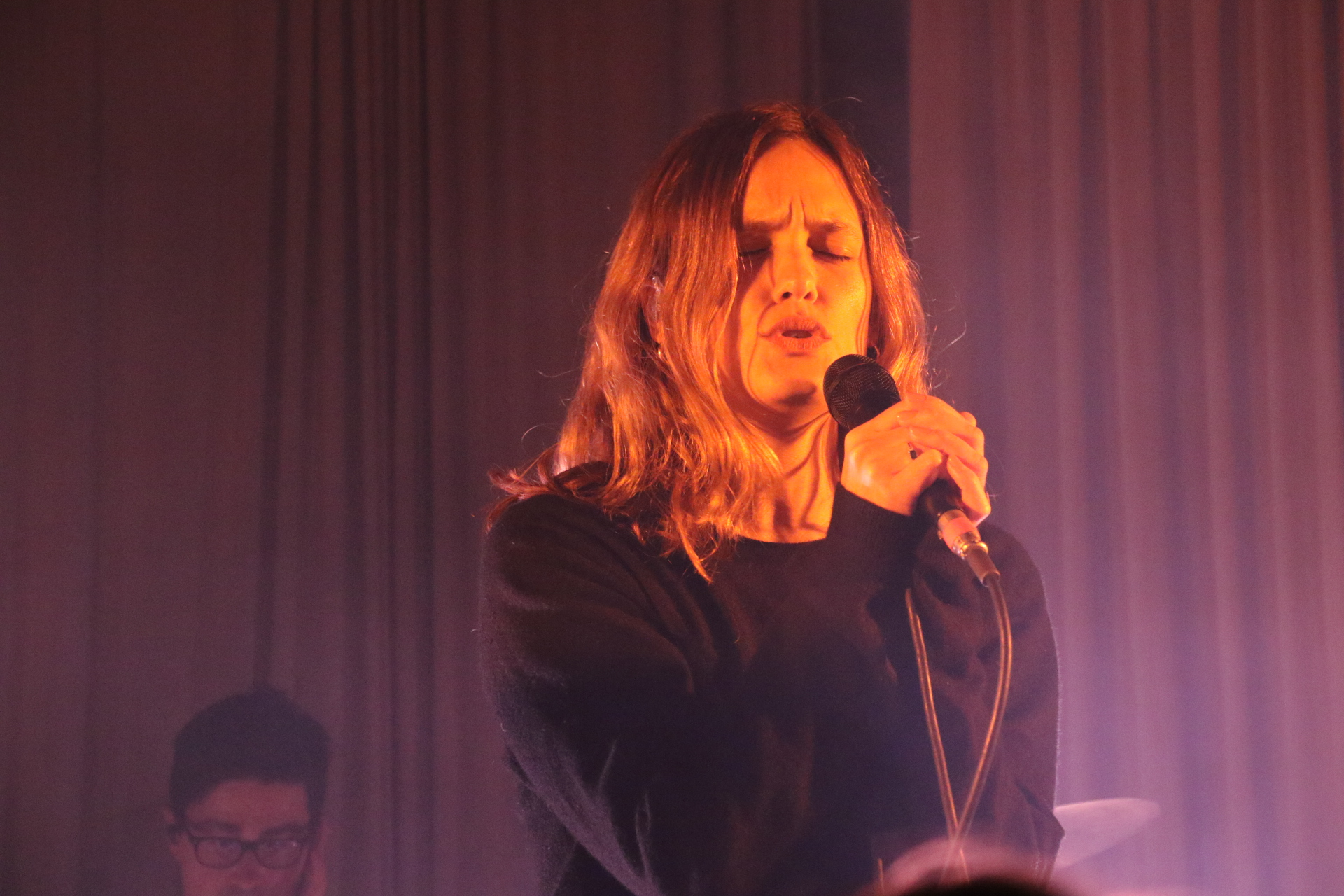
- Kelly Zutrau of Wet performing in March 2019

Background information
- Origin: Brooklyn, New York, U.S.
- Genres: Indie pop; indietronica; alternative R&B; dream pop; synth-pop
- Years active: 2012–present
- Labels: Columbia; AWAL
- Spinoff of: Beauty Feast
- Members: Kelly Zutrau; Joe Valle; Marty Sulkow (2012-2017;2021-present)
- Website: wet.band

Wet is an American indie pop group from Brooklyn, New York. The band's first two albums—the 2013 self-titled EP and 2016 Don't You—are credited to Kelly Zutrau, Joe Valle, and Marty Sulkow. In March 2018, Wet released a single, "There's a Reason", as a duo of Zutrau and Valle. Signed to Columbia Records, Wet was named the most promising group in music by The Fader in 2015.

== History ==
Members Kelly Zutrau, Joe Valle, and Marty Sulkow met in New York through mutual friends while Sulkow and Valle were attending New York University and Zutrau was a student at Cooper Union. Sulkow and Zutrau formed a band called Beauty Feast in 2007. It grew to seven members but eventually dissolved. Zutrau went on to the Rhode Island School of Design, but continued to write music. Sulkow and Valle became involved with her work and in 2012 the group moved in together in Sulkow's apartment in Bedford–Stuyvesant, Brooklyn.

=== Neon Gold and Wet ===
The group began booking gigs around Brooklyn and posting music online, gaining attention around 2013. Wet signed with the boutique record label Neon Gold during that same year. Neon Gold had a partnership with Columbia Records at the time Wet signed with them. The label switched its partnership to Atlantic Records in 2014 and Wet subsequently signed with Columbia after fielding offers from numerous major labels. On September 24, Neon Gold announced that Wet would be releasing a self-titled extended play. It was released on October 3 and October 15 on the band's Bandcamp page.

=== Don't You ===
The group moved to Western Massachusetts in 2014 where they began working on their debut album under Columbia. The album, titled Don't You, was released on January 29, 2016. It reached number 76 on the Billboard 200 and number 55 on the Canadian Albums Chart.

In October 2016, the band released a pair of singles, "The Middle" and "Turn Away".

=== Still Run ===
Following Sulkow's departure in 2017 due to creative differences, Wet released the single "There's a Reason" in March 2018 as a duo consisting of Zutrau and Valle; Andrew Sarlo is also credited as a producer. On April 13, 2018, the band released "Softens", the second song from their then-upcoming second studio album, Still Run.

=== Letter Blue ===
Sulkow rejoined Wet in 2021 for their third studio album, Letter Blue, released on October 22, 2021, by AWAL, after the band parted ways with Columbia Records.

=== Two Lives ===
On June 21st 2024, Wet released Double, the first single of their latest album Two lives. On April 4th 2025, the full album was released.

The album received some acclaim from critics. According to Chicago newsroom Reader, the album acts "an excavation of memory as well as an earnest quest for wholeness, safety, and certainty through life transitions". Lead singer Zutrau's own experiences dealing with an unexpected pregnancy was a large inspiration towards the production and writing of the album. Zutrau asks, "How could I possibly risk trusting someone enough to have a baby with them and risk what kind of parent I would be?" stating that this question is a "big part" of what Two Lives is all about.

== Members ==
- Kelly Zutrau – lead vocals
- Joe Valle – production
- Marty Sulkow – guitar (2012–2017, 2021–present)

== Discography ==
=== Studio albums ===
Title	Details	Peaks			
Title	Details	US	AUS	CAN	UK
Don't You	Released: January 29, 2016; Label: Columbia; Formats: CD, LP, digital download, streaming	76	77	55	184
Still Run	Released: July 13, 2018; Label: Columbia; Formats: LP, digital download, streaming	—	—	55	—
Letter Blue	Released: October 22, 2021; Label: AWAL; Formats: LP, digital download, streaming	—	—	—	—
Two Lives	Released: April 4, 2025; Label: Other Exotica, LLC. under exclusive license to 30SF; Formats: LP, digital download, streaming	—	—	—	—
"—" denotes a recording that did not chart or was not released in that territory.

=== Extended plays ===
Title	Details
Wet	Released: October 3, 2013; Label: Neon Gold; Formats: 10-inch vinyl, digital download, streaming
Letter Blue (reprise)	Released: April 15, 2022; Label: Other Exotica, LLC. under exclusive license to 30SF; Formats: Digital download, streaming
Pink Room	Released: July 8, 2022; Label: Friends Of / Secretly Canadian; Formats: 12-inch vinyl, digital download, streaming

=== Singles ===
Title	Details
"The Middle" / "Turn Away"	Released: October 21, 2016; Label: Columbia; Formats: Digital download, streaming, cassette
"There's a Reason"	Released: March 9, 2018; Label: Columbia; Formats: 12-inch vinyl, digital download, streaming
"Softens"	Released: April 13, 2018; Label: Columbia; Formats: Digital download, streaming
"Lately"	Released: May 11, 2018; Label: Columbia; Formats: Digital download, streaming
"Old Bone / Trust No Man"	Released: February 15, 2019; Label: Columbia; Formats: Digital download, streaming
"This Fog"	Released: March 20, 2020; Label: Columbia; Formats: Digital download, streaming
"Come to You"	Released: May 7, 2020; Label: Columbia; Formats: Digital download, streaming
"On Your Side"	Released: June 16, 2021; Label: Other Exotica, LLC. under exclusive license to 30SF; Foemats: Digital download, streaming
"Larabar"	Released: August 4, 2021; Label: Other Exotica, LLC. under exclusive license to 30SF; Formats: Digital download, streaming
"Clementine"	Released: September 1, 2021; Label: Other Exotica, LLC. under exclusive license to 30SF; Formats: Digital download, streaming
"Far Cry"	Released: September 29, 2021; Label: Other Exotica, LLC. under exclusive license to 30SF; Formats: Digital download, streaming
"Bound (with Blood Orange)"	Released: October 20, 2021; Label: Other Exotica, LLC. under exclusive license to 30SF; Formats: Digital download, streaming
"Where Did the Day Go"	Released: April 13, 2022; Label: Other Exotica, LLC. under exclusive license to 30SF; Formats: Digital download, streaming
"Double"	Released: June 21, 2024; Label: 30SF; Formats: Digital download, streaming
"Rosy"	Released: September 27, 2024; Label: 30SF; Formats: Digital download, streaming
"Signs"	Released: October 25, 2024; Label: 30SF; Formats: Digital download, streaming
"Are You Willing"	Released: September 16, 2026; Label: Other Exotica, LLC.; Formats: Digital download, streaming
