= Rabbit Run (Doe Creek tributary) =

Location
- Country: United States
- State: Indiana
- County: Putnam County

Physical characteristics
- Source
  - location: Putnam County, Indiana, United States
  - coordinates: 39°31′35″N 86°47′4″W
- Mouth
  - location: Putnam County, Indiana, United States
  - coordinates: 39°30′13″N 86°48′15″W
  - elevation: 712 ft (217 m)

Rabbit Run (the United States)
Rabbit Run (Indiana)

Rabbit Run is a tributary of Doe Creek in Putnam County, Indiana in the United States.

== Statistics ==
The Geographic Name Information System I.D. is 441709.
