= Rabbit Run Creek (Little Blue River tributary) =

Location
- Country: United States
- State: Nebraska
- County: Adams County

Physical characteristics
- Source
  - location: Webster County, Nebraska, United States
  - coordinates: 40°17′19″N 98°30′50″W
- Mouth
  - location: Adams County, Nebraska, United States
  - coordinates: 40°24′5″N 98°29′16″W
  - elevation: 1,837 ft (560 m)

Rabbit Run (the United States)
Rabbit Run (Nebraska)

Rabbit Run Creek is a tributary of Little Blue River in Adams County, Nebraska in the United States.

== Statistics ==
The Geographic Name Information System I.D. is 832430.
