= Polarsets =

Four-piece-band from Newcastle upon Tyne, England

- Origin: Newcastle upon Tyne, England
- Genres: Indie; Electronic; Dance; Pop
- Years active: 2009-2016
- Label: Kitsuné Musique|Neon Gold Records
- Members: James Rudd; Rob Howe; Mike Smith; Carmen Ledda Green
- Website: polarsets.com

Polarsets are a four-piece band from Newcastle upon Tyne, England. They have released an album, Parasols, an EP and a number of singles.

== Career ==
Polarsets were a band from Newcastle upon Tyne, United Kingdom.

After a winter of writing, Polarsets recorded the 'Leave Argentina' single, which was released in early 2010 on Bandcamp. Both this track and its B-side 'Just Don't Open Your Eyes Yet' quickly gained national support and the band were invited to London for an interview with Tom Robinson on BBC Radio 6. They were also selected to open the Main Stage of the Evolution Festival in Newcastle in 2010. The single 'Morning' was released on Bandcamp in late 2010 and later became a surprise hit in Colombia, South America.

In April 2011, the band released their second official single 'Sunshine Eyes' on Kitsuné Records, also included on the compilation 'Kitsuné Maison 11'. The Jensen Sportag's remix of the track also appeared on Kitsuné's Club Night mix. Sunshine Eyes has enjoyed considerable play on BBC Radio 1, where Zane Lowe made the track his 'Next Hype' in May 2011. Polarsets also played the BBC Introducing stage at the Radio 1 Big Weekend 2011. In June 2011, Polarsets supported Two Door Cinema Club at the Wedgewood Rooms in Portsmouth.

The band released their first EP entitled 'Exotica' in June 2011. In August 2011, the band released the single 'Morning' with B-Side 'Sunset' on 7" Vinyl through Neon Gold Records. Jaymo & Andy George's label Moda handled the digital release of Morning in September 2011. Polarsets then went on tour in many European cities and finished the summer playing at Soma Festival in Bogota. They also played at Neon Gold shows in New York and Washington DC. In 2012, they performed at South by South West (SXSW) in Austin, Texas - officially at the Neon Gold showcase and unofficially in two other venues.

Over the course of 2014, Carmen Ledda Green joined to band on vocals and keyboards. Their debut album Parasols was released 22 September 2014.

The band's social media accounts have been inactive since 2016, leading many to speculate that they combusted unintentionally around that time.
