= Toyger =

Breed of cat

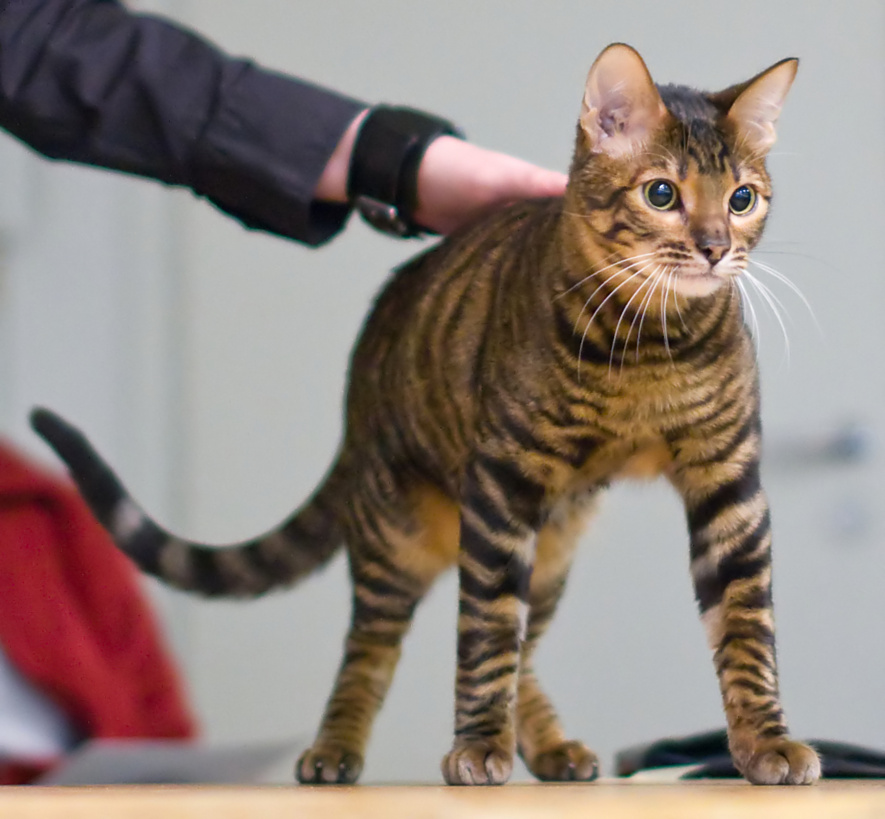
- Origin: United States

Breed standards
- TICA: standard
- GCCF: standard
- LOOF: standard

The toyger is a breed of domestic cat, the result of breeding domestic short-haired tabbies (beginning in the 1980s) to make them resemble a "toy tiger", as its striped coat is reminiscent of the tiger's. The breed's originator, Judy Sugden, has stated that the breed was developed in order to inspire people to care about the conservation of tigers in the wild. It was recognized for "registration only" by The International Cat Association in the early 2000s, and advanced through all requirements to be accepted as a full championship breed in May 2007. The Toyger Cat Society database lists 30 active Toyger breeders as of 2024.

In 2020, 469 toygers are registered on the Pawpeds Database, and kittens were stated to cost up to $5,000.

== History ==
The breed began development in the 1980s in the U.S. when Judy Sugden, a breeder looking to clarify the mackerel markings in tabbies, noticed distinctive markings in one of her cats. These tiny spots occurring on the temples of the face (an area normally devoid of distinct pattern) proved genetically that the circular tiger face pattern could be possible in a domestic cat. After importing a tom from the streets of India with noticeable spotting breaking up the usual tabby lines on the top of the head, the quest to develop a toy-tiger began in earnest. About forty domestic cats from various countries were selected over several years as foundation stock, including Bengals, unpedigreed domestic short-haired cats with stripes, and at least one cat imported from India for its ear markings; each provided a specific desired trait or reinforcing ones already chosen (especially the striped appearance).

Judy Sugden was the daughter of Jean Mill (maiden name Jean Sugden), who succeeded in creating the Domestic Bengal cat.

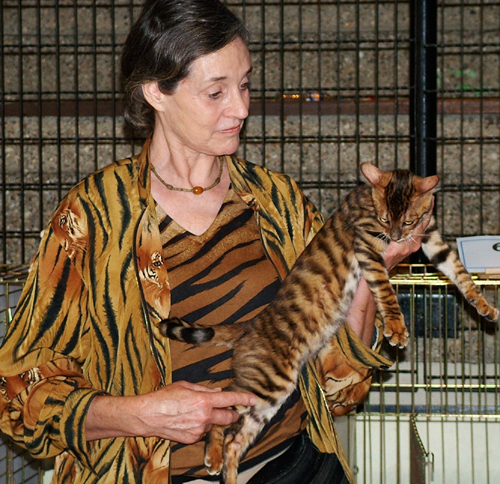
Judy Sudgen in French TICA show 2007

In 1993, TICA accepted the Toyger for Registration and in 2000 advanced them to new breed exhibition classes, granting them full recognition as a championship breed in February 2007.

Carole Baskin, a conservationist and the owner of Big Cat Rescue, has referred to Toyger owners as "selfish" and said that creating new breeds in general is "strapping a nuclear warhead to the feral cat problem".

In 2020, TICA recognized Toyger Club as a TICA chartered club.

== Breed standards ==
The following is adapted from the 2008 TICA breed standard for the Toyger:

- Head shape: Medium-sized, with a dominant deep, skewed, cylindrical muzzle on an oval head.
- Ears: Small and round. Wide set toward the back of the head and oriented on a 45 degree line towards the center of the eyes. Short but thickly furred temples and ears are preferred. Lynx tipping is undesirable.
- Eyes: Medium, circular with gentle hooding of upper inside. Set wide apart, back into face, and on a slight bias toward the base of the ear. Rich deep color preferred.
- Muzzle: Well-defined, long, broad, and deep with rounded muscular contours. Full face view suggests an inverted heart shape. The front muzzle line/plane is skewed forward to produce a more frontal view of nose leather, mouth, and chin than in most small felines.
- Nose: Muscular, long, broad, and rounded, widening toward the end to at least as wide as the space between the eyes.
- Torso: Medium to deep, long and muscular with rounded contours; strong and robust but not blocky.
- Legs and feet: Medium length such that the space between the ground and the body is roughly equal to the depth of the torso. Boning is very large.
- Tail: Very long and not thick. Taper is slight with blunt, rounded tip. Fur is dense and short.
- Musculature: Very muscular and athletic looking, especially in young males.
- Coat length: Coat is uniformly short. Fur may be longer in the temple jowl/ruff; the suggestion of more of a ruff is preferred.
- Color: Markings shall be virtually black to brown to even tan. Very dark markings are preferred. A bright pumpkin ground color with very dark markings is preferred. Whited ground color shall be as uniformly light to virtually white as possible.
- Markings pattern: Mackerel tabby. The markings to the ground pattern contrast must be extreme and distinct, giving a clear, sharply edged pattern.
- Body markings: Body stripes shall generally be vertically aligned with encircling markings on neck, legs, and tail. Bold, braided, and non-uniform stripes are preferred. Belly and inside of legs must be marked. Paw pads and tail tip must be black.
- Head: Facial stripes and markings shall be circularly aligned around the face. Traditional tabby markings moving radially away from the face for any distance are undesirable and has an "M" marking on its forehead. Lighter to virtually white "thumb marks" on the back of the ears are desirable. Natural "make-up" look is important: eyes must have black mascara-like markings and whited spectacles; desirable for mouth to have black lipstick markings.

== See also ==
- Bengal cat § Derived breeds – there are several other Bengal-based crossbreeds
- Ocicat, a spotted breed that is not a domestic–wild hybrid
