= Something (Chairlift album) =

Studio album by Chairlift
- Released: January 24, 2012
- Genres: Synth rock; indie rock; pop
- Length: 41:39
- Labels: Kanine; Columbia; Young Turks (UK)
- Producers: Dan Carey and Alan Moulder

Chairlift chronology
Does You Inspire You (2008)	Something (2012)	Moth (2016)

Singles from Something
- 1. "Amanaemonesia" Released: August 16, 2011; 2. "Sidewalk Safari" Released: October 18, 2011; 3. "Met Before" Released: November 30, 2011

Something is the second album by the American indie band Chairlift in the United States via Columbia Records on January 24, 2012, and in the United Kingdom via Young Turks on January 23, 2012. The first album since founding member Aaron Pfenning left the band in 2010, Something features production from Dan Carey and Alan Moulder. The first single, "Amanaemonesia", was released as a 7" on August 16, 2011, via Terrible Records. In March 2012, an interactive video for "Met Before" was released. The video, directed by Jordan Fish, allows the viewer to determine the direction the main character takes.

In discussing the musical influences on the album, lead singer Caroline Polachek mentioned Strawberry Switchblade, Bill Nelson, Yellow Magic Orchestra, OMD and Art of Noise, along with black metal and Japanese classical music.

== Reception ==
Professional ratings
Aggregate scores
Source	Rating
Metacritic	76/100
Review scores
Source	Rating
The A.V. Club	A−
Boston Phoenix	3.5/4 stars
Consequence of Sound	3.5/5 stars
musicOMH	4/5 stars
NME	7/10
Pitchfork	8/10
PopMatters	7/10
Slant Magazine	4/5 stars
Spin	7/10
Sputnikmusic	(great)

Something has been well received by music critics. In its first week, Something reached No. 184 on the Billboard 200 chart and No. 5 on the Top Heatseekers chart.

The album was listed ninth on Stereogum's list of top 50 albums of 2012.

"I Belong in Your Arms" was ranked 95th tracks in the 200 Best Tracks of the Decade So Far in 2014 by Pitchfork.

== Track listing ==
All tracks are written by Chairlift (Caroline Polachek, Patrick Wimberly). Additional co-writers listed below.

No.	Title	Writer(s)	Length
1.	"Sidewalk Safari"	Kurt Feldman	3:50
2.	"Wrong Opinion"		5:06
3.	"I Belong in Your Arms"	Benjamin Ruttner; James Patterson; Andrew Harr; Jermaine Jackson	3:27
4.	"Take It Out on Me"		3:54
5.	"Ghost Tonight"		3:07
6.	"Cool as a Fire"	Jorge Elbrecht	3:58
7.	"Amanaemonesia"		5:00
8.	"Met Before"		2:54
9.	"Frigid Spring"		3:49
10.	"Turning"	Feldman	3:00
11.	"Guilty as Charged"		3:34
Total length:			41:39

Something – Japanese edition (bonus track)
No.	Title	Length
12.	"Grown Up Blues"	3:18
13.	"Peculiar Paradise"	4:57
14.	"Silica"	3:30
15.	"I Belong In Your Arms (Japanese Version)"	3:29
Total length:		56:53

== Charts ==
Chart (2012)	Peak position
Australian Albums (ARIA)	45
Belgian Alternative Albums (Ultratop Flanders)	38
Belgian Heatseekers Albums (Ultratop Flanders)	3
UK Albums (Official Charts)	131
UK Independent Albums (Official Charts)	15
US Billboard 200	184
US Heatseekers Albums (Billboard)	5
US Independent Albums (Billboard)	29
US Top Rock Albums (Billboard)	47
