= Does You Inspire You =

Studio album by Chairlift
- Released: July 22, 2008
- Genres: Indie pop; dream pop; electronic
- Length: 43:50 (original release); 52:04 (2009 reissue)
- Labels: Kanine; Columbia
- Producer: Britt Myers

Chairlift chronology
| Does You Inspire You (2008) | Something (2012) |

Does You Inspire You is the debut studio album by American indie band Chairlift, released on July 22, 2008, on Kanine Records and reissued in 2009 by Columbia Records.

== Release ==
After briefly going out of print on its original Kanine Records label, the album was re-released by Columbia Records on April 21, 2009, with two additional tracks not included on the original release and a longer version of "Make Your Mind Up". The lead single "Bruises" was featured in an iPod commercial, and the video for "Evident Utensil" was nominated for an award in the "Breakthrough Video" category at the 2009 MTV Video Music Awards.

== Critical reception ==
Professional ratings
Aggregate scores
| Source | Rating |
|---|---|
| Metacritic | 68/100 |
Review scores
| Source | Rating |
| AllMusic | 4/5 stars |
| The Guardian | 3/5 stars |
| NME | 8/10 stars |
| Pitchfork | (5.6/10) |
| Prefix | (7.5/10) |
| Robert Christgau | (choice cut) |
| Rolling Stone | 3.5/5 stars |
| Spin | 4/5 stars |

Does You Inspire You received mostly positive reviews from contemporary music critics. At Metacritic, which assigns a normalized rating out of 100 to reviews from mainstream critics, the album received an average score of 68, based on 16 reviews, which indicates "generally favorable reviews".

Alex Miller of NME praised the album stating, "Swathed as it is in the kind of '80s arrangements of flutes and chiming guitars that have rarely been allowed beyond Carol Decker's lushest, most velveteen fantasies, this album is an open goal to accusations of trend-following revivalism."

As of April 2009 the album has sold 11,000 copies in United States.

== Track listing ==
All tracks are written by and arranged by Chairlift.

| No. | Title | Length |
|---|---|---|
| 1. | "Garbage" | 4:43 |
| 2. | "Planet Health" | 4:17 |
| 3. | "Earwig Town" | 3:02 |
| 4. | "Bruises" | 4:00 |
| 5. | "Somewhere Around Here" | 4:30 |
| 6. | "Evident Utensil" | 2:51 |
| 7. | "Territory" | 6:04 |
| 8. | "Make Your Mind Up" | 4:24 |
| 9. | "Don't Give a Damn" | 4:21 |
| 10. | "Chameleon Closet" | 1:59 |
| 11. | "Ceiling Wax" | 3:39 |
| Total length: | | 43:50 |

2009 Columbia reissue
| No. | Title | Length |
|---|---|---|
| 8. | "Le Flying Saucer Hat" | 3:17 |
| 9. | "Make Your Mind Up" | 5:18 |
| 10. | "Dixie Gypsy" | 4:03 |
| 11. | "Don't Give a Damn" | 4:21 |
| 12. | "Chameleon Closet" | 1:59 |
| 13. | "Ceiling Wax" | 3:39 |
| Total length: | | 52:04 |
