= Mollie Elizabeth =

American singer (born 2003)

- Elizabeth in 2026

Background information
- Born: October 11, 2003 (age 23)
- Origin: Cascade Range, Washington, US
- Genres: Dream pop; alt pop; indie pop
- Occupation: Singer
- Years active: 2024–present
- Label: Neon Gold

Mollie Elizabeth, known on social media as doeyedfairie, is an American singer. She first gained attention when her song "Vegas Venetian" went viral in January 2025. After signing with Neon Gold Records, she achieved further recognition with her 2026 single "Run Rabbit".

== Life and career ==
Mollie Elizabeth was raised outside Seattle in the Cascade Range of Washington. She has stated she had panic attacks from her youth. She began writing music at a young age, drawing aesthetic and creative inspiration from Audrey Hepburn, Brigitte Bardot, and Marilyn Monroe. She began creating social media content, specifically makeup tutorials, during the COVID-19 pandemic.

In 2024, a raw demo of her song "Vegas Venetians" went viral online. She released the finalized track in early 2025. Later that year, she signed with Neon Gold Records and released her debut EP Dirty Blonde which received a 4.5/5 rating from CrypticRock. Her song "Run Rabbit", released in 2026, went viral on TikTok prior to its full release.

Elizabeth draws heavy inspiration from 1950s and 1960s pop and vocalists, such as Rosemary Clooney and Frank Sinatra. Her visual work is recognized for its hyperfeminine and whimsical aesthetic. Her primary instrument is the ukelele.

== Discography ==
=== EPs ===
- Dirty Blonde (Neon Gold Records, 2025)
- People Pleaser (2026)

=== Singles ===
- "Vegas Venetians" (2025)
- "Dinner for One" (2025)
- "The Disappearing Girl" (2025)
- "Dog Eat Dog" (2026)
- "The Mirror" (2026)
- "Run Rabbit" (2026)
- "Puppet Show" (2026)
- "Petty Crimes" (2026)
- "Kiss the Ring" (2026)
- "Gimme More!" (2026)
- "Bang Bang!" (2026)
