= Danny L Harle discography =

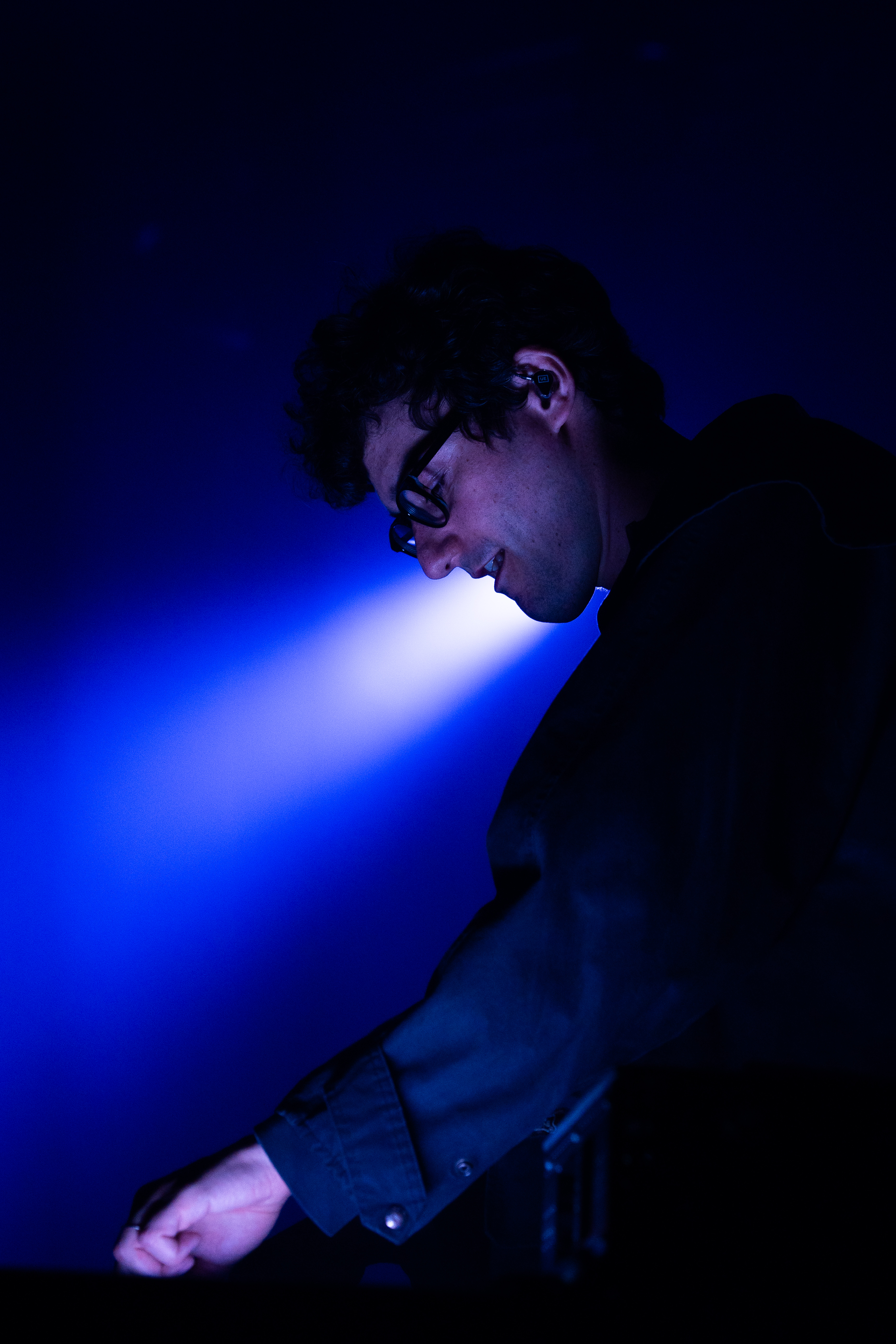
- Harle performing at the 2026 Montreux Jazz Festival
- Studio albums: 2
- EPs: 2
- Singles: 22
- Collaborative albums: 2
- Remix albums: 1
- Remixes: 22

The discography of English producer Danny L Harle consists of two studio albums, one remix album, two collaborative albums, two extended plays, 22 singles, and 22 remixes.

== Albums ==
=== Studio albums ===
Title	Album details
Harlecore	Released: 28 February 2021; Label: Mad Decent; Formats: CD, digital download, LP, streaming
Cerulean	Released: 13 February 2026; Label: XL Recordings; Formats: CD, digital download, LP, streaming

=== Collaborative albums ===
Title	Album details
Disklavier Concert I (with A. G. Cook, Spencer Nobel, and Tim Phillips as Dux Consort)	Released: 19 February 2012; Label: Self-released; Formats: Digital download, streaming
Lifestyle (with A. G. Cook as Dux Content)	Released: 7 March 2013; Label: Gamsonite, PC Music; Formats: Digital download, streaming

=== Remix albums ===
Title	Album details
Harlecore (Remixes)	Released: 18 March 2022; Label: Mad Decent; Formats: LP, digital download, streaming

== Extended plays ==
Title	EP details
Broken Flowers	Released: 20 November 2015; Label: Ultra, Sony UK; Formats: Digital download, streaming
1UL	Released: 19 May 2017; Label: PC Music; Formats: Digital download, streaming
Crystallise Divergence	Released: 24 July 2026; Label: XL; Formats: Digital download, streaming

== Singles ==
Title	Year	Peak chart positions									Album
Title	Year	BOL Ang Air.	GER Air.	GTM Ang Air.	LAT Air.	LTU Air.	NZ Hot	NIC Ang Air.	PAN Ang Air.	VEN Ang Air.	Album
"Broken Flowers"	2013	*	—	*			—	*	*	—	Broken Flowers
"In My Dreams"	2014	*	—	*			—	*	*	—	PC Music Volume 1
"Forever"	2015	*	—	*			—	*	*	—	Broken Flowers
"Always Remember"	2015	*	—	*			—	*	*	—	Non-album singles
"Ashes of Love" (featuring Caroline Polachek)	2016	—	—	—	—	—	—	*	*	—	Non-album singles
"Super Natural" (featuring Carly Rae Jepsen)	2016	—	—	—	—	—	—	*	*	—	PC Music Volume 2
"Me4U" (featuring 모리)	2017	—	—	—	—	—	—	*	—	—	1UL
"1UL"	2017	—	—	—	—	—	—	*	—	—	1UL
"Never Thought" (as Danny Sunshine)	2017	—	—	—	—	—	—	*	—	—	Month of Mayhem
"Bom Bom" (with Tkay Maidza)	2017	—	—	—	—	—	—	—	—	—	Non-album single
"Blue Angel" (featuring Clairo)	2018	—	—	—	—	—	—	—	—	—	PC Music Volume 3
"Part of Me" (with Hannah Diamond)	2019	—	—	—	—	—	—	—	—	—	Non-album singles
"Dreaming" (with Lil Texas)	2020	—	—	—	—	—	—	—	—	—	Non-album singles
"On a Mountain"	2021	—	—	—	—	—	—	—	—	—	Harlecore
"Boing Beat"	2021	—	—	—	—	—	—	—	—	—	Harlecore
"Interlocked"	2021	—	—	—	—	—	—	—	—	—	Harlecore
"Ocean's Theme"	2021	—	—	—	—	—	—	—	—	—	Harlecore
"On a Mountain" (Flume remix)	2021	—	—	—	—	—	—	—	—	—	Harlecore (Remixes)
"Galore" (French version) (with Oklou and Pomme)	2021	—	—	—	—	—	—	—	—	—	Galore Anniversary
"Boing Beat" (VTSS remix)	2021	—	—	—	—	—	—	—	—	—	Harlecore (Remixes)
"Interlocked" (Lil Texas remix) (featuring Pussy Riot)	2022	—	—	—	—	—	—	—	—	—	Harlecore (Remixes)
"Encore" (with Shygirl)	2024	—	—	—	—	—	—	—	—	—	Club Shy RMX
"Starlight" (with PinkPantheress)	2025	—	—	—	—	—	—	—	—	—	Cerulean
"Azimuth" (with Caroline Polachek)	2025	—	—	—	—	—	—	—	—	—	Cerulean
"Crystallise My Tears" (with Oklou & MNEK)	2025	—	—	—	—	—	—	—	—	—	Cerulean
"Raft in the Sea" (featuring Julia Michaels)	2026	—	—	—	—	—	—	—	—	—	Cerulean
"Two Hearts" (with Dua Lipa)	2026	11	89	11	8	99	27	2	11	16	Cerulean
"—" denotes a recording that did not chart or was not released in that territory. "*" denotes that the chart did not exist at that time.

== Remixes ==
Title	Year	Artist
"Sick Beat" (Danny L Harle Remix)	2014	Kero Kero Bonito
"All the Sad Young Men" (Danny L Harle Remix)	2015	Spector
"Come To Your Senses" (Danny L Harle Remix)	2015	Panda Bear
"Shine" (Danny L Harle Remix)	2015	Years & Years
"Can't Sleep Love" (Danny L Harle Remix)	2016	Pentatonix
"At Night (I Think About You)" (Danny L Harle Remix) (featuring Kevin Jz Prodigy)	2016	MNEK
"Nanimono" (Danny L Harle Remix)	2016	Yasutaka Nakata featuring Kenshi Yonezu
"After the Afterparty" (Danny L Harle Remix)	2016	Charli XCX featuring Lil Yachty
"Night Time" (Danny L Harle Remix)	2018	Superorganism
"Beautiful People" (Danny L Harle Harlecore Remix)	2019	Ed Sheeran featuring Khalid
"Love Gang" (Danny L Harle Remix)	2019	Whethan featuring Charli XCX
"24 Hours" (Danny L Harle Remix)	2020	Georgia
"gec 2 Ü" (Danny L Harle Harlecore Remix)	2020	100 gecs
"Silent Witness Theme" (Danny L Harle Remix)	2020	John Harle
"Hopeless" (Danny L Harle Remix)	2021	Katie Dey
"Just A Touch" (Danny L Harle Harlecore Remix)	2021	Perfume Genius
"Wildeye" (Danny L Harle Remix)	2021	Jónsi
"Psycho" (Danny L Harle Remix)	2021	Maisie Peters
"RU Joking" (Danny L Harle Remix)	2021	Raveena Golden
"FVN" (Danny L Harle Remix)	2021	LVL1
"Head on Fire" (Danny L Harle Remix)	2022	Griff and Sigrid
"U Love It" (Danny L Harle Remix)	2022	Sophie Powers
"Chaeri" (Danny L Harle Remix)	2022	Magdalena Bay
"Mantle" (Danny L Harle Remix)	2023	Isamaya Ffrench
"Houdini" (Danny L Harle Slowride Mix)	2024	Dua Lipa
"Harvest Sky" (Danny L Harle C Mix)	2024	Oklou featuring Underscores
"Who Wants to Live Forever" (Danny L Harle Remix)	2026	Nine Inch Nails featuring Judeline

== Songwriting and production credits ==
Year	Title	Artist(s)	Album	Credits	Writer(s)	Producer(s)
2017	"ILY2"	Charli XCX	Number 1 Angel	Co-writer/producer	Charlotte Aitchison, Harle	Harle
2017	"I Feel Alright"	Cosha	Non-album single	Co-writer/co-producer	Cassia O'Reilly, Cedellah Hall, Alexander Crossan, Harle	Mura Masa, Harle
2017	"Worth It (Perfect)"	Superfruit	Future Friends	Co-writer/producer	Mitch Grassi, Jakob Bjørn-Hansen, Harle, Scott Hoying, Caroline Polachek	Harle
2017	"Fantasy" (featuring Amber Liu)	Superfruit	Future Friends	Co-writer/co-producer	Sarah Hudson, Harle, Sophie Xeon, John Hill, Amber Liu	SOPHIE, Harle
2017	"Keep Me Coming"	Superfruit	Future Friends	Co-writer/producer	Mitch Grassi, Scott Hoying, Harle, Caroline Polachek	Harle
2018	"B.O.M.D." (featuring Danny L Harle)	Clairo	Diary 001 EP	Featured artist/co-writer/co-producer	Claire Cottrill, Isaac Burns, Harle	Harle, Clairo
2018	"Honey"	Cosha	R.I.P. Bonzai	Co-writer/co-producer	Cassia O'Reilly, Alexander Crossan, Harle	Cosha, Mura Masa, Harle
2018	"Touch Me"	Eva	Truthfully	Co-producer	Eva Tolkin, Eric Cross	Eric Cross, Harle
2018	"Boogie All Night" (featuring Nao)	Chic	It's About Time	Co-writer/co-producer	Nile Rodgers, Neo Jessica Joshua, Harle	Nile Rodgers, Russel Graham, Nao, Harle
2018	"Do You Wanna Party" (featuring LunchMoney Lewis)	Chic	It's About Time	Co-writer/co-producer	Nile Rodgers, Thomas Troelsen, Harle, Gamal Lewis	Nile Rodgers, Thomas Troelsen, Harle
2018	"X-Ray"	Tommy Cash	¥€$	Co-writer/producer	Tommy Cash, Harle, Caroline Polachek	Harle, A. G. Cook (add.)
2019	"Play"	Betta Lemme	Non-album single	Co-writer/producer	Elizabeth Lemme, Harle, Jesse Saint John	Harle
2019	"Sleeping In"	Miquela	Non-album single	Co-producer	Miquela, Sophie Simmons	Vegyn, Harle
2019	"Pang"	Caroline Polachek	Pang	Co-writer/co-producer	Caroline Polachek, Harle	Caroline Polachek, Harle
2019	"New Normal"	Caroline Polachek	Pang	Co-writer/co-producer	Caroline Polachek, Harle	Caroline Polachek, Harle
2019	"Look At Me Now"	Caroline Polachek	Pang	Co-writer/co-producer	Caroline Polachek, Harle, Dan Nigro	Caroline Polachek, Dan Nigro, Harle
2019	"Insomnia"	Caroline Polachek	Pang	Co-writer/co-producer	Caroline Polachek, Harle	Caroline Polachek, Harle
2019	"Ocean of Tears"	Caroline Polachek	Pang	Co-producer	Caroline Polachek, Nathaniel Campany, Kyle Shearer	Caroline Polachek, Harle, Valley Girl, A. G. Cook (add.)
2019	"Go as a Dream"	Caroline Polachek	Pang	Co-writer/co-producer	Caroline Polachek, Harle, Robin Hannibal	Caroline Polachek, Harle, Dan Carey
2019	"Caroline Shut Up"	Caroline Polachek	Pang	Co-writer/co-producer	Caroline Polachek, Harle	Caroline Polachek, Harle
2019	"Door"	Caroline Polachek	Pang	Co-writer/co-producer	Caroline Polachek, Dan Nigro, James Stack, Harle	Caroline Polachek, Dan Nigro, Jim-E Stack, Harle
2019	"Parachute"	Caroline Polachek	Pang	Co-writer/co-producer	Caroline Polachek, Harle	Caroline Polachek, Harle
2020	"Chosen Family"	Rina Sawayama	Sawayama	Co-writer/producer	Rina Sawayama, Harle, Johnny Lattimer	Harle
2020	"anthems"	Charli XCX	how i'm feeling now	Co-writer/co-producer	Charlotte Aitchison, Dylan Brady, Harle, Charli's fans who co-wrote verse 2	Dylan Brady, Harle, BJ Burton (add.)
2020	"You and Me Again"	Sophie Meiers	You And Me Again EP	Co-writer/producer	Sophie Meiers, Harle	Harle
2020	"Times New Roman"	Scintii	Non-album single	Producer	Scintii	Harle
2020	"Higher"	Wave Racer	Non-album single	Co-writer	Harle, Olivia Devine, Thomas Purcell	Wave Racer
2020	"Mommy"	Betta Lemme	Non-album single	Co-writer/producer	Harle, Elizabeth Lemme	Harle
2020	"4444"	Daine	Non-album single	Co-writer/producer	Daine Wright, Harle	Harle
2020	"Angel Numbers"	Daine	Non-album single	Producer	Daine Wright, Benjamin Reis	Harle
2020	"Breathless"	Caroline Polachek	Standing at the Gate: Remix Collection	Co-producer	Robert John Lange, The Corrs	Caroline Polachek, Harle
2020	"Some Small Hope"	Lauren Auder & Caroline Polachek	Non-album single	Producer	Virginia Astley, Ryuichi Sakamoto	Harle
2021	"Quiet"	Lauren Auder	5 Songs for the Dysphoric EP	Producer	Lauren Auder	Harle
2022	"Britnaeys New Baby [125 BPM]"	Vegyn	Don't Follow Me Because I'm Lost Too!!	Co-producer	Vegyn	Vegyn, Harle
2022	"Electric"	yeule	Glitch Princess	Co-writer/co-producer	Nat Ćmiel, Harle	Nat Ćmiel, Harle
2022	"Eyes"	yeule	Glitch Princess	Co-writer/co-producer	Nat Ćmiel, Harle	Nat Ćmiel, Harle
2022	"Perfect Blue" (featuring Tohji)	yeule	Glitch Princess	Co-producer	Nat Ćmiel, Tohji	Nat Ćmiel, Tohji, Harle
2022	"Too Dead Inside"	yeule	Glitch Princess	Co-writer/co-producer	Nat Ćmiel, Harle	Nat Ćmiel, Harle
2022	"Bites On My Neck"	yeule	Glitch Princess	Co-writer/co-producer	Nat Ćmiel, Harle	Nat Ćmiel, Harle, Mura Masa
2022	"I <3 U"	yeule	Glitch Princess	Co-writer/co-producer	Nat Ćmiel, Harle	Nat Ćmiel, Harle
2022	"The Things They Did for Me Out of Love"	yeule	Glitch Princess	Co-writer/producer	Nat Ćmiel, Harle	Harle
2022	"The Model Gospel"	Alto Arc	Alto Arc EP	Co-writer/co-producer	Harle, George Lesage Clarke, Isamaya Ffrench, Trayer Clancy Tryon	Harle, Trayer Tryon
2022	"Nocebo"	Alto Arc	Alto Arc EP	Co-writer/co-producer	Harle, George Lesage Clarke, Isamaya Ffrench, Trayer Clancy Tryon	Harle, Trayer Tryon
2022	"Bordello"	Alto Arc	Alto Arc EP	Co-writer/co-producer	Harle, George Lesage Clarke, Isamaya Ffrench, Trayer Clancy Tryon	Harle, Trayer Tryon
2022	"Yeva's Lullaby"	Alto Arc	Alto Arc EP	Co-writer/co-producer	Harle, George Lesage Clarke, Isamaya Ffrench, Trayer Clancy Tryon	Harle, Trayer Tryon, Zach Hill (add.)
2022	"The Circle Unbroken"	Alto Arc	Alto Arc EP	Co-writer/co-producer	Harle, George Lesage Clarke, Isamaya Ffrench, Trayer Clancy Tryon	Harle, Trayer Tryon
2022	"Butterfly"	Donna Missal	In the Mirror, In the Night EP	Additional producer	Donna Missal, Sega Bodega	Sega Bodega, Harle (add.), Samuel Organ (add.)
2022	"Highest Building" (featuring Oklou)	Flume	Palaces	Co-writer/co-producer	Harley Streten, Marylou Mayniel, Harle, Casey Manierka	Flume, Harle
2022	"Sirens" (featuring Caroline Polachek)	Flume	Palaces	Co-writer/co-producer	Harley Streten, Caroline Polachek, Harle	Flume, Harle
2022	"I'm Free"	Liam Gallagher	C'MON YOU KNOW	Co-producer	Liam Gallagher, Andrew Wyatt	Andrew Wyatt, Harle
2022	"Heaven"	Shygirl	Nymph	Co-writer	Shygirl, Mura Masa, Kingdom, Harle, Sega Bodega	Shygirl, Mura Masa, Kingdom, Sega Bodega (add.)
2022	"Poison"	Shygirl	Nymph	Co-writer/producer	Shygirl, Harle, Sega Bodega	Harle, Sega Bodega (add.)
2022	"Fallen Angel"	Hyd	CLEARING	Co-writer	Hayden Dunham, Harle, Sophie Xeon, A. G. Cook	SOPHIE, A. G. Cook
2022	"I Hope She Is Sleeping Well"	Isomonstrosity	Isomonstrosity	Featured artist/co-writer/co-producer	Ellen Reid, Johan Lenox, Yuga Cohler, Harle	Ellen Reid, Johan Lenox, Yuga Cohler, Harle
2023	"Welcome To My Island"	Caroline Polachek	Desire, I Want to Turn Into You	Co-producer	Caroline Polachek, Dan Nigro, James Stack	Caroline Polachek, Dan Nigro, Harle, Jim-E Stack, A. G. Cook (add.)
2023	"Pretty in Possible"	Caroline Polachek	Desire, I Want to Turn Into You	Co-writer/co-producer	Caroline Polachek, Harle	Caroline Polachek, Harle
2023	"Bunny Is a Rider"	Caroline Polachek	Desire, I Want to Turn Into You	Co-writer/co-producer	Caroline Polachek, Harle	Caroline Polachek, Harle
2023	"Crude Drawing of an Angel"	Caroline Polachek	Desire, I Want to Turn Into You	Co-writer/co-producer	Caroline Polachek, Harle	Caroline Polachek, Harle
2023	"I Believe"	Caroline Polachek	Desire, I Want to Turn Into You	Co-writer/co-producer	Caroline Polachek, Harle, Ariel Rechtshaid	Caroline Polachek, Harle, Ariel Rechtshaid
2023	"Fly to You" (featuring Grimes and Dido)	Caroline Polachek	Desire, I Want to Turn Into You	Co-writer/co-producer	Caroline Polachek, Harle, Claire Elise Boucher, Dido Armstrong	Caroline Polachek, Harle
2023	"Blood and Butter"	Caroline Polachek	Desire, I Want to Turn Into You	Co-writer/co-producer	Caroline Polachek, Harle	Caroline Polachek, Harle
2023	"Hopedrunk Everasking"	Caroline Polachek	Desire, I Want to Turn Into You	Co-writer/co-producer	Caroline Polachek, Harle	Caroline Polachek, Harle
2023	"Butterfly Net"	Caroline Polachek	Desire, I Want to Turn Into You	Co-writer/co-producer	Caroline Polachek, Harle	Caroline Polachek, Harle
2023	"Smoke"	Caroline Polachek	Desire, I Want to Turn Into You	Co-writer/co-producer	Caroline Polachek, Harle	Caroline Polachek, Harle
2023	"Billions"	Caroline Polachek	Desire, I Want to Turn Into You	Co-writer/co-producer	Caroline Polachek, Harle	Caroline Polachek, Harle
2023	"Way Back" (featuring PinkPantheress and Trippie Redd)	Skrillex	Don't Get Too Close	Co-writer/co-producer	Skrillex, PinkPantheress, Trippie Redd, Rex Kudo, Harle, Sir Dylan	Skrillex, Rex Kudo, Harle, Sir Dylan, PinkPantheress
2023	"Ophelia"	PinkPantheress	Heaven Knows	Co-writer/co-producer	PinkPantheress, Harle	PinkPantheress, Harle
2024	"Dang"	Caroline Polachek	Desire, I Want to Turn Into You: Everasking Edition	Co-writer/additional production	Caroline Polachek, Caila Thompson-Hannant, Harle	Caroline Polachek, Caila Thompson-Hannant, Harle (add.)
2024	"Butterfly Net" (feat. Weyes Blood)	Caroline Polachek	Desire, I Want to Turn Into You: Everasking Edition	Co-writer/co-producer	Caroline Polachek, Harle	Caroline Polachek, Harle
2024	"Coma"	Caroline Polachek	Desire, I Want to Turn Into You: Everasking Edition	Co-producer	Caroline Polachek, Jaime Brooks	Caroline Polachek, Jaime Brooks, Harle
2024	"Gambler's Prayer"	Caroline Polachek	Desire, I Want to Turn Into You: Everasking Edition	Co-writer/co-producer	Caroline Polachek, Harle	Caroline Polachek, Harle
2024	"I Believe" (Acoustic Version)	Caroline Polachek	Desire, I Want to Turn Into You: Everasking Edition	Co-writer	Caroline Polachek, Harle, Ariel Rechtshaid	Caroline Polachek, Ariel Rechtshaid
2024	"End of an Era"	Dua Lipa	Radical Optimism	Co-writer/co-producer	Dua Lipa, Kevin Parker, Harle, Caroline Ailin, Tobias Jesso Jr.	Kevin Parker, Harle, Cameron Gower Poole (vocal), Caroline Ailin (vocal)
2024	"Houdini"	Dua Lipa	Radical Optimism	Co-writer/co-producer	Dua Lipa, Kevin Parker, Harle, Caroline Ailin, Tobias Jesso Jr.	Kevin Parker, Harle, Cameron Gower Poole (vocal), Caroline Ailin (vocal)
2024	"Training Season"	Dua Lipa	Radical Optimism	Co-writer/additional production	Dua Lipa, Kevin Parker, Harle, Caroline Ailin, Tobias Jesso Jr., Nick Gale, Martina Sorbara, Shaun Frank, Yaakov Gruzman, Steve Francis Richard Mastroianna	Kevin Parker, Harle (add.), Cameron Gower Poole (vocal), Caroline Ailin (vocal)
2024	"These Walls"	Dua Lipa	Radical Optimism	Co-writer/co-producer	Dua Lipa, Andrew Wyatt, Harle, Billy Walsh, Caroline Ailin	Andrew Wyatt, Harle, Cameron Gower Poole (vocal)
2024	"Whatcha Doing"	Dua Lipa	Radical Optimism	Co-writer/additional production	Dua Lipa, Kevin Parker, Harle, Caroline Ailin, Ali Tamposi	Kevin Parker, Harle (add.), Cameron Gower Poole (vocal)
2024	"French Exit"	Dua Lipa	Radical Optimism	Co-writer/co-producer	Dua Lipa, Kevin Parker, Harle, Caroline Ailin, Tobias Jesso Jr.	Kevin Parker, Harle, Cameron Gower Poole (vocal)
2024	"Illusion"	Dua Lipa	Radical Optimism	Co-writer/co-producer	Dua Lipa, Kevin Parker, Harle, Caroline Ailin, Tobias Jesso Jr.	Kevin Parker, Harle, Cameron Gower Poole (vocal), Caroline Ailin (vocal)
2024	"Falling Forever"	Dua Lipa	Radical Optimism	Co-writer/additional production	Dua Lipa, Ian Kirkpatrick, Harle, Emily Warren, Ali Tamposi, Tobias Jesso Jr.	Ian Kirkpatrick, Harle (add.), Cameron Gower Poole (vocal)
2024	"Anything for Love"	Dua Lipa	Radical Optimism	Co-writer/additional production	Dua Lipa, Ian Kirkpatrick, Harle, Tobias Jesso Jr., Julia Michaels, Caroline Ailin	Ian Kirkpatrick, Harle (add.), Cameron Gower Poole (vocal)
2024	"Maria"	Dua Lipa	Radical Optimism	Co-writer/co-producer	Dua Lipa, Andrew Wyatt, Harle, Julia Michaels, Caroline Ailin	Andrew Wyatt, Harle, Cameron Gower Poole (vocal)
2024	"Happy for You"	Dua Lipa	Radical Optimism	Co-writer/co-producer	Dua Lipa, Kevin Parker, Harle, Caroline Ailin, Tobias Jesso Jr.	Kevin Parker, Harle, Cameron Gower Poole (vocal)
2025	"endless"	oklou	choke enough	Co-writer/additional production	Marylou Mayniel, Nate Campany, Harle, Casey Manierka-Quaile	oklou, Casey MQ, Harle (add.)
2025	"take me by the hand" (feat. Bladee)	oklou	choke enough	Additional production	Marylou Mayniel, Caila Thompson-Hannant, Casey Manierka-Quaile, Benjamin Reichwald	oklou, Casey MQ, Harle (add.)
2025	"harvest sky" (feat. underscores)	oklou	choke enough	Co-writer/co-producer	Marylou Mayniel, Nate Campany, April Harper Grey, Harle, Casey Manierka-Quaile	oklou, Harle, Casey MQ, Nick Léon (add.), underscores (add.)
2025	"want to wanna come back"	oklou	choke enough	Additional production	Marylou Mayniel, Casey Manierka-Quaile	oklou, Casey MQ, Harle (add.)
2025	"Polari"	Olly Alexander	Polari	Co-writer/producer	Olly Alexander, Harle	Harle
2025	"Cupid's Bow"	Olly Alexander	Polari	Co-writer/co-producer	Olly Alexander, Harle	Harle, Finn Keane
2025	"I Know"	Olly Alexander	Polari	Co-writer/producer	Olly Alexander, Harle	Harle
2025	"Shadow of Love"	Olly Alexander	Polari	Co-writer/producer	Olly Alexander, Harle	Harle
2025	"Make Me a Man"	Olly Alexander	Polari	Co-writer/co-producer	Olly Alexander, Vince Clarke, Harle	Vince Clarke, Harle
2025	"Dizzy"	Olly Alexander	Polari	Co-writer/producer	Olly Alexander, Harle	Harle, Finn Keane (add.)
2025	"Archangel"	Olly Alexander	Polari	Co-writer/producer	Olly Alexander, Harle	Harle
2025	"Miss You So Much"	Olly Alexander	Polari	Co-writer/producer	Olly Alexander, Harle	Harle
2025	"When We Kiss"	Olly Alexander	Polari	Co-writer/co-producer	Olly Alexander, Harle	Harle, Keane
2025	"Whisper in the Waves"	Olly Alexander	Polari	Co-writer/producer	Olly Alexander, Harle	Harle
2025	"Beautiful"	Olly Alexander	Polari	Co-writer/producer	Olly Alexander, Harle	Harle
2025	"Heal You"	Olly Alexander	Polari	Co-writer/co-producer	Olly Alexander, Harle	Harle, Finn Keane
2025	"Language"	Olly Alexander	Polari	Co-writer/producer	Olly Alexander, Harle	Harle
2025	"DEEPER & DEEPER"	Lexie Liu	TEENAGE RAMBLE	Co-writer/ producer	Lexie Liu, Harle	Harle
