= Spiraling Tour =

2023 concert tour by Caroline Polachek

- Tour by Caroline Polachek
- Location: Europe; North America; Asia; Australia
- Associated album: Desire, I Want to Turn Into You
- Start date: 10 February 2023
- End date: 13 December 2023
- No. of shows: 70
- Supporting acts: Alex G; Doss; Ethel Cain; George Clanton; Indigo De Souza; Magdalena Bay; Sudan Archives; Toro y Moi; True Blue

Caroline Polachek concert chronology
- Heart Is Unbreaking Tour (2021); Spiraling Tour (2023)

The Spiraling Tour was the third headlining concert tour by American singer-songwriter and producer Caroline Polachek, in support of her fourth studio album, and second under her name, Desire, I Want to Turn Into You (2023). The tour began on 10 February 2023 in Brighton, England, and concluded on 13 December 2023 in Brisbane, Australia.

== Background ==
On December 12, 2022, Polachek announced the European and American legs of the tour alongside the release of the music video for the single "Welcome to My Island". Support for all UK and European dates came from Doss, while special guests throughout the US tour included Ethel Cain, Sudan Archives, George Clanton, Toro Y Moi, Alex G and Magdalena Bay. On 22 August 2023, Polachek announced the Australian leg of the tour, with True Blue opening for the shows.

== Concert synopsis ==
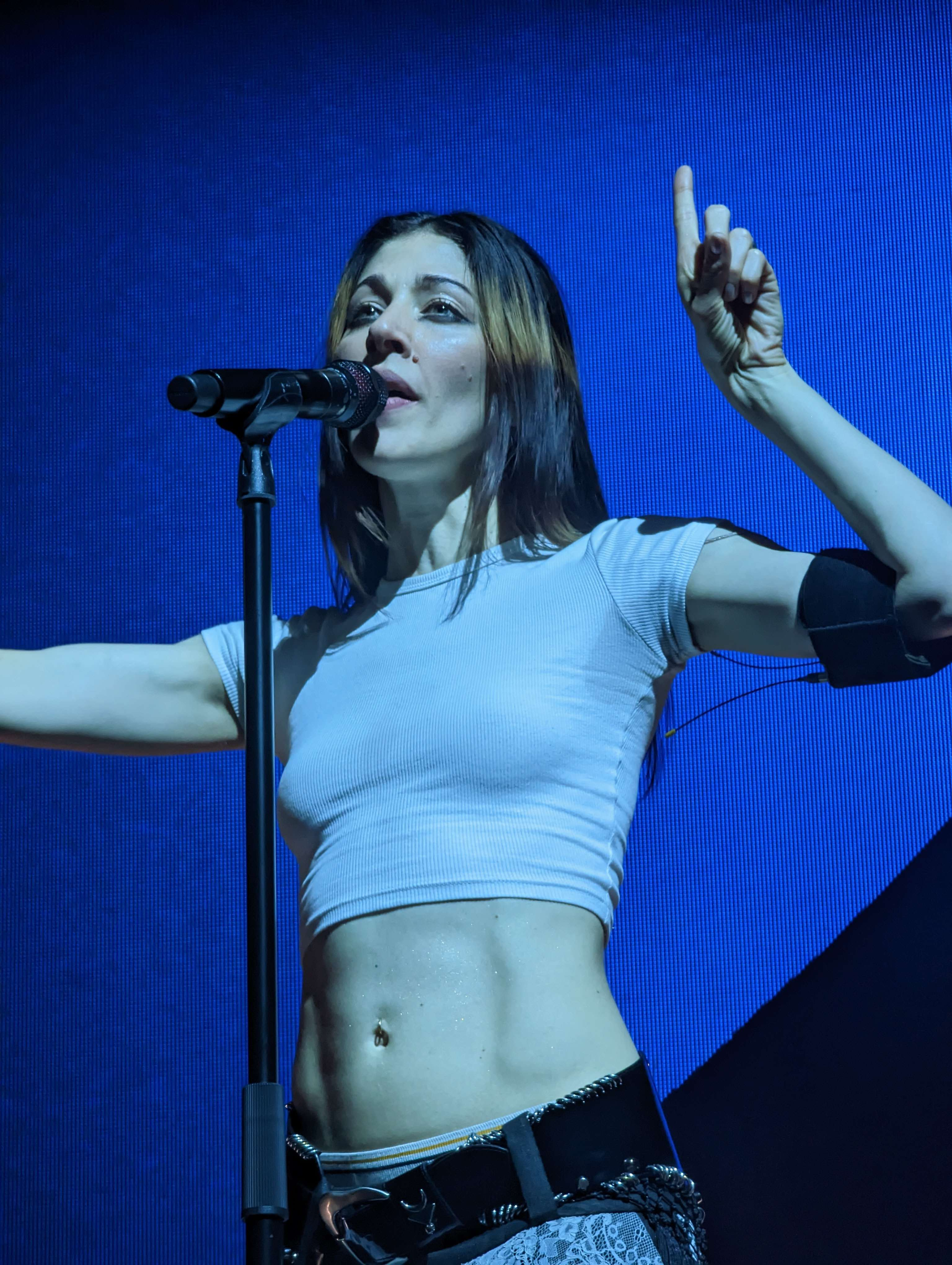
Caroline Polachek performs at the Warfield in San Francisco, California on May 1, 2023.

The shows often began with lights pouring over the stage and a cracked clock appearing on the screen, counting down from a minute. At the end of the minute, "Welcome to My Island" was performed as the opening track. For the headline concert dates, all 12 songs from Desire, I Want to Turn Into You were played, often continuing in a similar order as the album. The final song to play was "So Hot You're Hurting My Feelings", followed by a two-song encore of "Hopedrunk Everasking" and "Door". In a blog post, KOOP 91.7 Radio commented that "while most songs had a clear start and end, these blended together nicely".

The set featured a large volcano as the primary backdrop, with smoking billowing from the top, and other smaller volcano peaks being placed around the stage.

== Set list ==
This set list is from the concert on 24 April 2023, in Houston, Texas, United States. It is not intended to represent all tour dates.

1. "Welcome to My Island"
2. "Hit Me Where It Hurts"
3. "Pretty In Possible"
4. "Bunny Is a Rider"
5. "Sunset"
6. "Crude Drawing of an Angel"
7. "Ocean of Tears"
8. "I Believe"
9. "Fly to You"
10. "Pang"
11. "Blood and Butter"
12. "Parachute"
13. "Butterfly Net"
14. "Billions"
15. "Caroline Shut Up"
16. "Smoke"
17. "So Hot You're Hurting My Feelings"

Encore

18. "Hopedrunk Everasking"
19. "Door"

== Tour dates ==
List of concerts, showing date, city, country, venue, and opening act
| Date | City | Country | Venue | Opening acts |
Europe
| 10 February 2023 | Brighton | England | Chalk | Doss |
| 11 February 2023 | Leeds | England | Leeds Beckett Students' Union | Doss |
| 12 February 2023 | Oxford | England | O2 Academy Oxford | Doss |
| 14 February 2023 | London | England | Eventim Apollo | Doss |
| 18 February 2023 | Paris | France | Salle Pleyel | Doss |
| 20 February 2023 | Copenhagen | Denmark | Store Vega | Doss |
| 22 February 2023 | Berlin | Germany | Huxley's Neue Welt | Doss |
| 23 February 2023 | Hamburg | Germany | Mojo Club | Doss |
| 24 February 2023 | Amsterdam | Netherlands | Paradiso Grote Zaal | Doss |
| 25 February 2023 | Cologne | Germany | Kantine | Doss |
| 27 February 2023 | Borgerhout | Belgium | Trix Zaal | Doss |
North America
| 14 April 2023 | Philadelphia | United States | Franklin Music Hall | George Clanton |
| 15 April 2023 | Boston | United States | Roadrunner | George Clanton |
| 17 April 2023 | Toronto | Canada | Queen Elizabeth Theatre | George Clanton |
| 18 April 2023 | Royal Oak | United States | Royal Oak Music Theatre | George Clanton |
| 19 April 2023 | Columbus | United States | Newport Music Hall | George Clanton |
| 21 April 2023 | Atlanta | United States | The Eastern | George Clanton |
| 22 April 2023 | Athens | United States | Georgia Theatre | George Clanton |
| 24 April 2023 | Houston | United States | White Oak Music Hall | Toro y Moi |
| 25 April 2023 | Austin | United States | The Moody Theater | George Clanton |
| 26 April 2023 | Dallas | United States | The Factory in Deep Ellum | Toro y Moi |
| 28 April 2023 | Tempe | United States | Marquee Theatre | Sudan Archives |
| 29 April 2023 | Los Angeles | United States | Shrine Auditorium | Sudan Archives |
| 1 May 2023 | San Francisco | United States | The Warfield | Magdalena Bay |
| 2 May 2023 | San Francisco | United States | The Warfield | Magdalena Bay |
| 4 May 2023 | Seattle | United States | The Showbox | Sudan Archives |
| 5 May 2023 | Seattle | United States | The Showbox | Sudan Archives |
| 8 May 2023 | Vancouver | Canada | The Orpheum | Sudan Archives |
| 9 May 2023 | Portland | United States | Crystal Ballroom | Sudan Archives |
| 10 May 2023 | Portland | United States | Crystal Ballroom | Sudan Archives |
| 13 May 2023 (Note: The concert on 13 May 2023 at Utah State Fairpark was part of Kilby Block Party 2023.) | Salt Lake City | United States | Utah State Fairpark | —N/a |
| 14 May 2023 | Denver | United States | Mission Ballroom | Alex G Indigo De Souza |
| 16 May 2023 | Chicago | United States | Riviera Theatre | Ethel Cain; True Blue |
| 17 May 2023 | Nashville | United States | Ryman Auditorium | Ethel Cain; True Blue |
| 19 May 2023 | Washington, D.C. | United States | The Anthem | Ethel Cain; True Blue |
| 20 May 2023 | New York City | United States | Radio City Music Hall | Ethel Cain; True Blue |
Europe
| 25 May 2023 | Glasgow | Scotland | SWG3 Galvanizers | True Blue |
| 26 May 2023 | Liverpool | England | CONTENT | —N/a |
| 27 May 2023 (Note: The concert on 27 May 2023 at Brockwell Park was part of Wide Awake Festival 2023.) | London | England | Brockwell Park | —N/a |
| 29 May 2023 (Note: The concert on 29 May 2023 was originally scheduled for 16 February 2023 but was cancelled due to Polachek being "unable to sing properly.") | Bristol | England | The Marble Factory | —N/a |
| 30 May 2023 (Note: The concert on 30 May 2023 was originally scheduled for 15 February 2023 but was cancelled due to Polachek being "unable to sing properly.") | Manchester | England | Albert Hall | —N/a |
| 3 June 2023 (Note: The concert on 3 June 2023 at Parc del Forum was part of Primavera Sound Barcelona 2023.) | Barcelona | Spain | Parc del Fòrum | —N/a |
| 4 June 2023 (Note: The concert on 4 June 2023 at Bois de Vincennes was part of WE LOVE GREEN 2023.) | Paris | France | Bois de Vincennes | —N/a |
| 9 June 2023 (Note: The concert on 9 June 2023 at Beekse Bergenn was part of Best Kept Secret 2023.) | Hilvarenbeek | Netherlands | Beekse Bergen | —N/a |
| 10 June 2023 (Note: The concert on 10 June 2023 at Ciudad del Rock was part of Primavera Sound Madrid 2023.) | Arganda del Rey | Spain | Ciudad del Rock | —N/a |
| 13 June 2023 | Cork | Ireland | Musgrave Park | —N/a |
| 25 June 2023 (Note: The concert on 25 June 2023 at Worthy Farm was part of Glastonbury Festival 2023.) | Pilton | England | Worthy Farm | —N/a |
| 30 June 2023 (Note: The concert on 30 June 2023 at Lotnisko Gdynia-Kosakowo was part of Open'er Festival 2023.) | Gdynia | Poland | Lotnisko Gdynia-Kosakowo | —N/a |
| 1 July 2023 (Note: The concert on 1 July 2023 at Dyrskuepladsen was part of Roskilde Festival 2023.) | Roskilde | Denmark | Dyrskuepladsen | —N/a |
| 3 July 2023 (Note: The concert on 3 June 2023 at Montreux Jazz Lab was part of Montreux Jazz Festival 2023.) | Montreux | Switzerland | Montreux Jazz Lab | —N/a |
| 7 July 2023 (Note: The concert on 7 July 2023 at Letisko was part of Pohoda Festival 2023.) | Trenčín | Slovakia | Letisko | —N/a |
| 14 July 2023 (Note: The concert on 14 July 2023 at Praia de Meco was part of Super Bock Super Rock.) | Sesimbra | Portugal | Praia do Meco | —N/a |
Asia
| 29 July 2023 (Note: The concert on 29 June 2023 at Naeba Ski Resort was part of Fuji Rock Festival 2023.) | Yuzawa | Japan | Naeba Ski Resort | —N/a |
North America
| 5 August 2023 (Note: The concert on 5 August 2023 at Idyllwild Arts Academy was part of FWB Fest 2023.) | Idyllwild | United States | Idyllwild Arts Academy | —N/a |
| 6 August 2023 (Note: The concert on 6 August 2023 at Waterfront Park was part of Bleached Fest 2023.) | San Diego | United States | Waterfront Park | —N/a |
Europe
| 10 August 2023 (Note: The concert on 10 August 2023 at Slottsskogen was part of Way Out West 2023.) | Gothenburg | Sweden | Slottsskogen | —N/a |
| 11 August 2023 (Note: The concert on 11 August 2023 at Toyenparken was part of Oyafestivalen 2023.) | Oslo | Norway | Tøyenparken | —N/a |
| 13 August 2023 (Note: The concert on 13 August 2023 at Suvilahti was part of Flow Festival 2023.) | Helsinki | Finland | Suvilahti | —N/a |
| 14 August 2023 (Note: The concert on 14 August 2023 at Obudai-Sziget was part of Sziget Festival 2023.) | Budapest | Hungary | Óbudai-Sziget | —N/a |
North America
| 18 September 2023 | Los Angeles | United States | Clive Davis Theatre | —N/a |
| 21 October 2023 (Note: The concert on 21 October 2023 at Mana Wynwood Convention Centre was part of iiiPopints 2023.) | Miami | United States | Mana Wynwood Convention Centre | —N/a |
Europe
| 3 November 2023 (Note: The concert on 3 November 2023 at Lingotto Fiere was part of ClubtoClub 2023.) | Turin | Italy | Lingotto Fiere | —N/a |
Asia-Pacific
| 30 November 2023 | Tokyo | Japan | Toyosu PIT | True Blue |
| 2 December 2023 (Note: The concert on 2 December 2023 at Central Harbourfront was part of Clockenflap 2023.) | Hong Kong | China | Central Harbourfront | —N/a |
| 4 December 2023 | Sydney | Australia | Sydney Opera House | —N/a |
| 6 December 2023 | Sydney | Australia | Enmore Theatre | True Blue |
| 8 December 2023 (Note: The concert on 8 December 2023 at Meredith Supernatural Amphitheatre was part of Meredith Music Festival 2023.) | Meredith | Australia | Meredith Supernatural Amphitheatre | —N/a |
| 10 December 2023 | Melbourne | Australia | Forum Theatre | True Blue |
| 11 December 2023 | Melbourne | Australia | Forum Theatre | True Blue |
| 13 December 2023 | Brisbane | Australia | The Tivoli | True Blue |

== Personnel ==
Credits adapted from Front of House Magazine.

- Caroline Polachek – lead vocals
- Maya Lanar (True Blue) – bass, backing vocals
- Matt Horton – guitar
- Russell Holzman – drums, percussion
