= Georgia Twinn =

- Born: Georgia Lee Twinn; 9 March 2003 (age 23)
- Origin: Essex
- Occupation: Musician
- Years active: 2018–present
- Label: Universal
- Member of: Loud LDN
- Website: georgiatwinn.com

Georgia Lee Twinn (born 9 March 2003) is an English musician and social media personality. Born and raised in Essex, she first attracted attention for her 2018 lip-synching video to iLoveFriday's "Mia Khalifa". After releasing "On My Mind" in 2019, she signed to Universal Music Group, and released several works between October 2020 and May 2021 including "I Don't Mind", which was nominated for the Popjustice £20 Music Prize. In 2022, she became a member of Loud LDN.

== Life and career ==
=== Early life, "Mia Khalifa" and "I Don't Mind" ===
Georgia Lee Twinn was born on 9 March 2003 and raised in Essex, and has an older sister. Her parents later separated, causing her to move in with her mother; her father was a fan of rock music. She set up an Instagram account aged eleven, and became a fan of Lana Del Rey around this time after hearing her rendition of "Blue Velvet" on a H&M advert, and found her music helpful in dealing with the struggles she was facing at the time. She later met Del Rey at Latitude Festival, who offered her Doritos. Growing up, Twinn was interested in the police, and thought of becoming a forensic scientist.

In 2018, one of her TikTok videos, "Hit or Miss", in which she lip-synched to a snippet of iLoveFriday's "Mia Khalifa", a song about the retired pornographic actress of the same name that Cheyanne Hays had uploaded to the platform, went viral, receiving over 360,000 likes as of February 2019; the "Hit or Miss" trend was listed at No. 2 on BuzzFeed's "The Biggest TikTok Memes And Trends Of 2018" list in December 2018. She told The Forty Five in April 2021 that the success of the video, when she was fifteen, caused her to suffer from "a lot of sexual harassment online from men", and that the experience caused her to become "more cautious and aware of the types of people that there are online".

The success of her TikTok account prompted her to leave school at sixteen to pursue music. Her first works were cover versions uploaded to YouTube, which prompted a producer to get in touch; her first single, "On My Mind", was self-released, and caught the attention of Universal Music Group. In October 2020, she released a cover of Tame Impala's "Let It Happen", and then the following month she released "You Shouldn't Have Fucked With Me", a contemptuous breakup song. In December 2020, she released "I Don't Mind", which she wrote about her anxiety and released alongside a lyric video. The song appeared at No. 15 on Popjustice's "Top 45 Singles of 2020" listicle at the end of that year, and was nominated in 2021 for the Popjustice £20 Music Prize, an award won by Laura Mvula's "Got Me".

=== "On A Mountain", Talk and "Matty Healy" ===
On 14 January 2021, she featured on Danny L Harle's "On A Mountain", a hardcore song with trance elements released under his DJ Danny alias. The song was released alongside a music video directed by the Rolfes Brothers, which guided viewers around Harle's Euphoria Stadium, the largest room in Club Harlecore, and another song, "Boing Beat", a mákina song released under Harle's alias MC Boing. Upon release, "On A Mountain" became Consequence's "Song of the Week". and both tracks would later appear on Harle's album Harlecore. Flume would later release a future bass remix of the song.

Later that month, Twinn released a solo single, "Raccoons", a song written about a Snapchat group she had been part of that found itself invaded by a group of men who made life difficult for other social media users, and addressed her attempts at dealing with their bullying. A music video was released for the song, which was directed by Courtney McWilliams and Ciaran Linden Beale. The song appeared on her March 2021 EP, Talk; which composed of songs that she had written when she was fifteen, and about her experiences of relationships and school. She told The Forty Five the following month that the EP had been delayed from the start of the COVID-19 pandemic in the United Kingdom; she had used the time to hone her sound, and took inspiration during this period from Grimes, Pale Waves, Lykke Li, and Beabadoobee.

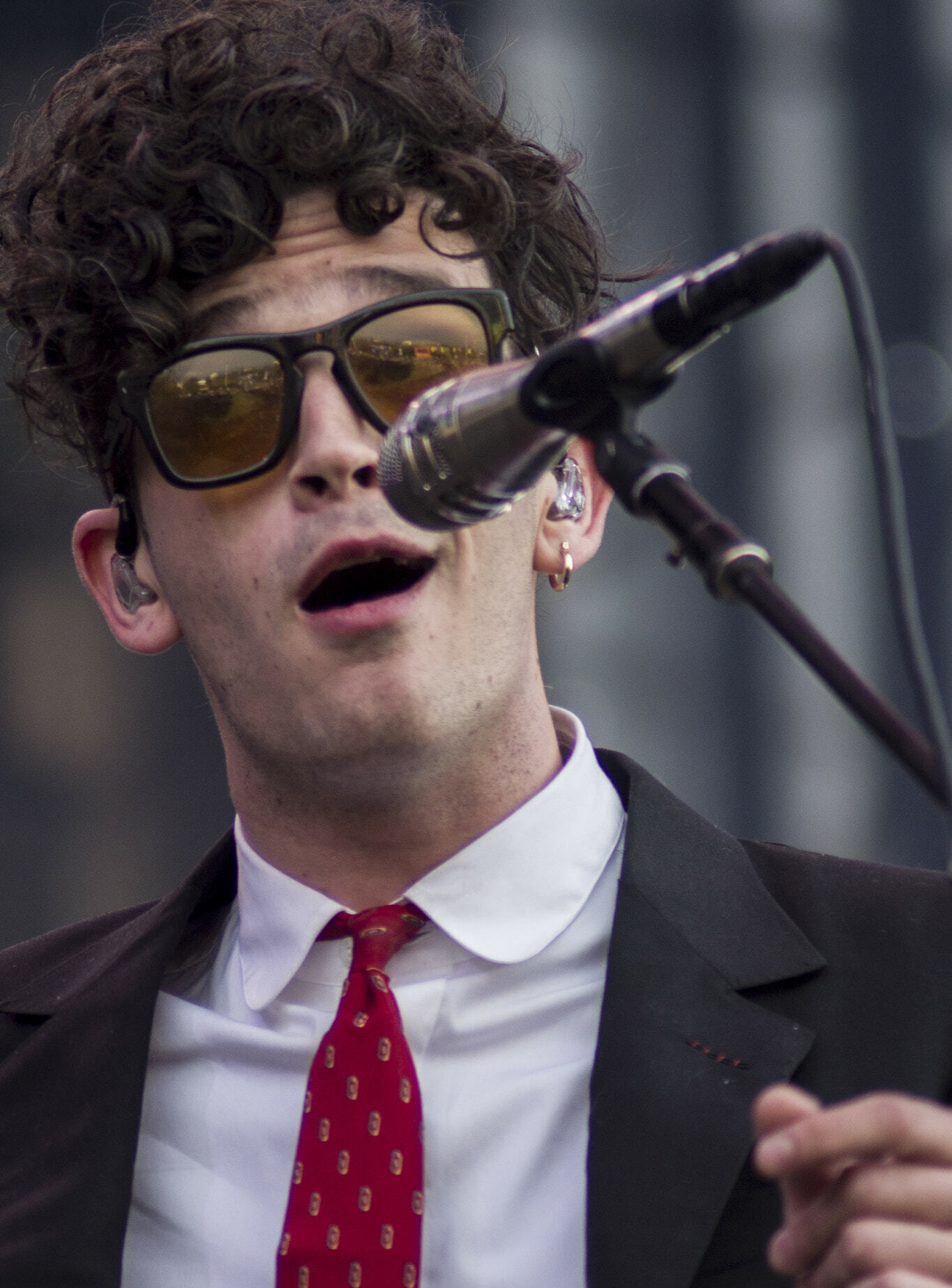
Matty Healy performing in Chile in 2017

In April 2021, she released "Matty Healy", a song named after the frontman of the 1975, who she became a fan of via her older sister, "Girls" first. The song was written when she was fifteen about an arrogant ex-boyfriend who looked like Healy and thought he was better looking than him, and was conceived after Twinn told her regular collaborators about him. The song's bridge references the band's "Somebody Else", and the song's video features a derivative of TikTok, Twinntok, which featured a number of Twinn's old videos. The following month, she released "Moth", a grunge song which contained Nirvana references and was written about a codependent relationship she was in. She became a member of Loud LDN, a collective of London-based women and non-binary artists set up in May 2022, that year.

== Discography ==
=== EPs ===
- Talk (2021)

=== Singles ===
==== As lead artist ====
Twinn has released the following singles:

Singles as lead artist
Title	Year	Album
"On My Mind"	2019	Non-album single
"Let It Happen"	2020	Non-album single
"You Shouldn't Have Fucked With Me"	2020	Non-album single
"I Don't Mind"	2020	Non-album single
"Raccoons"	2021	Talk
"Matty Healy"	2021	Non-album single
"Moth"	2021	Non-album single
"Raised by the Internet"	2022	Non-album single

=== As featured artist ===
Singles as lead artist
Title	Year	Album
"On A Mountain" (with DJ Danny)	2021	Harlecore
