= Welcome to My Island =

2022 single by Caroline Polachek

Single by Caroline Polachek

from the album Desire, I Want to Turn Into You
- Released: December 5, 2022
- Genre: Experimental pop; electronic rock; electropop; guitar pop
- Length: 3:53
- Label: Perpetual Novice
- Songwriters: Caroline Polachek; Daniel Nigro; James Harmon Stack
- Producers: Caroline Polachek; Danny L Harle; Daniel Nigro; Jim-E Stack; A. G. Cook

Caroline Polachek singles chronology
"Sunset" (2022)	"Welcome to My Island" (2022)	"Blood and Butter" (2023)

Music video
- "Welcome to My Island" on YouTube

"Welcome to My Island" is a song by American singer-songwriter and record producer Caroline Polachek. It was released on December 5, 2022, through Perpetual Novice as the fourth single from Polachek's fourth album, Desire, I Want to Turn Into You (2023).

== Background ==
Polachek wrote the song while recording her 2019 album, Pang. She said that the song was "a puzzle" that "went through a million versions to arrive at maximum brat mode". Additionally, she said; "While I was writing this song, I almost saw this from a point of view of egg trapping the sperm… It's maniacal, huge ego. This is the brattiest song I've ever made. I needed to go full brat rant mode. I don't think attitude wise I've ever really gotten to tear into this feeling of conflict and frustration. The record is dealing with catharsis and repression a lot. And I think setting up that tension on track one was part of the mission statement." Polachek also described it as a song for "the headless angels", a loose reference to her 2022 single "Billions". Its cover art is a reference to Isabelle Adjani in Andrzej Żuławski's 1981 film Possession.

== Composition ==
"Welcome to My Island" has been described as an experimental pop, electronic rock, electropop, and guitar pop song with a 1980s styled hook.

== Music video ==
A music video was released on December 12, 2022. Directed by Polachek and her partner, artist Matt Copson, the visual shows her pushing away sperm, running across a construction site, vomiting coffee over a volcano background and more. The video features a cameo from American musician Weyes Blood as a barista.

== Remix ==
A remix version of the song featuring Belgian-British musician George Daniel and British singer Charli XCX was released on January 20, 2023.

"Welcome To My Island (George Daniel & Charli XCX Remix)"

Remix by Caroline Polachek, Charli XCX and George Daniel
- Released: January 20, 2023
- Length: 3:22
- Label: Perpetual Novice
- Songwriters: Caroline Polachek; Daniel Leonard Nigro; Charlotte Aitchison; Jim-E Stack
- Producers: Caroline Polachek; George Daniel; Daniel Nigro; Danny L Harle; Jim-E Stack

Caroline Polachek singles chronology
"Sunset" (2022)	"Welcome To My Island (George Daniel & Charli XCX Remix)" (2023)	"Blood & Butter" (2023)

== Track listing ==
Spotify
No.	Title	Writer(s)	Producer(s)	Length
1.	"Welcome to My Island"	Caroline Polachek; Daniel Nigro; James Harmon Stack	Polachek; Danny L Harle; Nigro; Jim-E Stack; A. G. Cook^{[a]}	3:53
2.	"Sunset"	Polachek; Caroline Ailin; Salvador Navarrete	Polachek; Sega Bodega	2:43
3.	"Billions"	Polachek; Harle	Polachek; Harle	4:57
4.	"Bunny Is a Rider"	Polachek; Harle	Polachek; Harle	3:17

Remix single
No.	Title	Writer(s)	Producer(s)	Length
1.	"Welcome to My Island" (George Daniel and Charli XCX Remix)	Polachek; Charlotte Aitchson; Nigro; Stack	Polachek; Daniel; Nigro; Harle; Jim-E Stack	3:22
2.	"Welcome to My Island" (PVA Remix)	Polachek; Nigro; Stack	Polachek; Nigro; Harle; Jim-E Stack	3:38
3.	"Welcome to My Island"	Polachek; Nigro; Stack	Polachek; Nigro; Harle; Jim-E Stack	3:53

Notes

- ^{^[a]} signifies a co-producer

== Charts ==
Chart performance for "Welcome to My Island"
Chart (2023)	Peak position
US Alternative Airplay (Billboard)	40

== Release history ==
Release history for "Welcome to My Island"
Region	Date	Format	Label	Ref.
Various	December 5, 2022	Digital download; streaming	Perpetual Novice	
United States	January 17, 2023	Alternative radio	Perpetual Novice	
Various	January 20, 2023	Remix single	Perpetual Novice	
