= Butterfly Net (song) =

2024 single by Caroline Polachek

Single by Caroline Polachek featuring Weyes Blood

from the album Desire, I Want to Turn Into You: Everasking Edition
- Released: February 7, 2024
- Genre: Art pop; baroque pop
- Length: 4:36; 5:33 (remix)
- Label: Perpetual Novice
- Songwriters: Caroline Polachek; Danny L Harle
- Producers: Polachek; Harle

Caroline Polachek singles chronology
"Dang" (2023)	"Butterfly Net" (2024)	"Starburned and Unkissed" (2024)

Weyes Blood singles chronology
"Children of the Empire" (2023)	"Butterfly Net" (2024)

"Butterfly Net" is a song by American singer-songwriter Caroline Polachek, included on her fourth studio album Desire, I Want to Turn Into You, released on February 14, 2023. The song was written and produced by Polachek along with Danny L Harle. A remix version featuring American singer Weyes Blood was released on February 7, 2024, as the second single from the reissue of the album, subtitled Everasking Edition.

== Background and release ==
"Butterfly Net" is included on Caroline Polachek's critically-acclaimed fourth studio album Desire, I Want to Turn Into You, a record that was included on many critics' year-end lists, such as from Billboard, The Independent, The Guardian, The New York Times, and DIY Magazine. "Butterfly Net" has a "baroque art-pop" universe.

Polachek first published a part of the remix cover art on her social media accounts on February 6, 2024, with the text "Tomorrow". The following day, the song was surprise-released for digital download and streaming, and in parallel she announced the reissue of the album.

== Critical reception ==
In a review of the standard edition of Desire, I Want to Turn Into You, Rolling Stone critic Maura Johnston described "Butterfly Net" as a "glowing ballad", and praised its "slow-burn instrumentation" and Polachek's "impassioned vocals". For the same magazine, Larisha Paul stated that Weyes Blood's participation on the song is an "exalting appearance".

According to Flood Magazine's reviewer Will Schube, both artists "join forces" in a "power ballad-inspired" chorus. The remix was described by Robin Murray for Clash as a "divine duet" and "truly beautiful piece of music" with an "spiritual quality", "more spartan than the avant-pop maximalism of the original album". In a positive review, Lucy Harbron for Far Out gave the remix 3.5 out of 5 stars, and stated that Mering's "deep, velvety sound perfectly contrasts the high-ranging vocal acrobatics Polachek is known for". Stereogum critic Chris Deville also praised Weyes Blood's participation on the track.
