= Dang (song) =

2023 Caroline Polachek single

Single by Caroline Polachek

from the album Desire, I Want to Turn Into You: Everasking Edition
- Released: October 17, 2023
- Genre: Pop; hyperpop
- Length: 2:44
- Label: Perpetual Novice; Sony Music
- Songwriters: Daniel Harle; Caila Thompson-Hannant; Caroline Polachek
- Producers: Caroline Polachek; Cecile Believe; Danny L Harle

Caroline Polachek singles chronology
"Blood and Butter" (2023)	"Dang" (2023)	"Butterfly Net" (2024)

"Dang" is a song by American singer-songwriter and producer Caroline Polachek, released on October 17, 2023 as the lead single from Desire, I Want to Turn Into You: Everasking Edition. It was written and produced by Polachek with Danny L Harle and Cecile Believe.

== Background and composition ==
"Dang" was written and produced by Polachek in collaboration with Danny L Harle and Cecile Believe. The single was recorded during the studio sessions for Polachek's second album under her own name, Desire, I Want to Turn Into You, released in February 2023. In spring 2023, A. G. Cook dropped it into one of his DJ sets. Polachek officially started teasing the song in September of the same year.

The track samples audio from a viral 2020 video of Polachek screaming at geese in Hyde Park. The single cover also references the video, with Polachek's right arm painted like a mute swan. The hyperpop song features "metallic, lockstep beat that recalls early Sophie, [...] nonsensical imagery, namechecking Mary Poppins and lamenting spilt milk", cascading violins, Polachek's deadpan vocals and screams, and Danny L Harle's baby daughter Nico's giggle sampled from "Bunny Is a Rider".

== Release ==
While a leaked version of "Dang" had been circulating online for months, Polachek officially debuted the track on October 17, 2023 in a live performance on The Late Show with Stephen Colbert. Polachek's performance of the single utilized a slide show presentation and a chalkboard-inspired backdrop. A limited run of T-shirts featuring slides from the performance went on sale on Polachek's website, with 100% of profits donated to UNRWA to help Palestinian refugees.

== Critical reception ==
Peyton Toups of Pitchfork characterized "Dang" as a "transfixing...mishmash of nonsensical imagery and surprise elements" and observed that the single marked a new stylistic direction for Polachek. Similarly noting the "harsher hyperpop" sound of the single, Alex Hudson of Exclaim! listed "Dang" as one of the publication's staff picks.
