= Mia Khalifa (song) =

2018 single by iLoveFriday

Single by iLoveFriday

from the EP Mood
- Released: February 12, 2018 (independent release); December 14, 2018 (re-released)
- Recorded: 2018
- Genre: Hip-hop
- Length: 2:57
- Label: Records; Columbia
- Songwriters: Aqsa Malik; Carrington Hyatt
- Producer: Xeno Carr

iLoveFriday singles chronology
"Travel Ban" (2018)	"Mia Khalifa" (2018)	"Woah Vicky (Diss)" (2018)

Music video
- "Mia Khalifa" on YouTube

"Mia Khalifa" (originally titled "Mia Khalifa (Diss)" also known as "Hit or Miss", and sometimes stylized as "MiA KHALiFA") is a song by American hip-hop group iLoveFriday (stylized as iLOVEFRiDAY). The duo of Atlanta-based rappers Aqsa Malik (also known as Smoke Hijabi) and Carrington Hyatt (also known as Xeno Carr) self-released the song on February 12, 2018, which was later re-released by Records Co and Columbia Records on December 14, 2018. It was included on their second EP, Mood (2019). The song was produced by Carr. The song is a diss track targeting Mia Khalifa, a Lebanese-American Internet celebrity and former pornographic actress. The decision to write a song dissing Khalifa arose over a misunderstanding. A falsified screenshot, intended as a joke, seemed to show Khalifa, who once appeared in a pornographic film wearing a hijab, criticizing Malik for smoking while wearing a hijab in a music video. iLoveFriday thought the screenshot was legitimate.

Critics have praised the song for its unconventional catchiness, but it has also been criticized as off-key and misogynistic. Months after its release, "Mia Khalifa" achieved unexpected viral success on social media, especially among TikTok users. The best-known portion is Malik's verse, which opens with a line that became an Internet meme: "Hit or miss, I guess they never miss, huh?"

== Background and release ==
The music video for iLoveFriday's 2017 song "Hate Me" showed Malik, a Pakistani-American woman, smoking a blunt while wearing a hijab, a type of veil worn by some Muslim women and traditionally used to maintain Islamic standards of modesty.

The song and video were modest successes and gained traction within some online meme-centric communities. By January 2018, an Instagram account posted a screenshot of a fake tweet, attributed to Mia Khalifa, that criticized Malik and the "Hate Me" video. The fake tweet said "She's so disrespectful to all Muslim women and gives us a bad image 🤦‍♀️🧕🏾💣."

Not only was the tweet fake, but Khalifa is actually not Muslim and never has been. She was raised in the Catholic Church in Lebanon but is non-practicing.

Although the screenshot was a joke, Malik said that she believed it was real when she first saw it and was shocked by the statement's apparent hypocrisy, given Khalifa's notoriety for appearing in a pornographic video performing sex acts while wearing a hijab. Malik said in an interview that smoking in a hijab is "not nearly as bad" as what Khalifa had done in a hijab. Many of iLoveFriday's fans also took the screenshot to be authentic and reacted with anger toward Khalifa. There has been some skepticism about whether the group members themselves realized the screenshot was a joke.

Regardless, iLoveFriday recorded "Mia Khalifa" in response to their fans' demand for a diss track. The song was self-released on February 12, 2018. The music video for "Mia Khalifa" was released on March 4, 2018. The video was reportedly viewed about 5 million times in the months before it became a viral meme. The song was later re-released by Records Co and Columbia Records on December 14, 2018. In May 2019, the original video was briefly removed due to a copyright infringement claim from Romanian artist Livia Fălcaru, as multiple pieces of her original art appear in the video without her permission. The video was later reuploaded on May 13, with the original art being pixelated out of the video. On September 27, 2019, "Mia Khalifa" was released as the first track on Mood, iLoveFriday's second EP.

== Music ==
"Mia Khalifa" – the "Hit or Miss" snippet
The viral success of Malik's verse was due, in part, to her unconventionally catchy, distinctively off-kilter delivery. However, the song has also been criticized as merely off-key, annoying, and misogynistic.

The song was produced by Xeno Carr. Malik's verse has been described as the highlight of the song with its distinctive, catchy delivery. According to college newspaper Minnesota Daily, "the song itself rose to notoriety not because of its associations with Mia Khalifa, but rather due to a bizarrely catchy rap bridge." The opening lines of her verse "Hit or miss, I guess they never miss, huh? / You got a boyfriend, I bet he doesn't kiss ya / He gon find another girl and he won't miss ya / He gon skrrt and hit the dab like Wiz Khalifa" have been particularly used in memes.

The song itself is sometimes known as "Hit or Miss" because of the lines. At Pitchfork, Duncan Cooper said the verse captured Malik "at her absolute brattiest". Cooper emphasized her delivery of the phrase "kiss yaaaa!", noting the quality of an "almost Midwestern whine" in her voice despite her Atlanta origins, and wrote that "her melodies are straight and piercing, catchy to an obnoxious degree."

The song also uses sound effects from the arcade game Street Fighter II, including the Capcom logo jingle, the "Fight!" and "Perfect!" announcer clips, as well as "You win!" at the end.

== Reception ==
A panel of reviewers at Vice roundly condemned the song, calling it "upsettingly misogynistic in a really specific and sick way" and "really off-key and shitty-sounding". According to Vice's panel, iLoveFriday should issue "a formal apology" to Khalifa. An article in the college newspaper KentWired expressed similar feelings, further accusing the song of "pettiness" and criticizing the bland production and Malik's "grating voice".

American rapper Bhad Bhabie criticized the song as inappropriate for children who were likely to be exposed to it through social media. When asked whether she thought the Internet has a negative effect on children's psychological maturity, Bhad Bhabie replied:

"Yes. It's not even their fault. Sometimes I'm around kids scrolling through TikTok or whatever and that iLoveFriday 'Mia Khalifa' song will pop up and I'll be like, 'Stop listening to that! No!' This girl listening is like seven, she doesn't understand what this song means."

In an interview with Anthony Padilla, Khalifa stated that she was hurt by the song and that, as a result, she became terrified of going on TikTok and being shamed. According to Reed Kavner at the site Tubefilter, "it's worth reiterating that [Khalifa] was an innocent bystander in all of this. She was the subject of a diss track after doing absolutely nothing. Today, she has 2.3 million Twitter followers and a YouTube channel with her boyfriend celebrity chef Robert Sandberg. None of this will affect her at all".

== Viral success ==
=== "Mia Khalifa" and TikTok memes ===
We literally put TikTok on the map, for free. So many people made TikTok accounts because of the song—I mean, I made one.

— Aqsa Malik, speaking to Pitchfork

"Mia Khalifa" became ubiquitous on TikTok in late 2018 and early 2019. The song became so popular, and was so closely identified with the app itself, that it spawned a call and response meme called the "#hitormiss challenge" or "#TikTokTest". To participate in the challenge, TikTok users would wander into public areas like big-box stores or schools and holler the phrase "hit or miss", hoping to elicit a response from a stranger who might complete the line by calling out "I guess they never miss, huh?" The premise of the meme was that the phrase had become so well known among TikTok users that it could serve as a sort of secret handshake or dogwhistle to find other users in the real world.

The song demonstrated how social media, and TikTok in particular, function as important platforms for listeners to discover new music. In this capacity, it has been identified as a predecessor to Lil Nas X's "Old Town Road", another song by a previously unknown and unsigned artist that found viral success through TikTok. While other songs reached comparable levels of popularity on the app around the same time—including, for example, Ariana Grande's "Thank U, Next"—"Mia Khalifa" was different because its success was completely spontaneous. Grande was already a mainstream artist with major promotion and an established following, while iLoveFriday had minimal promotion and their song's unconventional style did not seem, on its face, calibrated to have broad appeal.

The 15-second "hit or miss" snippet from "Mia Khalifa" was first uploaded to TikTok by a high-school age girl from South Dakota named Cheyanne Hays. Then, a British TikTok user named Georgia Twinn made a highly popular video using the same clip, drawing greater attention to the song. In October 2018, an American cosplayer named Kat (known online as 'NyanNyanCosplay') lip-synced the song while dressed as the character Nico Yazawa from the Japanese multimedia franchise Love Live! Kat's video became a viral meme, and was likely the catalyst that inspired the viral phenomenon around the song. The video spread to YouTube, where PewDiePie—already the most popular individual YouTuber—reused her clip several times in his own videos. English cosplayer Belle Delphine, who has been noted for popularizing the e-girl aesthetic online, also uploaded a notable video of her lip-syncing and dancing along to the song. The Daily Dot wrote that "Delphine's brilliant pink hair and coy personality quickly made the video a hit."

In early July of 2026, the verse "Don't you wish you changed your past? 'Cause it's so bad" began to be used on the social media platform TikTok. It's typically used when a user uploads a video, with the intention of exposing a, typically, influencer or celebrity's past, usually in a negative way. The first photo or clip with text reading, "Don't you wish you changed your past?", then a photo, or video, appears of the person with text reading, "'Cause it's so bad", accompanied with the selected person participating in an activity criticized by the public.

=== Popularity based on metrics ===
Near the end of October 2018, there were more than 1.3 million different videos on TikTok using the same sample; by December, there were more than 2.5 million. By February 2019, at least 4 million different "Mia Khalifa" videos had been uploaded to TikTok, the original music video had been viewed more than 50 million times, and snippets from the song had been played in videos across YouTube approximately 200 million times. The song also reached the number one position on Spotify's Global Viral 50 chart, a ranking of the most-streamed independent songs on the platform, and it consistently charted near the top position for several months.

As of June 2020, TikTok videos which include "Mia Khalifa" have been viewed over 865 million times in total. Videos tagged with the #hitormisschallenge hashtag had collectively accumulated 93.7 million views as of April 2019. By May, videos tagged with #hitormiss had reached a total of 250 million views. Newspaper columnist Calum Marsh noted the existence of an hour-long compilation of dances to "Mia Khalifa" from TikTok. The song's lyrics were the 18th most-read on the site Genius in the first half of 2019, ranking ahead of "I Don't Care" by Ed Sheeran and Justin Bieber, and "Wish You Were Gay" by Billie Eilish.

=== Compensation ===
According to an estimate made by a Pitchfork writer, iLoveFriday probably netted $150,000 worth of royalty payments from YouTube views. The group's manager, Terrance Rowe, did not confirm that figure but laughed, suggesting that the estimate was close or perhaps too low.

Despite their song's breakthrough success on TikTok, iLoveFriday had not initially licensed it for use on the app and never received compensation from the company for the song. However, by early 2019 they had worked out a deal with TikTok granting free use of the song in exchange for promotion of their future music. Rowe justified the group's decision by emphasizing that the opportunity for exposure would be more valuable in the long run than demanding compensation for past views.

TikTok has been criticized for its royalties-payment structure. Citing iLoveFriday's situation, Cody Atkinson of Australian BMA Magazine said TikTok's payment seemed to be worse than streaming services or even busking. Brett Gurewitz of the Los Angeles-based punk rock band Bad Religion criticized the company and said the situation was like "what we saw with Chuck Berry getting a Cadillac instead of royalties."

== Charts ==
Chart performance for "Mia Khalifa"
Chart (2019)	Peak position
UK Video Streaming Chart (Official Charts)	82

== See also ==
- List of viral music videos
- Islam and hip-hop in the United States
- Misogyny in rap music
- Slut-shaming
