= Desire, I Want to Turn Into You =

2023 album by Caroline Polachek

Studio album by Caroline Polachek
- Released: February 14, 2023
- Genres: Art pop; alternative pop; new-age
- Length: 45:25
- Label: Perpetual Novice
- Producers: Caroline Polachek; Danny L Harle; Dan Nigro; Jim-E Stack; Sega Bodega; Ariel Rechtshaid

Caroline Polachek chronology
Standing at the Gate: Remix Collection (2021)	Desire, I Want to Turn Into You (2023)

Singles from Desire, I Want to Turn Into You
- 1. "Bunny Is a Rider" Released: July 14, 2021; 2. "Billions" Released: February 9, 2022; 3. "Sunset" Released: October 17, 2022; 4. "Welcome to My Island" Released: December 5, 2022; 5. "Blood and Butter" Released: January 31, 2023; 6. "Smoke" Released: April 6, 2023

Everasking Edition cover

Singles from Desire, I Want to Turn Into You: Everasking Edition
- 1. "Dang" Released: October 17, 2023; 2. "Butterfly Net" Released: February 7, 2024; 3. "Long Road Home" Released: February 22, 2024

Desire, I Want to Turn Into You is the fourth studio album by American singer-songwriter and producer Caroline Polachek. It was released on February 14, 2023, by Polachek's imprint Perpetual Novice. Polachek produced most of the album alongside Danny L Harle.

The album received widespread acclaim from critics, with several calling it Polachek's best work and acclaiming its experimentation. It charted in Belgium, New Zealand, Spain, Switzerland, the UK, and the US. It received a nomination for Best Engineered Album, Non-Classical at the 66th Grammy Awards.

It was supported by the singles "Bunny Is a Rider", "Billions", "Sunset", "Welcome to My Island", "Blood and Butter" and "Smoke".

A reissue of the album, subtitled Everasking Edition, was released on February 14, 2024, the standard edition's first anniversary. It was supported by the singles "Dang" and a new version of "Butterfly Net" featuring Weyes Blood.

== Background ==
After releasing Pang in late 2019, Polachek was set to tour the record, but was cut short by the COVID-19 pandemic in March 2020. Polachek stayed in London and began work on Desire, I Want to Turn Into You with close collaborator Danny L Harle. She considers the album to be a major partnership with Harle, as the record has "few other collaborators in the mix". She continued work on the album in London until mid-2021, where she briefly relocated to Barcelona alongside Harle and new collaborator Sega Bodega.

In November 2021, Polachek was featured on Charli XCX's "New Shapes" alongside Christine and the Queens. She then embarked on a North American tour with French musician Oklou for the remainder of 2021.

Dua Lipa announced Polachek as a supporting act on the North American and Canadian legs of the Future Nostalgia Tour from February to July 2022, performing at many festivals as well. Polachek was featured on Flume's "Sirens" in March, and wrote and produced the track "Afar" for Hyd in July. She rescheduled European tour dates to finish work on Desire, I Want to Turn Into You.

Six weeks ahead of the album release, in an interview with The Guardian, Polachek confirmed three more song titles: "Blood and Butter", "Pretty in Possible", and "Smoke".

== Composition ==
Desire, I Want to Turn Into You has been described as an art pop, alternative pop, and new-age record, with elements of drum and bass, electronic, rock, and trip-hop. Shaad D'Souza of The Guardian wrote: "Ratcheting up both the fantastical elements of its predecessor as well as its humour and pop instinct, Desire is an eclectic, elaborate and cheekily deranged sequel, and one of the year's most anticipated releases". The album features bagpipes, children's choirs, Spanish guitar, "beats that run the gamut" from Ray of Light-style trip-hop to dembow, Celtic folk, and early '00s-style radio pop. Polachek herself described it as "a very maximalist album".

== Release ==
Desire, I Want to Turn Into You was announced in December 5^{th} 2022, with the title coming from the chorus of Welcome to My Island, released the same day. Polachek has provided three alternative interpretations for the "hyper-expressionistic" title: it could be referring to becoming "desire itself", transforming into the subject of one's desire, or alternatively to turning one's body "into your open arms" and being held.

At the 66th Annual Grammy Awards on February 4, 2024, Polachek hinted that she would be releasing something on Valentine's Day, which is Desire's first anniversary. Three days later, the reissue of the album, subtitled Everasking Edition, was announced.

=== Singles ===
Polachek released the lead single "Bunny Is a Rider" in July 2021, which was written before she went into lockdown. She released the trip hop inspired "Billions" as a single in February. Polachek stated the song took 19 months to finish. The single featured a rework of "Long Road Home", her collaboration with Oneohtrix Point Never from his 2020 album Magic Oneohtrix Point Never, as the B-side. "Sunset" was released as a single in October. Polachek has cited Ennio Morricone's Spaghetti Western film scores as an influence on the song. "Welcome to My Island", which Polachek calls her "brattiest song to date", was released alongside the album announcement. On January 20, a remix by Charli XCX and the 1975's George Daniel was released. "Blood and Butter" was released on January 31, 2023. "Smoke" was released as a single on April 6, 2023, during her Spiraling Tour. It was accompanied by a music video that premiered on the same day.

Polachek released "Dang" on October 17, 2023, as the lead single from Desire, I Want to Turn Into You: Everasking Edition. She performed the song the same evening on The Late Show with Stephen Colbert. After Polachek and Weyes Blood performed "Butterfly Net" live together several times throughout 2023, including at the Glastonbury and Fuji Rock Festivals, they released their joint version of the song on February 7, 2024, alongside the Everasking Edition announcement.

== Critical reception ==
Professional ratings
Aggregate scores
Source	Rating
AnyDecentMusic?	8.5/10
Metacritic	94/100
Review scores
Source	Rating
AllMusic	4.5/5 stars
Clash	9/10
DIY	5/5 stars
Exclaim!	9/10
The Line of Best Fit	9/10
NME	3/5 stars
Paste	9.2/10
Pitchfork	8.7/10
PopMatters	10/10
Rolling Stone	4/5 stars

Upon release, Desire, I Want to Turn Into You received widespread acclaim from music critics. At Metacritic, which assigns a normalized rating out of 100 to reviews from mainstream critics, the album received an average score of 94, based on 19 critical reviews, indicating "universal acclaim". Aggregator AnyDecentMusic? gave the album an 8.5 out of 10, based on their assessment of the critical consensus.

Reviewing the album for AllMusic, Matt Collar opined that the album "finds Polachek unapologetically embracing her inner pop diva, purposefully referencing a '90s and early-2000s pop aesthetic. This is an album of balmy trip-hop grooves, where electric bass riffs, finger-snap beats, and sky-blue synths caress her angelically swooping vocals like dolphins chasing a boat. It's an immediately evocative vibe that she commits to, deftly walking a fine line between earnest romanticism and artful irony." He concluded that with the album, "Polachek breaks free from outside expectations and transforms her inner anxieties into an intoxicating pop euphoria."

Cat Zhang of Pitchfork wrote that the album was the best of Polachek's career, giving it the distinction of Best New Music. Maura Johnston reviewed the album positively for Rolling Stone, calling Polachek an "undeniable talent as a vocalist and arranger" and the album an "example of what happens when pop sets out to transcend its own limits."

In a mixed review for NME, Ella Kemp praised Polachek's experimentation but said that some tracks "suffer[ed] from a more abstract vision" and called the album an "uneven collection". Gabbie Nirenburg also provided a middling review for No Ripcord, calling the album "just fine". She questioned if there was "anything on this record that is really SO unique or special or different from every other competent art pop album out there?"

Year-end lists
Publication	Accolade	Rank	Ref.
AllMusic	Best Albums of 2023	—N/a	
The Atlantic	The 10 Best Albums of 2023	3	
Beats Per Minute	Top 50 Albums of 2023	3	
Billboard	The 50 Best Albums of 2023	26	
The Boston Globe	Our 50 Favorite Albums of 2023	—N/a	
British GQ	Best Albums of 2023	—N/a	
BrooklynVegan	Top 55 Albums of 2023	6	
Consequence	The 50 Best Albums of 2023	5	
Crack	The Top 50 Albums of the Year	5	
DIY	Albums of the Year 2023	1	
Exclaim!	50 Best Albums of 2023	1	
The Fader	The 50 Best Albums of 2023	17	
God Is In The TV	Albums of the Year for 2023	2	
Gorilla vs. Bear	Albums of 2023	43	
The Guardian	The 50 best albums of 2023	3	
The Independent	The 30 Best Albums of 2023	7	
The Line of Best Fit	The Best Albums of 2023	38	
Magnet	Top 25 Albums Of 2023	5	
The New York Times	Best Albums of 2023	2	
NME	The 50 best albums of 2023	6	
Paste	50 Best Albums of 2023	4	
Pitchfork	50 Best Albums of 2023	2	
PopMatters	The 80 Best Albums of 2023	4	
Resident Advisor	The Best Albums of 2023	—N/a	
The Ringer	The 27 Best Albums of 2023	5	
Rolling Stone	100 Best Albums of 2023	28	
The Skinny	The Skinny's Albums of 2023	2	
Slant Magazine	The 50 Best Albums of 2023	5	
Stereogum	The 50 Best Albums Of 2023	11	
Time Out	30 Best Albums of 2023	7	
Under the Radar	Top 100 Albums of 2023	3	
Uproxx	The Best Albums Of 2023	—N/a	
Vogue	The Best Albums of 2023	—N/a	

== Tour ==
Polachek embarked on the Spiraling Tour to promote Desire, I Want to Turn Into You. The tour included North America, Europe, Asia and Australia, beginning on 10 February in Brighton, England and ending on 13 December 2023 in Brisbane, Australia.

== Track listing ==
Desire, I Want to Turn Into You – Standard edition
No.	Title	Writer(s)	Producer(s)	Length
1.	"Welcome to My Island"	Polachek; Daniel Nigro; James Harmon Stack	Polachek; Harle; Nigro; Jim-E Stack; A. G. Cook^{[a]}	3:53
2.	"Pretty in Possible"	Polachek; Harle	Polachek; Harle	3:36
3.	"Bunny Is a Rider"	Harle; Polachek	Polachek; Harle	3:17
4.	"Sunset"	Polachek; Caroline Ailin; Salvador Navarrete	Polachek; Sega Bodega	2:43
5.	"Crude Drawing of an Angel"	Polachek; Harle	Polachek; Harle	3:28
6.	"I Believe"	Ariel Rechtshaid; Polachek; Harle	Polachek; Harle; Rechtshaid	4:07
7.	"Fly to You" (featuring Grimes and Dido)	Polachek; Harle; Claire Elise Boucher; Dido Armstrong		4:05
8.	"Blood and Butter"	Harle; Polachek	Polachek; Harle	4:28
9.	"Hopedrunk Everasking"	Polachek; Harle	Polachek; Harle	3:19
10.	"Butterfly Net"	Polachek; Harle	Polachek; Harle	4:36
11.	"Smoke"	Polachek; Harle	Polachek; Harle	2:57
12.	"Billions"	Harle; Polachek	Polachek; Harle	4:56
Total length:				45:24

Desire, I Want to Turn Into You: Everasking Edition
No.	Title	Writer(s)	Producer(s)	Length
13.	"Dang"	Harle; Caila Thompson-Hannant; Polachek	Polachek; Thompson-Hannant; Harle	2:44
14.	"Spring Is Coming With a Strawberry in the Mouth"	Elena Lopez; Roger Doyle	Polachek; Cook	3:53
15.	"Butterfly Net" (featuring Weyes Blood)	Polachek; Harle	Polachek; Harle	5:33
16.	"Meanwhile"	Polachek; Samuel Organ	Polachek; Organ	1:28
17.	"Coma"	Polachek; Jaime Brooks	Polachek; Brooks; Harle	5:44
18.	"Gambler's Prayer"	Polachek; Harle	Polachek; Harle	3:47
19.	"Long Road Home" (featuring Oneohtrix Point Never)	Polachek; Daniel Lopatin	Polachek; Lopatin	3:44
20.	"I Believe" (Acoustic Version)	Rechtshaid; Polachek; Harle	Polachek; Rechtshaid	4:35
Total length:				76:44

Notes

- ^{^[a]} signifies a co-producer
- "Spring Is Coming With a Strawberry in the Mouth" is a cover of the 1986 song of the same name, as performed by Operating Theatre.
- "Coma" is a cover of "Pharmacoma (For Ben Deitz)" (2019), as performed by Default Genders.
- "Long Road Home" is a rework of the 2020 song of the same name, as performed by Oneohtrix Point Never featuring uncredited vocals from Polachek. It was not initially included on the album, but was added to the Everasking Edition eight days after release. The reworked track was first released as the B-side to "Billions" in 2022.

== Personnel ==
Musicians

- Caroline Polachek – lead vocals
- Danny L Harle – bass (tracks 1, 3, 5, 9)
- Dan Nigro – guitar (tracks 1, 5)
- Nico Harle – additional vocals (track 3)
- Marco Lopez – guitar (track 4)
- Sega Bodega – guitar (track 4)
- Samuel Organ – guitar (tracks 4, 10)
- Miquel Mestres – guitar (track 7)
- Brìghde Chaimbeul – bagpipes (track 8)
- Kirin J Callinan – guitar (track 8)
- Todd Oliver – guitar (track 10)
- The Trinity Choir – additional vocals (tracks 10, 12)
- Matthew Horton – guitar (track 11)
- Antoine Bourachot – drums (track 19,16, 18, 17 )
- Russell Holzman – drums (track 17)
- Isaac Carpenter – drums (track 20)

Technical

- Chris Gehringer – mastering
- Geoff Swan – mixing
- Macks Faulkron – engineering (track 8)

Artwork

- Aidan Zamiri – all photography
- Yuma Burgess – subway map
- David Uzquiza – packaging art direction, monogram design
- Isha Dipika Walia – package design

== Charts ==
Chart performance for Desire, I Want to Turn Into You
Chart (2023)	Peak position
Australian Albums (ARIA)	53
Belgian Albums (Ultratop Flanders)	48
Belgian Albums (Ultratop Wallonia)	55
Dutch Albums (Album Top 100)	35
French Albums (SNEP)	197
German Albums (Offizielle Top 100)	44
New Zealand Albums (RMNZ)	31
Scottish Albums (Official Charts)	8
Spanish Albums (Promusicae)	67
Swiss Albums (Schweizer Hitparade)	25
UK Albums (Official Charts)	23
UK Independent Albums (Official Charts)	2
US Billboard 200	87
US Heatseekers Albums (Billboard)	13
US Independent Albums (Billboard)	19
