= Harlecore =

Studio album by Danny L Harle
- Released: 26 February 2021
- Genre: EDM; rave; hard dance; Eurodance
- Length: 37:32
- Label: Mad Decent
- Producer: Danny L Harle; Hudson Mohawke

Danny L Harle chronology
| 1UL EP (2017) | Harlecore (2021) | Harlecore (Remixes) (2022) |

Singles from Harlecore
- 1. "On a Mountain" Released: 14 January 2021; 2. "Boing Beat" Released: 14 January 2021; 3. "Interlocked" Released: 10 February 2021; 4. "Ocean's Theme" Released: 10 February 2021

Harlecore is the debut studio album by British electronic musician Danny L Harle. It was released 26 February 2021 via Mad Decent. The album draws heavily on rave music, and features Harle taking on the personas of four different DJs, including: DJ Danny, MC Boing (a revived collaboration with PC Music producer Lil Data), DJ Mayhem (a collaboration with Scottish producer Hudson Mohawke) and DJ Ocean (a collaboration with American musician Caroline Polachek).

Harlecore was supported by the singles "On a Mountain" and "Boing Beat", released 14 January 2021, and "Interlocked" and "Ocean's Theme", released 10 February 2021. Accompanying the album, a companion website of the same name acted as an interactive "24/7, virtual club experience".

== Background and release ==
Harle had hosted many live shows, DJ sets and concerts featuring the "Harlecore" title, dating as far back as September 2017. Harle has also adopted the "Harlecore" title in recent remixes. Also familiar is the MC Boing moniker: a collaboration with former labelmate Lil Data (a.k.a. Jack Armitage), which made its premiere in May 2017 as a part of PC Music's Month of Mayhem project.

In late 2019, in a since deleted Tweet responding to a fan asking for new solo material, Harle stated he'd been "working on a lot of stuff" that would "be worth the wait".

On 8 January 2021, social media accounts for @ClubHarlecore begun posting short videos, teasing the release of something soon. This was followed by the release of the singles "On a Mountain", (its music video released the same day), and "Boing Beat" on 14 January, A live performance of "Boing Beat" would be held on the virtual club site on 25 January, followed by a lyric video, released on 27 January.

Teasers of DJ Mayhem were posted to social media the day before the release of "Interlocked", (its music video was also released the same day), and "Ocean's Theme" on 10 February. A music video for "Ocean's Theme" was released later, on 19 February.

== Reception ==
Professional ratings
Aggregate scores
| Source | Rating |
|---|---|
| Metacritic | 78/100 |
Review scores
| Source | Rating |
| AllMusic | 4/5 stars |
| DIY | 3.5/5 stars |
| Exclaim! | 8/10 |
| The Observer | 3/5 stars |
| Pitchfork | 7.3/10 |

In a positive review, Heather Phares of AllMusic wrote that "Harlecore gives the blissful escapism of late-'90s and early-2000s rave culture a 2020s update while staying lovingly true to its roots," calling it "a briskly entertaining look back -- and forward -- at some of EDM's fizziest, gaudiest sounds." For The Observer, critic Michael Cragg called it "big, dumb escapist fun with – as no one says any more – a massive donk on it." Luke Pearson of Exclaim! described it as "full to bursting with '90s rave goodness — it's big, fun, and just a little bit dumb, all delivered with a massive meta wink from Harle himself." For Resident Advisor, Andrew Ryce asserted that "Harlecore transcends any coherent analysis. It's making fun of dance music and celebrating it at the same time," and described it as blending old hard dance styles, hyperpop, and Eurodance.

Ryan Middleton from Magnetic Magazine compared "Ti Amo" and "Do You Remember" to early 2000's music and Basshunter.

== Track listing ==
Credits adapted from Spotify.

| No. | Title | Writer(s) | Length |
|---|---|---|---|
| 1. | "Where Are You Now" (DJ Danny) | Danny L Harle; Neo Jessica Joshua | 3:41 |
| 2. | "Boing Beat" (MC Boing) | Harle; Jack Armitage; Hannah Amond | 1:32 |
| 3. | "Interlocked" (DJ Mayhem) | Harle; Ross Birchard; Lauren Eve Mayberry; Martin Clifford Doherty | 2:46 |
| 4. | "Ocean's Theme" (DJ Ocean) | Harle; Caroline Polachek | 3:49 |
| 5. | "On a Mountain" (DJ Danny) | Harle; Eyelar Mirzazadeh | 3:06 |
| 6. | "Piano Song" (MC Boing) | Harle; Armitage | 1:40 |
| 7. | "Do You Remember" (DJ Danny) | Harle; Mirzazadeh; Nate Campany | 3:23 |
| 8. | "All Night" (DJ Mayhem) | Harle; Birchard | 2:57 |
| 9. | "Take My Heart Away" (DJ Danny) | Harle; Mirzazadeh | 3:05 |
| 10. | "For So Long" (DJ Ocean) | Harle; Polachek | 4:18 |
| 11. | "Shining Stars" (DJ Mayhem) | Harle; Birchard; Mirzazadeh | 3:01 |
| 12. | "Car Song" (MC Boing) | Harle; Armitage | 1:31 |
| 13. | "Ti Amo" (feat. MC Spirits) (DJ Danny) | Harle; Alberto Guerrini; Hugh Alan Cornwell; Jean-Jacques Burnel; David Greenfield; Brian Duffy | 2:43 |
| Total length: | | | 37:32 |

Vinyl edition

Side A

| No. | Title | Length |
|---|---|---|
| 1. | "On a Mountain" (DJ Danny) | 3:07 |
| 2. | "All Night" (DJ Mayhem) | 2:58 |
| 3. | "Piano Song" (MC Boing) | 1:41 |

Side B

| No. | Title | Length |
|---|---|---|
| 4. | "Boing Beat" (MC Boing) | 1:33 |
| 5. | "Where Are You Now" (DJ Danny) | 3:42 |
| 6. | "For So Long" (DJ Ocean) | 4:18 |

Side C

| No. | Title | Length |
|---|---|---|
| 7. | "Interlocked" (DJ Mayhem) | 2:47 |
| 8. | "Do You Remember" (DJ Danny) | 3:24 |
| 9. | "Car Song" (MC Boing) | 1:32 |

Side D

| No. | Title | Length |
|---|---|---|
| 10. | "Ocean's Theme" (DJ Ocean) | 3:50 |
| 11. | "Take My Heart Away" (DJ Danny) | 3:05 |
| 12. | "Shining Stars" (DJ Mayhem) | 3:02 |
| 13. | "Ti Amo" (feat. MC Spirits) (DJ Danny) | 2:43 |

== Personnel ==
- Danny L Harle – production
- Nao – vocals (track 1)
- Gloria Adereti – vocals (track 1)
- Lil Data – vocals (track 2, 6, 12)
- Hannah Diamond – vocals (track 2)
- Hudson Mohawke – production (track 3, 8, 11)
- L Devine – vocals (track 3, 7)
- Caroline Polachek – vocals (tracks 4, 10)
- Georgia Twinn – vocals (track 5)
- Emily Verlander – vocals (track 8)
- Karina Ramage – vocals (track 9)
- Eyelar Mirzazadeh – vocals (track 11)
- Gabber Eleganza – vocals (track 13)
- EG Huang - art director & graphic designer

== Release history ==
| Region | Date | Format | Label | Ref. |
|---|---|---|---|---|
| Various | 26 February 2021 | Digital download; streaming | Mad Decent | |
| Various | 1 April 2021 | Double LP; CD | Mad Decent | |
