= Magic Oneohtrix Point Never =

Studio album by Oneohtrix Point Never
- Released: October 30, 2020
- Recorded: March–July 2020
- Studios: Queens, New York; Northampton, Massachusetts
- Genres: Electronic; psychedelia; pop; sound collage; plunderphonics
- Length: 47:07
- Label: Warp
- Producers: Daniel Lopatin (also exec.); Abel Tesfaye (exec.)

Oneohtrix Point Never chronology
Uncut Gems (2019)	Magic Oneohtrix Point Never (2020)	Again (2023)

Singles from Magic Oneohtrix Point Never
- 1. "Drive Time Suite" Released: September 24, 2020; 2. "Midday Suite" Released: October 26, 2020

Magic Oneohtrix Point Never is the ninth studio album by American electronic producer Daniel Lopatin, under his alias Oneohtrix Point Never, released on October 30, 2020, via Warp. The album draws on a psychedelic radio aesthetic strongly inspired by Magic 106.7, the mondegreen namesake of Lopatin's project, and was recorded during COVID-19 lockdowns, between March and July 2020.

It is the second album to heavily feature Lopatin's own vocals after Age Of, with a higher focus on songwriting. It features collaborations with The Weeknd (who also served as an executive producer for the album), Caroline Polachek, Arca and Nolanberollin. American artist Robert Beatty provided the album cover art. Both Lopatin and Beatty cooperated on art direction. Upon release, Magic Oneohtrix Point Never was met with critical acclaim and was featured on several publications' year-end lists.

== Background and composition ==
Magic Oneohtrix Point Never was conceived as an album in early 2020 after Lopatin created eclectically varied mixtapes for the Safdie brothers' radio site Elara Radio; overall, he found that "on a therapeutic scale", he "always enjoyed the comfort of listening to the radio, and of listening to people have inane discussions on podcasts". Lopatin remarked to GQ that "there's so much of me on this—even the collaborations are appropriate [to when I started out]". In comparison, the album is themed around a psychedelic radio aesthetic and features four "Cross Talk" interludes, collages of "archival recordings of various American FM stations' "format flips", in which detourned DJ sign-offs collide with advertisements and self-help mantras", marking each periodic stage of the album.

Lopatin said of his intent with creating Magic Oneohtrix Point Never that:

I wanted to make a cohesive, punchy, 50-minute record that was very personal, but pulled from FM palettes that I was personally interested in [...] I think it works really well as a metaphor for how I've changed. The things that I try to understand about my own life and being an avid musical listener and how much that's influenced me as a musician is kind of apparent on this record. That metaphor of transformation is something that I came to by thinking about the radio.

The press release issued by Warp upon the album's announcement, especially concerning the album's concept, tone and use of textures, stated that it "loosely summons the broadcasting logic of radio dayparts, switching on in the morning and closing very late at night, while seamlessly latticed together with kaleidoscopic, twitchy transformations of sound between the dials to form a darkly humorous reflection on American music culture", concluding by referring to the album's style as "maximalist baroque-pop within atmospheric glitter".

== Release ==
Lopatin began teasing the album on September 22, 2020, posting a video teaser stating the album title to social media platforms. He announced the album and its tracklist on September 25; the announcement also came with the release of the "Drive Time Suite", a single release consisting of the first three songs off of the album: "Cross Talk I", "Auto & Allo" and "Long Road Home".

On October 14, Lopatin released the music video for "Long Road Home", co-directed by Charlie Fox and Emily Schubert. The stopmotion animated video pays homage to the 1982 short film Le Ravissement de Frank N. Stein, which was also adapted on Lopatin's 2013 Oneohtrix Point Never album, R Plus Seven. The song would later be reworked and rereleased as the B-side to Caroline Polachek's 2022 single "Billions".

On October 27, Lopatin released the "Midday Suite", another single release containing the next five tracks of the album, "Cross Talk II", "I Don't Love Me Anymore", "Bow Ecco", "The Whether Channel" and "No Nightmares". Lopatin also shared the personnel for the album on the same day to social media.

== Critical reception ==
Professional ratings
Aggregate scores
Source	Rating
AnyDecentMusic?	7.4/10
Metacritic	81/100
Review scores
Source	Rating
AllMusic	4.5/5 stars
Beats per Minute	77%
Clash	8/10
Consequence of Sound	B
Exclaim!	5/10
Loud and Quiet	8/10
Mojo	4/5 stars
MusicOMH	4/5 stars
Pitchfork	7.7/10
Uncut	8/10

Magic Oneohtrix Point Never was met with acclaim from music critics upon its release. At Metacritic, the album received a score of 81 out of 100 based on 11 critics, indicating "universal acclaim".

In the review for AllMusic, Heather Phares writes that, "Lopatin builds on radio's power to connect people through music even from a distance, and the way he combines all the facets of his music feels like going up and down the dial. The flowing synth instrumentals of his earliest work sit next to Garden of Delete and Age Of's subverted pop songs, and they're all surrounded by collages of DJ chatter that hark back to Replica's nimble plunderphonics." Another positive review by Philip Sherburne states that "Whether sampled, synthesized, or acoustic, they are rich with implicit physicality, evocative of stretching and striking; processed voices are carved into curved, glistening shapes, uncanny as ice sculptures. It's a ridiculously opulent palette."

Accolades for Magic Oneohtrix Point Never
Publication	Accolade	Rank	Ref.
Stereogum	The 50 Best Albums of 2020	7	
Bleep	Bleep's Top 10 Albums of the Year 2020	2	
Noisey	The 100 Best Albums of 2020	53	
AllMusic	AllMusic's 100 Favorite Albums of 2020	N/A	
Consequence of Sound	Consequence of Sound's Top 50 Albums of 2020	31	
Gorilla vs. Bear	Gorilla vs. Bear's Albums of 2020	18	
FLOOD	FLOOD's Best Albums of 2020	7	
Les Inrocks	Les Inrocks' Top 100 Albums of 2020	45	
MusicOMH	musicOMH's Top 50 Albums Of 2020	42	
The A.V. Club	The 20 best albums of 2020	16	
Vinyl Me, Please	Best Albums of 2020	N/A	
Time Magazine	Best Songs of 2020	10	
Rolling Stone	Rob Sheffield's Top 25 Songs of 2020	13	
Pitchfork	The 100 Best Songs of 2020	75	
The Fader	The 100 Best Songs of the Year	48	

== Track listing ==
All tracks written by Daniel Lopatin, except where noted; all tracks produced by Daniel Lopatin.

No.	Title	Writer(s)	Length
1.	"Cross Talk I"		0:22
2.	"Auto & Allo"		3:21
3.	"Long Road Home"		3:32
4.	"Cross Talk II"		0:49
5.	"I Don't Love Me Anymore"		2:54
6.	"Bow Ecco"		2:11
7.	"The Whether Channel"		6:08
8.	"No Nightmares"	Daniel Lopatin; Abel Tesfaye	4:06
9.	"Cross Talk III"		0:12
10.	"Tales from the Trash Stratum"		3:28
11.	"Answering Machine"		0:58
12.	"Imago"		3:48
13.	"Cross Talk IV / Radio Lonelys"		1:08
14.	"Lost But Never Alone"		4:18
15.	"Shifting"		1:54
16.	"Wave Idea"		3:21
17.	"Nothing's Special"		4:37
Total length:			47:07

Japanese edition (bonus track)
No.	Title	Length
18.	"Ambien1"

Blu-ray Edition
No.	Title	Length
18.	"Lost But Never Alone" (A. G. Cook Remix)
19.	"Tales from the Trash Stratum" (featuring Elizabeth Fraser)
20.	"Nothing's Special" (featuring Rosalía)
21.	"Lost But Never Alone" (Forced Smile Edit)

Sample credits

- "Cross Talk II" contains a sample from "Wasn't the Summer Short", written by Ruth Newman and performed by Peter Nero.
- "Shifting" contains a sample from "Reconquering Our Kingdom" by Mournlord.

== Personnel ==
=== Musicians ===
- Daniel Lopatin – vocals, production, engineering (all tracks), executive production
- Caroline Polachek – vocals ("Long Road Home"), additional vocals ("No Nightmares"), additional engineering ("No Nightmares"), additional vocal engineering ("Long Road Home")
- Nolanberollin – vocals ("The Whether Channel"), additional vocal engineering ("The Whether Channel")
- The Weeknd – vocals ("No Nightmares"), executive production
- Shin Kamiyama – additional engineering ("No Nightmares")
- Matt Cohn – additional engineering ("No Nightmares")
- Nate Boyce – additional guitar synth ("Lost But Never Alone")
- Arca – vocals ("Shifting")

=== Technical ===
- Matt Cohn – mixing (all tracks, except "Lost But Never Alone")
- Daniel Lopatin – mixing ("Lost But Never Alone")
- Ryan Schwabe – mastering (all tracks)

== Charts ==
Chart (2020)	Peak position
Dutch Vinyl Albums (MegaCharts)	14
Scottish Albums (Official Charts)	65
UK Album Sales (OCC)	54
UK Independent Albums (Official Charts)	15
US Heatseekers Albums (Billboard)	13
US Top Album Sales (Billboard)	65
US Top Dance Albums (Billboard)	8
US Indie Store Album Sales (Billboard)	16
