= In My Dreams (Danny L Harle song) =

Single by Danny L Harle
- Released: 8 October 2014
- Length: 3:27
- Label: PC Music
- Songwriter: Danny L Harle
- Producer: Danny L Harle

Danny L Harle singles chronology
"Broken Flowers" (2013)	"In My Dreams" (2014)	"Forever" (2015)

"In My Dreams" (2014)
The airy vocals on "In My Dreams" have a hook similar to Nelly's "Dilemma" featuring Kelly Rowland.

"In My Dreams" is a song by the British musician Danny L Harle, released as a single on 8 October 2014 through PC Music. It features uncredited vocals from the singer Raffy. It has a jumpy, upbeat rhythm with a xylophone part, and Raffy's vocals are cheerful but detached. Noisey ranked "In My Dreams" 8th on its list of the best songs of 2014, and Complex magazine placed the song 14th on its year-end list. It was later included in the compilation album PC Music Volume 1 (2015).
