= Mia Khalifa =

Lebanese-American media personality (born 1993)

- ميا خليفة
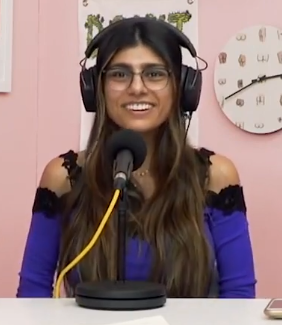
- Khalifa in 2019
- Born: Sarah Joe Chamoun سارة جو شمعون; February 10, 1993 (age 33); Beirut, Lebanon
- Education: University of Texas at El Paso (BA)
- Occupations: Pornographic film actress; webcam model; social media personality; sports commentator
- Years active: 2014–present
- Spouse: Robert Sandberg (m. 2019; sep. 2020)

Sarah Joe Chamoun (Note: Arabic: سارة جو شمعون.) (born February 10, 1993), known professionally as Mia Khalifa, (Note: English pronunciation: /ˈmiːə kəˈliːfə/ MEE-ə kə-LEE-fə; Arabic: ميا خليفة, pronounced [ˈmijaː χaˈliːfa(h)].) is a Lebanese-American media personality and former pornographic film actress. In 2014, she performed in a controversial porn scene featuring a hijab, which drew global attention. The scene made Khalifa immensely popular but also drew backlash.

Despite the brevity of her three-month career in adult films, Khalifa was voted the top porn star on Pornhub in 2015. The website xHamster reported that she was the most-searched-for pornographic actress of 2016. In 2018, she became the most-searched-for actress on Pornhub.

After leaving the adult industry, Khalifa has worked as a webcam model, an OnlyFans creator, and a sports commentator, and has advocated for sex workers' rights. She launched her own line of jewelry in 2023.

== Early life ==
Khalifa was born on February 10, 1993 in Beirut, Lebanon. She was raised Catholic in what she described as a "very conservative" home. She attended a private French-language school in Beirut, where she also learned to speak English. Khalifa's family left their home in the wake of the South Lebanon conflict, moving to the United States in 2001.

Khalifa lived with her family in Montgomery County, Maryland, where she played lacrosse in high school. She said she was bullied at school for being "the darkest and weirdest girl there", which intensified after the September 11 attacks. She attended Massanutten Military Academy in Woodstock, Virginia, and later graduated from the University of Texas at El Paso with a Bachelor of Arts in history. She supported herself during college by working as a bartender, model, and "briefcase girl" on a local Deal or No Deal–style Spanish-language game show.

== Career ==
=== Pornographic film career ===
Khalifa entered the pornographic film industry in October 2014, after being recruited by a man who asked her if she was interested in nude modeling. Her stage name was taken from the name of her dog, Mia, and American rapper Wiz Khalifa.

She came to widespread attention after the release of a scene from Bang Bros in which she wears a hijab during a threesome with Julianna Vega and Sean Lawless. The scene brought Khalifa instant popularity, as well as criticism from writers and religious figures, and led to her parents publicly disowning her. Alex Hawkins, vice president of marketing for xHamster, said, "The outrage it caused in the Arab world ended up being a bit of a 'Streisand effect'. Suddenly, everyone was searching for her. The effort to censor her only made her more ubiquitous." With more than 1.5 million views, the 22-year-old Khalifa became the most searched-for performer on the adult video sharing website Pornhub. She would be voted the number one performer on the website in 2018.

During her rise to prominence, Khalifa received online death threats, including a digitally manipulated image of her being beheaded by the Islamic State. She also received a warning that she would be "the first person in Hellfire", to which she jokingly replied, "I've been meaning to get a little tan recently." Khalifa criticized Lebanese newspapers for printing articles about her instead of "more important" topics such as politics and terrorism.

In an interview with The Washington Post, Khalifa said the controversial scene was satirical and should be taken as such, claiming that Hollywood films depict Muslims in a far more negative way than any pornographer could. Among those who publicly defended her was the British-Lebanese author Nasri Atallah, who stated, "as a woman, she is free to do as she pleases with her body. As a sentient human being with agency, who lives halfway across the world, she is in charge of her own life and owes absolutely nothing to the country where she happened to be born." Khalifa said, "Women's rights in Lebanon are a long way from being taken seriously if a Lebanese American porn star that no longer resides there can cause such an uproar."

According to data from Pornhub, from January 3 to 6, 2015, searches for Khalifa increased five-fold. Around a quarter of those searches came from Lebanon, with a substantial number of searches also from the nearby countries of Syria and Jordan. Almaza, a Lebanese brewery, ran an advertisement showing a bottle of its beer next to Khalifa's signature glasses, with the slogan: "We are both rated 18+." In January 2015, pop-rap duo Timeflies released a song titled "Mia Khalifa" in homage to her.

In January 2015, Khalifa signed a long-term contract with Bang Bros' parent company, WGCZ Holding, which also owns XVideos, the largest free porn site. The contract required her to perform in multiple films each month. However, two weeks later, Khalifa had a change of heart and resigned. The negative attention she received following her rise to prominence prompted her to leave the industry. In an interview with Playboy, she said, "It was an eye-opener for me. I don't want any of this, whether it's positive or negative—but all of it was negative. I didn't think too much into it about how my friends and family and relationships were suffering." WGCZ Holding owns a web page with a domain name using her stage name. Khalifa said it does not pay her for rights, even though it is written in her first-person voice.

In a July 2016 interview with The Washington Post, Khalifa stated that she had only performed in pornography for three months and had left the industry over a year before, changing to a "more normal job". She said, "I guess it was my rebellious phase. It wasn't really for me. I kind of smartened up and tried to distance myself from that." She said she continued to perform as a webcam model for Bang Bros for eleven months after she stopped shooting scenes, before Complex Networks asked her to host a sports show. Carter Cruise, a former porn performer who became a disc jockey, criticized Khalifa for reinforcing the social stigma against sex work by distancing herself from her previous career.

In January 2017, xHamster reported that Khalifa was the most-searched-for adult actress of 2016. In 2018, three years after leaving the industry, she was still the second-highest-ranked performer on Pornhub. In August 2019, Khalifa stated that she made $12,000 working in porn by making an estimated $1,000 per scene, and that she did not receive residuals from Bang Bros or from Pornhub and other free sites where Bang Bros uploaded the videos. According to Alec Helmy, president of the adult entertainment industry news site XBIZ, Khalifa's pay was standard for the industry. While Pornhub has not stated how much revenue Khalifa's videos have generated for the website, Social Blade CEO Jason Urgo estimated in 2019 that she could have made over $500,000 as a Pornhub partner.

In July 2020, more than 1.5 million people signed a Change.org petition campaigning for Khalifa's videos to be removed from sites like Pornhub and Bang Bros, and for her Internet domains to be returned to her. Bang Bros sent her a cease and desist letter and set up a website to dispute statements she made about the company. Bang Bros stated that Khalifa earned over $178,000 from them and their affiliates and was in the adult film industry for more than two years.

=== Other ventures ===
After three months working as an adult-film actress, Khalifa worked in Miami as a paralegal and bookkeeper. She later transitioned into a career as a social media personality and webcam model, posting about style, food, and politics on networks such as Instagram, TikTok, and Twitter. She sells sexually explicit material directly to subscribers on OnlyFans. Khalifa also runs a YouTube channel; livestreams on Twitch; sells photoshoots, merchandise, and access to exclusive content on the membership website Patreon; and sold explicit photos and videos on the social media website Findrow.

Khalifa has used her social media presence to support professional sports teams from the Washington, D.C., area. She and Gilbert Arenas hosted Out of Bounds, a daily sports show on Complex News' YouTube channel, from October 2017 to February 2018. Khalifa then co-hosted Sportsball with Tyler Coe on Rooster Teeth. Its final episode was released on October 30, 2018.

In May 2020, Khalifa made a guest appearance as herself in the Hulu show Ramy. The following year, she made a cameo appearance in Bella Poarch's music video for "Build a Bitch". She plays a woman created in a factory who joins a rebellion led by Poarch.

In June 2023, Khalifa launched a jewelry line called "Sheytan", an anglicized form of the Arabic word for "devil", alongside Sara Burn, a former Virgil Abloh collaborator. Khalifa was featured in the Fall/Winter 2023 campaign for the London-based fashion label Aries as well as a photo book that was released the same year, titled Mia by Aries. The founder of the brand, Sofia Prantera, considers Khalifa to be her muse, stating "I felt immediately inspired by Mia's 'Punk' attitude. She is strong but extremely humble, and under her glossy appearance here is a tough young girl who has had to fight her way through so much adversity. I wanted to capture her wild spirit; raw and unpolished."

== Personal life ==
Khalifa married her high school boyfriend in February 2011. They separated in 2014 and divorced in 2016. In 2019, she married Swedish professional chef Robert Sandberg; they separated in 2020. From 2021 to 2022, she was in a relationship with Puerto Rican rapper and singer Jhayco.

Khalifa has stated that her parents disowned her because of her adult film career. Some Arab news outlets published a statement by Khalifa's family in 2015 condemning her involvement in pornography.

In August 2021, Khalifa auctioned the glasses she had worn in several adult films to raise funds for victims of the 2020 Beirut explosion.

=== Religious and political views ===
In 2015, Khalifa stated that she was no longer a practicing Catholic. She has a tattoo of the opening line of the National Anthem of Lebanon in Arabic and another of the Lebanese Forces Cross, which she said was to "show solidarity with [her] father's political views" following a 2012 bombing in Beirut. She told Newsweek that critics have claimed that her tattoos "disgrace Lebanon".

In 2021, Khalifa criticized U.S. military aid to Israel and called Israel an "apartheid state", which sparked backlash online. Following the Hamas-led attack on Israel on 7 October 2023, Khalifa voiced support for Palestine. In response to her comments, Playboy and an Amsterdam-based drug product company cancelled business partnerships with her.

== In popular culture ==
In November 2016, an online petition called for Khalifa to be appointed by President-elect Donald Trump as the next United States Ambassador to Saudi Arabia.

In 2018, the musical duo iLoveFriday released a diss track called "Mia Khalifa", in response to a fake tweet posted by a user impersonating Khalifa. The song became an internet meme after the "hit or miss" snippet gained popularity on the TikTok app. At the time, it was said to be one of the most well-known viral TikTok memes in the Western world, and had been used in over four million TikTok videos.

During a 2021 Brazilian parliamentary commission meeting related to the COVID-19 pandemic, Senator Luis Carlos Heinze mentioned that a study published in The Lancet on the effectiveness of chloroquine as a COVID-19 treatment was carried out by a company whose sales manager was a pornographic film actress. In response, Senator Randolfe Rodrigues jokingly proposed "summon[ing] Mia Khalifa". Khalifa then wrote on Twitter, "I'm not a doctor, so don't take medical advice from fake memes of me you found on WhatsApp."

== See also ==
- Pornography in the Middle East
- Women in the Arab world
- Women in Lebanon
