= Billions (song) =

Single by Caroline Polachek

from the album Desire, I Want to Turn Into You
- B-side: "Long Road Home"
- Released: February 9, 2022
- Genre: Progressive pop
- Length: 4:57
- Label: Perpetual Novice
- Songwriters: Caroline Polachek; Danny L Harle
- Producers: Caroline Polachek; Danny L Harle

Caroline Polachek singles chronology
"Awful Things" (2021)	"Billions" (2022)	"Sirens" (2022)

Music video
- "Billions" on YouTube

"Billions" is a song by American singer-songwriter and record producer Caroline Polachek. It was released on February 9, 2022 as the second single from Polachek's fourth album, Desire, I Want to Turn Into You (2023).

== Background and composition ==
Polachek played the song live on her Heart is Unbreaking US tour in late 2021, and on several fall 2021 festival dates before the single was officially released.

A September 2021 New Yorker profile on Polachek explained the song's backstory as follows:

[…] One day, Danny L Harle sent her a beat that he'd written, and Polachek heard a melody out of nowhere, oceanic and potent, and started jotting down psychedelic images: a headless angel, an overflowing cup, a pearl inside an oyster. The beat and the images became the song "Billions". [Polachek said she] "wanted something that captured the afterglow of a reopening."

As the B-side of the single, Polachek released a reworked version of "Long Road Home", her collaboration with Oneohtrix Point Never from his 2020 album Magic Oneohtrix Point Never.

== Reception ==
The song was met with widespread critical acclaim. Pitchfork named the song a 'Best New Track', and in a review contributor Gio Santiago wrote that "Billions" is "a lucent pathway towards a new era for the pop auteur". The Fader's Jordan Daville wrote that, with "Billions", Harle and Polachek created "a kind of divine symmetry from its elements, channeling Pure Moods-era new age into something utterly splendid". Kat Bouza from Rolling Stone described "Billions" as "a trip-hop inspired, hallucinogenic epic that finds the songwriter expanding upon the inventive production style perfected on her critically acclaimed 2019 album, Pang."

=== Year-end lists ===
Year-end lists for "Billions"
Publication	List	Rank	Ref.
Beats Per Minute	The 50 Best Songs of 2022	29	
Exclaim!	The 25 Best Songs of 2022	24	
The Fader	The 100 Best Songs of 2022	65	
Gorilla vs. Bear	Best Songs of 2022	4	
The New York Times	The Best Songs of 2022	22	
Paste	The 50 Best Songs of 2022	28	
Pitchfork	The 100 Best Songs of 2022	20	
The Quietus	Top 50 Tracks Of 2022	44	
Slant Magazine	The 50 Best Songs of 2022	14	

== Track listing ==
Digital single

1. "Billions" – 4:57
2. "Long Road Home" (featuring Oneohtrix Point Never) – 3:44

== Charts ==
Chart performance for "Billions"
Chart (2022)	Peak position
UK Singles Sales (OCC)	37
