= Bunny Is a Rider =

Single by Caroline Polachek

from the album Desire, I Want to Turn Into You
- Released: July 14, 2021
- Genre: Pop; avant-pop; electropop
- Length: 3:17
- Label: Perpetual Novice
- Songwriter: Caroline Polachek
- Producers: Polachek; Danny L Harle

Caroline Polachek singles chronology
"Breathless" (2020)	"Bunny Is a Rider" (2021)	"New Shapes" (2021)

Music video
- "Bunny Is a Rider" on YouTube

"Bunny Is a Rider" is a song by American singer-songwriter and producer Caroline Polachek, released on July 14, 2021, through Perpetual Novice. It is the lead single from her fourth studio album Desire, I Want to Turn Into You. Written and co-produced by Polachek, it features production by frequent collaborator Danny L Harle. The song received critical acclaim and was named the best song of 2021 by Pitchfork.

== Background and composition ==
Upon releasing the song, Polachek referred to "Bunny Is a Rider" as "a summer jam about being unavailable". Keeping the identity of "Bunny" a mystery, she revealed, "Bunny is slippery, impossible to get ahold of. Maybe it's a fantasy, maybe it's a bad attitude. But anyone can be Bunny, at least for three minutes and seventeen seconds". The production features "a scorching bass performance from producer Danny L Harle, plus his baby daughter's first vocal cameo".

== Critical reception ==
The song was met with widespread critical acclaim. Jordan Darville of The Fader labeled the song "avant-pop". Describing the song as "gently groovy and full of the vocal wizardry Polachek does so well", it was later included on the magazine's "weekly Songs You Need playlist". Praising the track, Robin Murray at Clash Music opined that the song is a "fantastic piece of electronic pop" and an "extraordinary return" of Polachek. Jade Gomez at Paste felt like the song was a change of pace for Polachek, viewing the release as "a sonic departure from Polachek's dreamy, introspective indie-pop as she veers into spicier territories". The prominent "whistles transport listeners into a Caribbean paradise as Polachek reflects on operating untethered to anyone or anything". The writers of DIY called the song a "futuristic-pop bop". James Rettig at Stereogum noted the "twitchy and smooth" production, complemented by Polachek's "gliding, stuttering processed vocals".

The song was ranked as the number-one song of 2021 and the fourth best song of the first half of the 2020s by Pitchfork.

Year-end lists for "Bunny Is a Rider"
Publication	List	Rank	Ref.
Consequence	Top 50 Songs of 2021	11	
Gigwise	The Gigwise 20 Best Tracks of 2021	5	
The Guardian	The 20 best songs of 2021	4	
The New York Times	Lindsay Zoladz's Top 25 Best Songs of 2021	15	
NME	The 50 best songs of 2021	17	
Pitchfork	Top 100 Songs of 2021	1	
Uproxx	The Best Songs of 2021	Placed	

== Music video ==
The music video was released on July 26, 2021, and was directed by Matt Copson, while Polachek herself served as a co-director. The scenery is set in "a dimly lit labyrinth of boxes". Polachek is then seen leading the camera towards "different sections of the maze", passing by boxes that contain taped labels with words like "rocket science", "geese" and "dark crystals". Brit Dawson at Dazed Digital drew comparisons to Tomb Raider and Alice in Wonderland.
