= Danny L Harle =

British music producer and composer

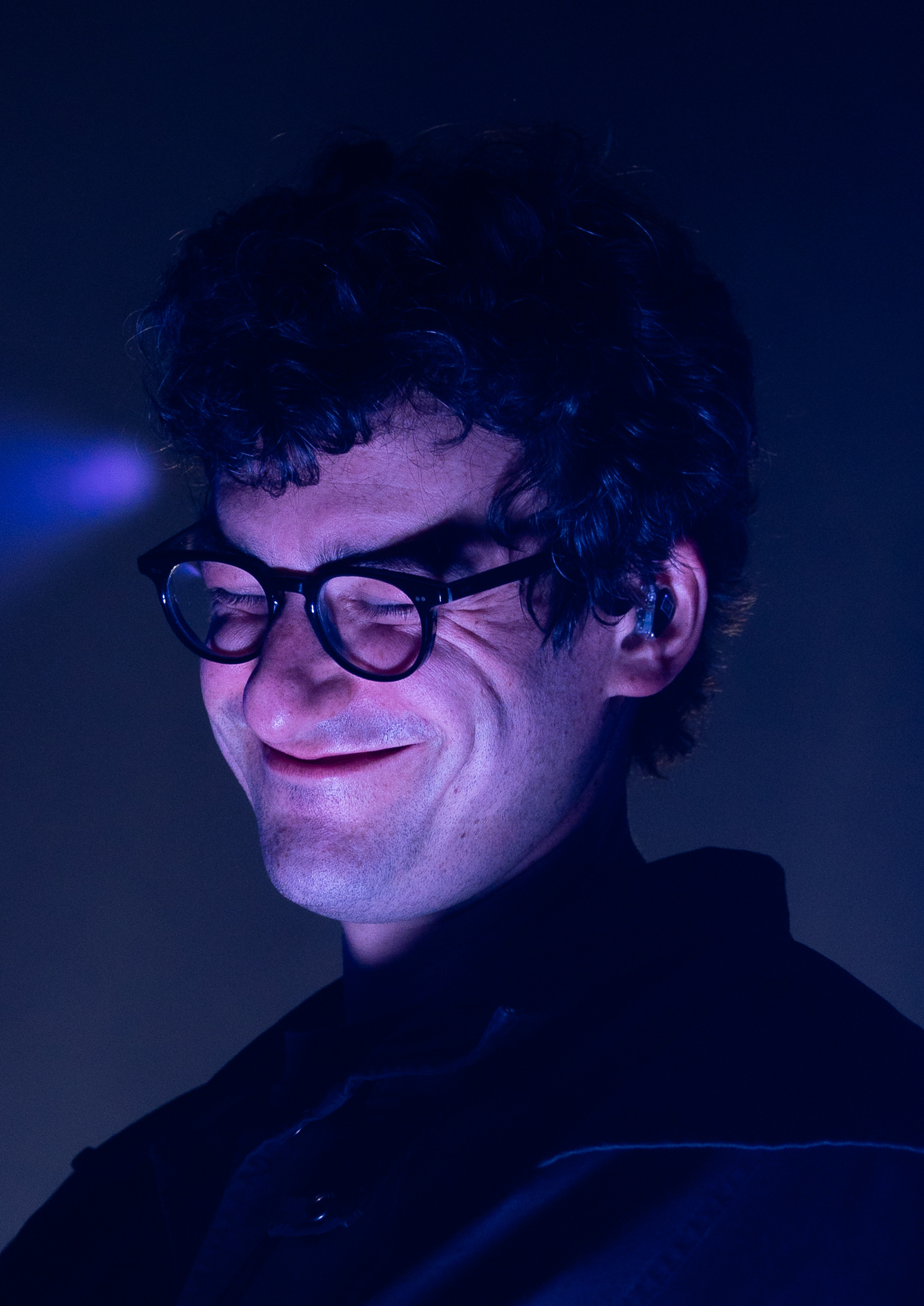
- Harle in 2026

Background information
- Born: Daniel Jack Eisner Harle; 25 September 1989 (age 36)
- Origin: London, England
- Genres: Electronic; pop; hyperpop; rave; classical
- Occupations: Producer; composer
- Works: Discography
- Years active: 2010–present
- Labels: PC Music; Mad Decent; Columbia; XL
- Website: dannylharle.com

Daniel Jack Eisner Harle, better known under the stage name Danny L Harle (born 25 September 1989), is a British music producer and composer. He was formerly signed to the London-based PC Music label and is a member of Dux Content with A. G. Cook. He has produced, composed, and remixed music for a number of artists; most prominently, he executive produced Caroline Polachek's albums Pang (2019) and Desire, I Want to Turn Into You (2023) and co-produced the albums Radical Optimism by Dua Lipa and Polari by Olly Alexander. Harle released his debut album Harlecore in 2021, followed by Cerulean in 2026, which featured collaborations with Polachek, Lipa, PinkPantheress, Clairo, and Julia Michaels.

== Early life ==
Harle is the son of saxophonist John Harle. He played the cello as a child but did not have a strong interest in music until age 12, when he learned bass guitar after discovering bands like Slipknot and Madness. Harle is privately educated, having attended the £30,000 per annum King Alfred School in Hampstead. He later joined the Royal Academy of Music's junior jazz group. In 2006, John Harle recorded Daniel's song "Caesar Hath Wept" with the Duke Quartet.

Harle went to Goldsmiths, University of London to study classical music. He began recording campy electronic music in 2010, influenced by Scandinavian skweee music. His thesis was chamber music that combined traditional musical instruments with video game consoles playing The Legend of Zelda: Ocarina of Time and Street Fighter II: The World Warrior.

== Career ==
=== 2013–2014: Early beginnings with PC Music ===
While at Goldsmiths, Harle reconnected with A. G. Cook, with whom he had attended school as a teenager. The two bonded over their shared musical tastes and interest in comedy duo Tim & Eric. This grew into a musical project called Dux Content. Since they did not have a vocalist, Dux Content focused on musical experiments like compound metres and changes in tempo. One of their earlier works is a collection of compositions for the Disklavier reproducing piano, released with Spencer Noble and Tim Phillips under the name "Dux Consort". Dux Content released its songs with strange renderings of digital avatars for promotional artwork. They contributed to the score for Alicia Norman's animated film Heart of Death and began considering a children's television show titled Dux Content's Jungle Jam. Harle and Cook explored how to build rhythms out of a vocalist's natural singing tempo and released the results as "Dux Kidz".

Harle's work with Cook allowed him to branch into pop songwriting and production. He initially struggled to replicate the vigor and simplicity of pop music. After producer Enchanté invited him to perform at a gallery in Stroud, Harle felt guilty at the prospect of playing music by other artists. He decided to write a song that would fit with 1990s dance music. The resulting track, "Broken Flowers", was released on Cook's fledgling PC Music label in mid 2013. Harle described the song as "completely frivolous", explaining that he was "trying to make the most completely conventional song." "Broken Flowers" uses rapid trance arpeggios, an organ bassline, and synthesiser parts similar to work by video game composers Koji Kondo and Nobuo Uematsu. It was viewed as one of the label's more mature releases for the twist in its rhyme scheme. Fact magazine placed "Broken Flowers" 79th on its list of the "100 best tracks of the decade so far".

"In My Dreams" (2014)
The airy vocals on "In My Dreams" have a hook similar to Nelly's "Dilemma" featuring Kelly Rowland.

Harle worked on the sound design for John Harle's 2014 album The Tyburn Tree with singer Marc Almond. That October, Harle released his second single "In My Dreams" with singer Raffy. It has a jumpy, upbeat rhythm with a xylophone part, and Raffy's vocals are cheerful but detached. Noisey ranked "In My Dreams" 8th on its list of the best songs of 2014, and Complex magazine placed the song 14th on its year-end list. For Christmas of 2014, Harle and Raffy recorded a cover of East 17's 1994 Christmas number one "Stay Another Day". He stated in February 2015 that, although he has enough tracks to make an album, he is focusing on recording new songs with Raffy.

=== 2013–2015: Broken Flowers and 1UL EPs ===
"Broken Flowers" was rereleased as a single from an EP of the same name in late 2015, peaking at 43 on the Billboard Emerging Artists Charts and making it onto the 'A List' of BBC Radio 1's radio playlists in early 2016, recognition from the BBC marking a large step forward for the artist.

On 6 May 2016, Harle released the single "Ashes of Love" via PC Music, featuring guest vocals from Caroline Polachek, who was at the time half of the American indie pop duo Chairlift. Harle would follow this single up with "Super Natural." featuring prominent guest vocals from Canadian pop star Carly Rae Jepsen. An official music video starring Harle and Jepsen, directed by music video duo Bradley & Pablo (who had also previously directed music videos for PC Music's Hannah Diamond as well as label affiliates QT and Charli XCX), was released one week later on 19 August 2016.

After the EP, Harle continued to work with other artists and teamed up with rising Australian rapper and singer Tkay Maidza for their collaborative single "Bom Bom", which became an instant internet sensation. "Blue Angel", a single featuring vocals from bedroom singer, songwriter and record producer Clairo, was released in February 2018. The two also worked together on the track "B.O.M.D." on Clairo's Diary 001 EP the same year.

=== 2019–present: Pang, Harlecore, and Desire, I Want to Turn Into You ===
While he continued producing, songwriting, and remixing for many other artists (including Nile Rodgers & Chic, Betta Lemme, and Tommy Cash), Harle did not put out another single until September 2019 when his collaborative single "Part of Me" with PC Music labelmate Hannah Diamond was released accompanied by a lyric video.

Harle also executive produced Caroline Polachek's 2019 album Pang alongside Polachek, co-producing and co-writing several of the album's tracks. Harle returned for Polachek's 2023 album Desire, I Want to Turn Into You, co-producing and co-writing almost all of the album's tracks. Harle received a Grammy nomination for Best Engineered Album, Non-Classical for his work on Desire.

Harle has also become known for his rave-influenced "Harlecore" sound in his original music. In 2021, Harle announced his debut full-length solo album Harlecore for release on February 26 of that same year through Mad Decent, alongside the singles "Boing Beat", "On a Mountain", "Interlocked" and "Ocean's Theme". The album features Harle taking on the personas of four different DJs, each with their own distinct rave-inspired sound.

Harle co-produced Dua Lipa's "Houdini" with Tame Impala, released in November 2023. The track is the lead single for Lipa's third album, Radical Optimism, with Harle's production receiving praise for its "drive and loony spark".

On 16 December 2023, the BBC announced that Olly Alexander would be representing the United Kingdom at the Eurovision Song Contest 2024 with a song Harle had co-written. Harle subsequently produced Alexander's debut album Polari, which was released on 7 February 2025.

On 8 July 2025 Harle released "Starlight" featuring English singer PinkPantheress. His second album, Cerulean, was released on 13 February 2026.

== Personal life ==
Harle has been married to Poppy Cosyns since January 2018. Together, they have a daughter, Nico, born in November 2018; her voice was used in the Caroline Polachek song "Bunny Is a Rider", and subsequently Harle's own song "Island (da da da)". Former PC Music labelmate GFOTY is her godmother. The couple had another daughter, Cosima, in 2022.

== Discography ==
- Harlecore (2021)
- Cerulean (2026)
