= Caroline Polachek discography =

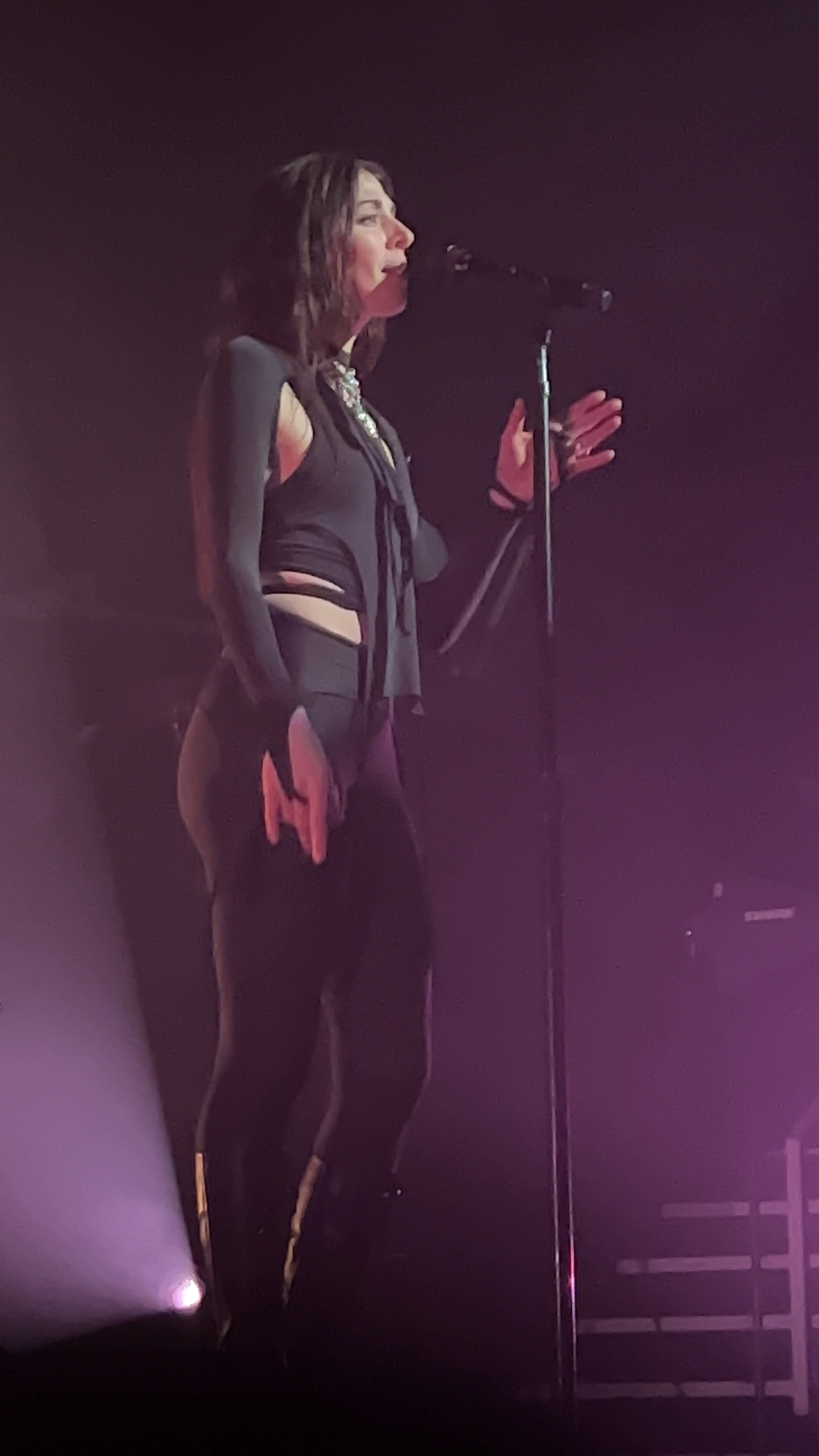
- Polachek performing at First Avenue in December 2021
- Studio albums: 4
- EPs: 2
- Singles: 13
- Instrumental album: 1
- Remix album: 1
- Promotional singles: 7

The discography of American singer-songwriter and producer Caroline Polachek consists of four studio albums, one remix album, one instrumental album, two extended plays, 13 singles, and seven promotional singles. Polachek previously released music under the names Ramona Lisa and CEP, before releasing her debut album under her real name in 2019. She also issued three albums as a member of the band Chairlift, from 2008 to 2016.

== Albums ==
=== Studio albums ===
List of studio albums, with selected details and peak chart positions shown
Title	Details	Peak chart positions									
Title	Details	US	US Heat	US Indie	AUS	BEL (FL)	GER	NLD	NZ	UK	UK Indie
Arcadia (Credited as Ramona Lisa)	Released: April 15, 2014; Label: Terrible Records; Formats: CD, LP, digital download, streaming	—	—	—	—	—	—	—	—	—	—
Drawing the Target Around the Arrow (Credited as CEP)	Released: January 27, 2017; Label: Pannonica; Formats: Digital download, streaming	—	—	—	—	—	—	—	—	—	—
Pang	Released: October 18, 2019; Label: Perpetual Novice, The Orchard, Sony; Formats: CD, LP, digital download, streaming	— (Note: Pang did not enter the Billboard 200, but peaked at number 95 on the Top Current Albums chart.)	17	40	—	—	—	—	—	—	4
Desire, I Want to Turn Into You	Released: February 14, 2023; Label: Perpetual Novice, The Orchard, Sony; Formats: CD, LP, digital download, streaming	87	13	19	53	48	44	35	31	23	2
"—" denotes items which were not released in that country or failed to chart.

=== Instrumental albums ===
List of instrumental albums, with selected details
Title	Details
Pang (Instrumental)	Released: April 11, 2020; Formats: Streaming

=== Remix albums ===
List of remix albums, with selected details
Title	Details
Standing at the Gate: Remix Collection	Released: April 16, 2021; Label: Perpetual Novice; Formats: LP

== Extended plays ==
List of EPs, with selected details
Title	Details
Dominic (Credited as Ramona Lisa)	Released: September 5, 2014; Label: Terrible; Formats: Digital download, streaming
Piano Versions (Credited as Ramona Lisa)	Released: March 9, 2015; Label: Terrible; Formats: Digital download, streaming

== Singles ==
=== As lead artist ===
List of singles as lead artist, with selected peak chart positions
Title	Year	Peak chart positions		Certifications	Album
Title	Year	US Rock	UK Sales	Certifications	Album
"Arcadia"	2014	―	―		Arcadia
"Backwards and Upwards"	2014	―	―		Arcadia
"Dominic"	2014	―	―		Arcadia
"Door"	2019	―	―		Pang
"Ocean of Tears"	2019	―	―		Pang
"Parachute"	2019	―	―		Pang
"So Hot You're Hurting My Feelings"	2019	27	―	RIAA: Gold	Pang
"Look at Me Now"	2019	―	―		Pang
"Breathless"	2020	―	―		Standing at the Gate: Remix Collection
"Bunny Is a Rider"	2021	―	―		Desire, I Want to Turn Into You
"Billions"	2022	―	37		Desire, I Want to Turn Into You
"Last Days: Non Voglio Mai Vedere II Sole Tramontare" (with 12 Ensemble)	2022	―	―		Non-album single
"Sunset"	2022	―	―		Desire, I Want to Turn Into You
"Welcome to My Island"	2022	―	―		Desire, I Want to Turn Into You
"Blood and Butter"	2023	―	―		Desire, I Want to Turn Into You
"Dang"	2023	—	—		Desire, I Want to Turn Into You: Everasking Edition
"Butterfly Net" (featuring Weyes Blood)	2024	—	—		Desire, I Want to Turn Into You: Everasking Edition
"Starburned and Unkissed"	2024	—	—		I Saw the TV Glow (Original Soundtrack)
"On the Beach"	2025	—	—		Death Stranding 2 (Songs from the Video Game)
"The Field" (with Blood Orange, Tariq Al-Sabir and Daniel Caesar featuring the Durutti Column)	2025	—	—		Essex Honey
"Mind Loaded" (with Blood Orange, Lorde and Mustafa)	2025	—	—		Essex Honey

=== Promotional singles ===
List of promotional singles
Title	Year	Album
"So Hot You're Hurting My Feelings" (A. G. Cook Remix)	2019	Standing at the Gate: Remix Collection
"The Gate" (Extended Mix)	2020	Standing at the Gate: Remix Collection
"Ocean of Tears" (Umru Remix)	2020	Non-album promotional single
"Hey Big Eyes" (George Clanton Remix)	2020	Standing at the Gate: Remix Collection
"Hit Me Where It Hurts" (Toro y Moi Remix) (featuring Chino Moreno)	2020	Standing at the Gate: Remix Collection
"Door" (Oklou Remix)	2020	Standing at the Gate: Remix Collection
"Some Small Hope" (with Lauren Auder)	2020	Non-album promotional single

=== As featured artist ===
List of singles as featured artist, with selected peak chart positions
Title	Year	Peak chart positions					Album
Title	Year	US Bub.	US Dance	US World Dig.	IRE	NZ Hot	Album
"Ashes of Love" (Danny L Harle featuring Caroline Polachek)	2016	—	―	―	―	―	Non-album single
"Marzipan" (Felicita featuring Caroline Polachek)	2018	—	―	―	―	―	Hej!
"La vita nuova" (Christine and the Queens featuring Caroline Polachek)	2020	—	―	20	―	―	La vita nuova
"New Shapes" (Charli XCX featuring Christine and the Queens and Caroline Polachek)	2021	—	―	—	90	36	Crash
"Awful Things" (Murkage Dave featuring Caroline Polachek)	2021	—	―	—	―	―	The City Needs a Hero
"Sirens" (Flume featuring Caroline Polachek)	2022	—	24	―	―	27	Palaces
"Spalarkle (Alys)" (Felicita featuring Caroline Polachek)	2023	—	—	―	―	—	Spalarkle
"Industrial Love Song" (These New Puritans featuring Caroline Polachek)	2025	—	—	―	―	—	Crooked Wing
"Tell Me I Never Knew That" (Caroline featuring Caroline Polachek)	2025	—	—	―	―	—	Caroline 2
"Everything Is Romantic" (Charli XCX featuring Caroline Polachek)	2025	25	—	―	42	10	Brat and It's Completely Different but Also Still Brat
"Azimuth" (Danny L Harle featuring Caroline Polachek)	2026	—	—	―	―	—	Cerulean
"On & On" (Danny L Harle featuring Caroline Polachek)	2026	—	—	―	―	—	Cerulean
"—" denotes items which were not released in that country or failed to chart.

== Guest appearances ==
List of guest appearances by Caroline Polachek
Title	Year	Artist(s)	Album
"Big Bills"	2009	Flosstradamus	Non-album single
"L'Homme"	2009	Boy Crisis	Tulipomania
"I Know, I Hear" (featuring Caroline Polachek)	2010	Holy Ghost!	Static on the Wire EP
"Sparrow Song"	2010	Acrylics	Lives and Treasure EP
"Trophy Queen"	2010	Guards	Guards EP
"You and I"	2011	Washed Out	Within and Without
"Chamakay"	2013	Blood Orange	Cupid Deluxe
"Chosen"	2013	Blood Orange	Cupid Deluxe
"Unhold"	2013	Delorean	Apar
"In the Crew of Tea Time"	2013	Sébastien Tellier	Non-album single
"Everything is Spoilt by Use"	2013	Ice Choir	Afar
"I.V. Aided Dreams"	2013	Jorge Elbrecht	Gloss Coma 001
"Full Mental Erase"	2013	Jorge Elbrecht	Gloss Coma 001
"Look Away"	2014	SBTRKT	Wonder Where We Land
"Togetherness"	2017	Fischerspooner	SIR
"Tears"	2017	Charli XCX	Pop 2
"Delicious"	2017	Charli XCX	Pop 2
"Coughing Up Amber"	2018	Felicita	Hej!
"Soft Power II"	2018	Felicita	Hej!
"Elena Again"	2018	Felicita	Hej!
"Mosaic Genetics"	2018	Felicita	Hej!
"X-Ray"	2018	Tommy Cash	¥€$
"Do You Think About Us?"	2018	The Night Game	The Night Game
"Chandelier"	2020	A. G. Cook	7G
"Idyll"	2020	A. G. Cook	7G
"Alright"	2020	A. G. Cook	7G
"The Darkness"	2020	A. G. Cook	Apple
"Lifeline"	2020	A. G. Cook	Apple
"Long Road Home"	2020	Oneohtrix Point Never	Magic Oneohtrix Point Never
"No Nightmares"	2020	Oneohtrix Point Never	Magic Oneohtrix Point Never
"So Cold You're Hurting My Feelings"	2020	None	Pop Caroler's Songbook
"Ocean's Theme"	2021	Danny L Harle	Harlecore
"For So Long"	2021	Danny L Harle	Harlecore
"Heaven Fell (Reprise)"	2021	Sega Bodega	Salvador
Spree (credited as CEP)	2022	None	Sunflowers Vol. I
"Bang Bang"	2022	None	Minions: The Rise of Gru (Original Motion Picture Soundtrack)
"Trust"	2022	Hyd	Clearing
"Glass"	2022	Hyd	Clearing
"Immortal"	2023	Thy Slaughter	Soft Rock
"Equine"	2024	A. G. Cook	Britpop
"Everything Is Romantic"	2024	Charli XCX	Brat and It's Completely Different but Also Still Brat
"Marzipan (Hotel Forum)"	2024	Felicita	Spælarkle
"Love Triangle"	2026	Angèle, Sebastian	Instinct

== Remixes ==
List of remixes by Caroline Polachek
Title	Year	Artist(s)
"Simmer"	2020	Hayley Williams
"Oh Yeah"	2021	A. G. Cook

== Songwriting and production credits ==
List of Caroline Polachek's songwriting and production credits
Title	Year	Artist(s)	Album	Credits	Written with	Produced with
"No Angel"	2013	Beyoncé	Beyoncé	Co-writer/producer	Beyoncé Knowles-Carter, James Fauntleroy	Beyoncé
"SDP Interlude"	2016	Travis Scott	Birds in the Trap Sing McKnight	Co-writer	Jacques Webster, Cassie Ventura, Ricci Riera, Ernest Greene	–
"Worth It (Perfect)"	2017	Superfruit	Future Friends	Co-writer	Mitch Grassi, Danny L Harle, Scott Hoying, Jakob Bjorn-Hansen	–
"Deny U"	2017	Superfruit	Future Friends	Co-writer	Mitch Grassi, Scott Hoying, Jussi Ilmari Karvinen	–
"Keep Me Coming"	2017	Superfruit	Future Friends	Co-writer	Mitch Grassi, Scott Hoying, Danny L Harle	–
"Tangerine" (featuring Rachel Goswell)	2017	Beach Fossils	Somersault	Co-writer	Dustin Payseur, Jack Smith, Tommy Davidson	–
"Togetherness" (featuring Caroline Polachek)	2017	Fischerspooner	SIR	Featured artist/co-writer	Warren Fischer, Casey Spooner, Jonathan "Michael" Stipe, Michael Cheever	–
"Our Music" (featuring Kelela)	2017	Solange	#MYCALVINS	Co-writer/Producer	Solange Knowles, Devonte Hynes, Kelela Mizanekristos	Blood Orange, Kindness
"Tears" (featuring Caroline Polachek)	2017	Charli XCX	Pop 2	Featured artist/co-writer	Charlotte Aitchison, Alex Cook	–
"Stranger Strange"	2018	Fischerspooner	SIR	Co-writer	Warren Fischer, Casey Spooner, Jonathan "Michael" Stipe, Andy LeMaster	–
"Discreet"	2018	Fischerspooner	SIR	Co-writer	Warren Fischer, Casey Spooner, Jonathan "Michael" Stipe, Michael Cheever, Thomas Haskett	–
"Marzipan" (featuring Caroline Polachek)	2018	Felicita	Hej!	Featured artist/co-writer	Dominik Dvorak	–
"X-Ray"	2018	Tommy Cash	¥€$	Additional vocals/co-writer	Tomas Tammemets, Danny L Harle	–
"RIP Harambe"	2019	Yung Jake	-	Co-writer		BloodPop
"Idyll"	2020	A. G. Cook	7G	Additional producer	–	A. G. Cook
"No More Shubz"	2020	Klein	–	Co-writer/producer	Klein	Klein
"Ocean's Theme"	2021	Danny L Harle	Harlecore	Vocals/co-writer	Danny L Harle	–
"For So Long"	2021	Danny L Harle	Harlecore	Vocals/co-writer	Danny L Harle	–
"No Shadow"	2021	Hyd	Hyd EP	Co-writer	Hayden Dunham, Alexander Guy Cook, Nicolas Petitfrère	–
"Skin 2 Skin"	2021	Hyd	Hyd EP	Co-writer/co-producer	Hayden Dunham, Alexander Guy Cook	A. G. Cook
"Petals"	2021	Pentatonix	The Lucky Ones	Co-writer	Scott Hoying, Mitch Grassi, Justin Karvinen	–
"Trust"	2022	Hyd	Clearing	Additional vocals/co-writer	Hayden Dunham, Sophie Xeon, Alexander Guy Cook	–
"Afar"	2022	Hyd	Clearing	Co-writer/producer	Hayden Dunham	–
"Immortal"	2023	Thy Slaughter	Soft Rock	Vocals/co-writer	Alexander Guy Cook, Finn Keane	–

== Music videos ==
List of music videos, showing year released and director name
Title	Year	Director
"Arcadia"	2014	Caroline Polachek & Ross Menuez
"Dominic"	2014	Caroline Polachek
"I Love Our World"	2015	Caroline Polachek
"Ashes of Love" (Danny L Harle featuring Caroline Polachek)	2016	Sam Rolfe
"Marzipan" (Felicita featuring Caroline Polachek)	2017	Matt Copson
"Door"	2019	Caroline Polachek & Matt Copson
"Ocean of Tears"	2019	Caroline Polachek & Matt Copson
"So Hot You're Hurting My Feelings"	2019	Caroline Polachek & Matt Copson
"The Gate" (Extended Mix)	2020	Ezra Miller
"Bunny Is a Rider"	2021	Caroline Polachek & Matt Copson
"New Shapes" (Charli XCX featuring Christine and the Queens and Caroline Polachek)	2021	Imogene Strauss, Luke Orlando & Terrence O'Connor
"Billions"	2022	Caroline Polachek & Matt Copson
"Sunset"	2022	Caroline Polachek & Matt Copson
"Welcome to My Island"	2022	Caroline Polachek & Matt Copson
"Smoke"	2023	Caroline Polachek & Matt Copson

Other appearances

Title	Artist	Year	Director(s)
"Time to Pretend"	MGMT	2008	Ray Tintori
