= HEJ =

HEJ or Hej may refer to:

- Hej, village in Sweden
- Hej!, 2018 studio album by Felicita
- H.E.J. Research Institute of Chemistry (Hussain Ebrahim Jamal), Pakistani research institute
- HEJ, ICAO airline code for Hellas Jet, Greece
- HEJ, division code for Hejiang County, China
- Haute École de Joaillerie, school of Feng J, Chinese designer
