= Squirrel Flower =

American musician (born 1996)

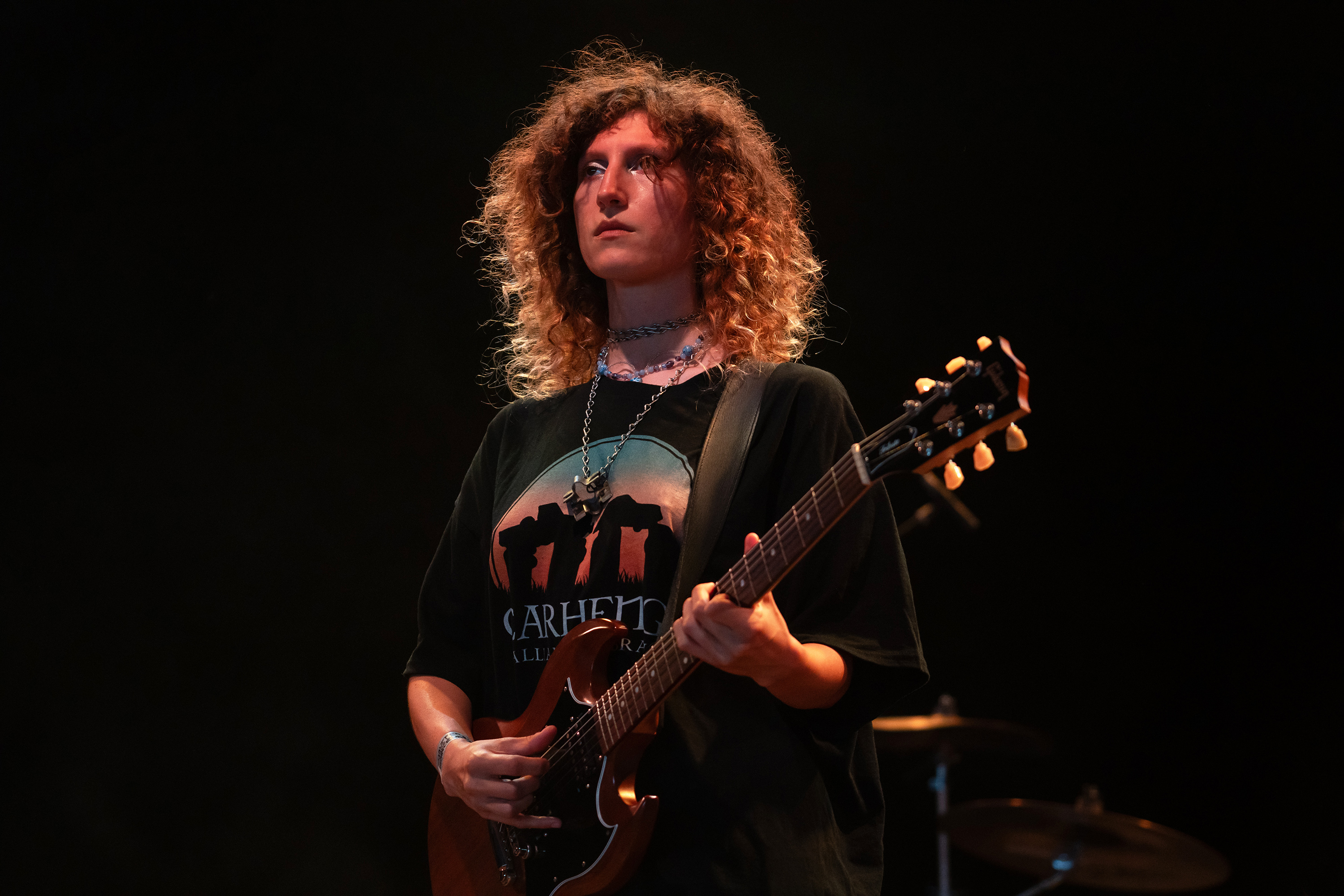
- Squirrel Flower, 2024.

Background information
- Born: Ella O'Connor Williams; August 11, 1996 (age 30)
- Origin: Boston, Massachusetts
- Genre: Indie folk
- Instruments: Vocals, guitar, piano, bass
- Years active: 2015–present
- Labels: Polyvinyl Records, 2000 Pigs Records, It Takes Time Records
- Website: www.squirrelflower.net

Squirrel Flower (born August 11, 1996) is the stage name of American musician Ella O'Connor Williams.

== Early life ==
Williams grew up in Arlington, Massachusetts. When Williams was a child, she gave herself the nickname Squirrel Flower. In 2014, she moved to Iowa to attend Grinnell College. She graduated from Grinnell in 2018, earning a bachelor's degree with a dual major in studio art and gender, women’s and sexuality studies.

== History ==
After getting involved in the DIY scene in Boston as a teenager, Williams moved to Iowa. There, she wrote her first EP as Squirrel Flower and began setting up small tours for herself. This first EP, titled Early Winter Songs From Middle America, was self-released in 2015.

In 2016, Williams released her second EP titled Contact Sports on a St. Louis-based DIY tape label called It Takes Time.

Williams' debut album, I Was Born Swimming, was released in 2020 via Polyvinyl Records. The album was produced by Gabe Wax. This anticipated label debut earned overwhelming praise from the likes of Gorilla vs. Bear, NPR Music, and Paste, and she was named Rolling Stone Artist You Need To Know, Stereogum's Artist to Watch, The FADER's Gen F, and The Guardian's One to Watch. In May 2020, Squirrel Flower released the single "Take It Or Leave It", backed with her cover of Caroline Polachek's "So Hot You’re Hurting My Feelings."

In March 2024, Williams was the first artist to withdraw from the South by Southwest festival due to sponsorships by "defense department contractors [that] make the weapons that the IDF uses to bomb Gaza." Eighty artists followed her lead, causing the festival to terminate their contracts with US Army and RTX Corporation for the 2025 festival. Also in March 2024, she was featured on NPR Tiny Desk for the first time.

On June 16, 2026, Williams released "Reelin" as the lead single to her album Say a Prayer to the Gods of Getting Going. The album is scheduled to release on August 21, 2026 with a North American tour in support of the album.

== Stage name ==
The name I came up with when I was a kid. It's sort of like me borrowing this alter ego from my childhood to use as a moniker; I was trying to decide if I wanted a band name, if I wanted to use my own name, because when I first came up with Squirrel Flower as a musical moniker, I had been making music for a while under my own name, but I wanted to do something a little different. I was brainstorming and feeling kind of stuck, because band names are really hard to come up with (laughs). There are a lot of really bad band names out there, and there are a lot of not so bad band names out there. But it was interesting: I could use this alter ego that I had as a child when I first started engaging with my own creative practice and my own art, and it just stuck.

== Discography ==
Studio albums

- Contact Sports (Deluxe Edition) (2018, 2000 Pigs)
- I Was Born Swimming (2020, Polyvinyl)
- Planet (i) (2021, Polyvinyl)
- Tomorrow's Fire (2023, Polyvinyl)
- Say a Prayer to the Gods of Getting Going (2026, Polyvinyl)

EPs

- Early Winter Songs from Middle America (2015, self-released)
- Contact Sports (2016, It Takes Time. Re-released on vinyl in 2018 by 2000 Pigs)
- Planet (2022, Full Time Hobby)

Singles

- "Midwestern Clay" (2016)
- "Not Your Prey" (2016)
- "Red Shoulder" (2019)
- "Headlights" (2019)
- "Streetlight Blues" (2020)
- "Take It or Leave It / So Hot You’re Hurting My Feelings" (2020)
- "Explain It to Me / Chicago" (2020)
- "Hurt a Fly" (2021)
- "I'll Go Running" (2021)
- ”Flames and Flat Tires” (2021)
