= Tomorrow's Fire =

Studio album by Squirrel Flower
- Released: October 13, 2023
- Studio: Drop of Sun Studios, Asheville, North Carolina, US
- Genre: Indie rock
- Length: 34:17
- Language: English
- Label: Polyvinyl Record Co.
- Producer: Alex Farrar; Ella Williams

Squirrel Flower chronology
Planet (2022)	Tomorrow's Fire (2023)

Tomorrow's Fire is the fourth full-length studio album from American indie rock musician Squirrel Flower, born Ella Williams. The album was released on October 13, 2023 and has received positive reviews from critics.

== Reception ==
Editors at AnyDecentMusic? aggregated eight reviews and scored this release a 7.7 out of 10. According to the review aggregator Metacritic, Tomorrow's Fire received "universal acclaim" based on a weighted average score of 81 out of 100 from eight critic scores. Editors at AllMusic rated this album 4 out of 5 stars, with critic Timothy Monger writing that "the album's feeling of overcast turbulence dovetails neatly with the sweet, yawning melodies that are one of [Squirrel Flower]'s trademarks". In Exclaim!, Jordan Currie gave this album 8 out of 10 for having music that "feels like a tangible, lived-in location of its own". Alexa Viscius of Glide Magazine praised Squirrel Flower's "ability to write such stunning sentiments and deliver them with just the right emotions is a clinic on the use of tone and allows her music to come off as a dark yet unforgettable novella". Paste's Eric Bennett rated this release an 8.8 out of 10, calling it the best Squirrel Flower album to date, highlighting the emotional depth of the lyrics with "songs [that] are an exercise in relief, the sonic equivalent of those rooms where you pay to smash chairs or whip a vase at the wall", as well as lighter themes. Writing for Pitchfork, Marissa Lorusso scored this album a 7.4 out of 10, characterizing it as "a compact, muscular record guided by a single-minded intensity". Editors of Rolling Stone chose Tomorrow's Fire as a "Hear This" pick, with critic Leah Lu calling it the act's best album yet and "most outwardly rocking record".

Editors at Paste chose this for the 45th best album of 2023 and rated it one of the 30 best rock albums of the year. Critics at Rolling Stone included this among the 40 best indie rock albums of 2023. At Under the Radar, this was rated the 54th best album of 2023. Editors at AllMusic included this among their favorite singer-songwriter music albums of 2023.

== Track listing ==
1. "i don’t use a trash can" – 2:57
2. "Full Time Job" – 1:57
3. "Alley Light" – 3:14
4. "Almost Pulled Away" – 4:17
5. "Stick" – 3:02
6. "When a Plant Is Dying" – 4:26
7. "Intheskatepark" – 2:25
8. "Canyon" – 3:42
9. "What Kind of Dream Is This?" – 4:04
10. "Finally Rain" – 4:08

== Personnel ==
- Squirrel Flower – guitar, keyboards, vocals

"Full Time Job"

- Squirrel Flower – guitar, bass guitar, vocals
- Alex Farrar – drums, guitar, keyboards, noises
- Jake Lenderman – guitar

"Alley Light"

- Squirrel Flower – guitar, vocals
- Alex Farrar – guitar, drums
- Dave Hartley – bass guitar
- Matt McCaughan – percussion

"Almost Pulled Away"

- Squirrel Flower – guitar, vocals
- Alex Farrar – drums
- Dave Hartley – bass guitar

"Stick"

- Squirrel Flower – guitar, bass guitar, vocals
- Alex Farrar – drums, keyboards
- Matt McCaughan – percussion

"When a Plant Is Dying"

- Squirrel Flower – guitar, vocals
- Dave Hartley – bass guitar
- Seth Kaufman – guitar
- Jake Lenderman – guitar
- Matt McCaughan – drums

"Intheskatepark"

- Squirrel Flower – guitar, keyboards, vocals
- Alex Farrar – bass guitar, keyboards

"Canyon"

- Squirrel Flower – guitar, vocals
- Alex Farrar – keyboards
- Dave Hartley – bass guitar
- Matt McCaughan – drums, percussion
- Nate Williams – metalworking field recordings

"What Kind of Dream Is This"

- Squirrel Flower – guitar, vocals
- Alex Farrar – keyboards
- Matt McCaughan – percussion

"Finally Rain"

- Squirrel Flower – guitar, vocals
- Ethan Baechtold – piano
- Alex Farrar – guitar, keyboards
- Dave Hartley – bass guitar
- Matt McCaughan – drums

Technical personnel

- Lawson Anderson – engineering assistance
- Charlie Boss – photography
- Em Marie Davenport – painting
- Alex Farrar – engineering, mixing, production
- Yasmine Sayre – layout design
- Ella Williams – production

== See also ==
- 2023 in American music
- List of 2023 albums
