= Drawing the Target Around the Arrow =

Studio album by CEP
- Released: January 19, 2017
- Recorded: 2012–2016
- Genre: Minimal; instrumental; ambient
- Length: 60:41
- Label: Pannonica
- Producer: Caroline Polachek

CEP chronology
Arcadia (2014)	Drawing the Target Around the Arrow (2017)	Pang (2019)

Drawing the Target Around the Arrow is the second studio album by American singer-songwriter and producer Caroline Polachek.

It is Polachek's first release since the breakup of her band Chairlift just one month prior. The project was released on January 19, 2017 by Pannonica, (an imprint of Bella Union), as a surprise album. The album was announced by a tweet on January 18, and the album was released as a free download the next day. The album was promoted with a concert at National Sawdust with a twelve-person vocal choir. The album is credited to Polachek's initials, CEP.

== Composition ==
Drawing the Target Around the Arrow differs from Polachek's earlier work in that it consists solely of minimal instrumental tracks. Polachek crafted the album using raw sine waves, as she had been growing bored of how "genre-specific" music had become and wanted to strip it down to its basic parts. She was also drawn to the idea of creating "useful" music to wake up or do work to. The album's title comes from 18th century Jewish Lithuanian preacher Dubno maggid, in explaining how he comes up with his fables. As Polachek summarized, "It's about honoring your impulses and working with what you have in front of you."

== Critical reception ==
Professional ratings
Review scores
Source	Rating
Pitchfork	7.0/10

Thea Ballard of Pitchfork called the composition "generally unobtrusive, and the individual tracks often run together" and that "perhaps the most satisfying aspect of this release is its definitively non-linguistic form of expression".

== Track listing ==
All tracks are written by Caroline Polachek.

Drawing the Target Around the Arrow track listing
No.	Title	Length
1.	"Lilian's Pavilion"	2:57
2.	"Doves"	1:37
3.	"Hive Dream"	2:05
4.	"Borg Pillow"	5:36
5.	"Low Tide"	3:52
6.	"Water"	1:53
7.	"Up the Flagpole"	4:07
8.	"Missed Exit"	2:14
9.	"Black Background"	2:27
10.	"Vertical Sunset"	2:22
11.	"Valley Hum"	4:24
12.	"Singalong"	5:12
13.	"It Can Wait"	3:19
14.	"Pupil"	5:32
15.	"Window Seat"	3:23
16.	"Sleeping Fish"	2:52
17.	"Verge of Crying"	2:24
18.	"You Are Here"	3:36
Total length:		60:41

== Personnel ==
Credits adapted from the album's liner notes.

- Caroline Polachek – production, mixing
- Heba Kadry – mastering
- Tim Barber – photography
