= So Hot You're Hurting My Feelings =

Single by Caroline Polachek

from the album Pang
- Released: September 16, 2019
- Genre: Indie pop; new wave; synth-pop
- Length: 3:03
- Label: Columbia
- Songwriters: Caroline Polachek; Teddy Geiger; Daniel Nigro
- Producers: Polachek; Nigro

Caroline Polachek singles chronology
"Parachute" (2019)	"So Hot You're Hurting My Feelings" (2019)	"Look at Me Now" (2019)

Music video
- "So Hot You're Hurting My Feelings" on YouTube

"So Hot You're Hurting My Feelings" is a song by American singer-songwriter and producer Caroline Polachek from her third studio album (and first under her own name) Pang (2019). The song was released on September 16, 2019, and has been described as an indie pop, new wave, and synth-pop track. While it did not chart at the time of its release, the song became a sleeper hit after it went viral on TikTok in early 2022.

== Release and promotion ==
An official music video was released on October 2, 2019. On December 18, 2019, an official remix by A. G. Cook of PC Music was released as the lead single from her remix album Standing at the Gate: Remix Collection (2021). On January 30, 2020, Polachek performed the song on Jimmy Kimmel Live!, marking her first solo live television appearance.

A Christmas-themed rework of the song called "So Cold You're Hurting My Feelings" was released in December 2020 as part of the PC Music Pop Carol holiday concert.

== Critical reception ==
Robin Bacior of Consequence of Sound described "So Hot You're Hurting My Feelings" as a song with "a little more pep in its step" than her other singles, "Parachute" and "Ocean of Tears". Luke Holland of The Guardian reviewed the song with "I definitely am saying you’re a bad person if you hate this". Amanda Gersten of Paste called the song "bouncy, bright and wouldn’t sound too out of place on a Chairlift album".

American singer Lady Gaga included the song on her "Women of Choice" curated playlist.

== Cover versions ==
Indie rock artist Waxahatchee performed a live acoustic cover of "So Hot You're Hurting My Feelings" at SiriusXM's Los Angeles Studios on April 2, 2020. Indie folk musician Squirrel Flower released her own cover of the song as a single on May 5, 2020. The song was also covered by Black Country, New Road for the vinyl only EP Never Again Part 2. English indie rock band Blossoms covered the song in 2024, on the deluxe edition of their album Gary, the second disc of which featured 8 cover songs.

== Track listing ==
A. G. Cook Remix – single

- "So Hot You're Hurting My Feelings" (A. G. Cook Remix) – 3:35

== Charts ==
Chart performance for "So Hot You're Hurting My Feelings"
Chart (2022)	Peak position
US Hot Rock & Alternative Songs (Billboard)	27

== Certifications ==
Region	Certification	Certified units/sales
United States (RIAA)	Gold	500,000^{‡}
^{‡} Sales+streaming figures based on certification alone.
