= Ocean of Tears (song) =

Single by Caroline Polachek

from the album Pang
- Released: 24 July 2019
- Genre: Avant-R&B
- Length: 3:25
- Label: Columbia
- Songwriters: Caroline Polachek; Nathaniel Campany; Kyle Shearer
- Producers: Danny L Harle; Polachek; Valley Girl

Caroline Polachek singles chronology
"Door" (2019)	"Ocean of Tears" (2019)	"Parachute" (2019)

Music video
- "Ocean of Tears" on YouTube

"Ocean of Tears" is a song by American singer-songwriter and producer Caroline Polachek from her third studio album Pang. It was released as the second single from the album on July 24, 2019, the same day as "Parachute."

== Background and composition ==
"Ocean of Tears" is "dedicated to the sharp pain of being in love with someone far away, and the maddening doubt that comes with it." It was the last song written for the album.

The song is a hip hop-tinged "trembling, operatic ballad in the vein of Björk or Zola Jesus, rendered in the rich electro-organic palette Polachek tends to prefer." The song features "bold production choices like a series of violent but satisfying bass hits near the end of the song" and "adventurous" vocals.

== Music video ==
The song's music video was described as "ornate, romantic, lush, and delightfully surreal" and compared to Enya's "Orinoco Flow". The song's pirate-themed music video originated from a trip to Disneyland with co-director Matt Copson. The nautical themes would go on to inspire other art for the project, including the cover art for Pang.

== Track listing ==
Ocean of Tears – Single

- "Ocean of Tears" – 3:24

Ocean of Tears (umru Remix) – Single

- "Ocean of Tears" (umru Remix) – 3:05
- "Ocean of Tears" – 3:24
