= Door (song) =

Single by Caroline Polachek

from the album Pang
- Released: 19 June 2019
- Genre: Pop
- Length: 5:22
- Label: Columbia
- Songwriters: Caroline Polachek; Daniel Nigro; Jim-E Stack; Danny L Harle
- Producers: Jim-E Stack; Nigro; Polachek

Caroline Polachek singles chronology
"Dominic" (2014)	"Door" (2019)	"Ocean of Tears" (2019)

Music video
- "Door" on YouTube

"Door" is a song by American singer-songwriter and producer Caroline Polachek from her third studio and major-label debut album Pang. It was released as the lead single from the album on June 19, 2019. The song is the first release by Polachek under her own name, having previously released music under "Ramona Lisa", "CEP", and as part of the band "Chairlift". The song was written and produced by Polachek, Dan Nigro and Jim-E Stack and Danny L Harle (the latter being a co-producer). "Door" was released alongside a psychedelic-inspired music video.

== Background ==
In an interview with Vogue, Polachek expressed her surprise that her label was happy to lead with "Door" as the first single, explaining "it's such a long and winding song. There are songs on the record that are a bit more twisty and moody. And this one feels like, no pun intended, an open door. It feels like an invitation."

Polachek said that "Door" was the most difficult track on the album to create, saying "I almost gave up on 'Door' so many times. I couldn't crack it. It started out as a simple song with just a chorus-verse-chorus. I felt like it needed to transform more. I'd written the structure with Dan Nigro, but I wanted to combine it with the world that 'Parachute' and 'Hey Big Eyes' exist in. It's more dreamscape. Making the production work was so difficult, the original vibe sat more on an indie rock palette. I was trying so hard to push it into something that felt more magical, and it felt like it was switching palettes too much, or the dynamic was too jumpy, or it didn't have a solid enough core. The production of that song took about a year from start to finish."

== Critical reception ==
Pitchfork listed the song at number 47 for the 100 best songs of 2019. DIY called the song "a pop journey, complete with acoustic guitar, plenty of synths and a whole lot of bass, not to mention a wordless vocal solo that lasts for a whole minute."

== Track listing ==
Door – Single

- "Door" – 5:22

Door (Oklou Remix) – Single

- "Door" (Oklou Remix) – 3:21
- "Door" – 5:22
