= No Angel (Beyoncé song) =

Song performed by Beyoncé

Song by Beyoncé

from the album Beyoncé
- Released: December 13, 2013
- Recorded: 2012
- Studio: Russel's of Clapton (London); Fetalmus; Jungle City; Oven (New York City)
- Genre: Chillwave
- Length: 3:48
- Label: Parkwood; Columbia
- Songwriters: Caroline Polachek; James Fauntleroy; Beyoncé Knowles
- Producers: Caroline Polachek; Beyoncé Knowles

Music video
- "No Angel" on YouTube

"No Angel" (stylized as "~~Angel~~") is a song by American singer Beyoncé from her fifth studio album, Beyoncé (2013). It was written by James Fauntleroy, Caroline Polachek, and Beyoncé while the latter two and Boots also served as its producers. Polachek worked on several songs for the singer's album with her bandmate from Chairlift, Patrick Wimberly, before "No Angel" was included on the record.

A chillwave midtempo song with elements of R&B, hip hop and trap music, "No Angel" features a minimalistic production and instrumentation consisting mostly of bass. Beyoncé uses a high vocal register, singing in falsetto with breathy vocals. Lyrically, the song features the protagonist declaring that neither she nor her love interest are perfect. "No Angel" received generally favorable reviews from contemporary music critics who praised its composition and the singer's vocal performance; however some of them criticized its placement on the album.

A music video for the song was directed by @lilinternet and filmed in Houston, Texas as a tribute to the singer's hometown. It features various landscape shots of the city as well as close-ups of numerous people, including ten Houston-based rappers; Beyoncé also appears, dressed in white outside a dilapidated house in Melbourne, Australia. The clip received positive reviews from critics who praised the fact that it accurately captured Houston. At the 2014 MTV Video Music Awards, Beyoncé performed "No Angel" live during a medley of songs from her fifth studio album.

== Background ==
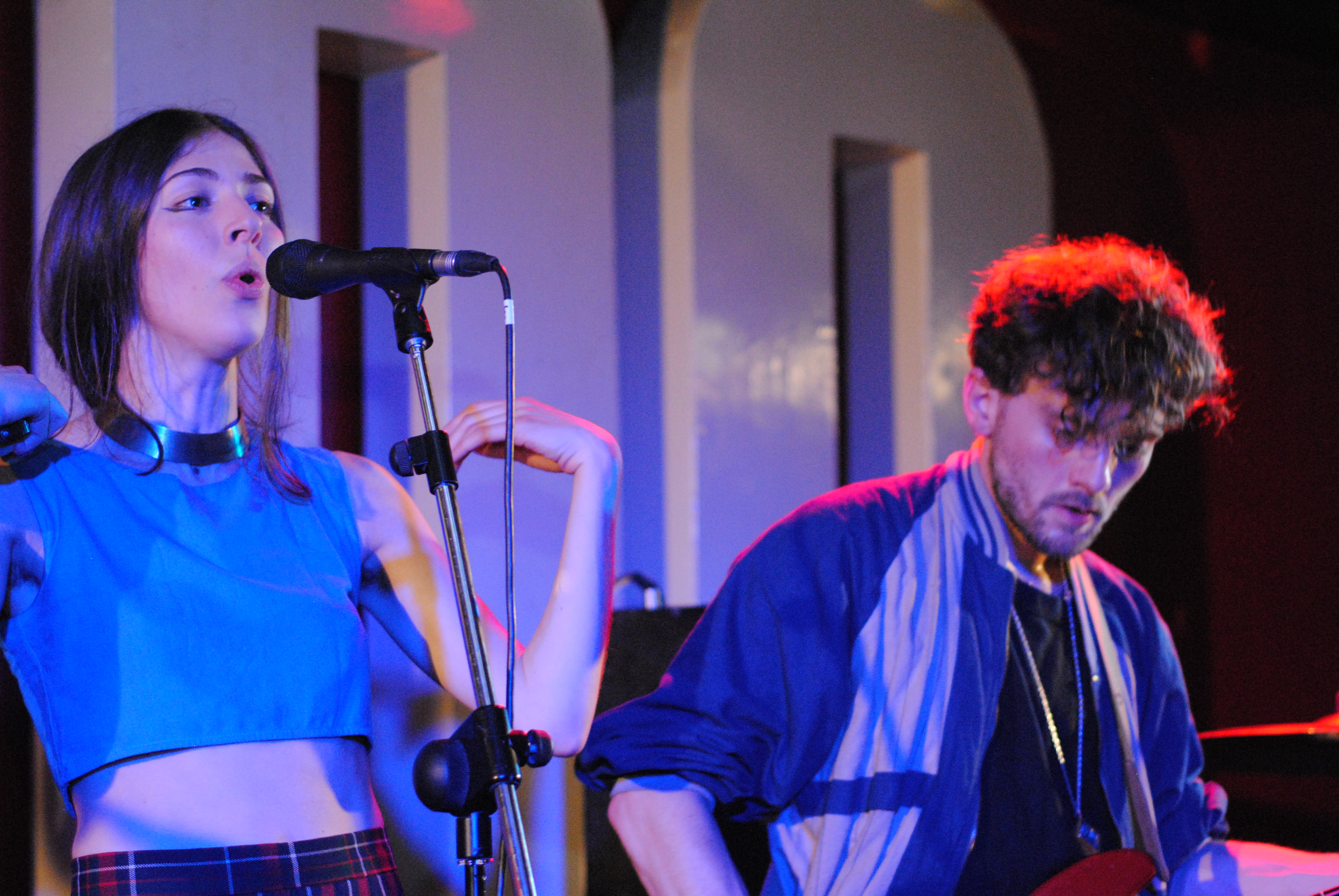
Caroline Polachek (left) and Patrick Wimberly (right) of the band Chairlift worked with Beyoncé on her fifth studio album. "No Angel" written by Polachek was included on Beyoncé.

Beyoncé met with Polachek's bandmate of Chairlift, Patrick Wimberly, who collaborated with her sister Solange Knowles at that time and went with her on tour. During the tour, Beyoncé expressed her admiration of Wimberly, adding that she would "love to get in the studio some time". Wimberly later contacted Beyoncé's management, and Polachek and himself were later invited to a studio in Manhattan to work on Beyoncé's self-titled fifth studio album. They stayed in the studio for a week and when the duo was asked to submit the tracks to Beyoncé's team, Polachek added one song with complete production and a missing verse she had written while being on tour in the United Kingdom and learning how to use Ableton Live. At that time, she felt that the song "could be a good album track for Chairlift, but it would be incredibly sexy if Beyoncé did it".

Regarding the song structure, Polachek stated: "I rewrote the verse lyrics and sent it to her. It had this minute-and-a-half-long instrumental in the middle of it, and I was like 'I'm sure they're gonna cut that out, and replace it with something else. There's no way she's gonna let a minute and a half long instrumental fly.' They kept it. [...] She took this rap that James Fauntleroy wrote for another song, and put it right in the middle of the song. And then reprised the verse from earlier in the song, and then brought the chorus earlier. She reshaped all of these pieces from other places to keep this instrumental intact. And used that production exactly as I gave it. She didn't remove anything." Polachek further elaborated about the differences between her version of "No Angel" and Beyoncé's rendition, saying, "Her groove was different—my vocals were jumpier, and hers were more like panting. And in my version the synths detuned really quickly for a second; she did the same thing but with her voice. It sounds like the whole song melts." Polachek also revealed that she sent Beyoncé a note via Beyonce's A&R about how to perform the song, recommending her to drop down the octave in the first chorus and the second verse before shooting back up the octave in the second chorus; Beyoncé took the note and did the octave jump, breaking her firm "no notes" rule.

"No Angel" was written by James Fauntleroy, Caroline Polachek and Beyoncé and produced by the latter two. Beyoncé handled the track's vocal production. The song was recorded with guidance from Polachek and Stuart White at Russel's of Clapton in London, Fetalmaus Studio, Jungle City Studios and Oven Studios, all in New York City. Polachek also handled the synths and drum programming and Andrew Scheps finished the track's audio mixing. "No Angel" was mastered by Tom Coyne and Aya Merrill at Sterling Sound, New York City.

== Composition ==
"No Angel"
A brief, 22-second sample of the chillwave song "No Angel", in which Beyoncé sings with a falsetto vocal register and says that her partner is by no means perfect.

"No Angel" is a slowtempo chillwave song. Influences of stripped down hip hop music were noted in its beat, with critics also noting elements of midtempo trap and "languid" R&B. The groove was noted to be minimalistic and progressive. Its instrumentation consists of mostly heavy bass, a counterpoint bassline and multiple finger snaps, in addition to chiming and refracted 1980s soft rock synths and percussive thump. Boogie, a distortion musical effect was also implemented in the song. Throughout the song, Beyoncé adopts breathy and emotional vocals. She sings with a falsetto vocal register, with Andrew Hampp and Erika Ramirez of Billboard calling it a return of the falsetto from the singer's own song, "Halo" (2008). Writing for The New York Times, Jody Rosen stated that the singer's vocal performance was an "imitation" of the falsetto by musician Prince. Greg Kot of the Chicago Tribune opined that Beyoncé employed her highest possible range, with her voice "threatening to fray". Complex writer Tim Finney described the singer's vocal performance as an "intoxicating-asthmatic rasp".

Admitting she is not perfect, Beyoncé sings the lines "Would you rather I be a machine who doesn't notice when you late or when you lyin'?" and "No I'm not an angel, but at least I'm trying". In "No Angel", Beyoncé declares that her partner is "no angel either", remarking that he is not perfect. However, despite his imperfections, the protagonist admits she still loves him. Beyoncé sings the lines "[u]nderneath the pretty face is something complicated / I come with a side of trouble / But I know that's why you're staying" in the song aimed to inform her "roguish" male lover. The lines of the chorus are sung by Beyoncé with pronouncing one word at a time in longer intervals. A short interlude about "mov[ing] things to the bedroom" is interpolated in the song. Beyoncé forgoes lyrical subtlety during that part, singing explicit lines such as "Tell me do you wanna ride?" and "First both of my legs go back on your head, and whatever you want, yeah baby, I'm bad". Fuse's Mark Sundstrom interpreted the song's message as talking about the singer's husband Jay-Z and added "She loves him more because she knows him entirely, accepting he's not perfect or without a past". Complex editor Claire Lobenfeld considered its lyrical content to be about how a "couple's respective internal messiness can bring them closer together".

Describing the song as "gorgeous", Anupa Mistry of Spin magazine noted influences by Solange Knowles and added that "she's cool with being pitchy and imperfect". Ludovic Hunter-Tilney from the Financial Times called its sound "indie-R&B of a downtown variety" that Solange Knowles would record. The Verge's Trent Wolbe concluded that "No Angel" was reminiscent of Solange Knowles' work on the extended play True (2012). Bradley Stern from the website MuuMuse called the song one of the album's more "left-leaning productions" saying that it would sound suitable for Solange Knowles' work with Dev Hynes. Philip Shelburne of Spin magazine found a "distinctly Burial-like quality" in the song. Greg Kot of Chicago Tribune noted it was "[a]s discursive as 'Blow' is insistent". Mesfin Fekadu of the Associated Press wrote that the singer "declares she's a freak" in the falsetto-heavy song.

== Critical reception ==
"No Angel" has received generally favorable reviews from most music critics. Writing for BET, Latifah Muhammad deemed "No Angel" "unapologetic and overflowing with the kind of candor that makes it a standout". She further added, "Since love isn't always black and white, this song deals with the gray area". Entertainment Weekly's Nick Catucci felt that the song "treat[s] relationships with the same raw instinct that suffuses her sex songs" on the album. Caitlin White from the website The 405 felt that, "In 'No Angel' her partner is 'no angel either,' the second thought in a comparison that begins with her own ability to transgress standards of purity or celestial perfection". Chris Kelly of Fact noted that the singer managed to put theory to practice with the track, with an "imperfect but touching performance". In a review for The Quietus, Mof Gimmers described "No Angel" as a "pure foreplay".

Writers of Billboard deemed the song a throwback track and praised the singer's falsetto. Ryan B. Patrick of Exclaim! noted that songs on the album, such as "No Angel", effectively display genre diversity, Beyoncé's vocal range and "a penchant of musical experimentation". Tris McCall of The Star-Ledger dubbed the song as one of the "experiments in mood". Michael Cragg of The Guardian opined that the song's "icy mechanics... recasts the slow jam as something otherworldly" and called it a "Pitchfork-friendly" collaboration. Neil McCormick from The Daily Telegraph called the slow track "more groove than an actual song" and praised Beyoncé's vocals "flipping sensuously between breathy falsetto and deep come-on". Jody Rosen from Vulture considered the song a "very pretty showcase" of the singer's falsetto and wrote that its production was "admirably barely there". Complex editor Claire Lobenfeld called "No Angel" part of the darker material on the record and described the singer's vocal performance as "an apparition singing over a lost Bowie-Prince collaboration". Kitty Empire of The Observer noted in her review how "No Angel" was "pretty much as described: a winningly stark baroque'n'B track". Jon Dolan of Rolling Stone described the song as the "[p]rettiest slinky Eighties electro-soul jammy".

Cosmopolitan journalist Alex Rees noted how it was normal for the singer to sound "breathy" and "breathless" following four songs in a row on the album discussing sex. Nicole James of Fuse called the song a "sexed-up midtempo banger". Jem Aswad of the same publication noted the presence of a "wild, jazzy, Joni-ish melody that flies all over the scale". Jordan Runtagh from the website VH1 called "No Angel" a "classic fake-out love song" and connected to the singer's real-life relationship with husband Jay-Z. A more mixed review came from Ryan E.C. Hamm from Under the Radar who noted that the experimentalistic songs on Beyoncé which do not work well, managed to look better only because of the record itself; he exemplified this with "No Angel", criticizing it as "a little boring". Both Christopher R. Weingarten of Spin and Tom Breihan of Stereogum called the song "boring"; the latter added it would be that way for listeners "until that subtle digital bassline finds its way into your head". Breihan, however, praised the singer's falsetto vocals as "a thing to behold". Melissa Locker of Time magazine stated that the singer sang "slightly obnoxiously" in "No Angel". Una Mullally from The Irish Times questioned how "No Angel" was included in the track listing of Beyoncé, before adding "but it did and we're just going to have to deal with it". However, she concluded that the song should be listened several more times to be understood.

== Music video ==
=== Background ===
A music video for "No Angel" was released on December 13, 2013 through the iTunes Store in addition to a clip for every other track on the parent album. On November 24, 2014 it was also uploaded to the singer's Vevo account. @lilinternet served as the director and Ed Burke was the creative director for the visual filmed in Houston, Texas. After seeing the music video for "Express Yourself" by Diplo which was directed by @lilinternet and featured various shots of New Orleans, Beyoncé expressed her wish to collaborate with him on the visual for "No Angel". Diplo contacted the director, telling him that the singer was interested in a collaboration. Following discussions with Beyoncé's team, he went to Houston with Ben Solomon and visited her team from Parkwood Entertainment to discuss about his work. In an interview with Vice magazine, @lilinternet recalled that the whole project occurred "very rapidly". Beyoncé told the director she wanted to create a tribute to Houston, as he specialized in working on filming various locations and "environmental beauty". Initially, the video was planned to be shot in a span of eight days. Only little narratives were planned; however @lilinternet revealed that the team opted for driving around Houston and filming various locations and people. He stated, "We had so many Houston legends all together in that video, and they all really worked hard to let us capture Houston properly. Beyonce's team hooked us up with the legends. It's her hometown and she wanted its heroes represented. And I think they really respected the fact we weren't in and out." He added that the video was completed without any "exaggeration" and felt that there was "so much beauty that kind of just innately was in the people and in the city". The director revealed that he had a lot of freedom while working on the video and added,

We really wanted to spend time, immerse ourselves, drive for hours and hours aimlessly with a camera, jumping out and shooting things that caught my eye. We didn't want to go there and just shoot Frenchy's Chicken and call it an "authentic video." There was tons of hanging out, getting the feel, all with cameras ready. We hooked up with our dude Scotty who was a great help, plus Bun B's brother Truck, and Paul Wall. The city was so receptive, so willing to help, so open, and that leant a lot to the fact that we really got to glimpse of the real character of Houston.

=== Filming and synopsis ===
The visual for "No Angel" features cameo appearances by ten rappers of the Houston hip hop scene: Bun B, Kirko Bangz, Willie D, Lil' Keke, Scarface, Slim Thug, Trae tha Truth, Paul Wall, Z-Ro and Johnny Dang. Several of the rappers praised the singer for deciding to shoot the video in Houston and represent the real life of its residents. It shows various places and buildings in Houston including the Third Ward and Fourth Ward communities, the Cuney Homes housing development, MacGregor Park and a strip club called V Live. A mural of DJ Screw is also featured in one scene and Johnny Dang, a jewelry maker also makes a cameo appearance.

The video opens with a fast motion night view of several skyscrapers located in Houston. It transitions to quick looks of various houses and people. Scenes filmed at the SLAB parade, an annual celebration of car culture in Houston were also featured in the clip set in slow motion. Houston residents posing for the camera are featured throughout the video as well as scenes of children playing football. During several scenes, Beyoncé is seen lip-syncing the song wearing a white-hooded fur mink coat and a matching one piece in front of a tumbledown house holding a Boxer on a leash. This scene was filmed in the suburb of Brunswick, during her Melbourne, Australia part of The Mrs. Carter Show World Tour and is the only scene from the music video, to be filmed outside of Houston. During another scene, she is seen wearing a jersey of the Houston Rockets with number 13, by James Harden. Beyoncé also appears at a gas station filling the fuel tank of a car and later goes to the streets in it.

=== Reception ===
Brandon Soderberg of Vice magazine referred to the clip as one of the album's best moments and a "touching, patient trip" through Houston's hip hop subculture. Brandon Soderberg of the same publication noted that the video "captures the communal spirit of regional rap scenes expertly, and a star as big as Beyoncé, who is indeed from Houston, putting on for the incredibly influential, still rather slept-on hip-hop culture of the city helps more than it hurts". Jon Dolan from Rolling Stone described the clip as a "revealingly down-to-earth tour" of the singer's hometown. Similar sentiments were offered by Sydette Harry from the website Salon who referred to the video as a "love letter" to Houston. Rob Markman writing for MTV News wrote in his review that the video gave viewers a glimpse of Houston local culture. Mark Sundstrom from Fuse felt that it made sense, "both sonically and visually" that the video was shot in Houston and noted many "fun" appearances by different hip hop artists. Lindsey Weber from Vulture stated that the clip was concerned with the town only.

Jody Rosen from Rolling Stone described the clip as "glamorously down-at-heel, a bit poverty-porn-y for my taste" with many "moody shots". He described the singer's look as "ghetto fabulous". Kathy Iandoli of Vice also focused on her appearance, saying that she managed to look "relaxed and sexy" with the jersey. Erin Donnely from the website Refinery29 praised the fact that the video was "totally old school". Brent DiCrescenzo of Time Out magazine ranked the "No Angel" video as the fifth best on the album. He found "typically 'gritty' slow-motion shots of dudes showing off their tricked-out whips and tats" and added that the singer "keep[s] it real". Whitney Phaneuf of the website HitFix put it at the position of eleven from the album's seventeen videos, describing it as "old school", adding that its sole focus was Houston's local street culture. Claire Lobenfeld of Complex described the clip as "bold" and "polished". Michael Zelenko of The Fader remarked that Beyoncé "shines in an all-white get-up". Vanity Fair reviewer Michelle Collins noted that the video documented Beyoncé's life in the city while growing up before she became a renowned pop star.

Sharing what he perceived to be "key" moments in each of the seventeen music videos, Walker of MTV identified one for "No Angel" where Beyoncé "proves she comes 'with a side of trouble'". Bradley Stern from MuuMuse remarked how the video looked like the video game Grand Theft Auto and showed things that did not look "angelic": "Between the tough-looking gangbangers, fancy cars and flashy jewelry, strippers and dozens of 'In Loving Memory' tees and tributes, it seems like Bey's trying to say these aren't exactly the easiest streets to live... But like the song suggests, just because things might get rough sometimes doesn't mean it's not still home." A mixed review came from an editor of Houston Chronicle who described the clip as "somber, shocking" and noted the omissions of many landmarks characteristic for the city such as Waterwall, the Houston Astrodome and The Galleria. The editor also noted that the video offered a glimpse in the town's sex industry and elaborated,

Many Houstonians probably don't know that side of the city. They almost certainly don't see it as beautiful. 'Thug culture' is what some pundits call it. But underneath is something complicated, and it has a way of influencing society unlike anything else Houston produces. Because of Beyoncé, that is the Houston that the world sees. It is a Houston that deserves a closer look.

== Live performance and cover version ==
"No Angel" was performed live for the first time by Beyoncé at the 2014 MTV Video Music Awards on August 25, as part of a medley of her self-titled album. She was dressed in a jeweled bodysuit and performed the song as the third on the set, after "Haunted". Nadeska Alexis of MTV News felt that the singer managed to emphasize the lyrics' "weight" while performing the song.

In early August 2014, Brooklyn-based singer Tei Shi released a cover of "No Angel" with a different arrangement from the original version; the song was more upbeat and contained elements of chill music. Shi's cover was produced by herself along with Gianluca Buccellati, with the latter also handling the mixing. Her version received media coverage and was received positively by several critics. Speaking about her decision to record the song, Shi stated that she was motivated by the fact that "No Angel" sounded different from Beyoncé's other songs due to an "edgier, less-pretty vibe". She rehearsed it with a band and performed it live, before deciding to record it in the studio motivated by positive public response.

== Credits and personnel ==
Credits adopted from the album's liner notes and the singer's official website.

Song credits

- Writing – Caroline Polachek, Beyoncé Knowles, James Fauntleroy
- Production – Polachek, Beyoncé
- Vocal production – Beyoncé
- Additional production – Boots
- Recording – Polachek; Russel's of Clapton, London and Fetalmaus Studio, New York City. Stuart White; Jungle City Studios and Oven Studios, New York City.
- Second engineering – Ramon Rivas
- Synths and drum programming – Polachek
- Audio mixing – Andrew Scheps; Punker Pad West, Van Nuys, California
- Additional mixing – Stuart White
- Assistant mix engineering – Justin Hergett
- Mastering – Tom Coyne and Aya Merrill; Sterling Sound, New York City

Video credits

- Featuring – Bun B, Kirko Bangz, Willie D, Lil' Keke, Scarface, Slim Thug, Trae tha Truth, Paul Wall, Z-Ro, Johny Dang
- Director – @lilinternet
- Creative director – Ed Burke
- Directors of photography – Shomi Patwary, Thuan Tran
- Additional photography – Jackson Hunt
- Producers – Ben Solomon, Bill Kirstein, Erinn Williams
- Production company – Karmaloop Media, Parkwood Entertainment
- Stylists – Ty Hunter, Raquel Smith
- Additional styling – Tim White
- Editors – @lilinternet, Jeremiah Shuff
- Brand manager – Melissa Vargas
- Hair – Neal Farinah
- Make-up – Sir John
- Color correction – Rob Sciarratta
- Visual effects – The Brigade
- Photography – Robin Harper

== Certifications ==
Region	Certification	Certified units/sales
United States (RIAA)	Gold	500,000^{‡}
^{‡} Sales+streaming figures based on certification alone.
