= Feng J =

Paris-based Chinese jewelry designer and artist

- 丰吉
- Born: 1985 in Hangzhou
- Education: CAA, UAL, HEJ, GIA
- Occupation: Jewelry artist ＆ designer

Feng J or Feng Ji (simplified Chinese: 丰吉; traditional Chinese: 豐吉; born 1985) is a Paris-based Chinese jewelry designer and artist. She established her own eponymous jewelry brand in Paris and set up showrooms in Place Vendôme and Shanghai. In December 2015, she founded Fengji Jewelry (Shanghai) Co., Ltd. in Shanghai, serving as its executive director and general manager. The company has a registered capital of only RMB 1 million.

Feng brought the "Jardins de Giverny" necklace and the "Fountain of Diamonds" ring to Phillips Auction in November 2020, where the necklace was auctioned for $2.6 million. In May 2021, she attended the "Woman to Woman" exhibition co-hosted by Phillips and jewelry historian Vivienne Becker.

== Education ==
Feng J graduated from the China Academy of Art, where she received tuition from Wang Shu. Feng obtained her Master's Degree in jewellery design from the University of the Arts London. Subsequently, she studied at Haute École de Joaillerie, received training in European-style jewelry craftsmanship, and earned a Graduate Gemologist degree from Gemological Institute of America.

== Career ==
Feng created FENG.J Haute Joaillerie, a jewelry brand, in France in 2016. In 2018, a brooch and earrings by Feng were displayed at the PAD London in the United Kingdom.

In 2019, Feng's jewelry piece was exhibited at Salon Art+Design Fair in New York, United States.
