= Felicita (musician) =

English record producer and DJ (born 1987)

felicita
- Also known as: Dom Dvorak
- Born: 3 April 1987 (age 39)
- Origin: Hounslow, London
- Genres: Electronic
- Occupation: Producer
- Years active: 2010–present
- Labels: PC Music, Gum Artefacts

Dominik Dvorak (born 3 April 1987), known by their stage name Felicita (stylized in all lowercase), is an English record producer and DJ based in London. They came to prominence through early collaborations with Nabihah Iqbal, Palmistry and Sophie. In 2014, they released the Frenemies EP with Gum Artefacts on digital platforms and vinyl.

They have worked with A. G. Cook under the collaborative alias Lipgloss Twins on the PC Music label and in early 2016, they were officially signed to PC Music as a solo act. They released the A New Family EP in October 2016 on the label. Felicita's debut album hej! was released on 3 August 2018.

== Career ==
=== Early years and breakthrough ===
Felicita first received praise from music magazines and blogs in 2013 for the (>'.')># EP and the single "Chlo/Bring It". In 2014, the then-anonymous collaborative project Lipgloss Twins released the single "Wannabe" on PC Music to significant coverage. Later that year Frenemies, their first commercial EP, was released on Gum Artefacts to positive reviews from Pitchfork and Resident Advisor.

=== 2015–2017: Work with PC Music ===
After two self-released singles in 2015 that were promoted by PC Music, a string of live performances at PC Music events and showcases, and another release from Lipgloss Twins, Felicita's signing to the label was announced with the single "heads will roll / i will devour you" in May 2016. The single "a new family" was released with a music video directed by artist and frequent collaborator Matt Copson in October, and it was followed by an EP of the same name. Felicita and Copson also presented a 'A Woodland Truce' at the Serpentine Sackler Gallery, London featuring Marcus Nasty and Musarc. In March 2017, Felicita released the EP Ecce Homo, closely followed by a mix for the magazine Dazed. Felicita also composed the OST for the movie DRIB starring Brett Gelman, which premiered at SXSW 2017.

=== 2017–2022: Hej! ===
In December 2017, "Soft Power" - the collaborative performance between Felicita and the Polish traditional dance ensemble Śląsk - was brought to London for the first time. The collaboration was first performed at Unsound Festival, Kraków in 2016 and later performed at the Barbican Centre in London. Felicita and Estonian rapper TOMM¥ €A$H embarked on a European tour together in April 2018, and in May, Cash released "Little Molly", a track produced by felicita, A. G. Cook, and Tommy himself.

On 2 February 2018 at the Arizona State University Art Museum, felicita and Matt Copson debuted an "interdisciplinary project to restore an ancient animatronic doll". The artists worked and performed with the Phoenix Children's Choir as a part of the project. On 3 July 2018, felicita announced their debut album Hej! - named after its lead single which was released with a music video on 6 December 2017. The announcement was accompanied by the release of the album's second single and music video "Marzipan", which features vocals from Caroline Polachek and interpolates the traditional Polish lullaby "Był sobie król". Hej! was released on 3 August 2018 via PC Music.

=== 2022–Present: Spalarkle ===
In May 2022, as part of PC Music Vol. 3 Felicita released "Cluck" featuring vocals from Sarah Bonito of Kero Kero Bonito. In August 2022, Felicita released "Beast", a collaboration with Hong Kong-based rap artist Young Queenz. In March 2023, they announced their sophomore album Spalarkle to be released 5 May 2023, and released "Spalarkle (Alys)" featuring vocals from Caroline Polachek. The tracklist confirmed that previous singles "Cluck", "Beast" and "Riff Raff" are included on the album. Paper magazine characterized the album as a "psychedelic journey through chaotic electronica." A remix album, titled Spælarkle, was released on December 6, 2024.

== Personal life ==
Felicita is half Polish. They attended The School of Oriental and African Studies in London and speak fluent Mandarin Chinese. Felicita is non-binary and uses they/them, he/him and she/her pronouns.

== Discography ==
=== Albums ===
- Hej! (2018)
- Spalarkle (2023)
- Spælarkle [Remixes] (2024)

=== EPs ===
- Gumma (2011)
- (>'.')># (2013)
- Frenemies (2014)
- A New Family (2016)
- Ecce Homo (2017)

=== Mixtapes ===
- Touch Fume Skuz (2012)

=== Singles ===
Year	Title	Album
2010	Le Camion: Reshape	Le Camion: Reshape
2013	"Chlo / Bring It"	Non-album single
2014	"Doves"	Frenemies
2014	"Climb Up Eh"	Frenemies
2015	"Tails"	Non-album single
2015	"wubit ribit iwwwubit"	Non-album single
2016	"heads will roll / i will devour you"	Non-album single
2016	"A New Family"	A New Family & PC Music Vol. 2
2017	"hej!"	Hej!
2017	"Sweet Pea"	Non-album single
2017	"sulaharas"	Non-album single
2018	"Marzipan (feat. Caroline Polachek)"	Hej!
2018	"Coughing Up Amber / Shook"	Hej!
2022	"Cluck (with Kero Kero Bonito)"	PC Music Volume 3 & Spalarkle
2022	"Beast (feat. YoungQueenz)"	Spalarkle
2023	"Riff Raff (with OhEm)"	Spalarkle
2023	"Spalarkle (Alys) (feat. Caroline Polachek)"	Spalarkle
2024	"London-Kraków-Shanghai"	Spælarkle

=== Music videos ===
Year	Title
2013	"n my teeth"
2013	"doves"
2015	"A New Family"
2017	"hej!"
2018	"Marzipan (feat. Caroline Polachek)"
2023	"Spalarkle (Alys) (feat. Caroline Polachek)"

=== Remixes ===
Year	Artist	Title	Notes
2013	Yearning Kru	"Cracked Lacquer (Felicita - Lipgloss lips @ yearning kru)"	
2015	Kero Kero Bonito	"Picture This" (Felicita Remix)	
2017	Danny L Harle featuring Carly Rae Jepsen	"Super Natural" (Felicita Remix)	
2017	Kero Kero Bonito	"Picture This" (Felicita Remix)	New version released for Kero Kero Bonito remix EP
2017	Little Mix	"Get Weird!" (Felicita Remix)	
2020	jiafeng featuring AKINI JING	"FaceTime Love" (felicita Remix)	
2022	Namasenda featuring La Zowi	"Demonic" (felicita + Tohji Remix)	
2022	Omega Sapien	"Happycore (felicita Remix)"	
2022	Yawning Portal	"Notice The Direction of Fires - Felicita Live Remix"	

=== Guest appearances ===
Year	Title	Artist	Album	Notes
2019	"oooh heavy"		TOTAL SOLIDARITY	A compilation benefitting grassroot LGBTQIA+ organizations in Poland
2019	"oooh dreamy"		TOTAL SOLIDARITY	A compilation benefitting grassroot LGBTQIA+ organizations in Poland
2020	"Cytokine Storm" (with Alex Wang)		Home Fitness / 家庭保健	A charity compilation benefitting those struggling with the COVID-19 outbreak in China.
2020	"oberek (feat. felicita)"	Coals	Docusoap	While felicita is credited as a co-writer and feature, there are no production credits available for the album.

=== Production credits ===
Year	Title	Artist	Album	Produced with
2014	"Wannabe"	Lipgloss Twins	PC Music Vol. 1	A. G. Cook
2016	"Doodle"	Lipgloss Twins	PC Music Vol. 1 & 2	A. G. Cook
2018	"Little Molly"	Tommy Cash	Non-album single	A. G. Cook
