= Caroline Polachek =

American singer (born 1985)

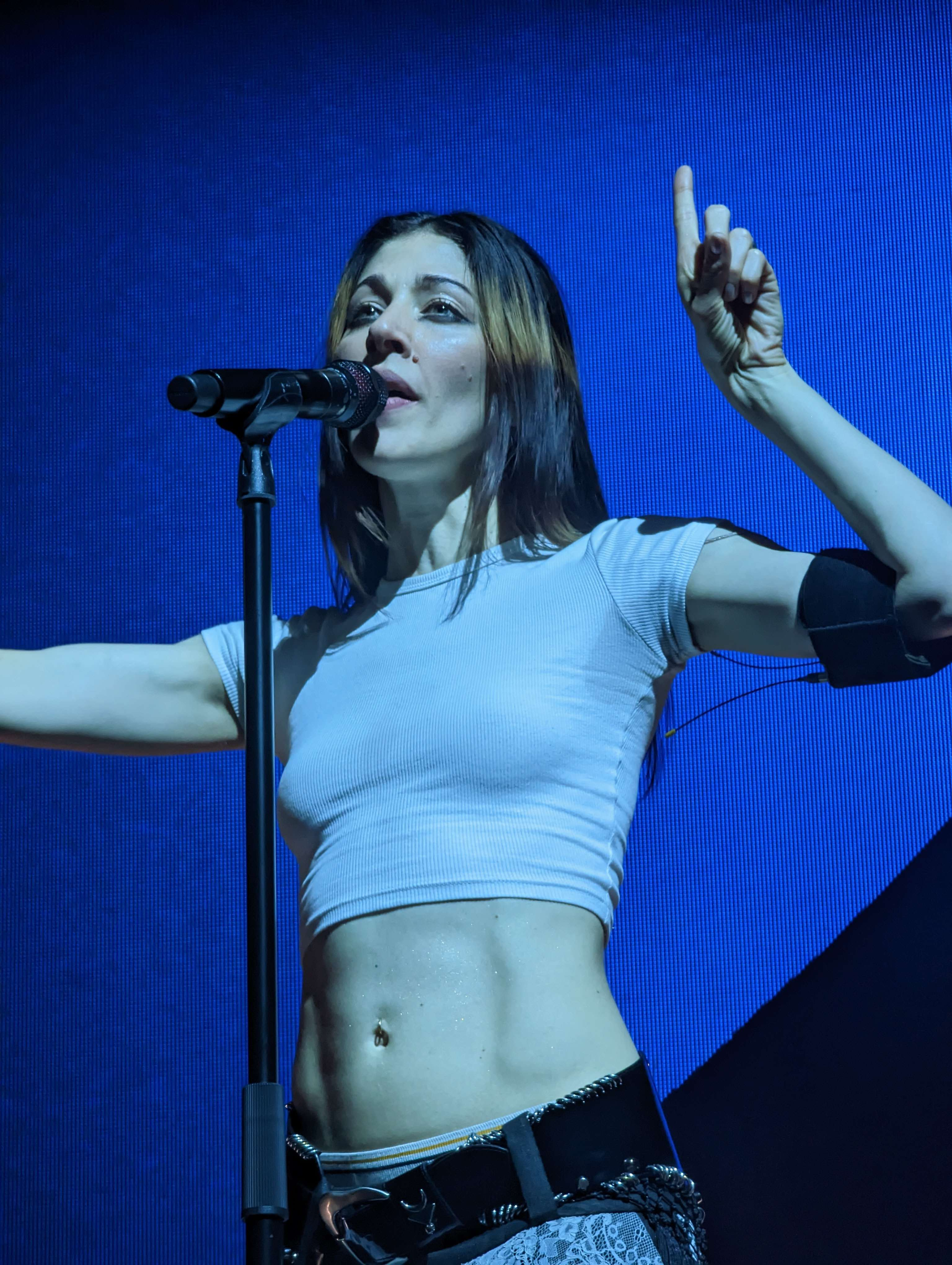
- Polachek performing live in 2023

Background information
- Also known as: Ramona Lisa; CEP
- Born: Caroline Elizabeth Polachek; June 20, 1985 (age 41); New York City, U.S.
- Origin: Greenwich, Connecticut, U.S.
- Genres: Alternative pop; art pop; indie pop; experimental pop; avant-pop
- Occupations: Singer; songwriter; record producer; whistler
- Works: Discography
- Years active: 2005–present
- Labels: Columbia; Terrible; Pannonica; Perpetual Novice; The Orchard; Sony
- Formerly of: Chairlift
- Spouse(s): Ian Drennan (m. 2015; div. 2017)
- Education: University of Colorado Boulder; New York University
- Website: carolinepolachek.com

Caroline Elizabeth Polachek (born June 20, 1985) is an American singer, producer, and songwriter. Raised in Connecticut, Polachek cofounded the indie pop band Chairlift while studying at the University of Colorado Boulder. The duo emerged from the late-2000s Brooklyn music scene with the sleeper hit "Bruises." In 2014, she released her first solo project, Arcadia, as Ramona Lisa. Under CEP, she released Drawing the Target Around the Arrow in 2017.

Chairlift disbanded in 2017, and Polachek embarked on a career under her own name. Her 2019 album Pang featured an avant-pop sound and was released to critical acclaim, with the single "So Hot You're Hurting My Feelings" receiving viral attention. In 2023, Polachek released Desire, I Want To Turn Into You, which became her first album to enter the charts in multiple territories. It was nominated for Best Engineered Album at the 66th Annual Grammy Awards.

Polachek has worked extensively with other artists, collaborating with Blood Orange, Fischerspooner, Charli XCX, Oneohtrix Point Never and Flume, as well as writing material for Beyoncé ("No Angel").

== Early life ==
Polachek was born in Manhattan, New York City, on June 20, 1985, to James Montel Polachek (1944–2020), a scholar in Chinese history and trained classical musician, and Elizabeth Allan. Her father was of Ashkenazi Jewish descent, while her mother has Scottish and English ancestry. Her family relocated to Tokyo, Japan, where she lived between the ages of one and six, and later settled in Greenwich, Connecticut, where Polachek started singing choir in the third grade. She was a synthesizer player from a young age as her father gave her a Yamaha keyboard to dissuade her from being disruptive on the piano.

Polachek's parents divorced in 1994. She describes herself as "a very hyperactive kid" and said that they would play Enya at their respective houses to calm her senses. Polachek recounts her early exposure to traditional Japanese songs and anime themes as being influential on her musical education. She rode horses growing up. As a teenager, she began traveling to New York to attend concerts, which were a mix of post-hardcore emo, DIY punk, and jazz shows. Mike Patton of Faith No More once personally walked her into a show at the Knitting Factory when her fake ID was rejected. She played in a couple of bands in high school and college.

== Career ==
=== 2006–2012: Career beginnings, Chairlift ===
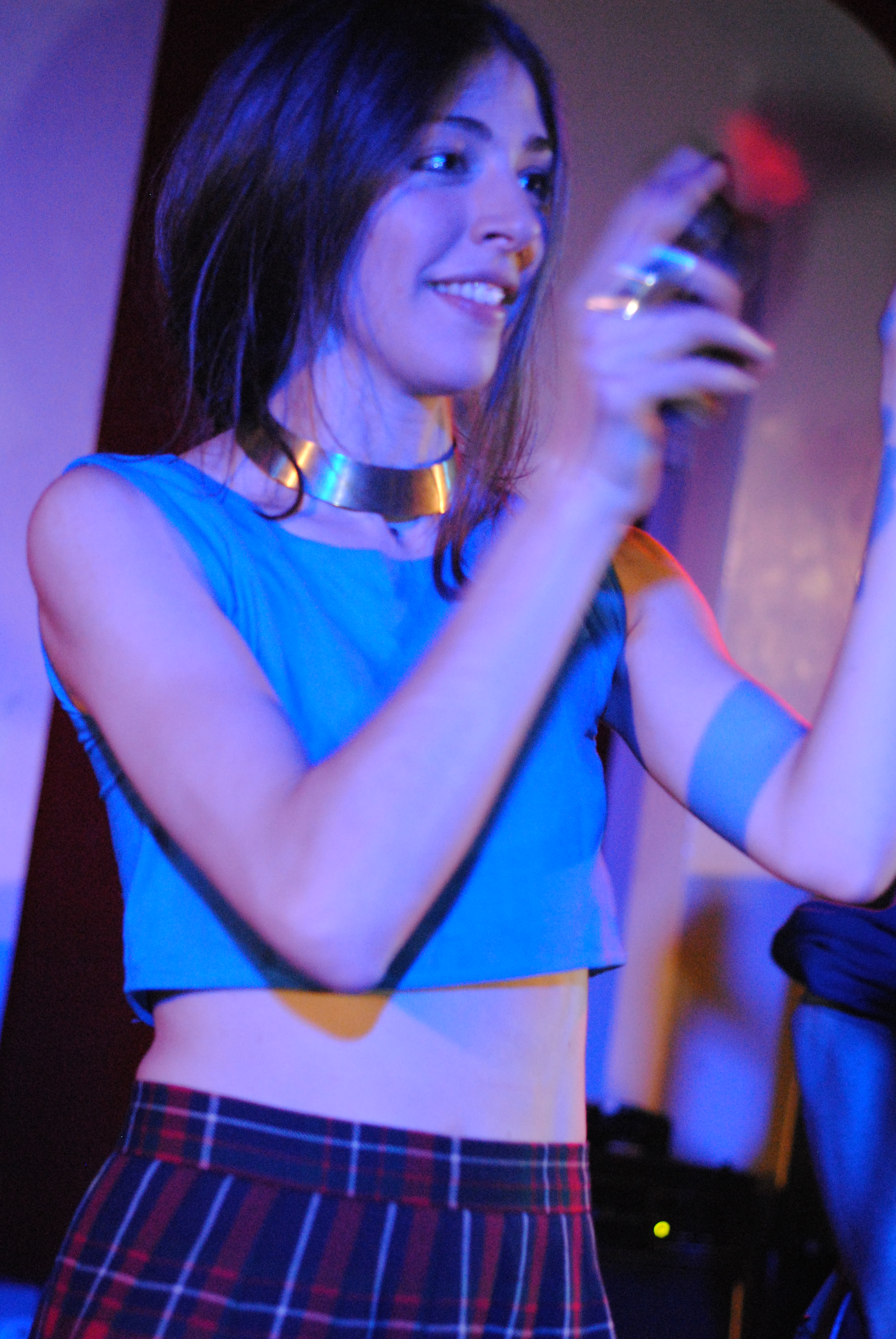
Polachek with Chairlift in 2012

Polachek founded the band Chairlift with Aaron Pfenning after the pair met during her sophomore year at the University of Colorado. They relocated to New York, where Polachek studied art at New York University, and were joined by Patrick Wimberly in early 2007. That year, the band released their first EP, Daylight Savings, followed by their debut studio album Does You Inspire You in 2008. Does You Inspire You included the track "Bruises," which was licensed for synch in a 2008 ad for Apple's iPod Nano.

Polachek and Wimberly went on as a duo to write and produce their second studio album Something (2012) alongside producers Dan Carey and Alan Moulder. In addition, she directed the album's music videos, including "Amanaemonesia" and "I Belong in Your Arms."

=== 2013–2015: Arcadia ===
Polachek began performing sets under the moniker Ramona Lisa in 2013. The name originates from a former pseudonym Polachek used on Facebook. She announced her debut self-produced studio album as Ramona Lisa, entitled Arcadia, in February 2014. Polachek described the album as "pastoral electronic music."

Polachek began writing the album during an artistic residency at the Villa Medici in Rome, Italy. In an interview with Pitchfork, she described how her time in Rome inspired the sounds of Arcadia, stating: "When I was looking out the window in Rome, I wanted this type of electronic music to feel as organic as what I was seeing. I don't think any of the tools that I'm using are particularly new—a lot of the MIDI instruments have been around for 15 years—but the compositions make them sound less electronic, more mysterious." The record was made entirely on Polachek's laptop without instruments or external microphones, except to capture field recordings of the sounds she heard in her surroundings. She sang vocals directly into her computer's built in microphone, making use of hotel closets, quiet airport gates, and spare dressing rooms during Chairlift's world tour. The album artwork was shot by New York photographer Tim Barber.

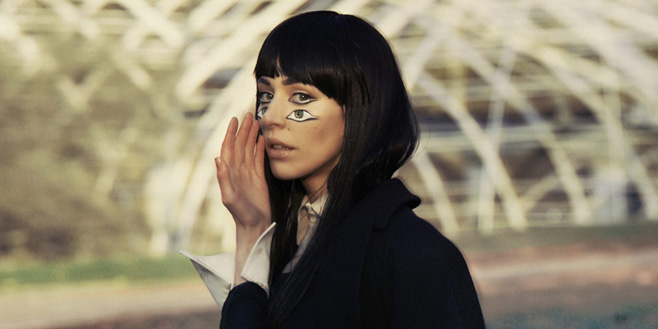
Polachek as Ramona Lisa in 2014

In early 2014, Polachek composed and produced instrumental scores for designers Proenza Schouler and Tess Giberson to be featured on runways and promotional videos. In April, she scored a live performance piece by artists India Menuez and Hayden Dunham at SIGNAL gallery in Brooklyn. In October, Polachek scored "HappyOkay," a ballet performance video directed by Elena Parasco and produced by House of Makers and Last Hour. The performance was choreographed by Peter Lueng of the Dutch National Ballet, the largest dance company in the Netherlands, and performed by New York City Ballet's Harrison Ball, Joseph Gordon, and Megan LeCrone.

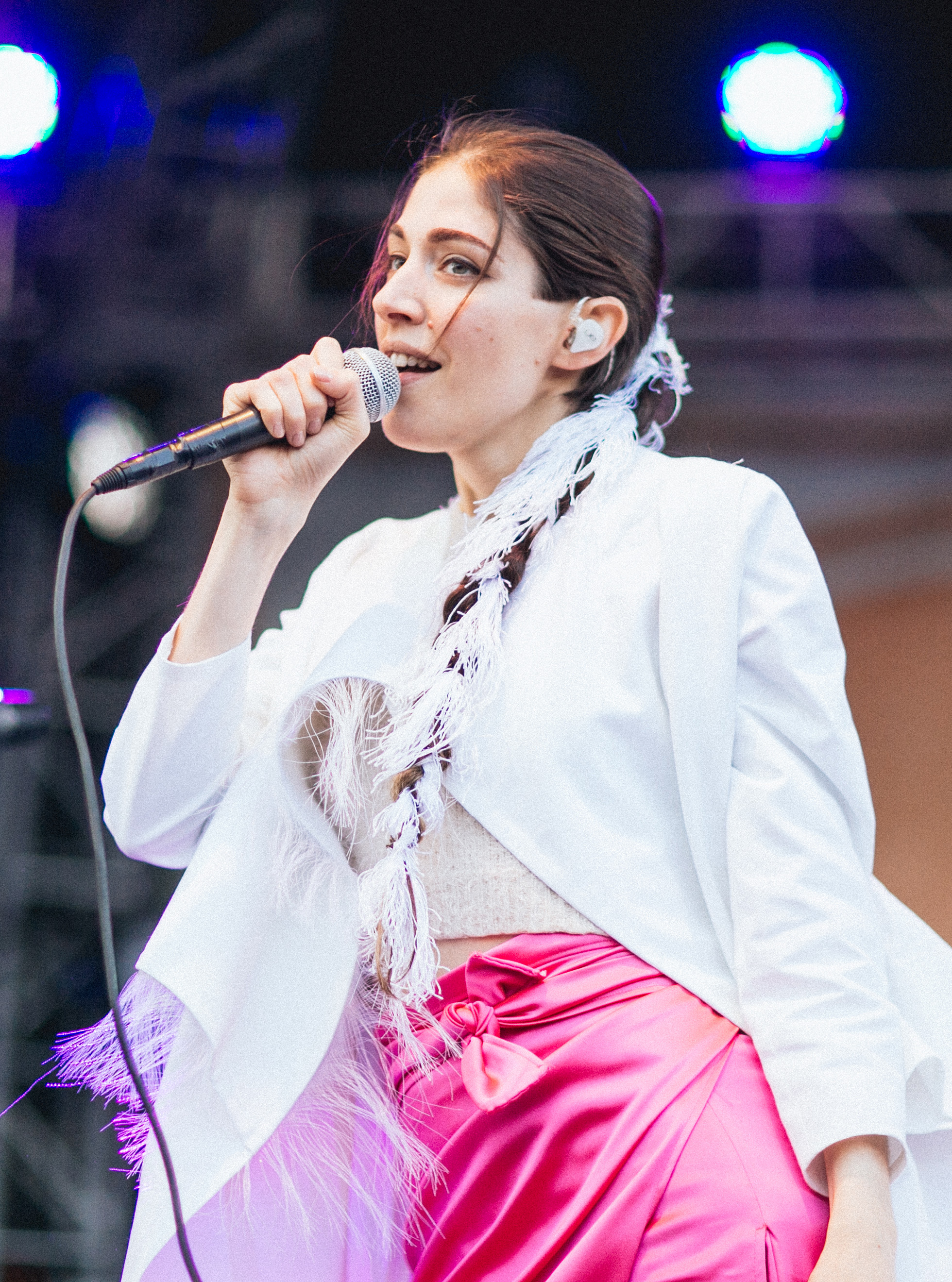
Polachek performing at the 2016 Treefort Music Fest in Boise, Idaho

=== 2016–2017: End of Chairlift and Drawing the Target Around the Arrow ===
On January 22, 2016, Chairlift released their third and final studio album, Moth. In December of the same year, the band announced that they would be breaking up, with a final tour in the spring of 2017.

In January 2017, Polachek released her second solo studio album, Drawing the Target Around the Arrow, under her initials, CEP. She was scheduled to perform at Moogfest 2018, but pulled out in December 2017 when the festival advertised a list of female artists performing that year, despite the festival line-up being predominantly male. She followed up with a statement on Twitter saying: "This speaks not to the artists or their music, but to the politics of the festival and self-congratulatory PR. To do this without permission from the artists on display is exploitative and unprofessional," adding "Moogfest, and all other festivals, simply have a responsibility to position inclusivity as normal."

=== 2019–2021: Pang ===
In June 2019, Polachek released her debut single under her full name titled "Door." In a press release, Polachek announced that the single was the beginning of a new project, made mostly in collaboration with PC Music member Danny L Harle. Later in July, Polachek released two singles off of the project, titled "Ocean of Tears" and "Parachute," and began to detail her then upcoming studio album Pang which was released on October 18. The fourth single, "So Hot You're Hurting My Feelings," would go on to earn RIAA Gold Certification in 2024. The album received critical acclaim and placed on many critics' end of the year lists.

A remix album titled Standing at the Gate: Remix Collection was released on vinyl on April 16, 2021. In promotion, Polachek released five of the album's remixes as singles, as well as a cover of the Corrs' "Breathless."

=== 2021–present: Desire, I Want to Turn Into You ===
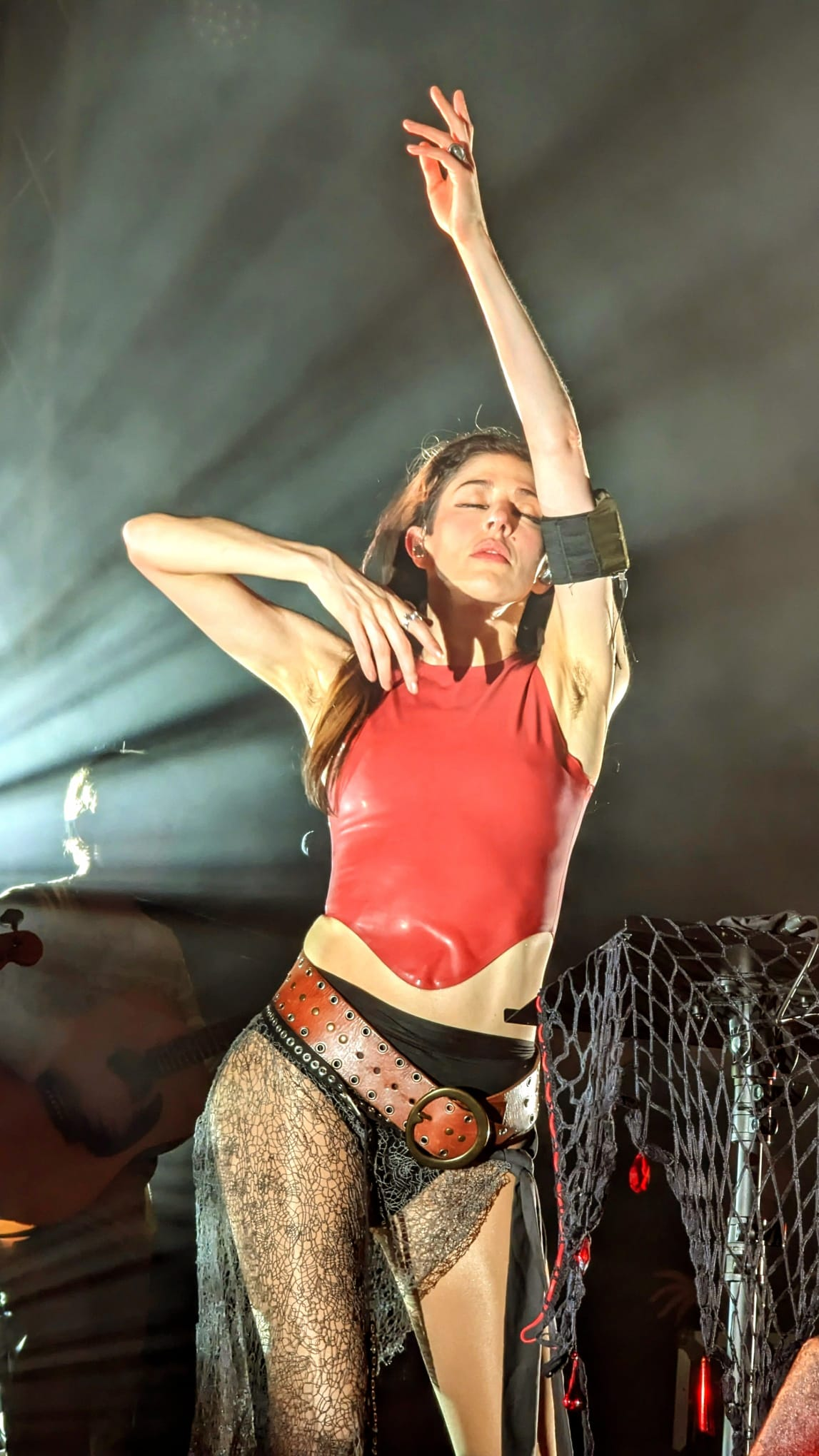
Polachek performing in Bristol, England, 2023

In September 2021, Polachek was announced as one of the opening acts on Dua Lipa's US Leg of her Future Nostalgia Tour. The tour began on February 9, 2022.

On July 14, 2021, Polachek released the single "Bunny Is a Rider," another collaboration with Harle; she told Crack magazine that the song was part of a future project. In December, Pitchfork ranked "Bunny Is a Rider" at the top of their list of "The 100 Best Songs of 2021." In late 2021, Polachek announced a U.S. tour with French artist Oklou as support, marking her first major solo headlining run in North America. On February 9, 2022, Polachek released the single "Billions." In June, Polachek confirmed that she was working on her fourth studio album, posting a picture of herself in studio with Harle on Instagram. She recorded a cover version of "Bang Bang (My Baby Shot Me Down)" for the Minions: The Rise of Gru soundtrack album, released on July 1, 2022. On October 17, her flamenco-inspired single "Sunset", a co-production with Sega Bodega, was released.

On December 5, 2022, Polachek released the single "Welcome to My Island" and announced her second studio album under her full name, Desire, I Want to Turn Into You, for release on February 14, 2023. The album received critical acclaim and includes "Bunny Is a Rider," "Billions," "Sunset," and "Welcome to My Island". After the release, she embarked on the Spiraling Tour through Europe and North America.

Her song "Sunset" from Desire, I Want To Turn Into You is featured in the 2023 film After Everything.

On October 17, 2023, Polachek released the single "Dang." Months later on February 7, 2024, she released a remix of her song "Butterfly Net" with Weyes Blood. The two tracks were later included in the reissue of Desire, named the Everasking Edition, which released just a week later. On May 2, 2024, Polachek released the single "Starburned and Unkissed" as part of the soundtrack for the A24 film I Saw the TV Glow. Polachek is featured on the remix version of "Everything is romantic" in Charli XCX's remix album Brat and It's Completely Different but Also Still Brat, which was released on October 11.

Polachek collaborated with video game designer and auteur Hideo Kojima to write an original song for 2025 video game Death Stranding 2: On the Beach, titled "On the Beach," which was released on 23 June 2025.

== Artistry ==
=== Musical style ===
Polachek's musical style has been described as mainly alternative pop, along with art pop, indie pop, experimental pop, and avant-pop. Shaad D'Souza of The Guardian wrote that "before 'Running Up That Hill' returned to the charts, Polachek was shaping up to be something like Gen Z's Kate Bush – a producer and vocalist interested in music that's formally eccentric and unapologetic about her own too much-ness."

=== Influences ===
Polachek's influences have been described as "eclectic" by music critics. When asked about her earliest musical influence by Interview, she responded that it was "probably Enya." Growing up in Japan until the age of six, she was exposed to traditional Japanese songs and anime themes, which she says were influential on her musical education; she stated that Japanese singing consists of "a lot of minor and pentatonic [tonality], with really angular melodies that I think really stuck in my subconscious." She named Mishio Ogawa in particular as "one of [her] biggest influences." Other vocal influences include Celine Dion and Matia Bazar's song "Ti sento". She also credits riding horses as a child with helping her "[learn] a lot about rhythm and about voice."

Polachek says that she "grew up kneeling at the altar of alternative music" and that Björk, Kate Bush, and Fiona Apple were her "absolute heroes" when she was a teenager. Her alter ego Ramona Lisa was inspired by "artists whose looks were inseparable from their music", such as Nirvana, Marilyn Manson, and David Bowie. She named those artists, along with Björk and Busta Rhymes, as influences for her visual identity. She called Paddy McAloon of Prefab Sprout her "favorite lyricist" and stated that she is "very inspired by contemporary artists like Rosalía or Doja Cat, who play with sounds." She also finds inspiration in "more abstract" domains beyond music, such as landscapes; in a 2024 interview with Out, she named swallows as her musical soulmates.

Polachek also named Kittie as one of her influences for her "straight-up grunge" song, "Starburned and Unkissed."

=== Musical collaborations ===
In 2008, Polachek formed Girl Crisis choir with twelve other female singers, including members of Au Revoir Simone and Class Actress. The modular group arranged and recorded two cover versions a year from 2008 to 2013, including songs by Black Sabbath, Nirvana, Leonard Cohen, the Bangles, and Ace of Base.

In 2010, Polachek joined Jorge Elbrecht of Brooklyn-based Violens to record a "sgin" of Justin Bieber's "Never Let You Go": "We went on YouTube to find a video among the highest ranks of hits, and came across 'Never Let You Go'. We went on to make what we call a 'sgin' (anagram of the word 'sing')—an original song written specifically to synch into someone else's video on mute." The same year, she also recorded a duet with Violens, "Violent Sensation Descends (French Duet Version)." She later shot and directed the music video for the band's song "It Couldn't Be Perceived" in 2011. She collaborated with Elbrecht again on the EP Gloss Coma 001 in 2013, which includes the single "I.V. Aided Dreams."

In 2012, Polachek featured on the song "Everything Is Spoilt by Use" by Ice Choir, a solo project by Kurt Feldman of The Pains of Being Pure at Heart; she also directed and edited the song's music video. Polachek collaborated with Blood Orange on the tracks "Chamakay" in 2013 and "Holy Will" in 2018. In 2013, she co-wrote and co-produced "No Angel." which was featured on Beyoncé's critically acclaimed fifth studio album Beyoncé. Due to her production and engineering work on the song, Beyoncé's nomination for the Grammy Award for Album of the Year at the 57th ceremony included Polachek. In 2013, she also contributed vocals to "Unhold" by the Spanish alternative-dance band Delorean.

Polachek featured on Danny L Harle's single "Ashes of Love" in 2016. In 2017, she appeared on two songs from Charli XCX's mixtape Pop 2: as a featured artist on "Tears" and as a backing vocalist on "Delicious," the latter of which features Tommy Cash. In 2018, Polachek featured on Felicita's version of the traditional Polish song "Był sobie król," released on their debut studio album Hej! under the title "Marzipan."

In 2020, Polachek featured on "La vita nuova" by Christine and the Queens and made a guest appearance in the short film around the EP of the same name. The song was later remixed by various producers including PC Music founder A. G. Cook.

On November 4, 2021, Charli XCX released "New Shapes" featuring Christine and the Queens and Polachek as the second single from her studio album Crash (2022).

In March, she was featured on Australian electronic music producer Flume's single "Sirens," released ahead of his 2022 studio album Palaces.

In September 2026, Caroline Polachek collaborated with Belgian singer Angèle on the song Love Triangle, produced by Sebastian (French musician) and released on September 29, 2026. Blending pop and electronic music, the track appears on Angèle's third studio album, Instinct (Angèle album).

== Personal life ==
Polachek dated Chairlift bandmate Aaron Pfenning for some time; Pfenning departed the band in January 2010 sometime after his romantic relationship with Polachek ended. In 2015, Polachek's wedding to artist Ian Drennan was extensively photographed by Vogue magazine. They divorced in 2017. As of December 2022, she is in a relationship with Matt Copson, an artist. Her father died of COVID-19 in 2020. In October 2023, Polachek co-signed a publicized open Artists4Ceasefire letter to President Joe Biden, urging him to call for a ceasefire in the Gaza war.

Polachek traveled a lot for her work, mainly staying at her bosse's apartment in Williamsburg, Brooklyn. In 2011, Polachek lived in Greenpoint, Brooklyn.

== Discography ==
- Arcadia (2014)
- Drawing the Target Around the Arrow (2017)
- Pang (2019)
- Desire, I Want to Turn Into You (2023)

== Tours ==
=== Headlining ===
- Pang Tour (2019–2020)
- Heart Is Unbreaking Tour (2021)
- Spiraling Tour (2023)

=== Supporting ===
- Dua Lipa – Future Nostalgia Tour (2022)
- The 1975 – At Their Very Best (2023)
- Harry Styles - Together, Together (2027)

== Awards and nominations ==
Accolades for Caroline Polachek
Award	Year	Nominated work	Category	Result	Ref.
Brit Awards	2024	Herself	International Artist of the Year	Nominated	
Grammy Awards	2014	Beyoncé	Album of the Year (as a songwriter and producer)	Nominated	
Grammy Awards	2024	Desire, I Want to Turn Into You	Best Engineered Album, Non-Classical (as an engineer)	Nominated	
Libera Awards	2024	Desire, I Want to Turn Into You	Record of the Year	Nominated	
Libera Awards	2024	Desire, I Want to Turn Into You	Best Alternative Rock Record	Won	
Libera Awards	2024	Desire, I Want to Turn Into You	Self-Released Record of the Year	Won	
Resonator Awards	2024	Herself	Golden Trifecta Award	Won	
