= Hej! =

Studio album by felicita
- Released: 3 August 2018
- Genres: Electronic; experimental; pop; Polish folk music
- Length: 32:02
- Label: PC Music

Felicita chronology
Ecce Homo (2017)	Hej! (2018)	Spalarkle (2023)

Singles from Hej!
- 1. "Hej!" Released: 6 December 2017; 2. "Marzipan" Released: 3 July 2018; 3. "Coughing Up Amber / Shook" Released: 26 July 2018

Hej! (stylized in all lowercase) is the debut studio album by English producer Felicita. It was released on 3 August 2018 by PC Music. The tracklist includes previously released singles "Marzipan" and "Coughing Up Amber / Shook". The album was described by the producer as "a set of musical paper cuttings; a nu-Slavic folk tale; the soundtrack to a lonely dancer's journey across the Arizona desert." The producer further explained that title is Polish for "hey!" - "You can say it when greeting a friend, or when saying goodbye."

== Background ==
The album was written during 2016 and 2017 in Shanghai and Los Angeles and "formed" in Kraków. Different versions of tracks 4–6 previously appeared on felicita's 2017 EP Ecce Homo, although tracks 4 and 5 were originally titled "Soft Power" and "People Don't Change (They Die)", respectively. "Night Soil (Fade Out)" had been played live by Felicita since early 2016, and a studio demo was premiered in their mix for NTS Radio under the title "Religioso" in January 2017. The music video for "Hej!" was released on 6 December 2017 to promote the London debut of Felicita's collaborative performance "Soft Power" with Śląsk Dance Ensemble at the Barbican Centre a couple of days later. The video was accompanied by an announcement of a full-length album due in the following year, but the details of the album were unknown until July 2018. The titles of "Elena" and "Elena Again" reference the producer's early 2018 museum exhibit with Matt Copson in Phoenix, Arizona.

"Marzipan", a collaboration with American musician Caroline Polachek, was teased throughout June 2018 but received its official release as a digital download and music video on 3 July 2018. Its release was accompanied by the reveal of the album's tracklist, cover art, and title, as well as the ability to pre-order it. The song is a reworking of "Był sobie król", a Polish lullaby about a king, princess, and page who all eat each other (and are revealed to be composed of sugar, gingerbread, and marzipan, respectively, at the end of the song).

"Coughing Up Amber" and "Shook" were released in the form of a double A-side on 26 July 2018. The former track interpolates previous Felicita tracks "Coughing Up Pearls" from the 2016 A New Family EP and "I Will Devour You", and Felicita stated that it "began life as 'Coughing Up Pearls'..., was reworked for the soft power dance piece, and rose back to life for [the album]." "Shook" was described by the artist as "a simple dance riff, pushed hard till it fizzed."

== Composition and recording ==
In an interview with Tank, Felicita described the album as being "like taking a set of old wooden dolls out of a glass cabinet, wiping away the dust, taking them apart, re-arranging the heads, limbs and torsos, giving each doll a new coat of paint, then presenting them as free gifts to passers-by." On recording vocals for "Soft Power II", Felicita stated that along with Caroline Polachek they had "put a mic in the middle of the room and jumped up and down, stamping and clicking our heels against the floor." Felicita also revealed that in the aforementioned track, the listener "can hear me falling into a metal chair and Caroline laughing." Additionally, it was mentioned that the heavily distorted vocals in "Shook" were recorded on Christmas Day of 2016, and that "Night Soil" is a remix of Felicita's 2015 single "Tails" made with a mobile app. The latter also samples "When You Get Home" from Felicita's 2014 EP Frenemies.

The album has been described by Tank as "uncanny and dreamlike", "utterly new and uncannily familiar", and "enchanting but quite often frightening too." They detailed the album as having "vertiginous blurs of muted pianos, giddy synths and warped vocals." MusicOMH noted that the album had both "flashes of the turbo-charged future pop that PC Music made their name with" as well as "abstract ambient production".

== Critical reception ==
Professional ratings
Aggregate scores
Source	Rating
Metacritic	76/100
Review scores
Source	Rating
The 405	8/10
The Line of Best Fit	8/10
MusicOMH	3/5 stars
PopMatters	8/10

Hej! received positive reviews upon its release. The album holds a score of 76 on Metacritic based on eight reviews. In a positive review from The 405, the album was described as "at once a debut album and a retrospective of the many facets of Felicita's artistry", and the review highlighted the title track, "Coughing Up Amber", "Shook", and "Marzipan". Furthermore, the reviewer stated that the album "certainly belongs to be mentioned in the same regard" as other "great experimental electronic albums that explore personality and self", citing 2018 examples from Lotic, Sophie and Rival Consoles. The Line of Best Fit compared the album's narrative structure to the works of influential filmmaker Maya Deren, and summed up the album as "an evolution for Felicita and, by extension, PC Music". The publication listed "Mosaic Genetics" and "Marzipan" as highlights and "the two most delicate moments" on the album, as well as citing "Shook" and "Coughing Up Amber" as having "brash dance rhythms".

== Track listing ==
No.	Title	Length
1.	"Hej!"	2:09
2.	"Coughing Up Amber"	4:34
3.	"Elena"	1:12
4.	"Soft Power I"	3:06
5.	"Soft Power II"	5:30
6.	"Shook"	2:09
7.	"Marzipan" (featuring Caroline Polachek)	5:20
8.	"Elena Again"	2:14
9.	"Night Soil (Fade Out)"	2:12
10.	"Mosaic Genetics"	3:40
Total length:		32:02

Notes

- All titles are stylized in all lowercase.
- "Marzipan" is a reinterpretation of a Polish lullaby "Królewna, król i paź" ("The Princess, the King and the Page"; 1932–33), better known as "Był sobie król" ("There Once Was a King"), penned by Janina Porazińska and composed by Jan Ernst.
