= Arcadia (Ramona Lisa album) =

Studio album by Ramona Lisa
- Released: April 14, 2014
- Genres: Pop; electronic; lo-fi; ambient
- Length: 41:44
- Label: Terrible
- Producer: Caroline Polachek

Ramona Lisa chronology
Arcadia (2014)	Drawing the Target Around the Arrow (2017)

Singles from Arcadia
- 1. "Arcadia" Released: February 18, 2014; 2. "Backwards and Upwards" Released: March 7, 2014; 3. "Dominic" Released: April 24, 2014

Arcadia is the debut studio album by American singer-songwriter and producer Caroline Polachek, and her only album released under the pseudonym Ramona Lisa. It was released on April 15, 2014 through Terrible Records in North America, Bella Union imprint Pannonica in Europe and Japan, and Mistletone in Australia and New Zealand. The album was promoted by the singles "Arcadia", "Backwards and Upwards", and "Dominic".

In September 2014 Arcadia was made available for free via a partnership with BitTorrent. An EP called Dominic was released on September 9, 2014, featuring an English and French version of the title track as well as new song "Walking in the Cemetery" and a cover of Psychic TV's "The Orchids". An acoustic EP called Piano Versions was released on March 3, 2015.

== Background ==
Caroline Polachek began performing sets under the moniker Ramona Lisa in 2013, a name originating from her Facebook profile. Of the name, Polachek said "Ramona Lisa is a format; she’s not a person, she’s more like a genre or maybe more like a screenplay. It’s like a set of images, motifs and shapes that kind of all work together for me." Polachek began writing the album during an artistic residency at the Villa Medici in Rome, Italy. In an interview with Pitchfork, she described how her time in Rome inspired the sounds of Arcadia, stating: "When I was looking out the window in Rome, I wanted this type of electronic music to feel as organic as what I was seeing. I don't think any of the tools that I'm using are particularly new—a lot of the MIDI instruments have been around for 15 years—but the compositions make them sound less electronic, more mysterious." The record was made entirely on Polachek's laptop without instruments or external microphones, except to capture field recordings of the sounds she heard in her surroundings. She sang vocals directly into her computer's built in microphone, making use of hotel closets, quiet airport gates, and spare dressing rooms while on tour with dream pop band Chairlift. The album artwork was shot by New York photographer Tim Barber.

== Composition ==
Polachek described the album as "pastoral electronic music" and “a concept album of love songs that are nature allegories". The eleven songs of Arcadia flow together seamlessly "as Polachek explores the tumult, angst and bittersweet resolve of love".

The title track is described as "an uncanny creeper of a song" that "positively drips with ominous atmosphere". "Backwards and Upwards" is a "dystopian electro-pop tune" that is a sequel to Chairlift's "I Belong in Your Arms". "Getaway Car" is a lo-fi electronica song about arson and "fanciful theft". "Dominic" is a doo-wop-inspired ambient pop track that "wades through the emotional undercurrent of going separate ways in a pale morning after". Closing track "I Love Our World" is an ambient field recording that "comprises random bursts of organ, mobile phone interference and the occasional tingle of bells".

== Critical reception ==
Professional ratings
Aggregate scores
Source	Rating
Metacritic	69/100
Review scores
Source	Rating
AllMusic	4/5 stars
Consequence of Sound	C
Drowned in Sound	6/10
The Guardian	4/5 stars
NME	3.5/5 stars
Pitchfork	6.8/10
Rolling Stone	3.5/5 stars
Under the Radar	7/10

Arcadia received a score of 69 out of 100 from review aggregate site Metacritic based on 12 reviews, indicating "generally favorable reviews". Writing in Consequence of Sound, Zander Porter said that while the lo-fi production elements were appreciated, it still underwhelms. Tim Jonze of The Guardian called the album "a beguiling side project that feels organic and experimental". In a review for Electronic Beats, Ben Goldwasser wrote that "Arcadia sounds rich and meticulously arranged and is constantly taking unexpected directions." He observed "a great blend of old and new", likening "Avenues" to 1980s synth-pop band OMD. Katherine St. Asaph of Pitchfork praised the album's pastoral sound and that "it suggests there's more interesting work yet to come from her", but said that it was unlikely to win Polachek any new fans. Drowned in Sound's Russell Warfield called the songs "underdeveloped" but "evidently a labour of love for Polachek".

The album was included on Under the Radar and Dazed Digital's lists of the best albums of 2014, at number 83 and 18 respectively.

== Track listing ==
All tracks are written by Caroline Polachek.

Arcadia track listing
No.	Title	Length
1.	"Arcadia"	4:11
2.	"Backwards and Upwards"	4:00
3.	"Getaway Ride"	3:55
4.	"Avenues"	2:41
5.	"Lady's Got Gills"	4:34
6.	"Hissing Pipes at Dawn (They're Playing Our Song)"	2:14
7.	"Dominic"	3:57
8.	"Arcadia Reprise"	0:57
9.	"Izzit True What They Tell Me"	5:16
10.	"Wings of the Parapets"	3:14
11.	"I Love Our World"	5:45
Total length:		41:44

=== Note ===
- On digital releases, "Hissing Pipes at Dawn (They're Playing Our Song)" is simply titled "Hissing Pipes at Dawn".

== Personnel ==
Credits adapted from the album's liner notes.

- Caroline Polachek – performance, production, instrument programming, recording
- Patrick Wimberly – mixing
- Jake Aron – mix engineering
- Miles B. A. Robinson – mix engineering
- Chris Gehringer – mastering
- Nikolay Saveliev – design, illustration
- Tim Barber – photography
