= The Bloom Tour =

2018–19 concert tour by Troye Sivan

- Tour by Troye Sivan
- Promotional poster for North American leg of tour
- Associated album: Bloom
- Start date: 21 September 2018
- End date: 30 November 2019
- Legs: 6
- No. of shows: 29 in North America; 18 in Europe; 5 in South America; 12 in Asia; 6 in Oceania; 67 total

Troye Sivan concert chronology
- Suburbia Tour (2016); The Bloom Tour (2018–19); Something to Give Each Other Tour (2024)

The Bloom Tour was the fourth headlining concert tour by Australian singer Troye Sivan, in support of his sophomore album, Bloom (2018). It began on 21 September 2018 in Irving, United States and ended on 30 November 2019 in Chengdu, China.

== Background ==
On 28 May 2018, Sivan announced the North American leg. The leg was set to feature German singer and songwriter Kim Petras as the main opening act with American singer-songwriters Leland and Carlie Hanson in selected dates. The announcement of Kim Petras as an opening act resulted in backlash due to her association with American record producer Dr. Luke who was sued by American singer Kesha for sexual abuse. Petras stated in an interview with NME that she would not work with someone she believed was an abuser of women when questioned about working with him. She released a statement on social media apologizing and saying that while she had been open about her positive experiences with Dr. Luke, it did not negate other people's experiences. Sivan released a statement saying that he was not aware of Petras' comments about Dr. Luke but that while her comments did not align with his views, he supported her as an artist and person and they had spoken to each other personally to address her comments.

The presale tickets went on sale on 5 June through Sivan's official app. Latin American leg featured festival appearances during Lollapalooza in Argentina, Chile and Brazil. Two sideshow dates were announced in Buenos Aires and São Paulo. The European leg dates was announced on 19 November 2018, followed by the tickets sale four days later. The Asian legs was announced on 14 February 2019. The Australian and New Zealand leg was announced on 21 June 2019, with tickets on sale on 28 June 2019. Three additional dates in China were announced on 24 September 2019, with tickets on sale on 30 September 2019.

== Critical reception ==
Reviewing for the opening night in Irving, Isabel Arcellana of Dallas Observer praised Sivan's stage presence and vocal performance but criticized the set that "could have been more original" and long breaks between wardrobe change. Eric Webb of Austin360 called Sivan "held his arms open in a joyful celebration of queer identity and love" in his show in Austin. Brittany Spanos of Rolling Stone praised Sivan for "carried himself well on stage, embodying the sweeping, changing emotions of each of his songs with grace." Natalia Manzocco of Now rated the show in Toronto four out of five stars and called it "beautifully and explicitly queer." While reviewing the show in Denver, Tyler Harvey of 303 Magazine praised the set list and called it "merged with emotional, daring and raw authenticity." Olivia Khiel of Atlas Artist Group described the show in Phoenix "a joy." Reviewing the show in San Diego, Jahfreen Alam of The Guardian (UCSD) gave it a rate of B and called it "a celebration of youth, growing up and finding yourself."

Rachel Bowles of The Skinny rated the show in Glasgow four of five stars and said Sivan "put his absolute all into forging those precious moments with the crowd." Meliza Sestito of aAh! Magazine described the show in Manchester as "a positive and uplifting experience." Writing for NME, Sophie Williams praised the show and called it as a "communal celebration of what it truly means to be young, queer and free."

== Set list ==
This set list is from the concert on 28 February 2019 in London, England. It is not intended to represent all tour dates.

1. "Seventeen"
2. "Bloom"
3. "Plum"
4. "Heaven"
5. "Fools"
6. "Lucky Strike"
7. "Wild"
8. "I'm So Tired..."
9. "Postcard"
10. "The Good Side"
11. "What a Heavenly Way to Die"
12. "Bite"
13. "1999"
14. "Dance to This"
15. "Animal"

Encore

16. "Youth"
17. "My My My!"

Notes

- ''1999'' was added to the setlist starting in New York City.

== Tour dates ==
List of concerts, showing date, city, country and venue
Date	City	Country	Venue
2018
Leg 1 — North America
21 September	Irving	US	Pavilion at Toyota Music Factory
23 September	Austin	US	Austin City Limits
24 September	Sugar Land	US	Smart Financial Centre
26 September	Jacksonville	US	Daily's Place
28 September	St. Petersburg	US	Mahaffey Theater
29 September	Miami	US	Klipsch Amphitheatre
1 October	Atlanta	US	Coca-Cola Roxy Theatre
2 October	Charlotte	US	Metro Credit Union Amphitheatre
4 October	Washington, D.C.	US	The Anthem
6 October	Upper Darby	US	Tower Theater
9 October	New York City	US	Radio City Music Hall
11 October	Laval	Canada	Place Bell
12 October	Boston	US	Wang Theatre
14 October	Detroit	US	Fox Theatre
15 October	Toronto	Canada	Sony Centre
17 October	Minneapolis	US	State Theatre
19 October	Chicago	US	Chicago Theatre
20 October	Milwaukee	US	Eagles Ballroom
22 October	Denver	US	Fillmore Auditorium
24 October	Phoenix	US	Comerica Theatre
25 October	San Diego	US	CalCoast Credit Union Theatre
27 October	Anaheim	US	House of Blues
30 October	Los Angeles	US	Greek Theatre
1 November	San Francisco	US	SF Masonic Auditorium
2 November	San Francisco	US	SF Masonic Auditorium
5 November	Portland	US	Roseland Theater
7 November	Seattle	US	Paramount Theatre
8 November	Vancouver	Canada	Queen Elizabeth Theatre
2019
Leg 2 — Europe
23 February	Glasgow	Scotland	O_{2} Academy
24 February	Manchester	England	O_{2} Apollo Manchester
26 February	Birmingham	England	O_{2} Academy
28 February	London	England	Eventim Apollo
4 March	Antwerp	Belgium	Lotto Arena
5 March	Amsterdam	Netherlands	AFAS Live
9 March	Vienna	Austria	Planet.tt Bank Austria Halle
11 March	Milan	Italy	Fabrique
13 March	Munich	Germany	Tonhalle
14 March	Berlin	Germany	Tempodrom
16 March	Cologne	Germany	Palladium
18 March	Copenhagen	Denmark	Forum Black Box
19 March	Stockholm	Sweden	Cirkus
21 March	Oslo	Norway	Sentrum Scene
Leg 3 — South America
28 March	Buenos Aires	Argentina	Niceto Club
30 March (Note: The concert on 30 March 2019 at Hipódromo de San Isidro in Buenos Aires is part of Lollapalooza Argentina.)	Buenos Aires	Argentina	Hipódromo de San Isidro
31 March (Note: The concert on 31 March 2019 at Parque O'Higgins in Santiago is part of Lollapalooza Chile.)	Santiago	Chile	Parque O'Higgins
3 April	São Paulo	Brazil	Cine Jóia
5 April (Note: The concert on 5 April 2019 at Autódromo de Interlagos in São Paulo is part of Lollapalooza Brazil.)	São Paulo	Brazil	Autódromo de Interlagos
Leg 4 — Asia
22 April	Shanghai	China	Mercedes-Benz Arena
24 April	Tokyo	Japan	Toyosu Pit
27 April	Seoul	South Korea	KSPO Dome
29 April	Taipei	Taiwan	Convention Center
1 May	Pasay	Philippines	Mall of Asia Arena
3 May	Singapore		The Star Performing Arts Centre
6 May	Hong Kong		AsiaWorld–Expo
8 May	Bangkok	Thailand	Impact Exhibition Hall 5
Leg 5 — Summer festivals
1 June (Note: The concert on 1 June 2019 at Racetrack Służewiec in Warsaw is part of Orange Warsaw Festival.)	Warsaw	Poland	Racetrack Służewiec
6 June (Note: The concert on 6 June 2019 at The Wiltern in Los Angeles is part of Go West Fest.)	Los Angeles	United States	The Wiltern
7 July (Note: The concert on 7 July 2019 at Ruissalo in Turku is part of Ruisrock.)	Turku	Finland	Ruissalo
9 July (Note: The concert on 9 July 2019 at Groos in Grimstad is part of Skral Festival.)	Grimstad	Norway	Groos
19 July (Note: The concert on 19–21 July 2019 at Jakarta International Expo in Jakarta is part of We the Fest.)	Jakarta	Indonesia	Jakarta International Expo
Leg 6 — Oceania
13 September	Auckland	New Zealand	Spark Arena
16 September	Perth	Australia	HBF Stadium
18 September	Adelaide	Australia	Entertainment Centre
20 September	Sydney	Australia	Hordern Pavilion
21 September	Sydney	Australia	Hordern Pavilion
23 September	Brisbane	Australia	BCEC Great Hall
25 September	Melbourne	Australia	Margaret Court Arena
Leg 7 — Asia
25 November	Shenzhen	China	Shenzhen Bay Arena
27 November	Shanghai	China	Mercedes-Benz Arena
30 November	Chengdu	China	Chengdu Magic Cube

=== Cancelled shows ===
List of cancelled concerts, showing date, city, country, venue and reason for cancellation
Date	City	Country	Venue	Reason
7 March 2019	Paris	France	Zénith Paris	Cancelled because of a throat infection.
