= Positive Spin =

Studio album by Gretta Ray
- Released: 18 August 2023
- Length: 44:28
- Label: EMI Music Australia
- Producers: Japanese Wallpaper; Roberto De Sá; Maestro The Baker; Alex Hope; Josh Barber; Evan Klar; Hamish Patrick; Omri Dahan

Gretta Ray chronology
Begin To Look Around (2021)	Positive Spin (2023)	Heartsong (2026)

Singles from Positive Spin
- 1. "Dear Seventeen" Released: 3 May 2023; 2. "Heartbreak Baby" Released: 25 May 2023; 3. "America Forever" Released: 4 July 2023; 4. "Don't Date The Teenager" Released: 3 August 2023; 5. "Roses" Released: 15 March 2024

Positive Spin is the second studio album by Australian singer-songwriter Gretta Ray, released on 18 August 2023 through EMI Music Australia.

On 24 May 2023, Ray hosted a fan event using her official Discord server in the northern suburbs of Melbourne. The activity was a scavenger hunt that guided fans to letters that spelt out the album's name. The album was officially announced a day later, along with a tour titled The Big Pop Show.

The album was nominated for the 2023 Australian Music Prize. At the 2023 J Awards, the album was nominated for Australian Album of the Year.

A deluxe version of the album, titled Positive Spin +, was released on 15 March 2024. It includes reworked versions of the songs "Upgraded" and "Heartbreak Baby", as well as the tracks "Roses" and "Better", a collaboration with Japanese Wallpaper.

== Singles ==
Positive Spin was preceded by four singles; The first was "Dear Seventeen" on 3 May 2023, a letter to her younger self in the beginning of her career, warning her of the perils and joys she's yet to experience. The album's second single, "Heartbreak Baby", which triple j described as "a bubbly pop song that's as full of heart as it is heartbreak", was released on 25 May 2023 alongside its music video."America Forever", which features vocals from Maisie Peters and Carol Ades, was released as a single on 4 July 2023, and the album's final single, "Don't Date The Teenager", was released on 3 August 2023.

"Roses" was released as a single alongside the deluxe version on 13 March 2024. In a press statement, Ray described the song as "warm and optimistic", saying that it "always belonged on a version of Positive Spin".

== Reception ==
Lauren deHollogne from Clash rated the album 8 out of 10 and said that "Positive Spin is melancholic and heartbreaking at times, but its bubbly nature is always there to pick the listener right back up."

Antigoni Pitta from The Line of Best Fit rated the album 6 out of 10 and called the album "a handbook for embracing change in your early 20s", saying that Ray "makes a case for optimism as she joins the ranks of pop artists singing about the trials and tribulations of young womanhood."

Rolling Stone Australia noted the influence of American singer-songwriter Taylor Swift and placed the album at Number 12 on their list of the best Australian albums of 2023 and at 66 in their 100 Best Australian Albums of the 2020s So Far

== Track listing ==
Positive Spin track listing
No.	Title	Writer(s)	Length
1.	"Positive Spin"	Gretta Ray; Alex Hope	3:22
2.	"Upgraded"	Ray; Maestro The Baker	3:33
3.	"Nobody Here"	Ray; Omri Dahan	4:20
4.	"Heartbreak Baby"	Ray; Japanese Wallpaper	3:37
5.	"Dear Seventeen"	Ray	4:11
6.	"Don't Date The Teenager"	Ray; Hailey Collier	3:30
7.	"Loving Somebody"	Ray; Japanese Wallpaper	4:04
8.	"The Cool Boy"	Ray; Japanese Wallpaper; Justin Hayward-Young	3:20
9.	"Can't Keep It Casual"	Ray; Maestro The Baker	3:22
10.	"You've Already Won"	Ray; Evan Klar	3:26
11.	"Light On"	Ray; Japanese Wallpaper	3:36
12.	"America Forever" (with Maisie Peters and Carol Ades)	Ray; Caroline Pennell	4:02
Total length:			44:28

Positive Spin + track listing
No.	Title	Writer(s)	Length
13.	"Roses"	Ray; Japanese Wallpaper	4:02
14.	"Upgraded" (Reimagined)	Ray; Maestro The Baker	3:45
15.	"Heartbreak Baby" (Acoustic)	Ray; Japanese Wallpaper	4:18
16.	"Better" (with Japanese Wallpaper)	Ray; Japanese Wallpaper	4:42
Total length:			61:15

== Charts ==
Chart performance for Positive Spin
Chart (2023)	Peak position
Australian Albums (ARIA)	17

== Release history ==
Release history and formats for Positive Spin
Region	Date	Format	Label	Edition	Ref.
Various	18 August 2023	Digital download; streaming	EMI Music Australia	Standard	
Australia	18 August 2023	CD; 2x LP	EMI Music Australia	Standard	
Various	15 March 2024	Digital download; streaming	EMI Music Australia	Positive Spin + (Deluxe)	
