= Begin to Look Around =

Studio album by Gretta Ray
- Released: 27 August 2021
- Length: 53:28
- Label: EMI Music Australia
- Producers: Kyran Daniel; Roberto De Sá; Dylan Nash

Gretta Ray chronology
Here and Now (2018)	Begin to Look Around (2021)	Positive Spin (2023)

Singles from Begin to Look Around
- 1. "Passion" Released: 4 December 2020; 2. "Bigger Than Me"/"Readymade" Released: 12 March 2021; 3. "Human"/"Passion" Released: 20 May 2021; 4. "Cherish"/"The Brink" Released: 23 July 2021; 5. "Love Me Right" Released: 27 August 2021; 6. "It's Almost Christmas in Philly" Released: 26 November 2021

Begin to Look Around is the debut studio album from Australian singer-songwriter Gretta Ray, released on 27 August 2021 through EMI Music Australia.

The album was announced in May 2021 with Ray saying "This record is a documentation and celebration of the lessons I have learned about love, life and my unremitting passion for music as I've stepped into my early twenties. It is beautiful how much you change your mind throughout those formative years; things can always be seen from a different perspective, and when you're immersed in incredible opportunities that see you travelling the world, falling in and out of love and losing your sense of independence only for it to return stronger than ever before, it is only natural that your view of yourself and the world will be refined when you wake up, and begin to look around."

Ray was set to preview tracks from the album at Oxford Art Factory, Sydney on 24 June 2021 and at The Night Cat, Melbourne on 1 July 2021, but the tour was cancelled due to the COVID-19 pandemic.

At the 2021 ARIA Music Awards, the album was nominated for Breakthrough Artist - Release.

At the J Awards of 2021, the album was nominated for Australian Album of the Year.

In April 2022, Ray announced the Begin To Look Around album tour, which began on 2 June 2022 in Brisbane.

== Singles ==
Begin to Look Around was preceded by four singles; "Passion" in December and three double A-sided singles titled "duologies" which Ray said are "two songs joined in theme but creatively distinct; written from differing perspectives, released as a pair". Those were "Bigger Than Me"/"Readymade" in March 2021, "Human"/"Passion" in May 2021 and "Cherish"/"The Brink" July 2021. The album's fifth single, "Love Me Right" was released on 27 August 2021 alongside its music video. "It's Almost Christmas in Philly" was released as a single on 26 November 2021 for the holiday season, accompanied by an acoustic version of the song and a cover of Joni Mitchell's "River".

== Reception ==
Alex Gallagher from NME Australia said "It's a collection of songs that swerve between euphoric pop gems and open-hearted ballads, blending the two on standouts like the David Le'aupepe-featuring 'Worldly Wise."

Al Newstead from ABC said her debut album establishes her as "a charismatic force in pop" saying "As much as Begin To Look Around is a milestone of Gretta embracing a chart-ready evolution to her sound, it's clearly a coming-of-age record [as] these songs document the turbulent years of Gretta's own life, from 19 to 21, whipping her way around the world, falling in and out of love, and staking her independence and identity not just as a musician, but as a young woman stepping into her early twenties."

== Track listing ==
Begin to Look Around track listing
No.	Title	Writer(s)	Length
1.	"Becoming"	Gretta Ray; Roberto De Sá	0:31
2.	"Bigger Than Me"	Ray; Dylan Nash; Ned Philpot	3:41
3.	"Passion"	Ray; Kyran Daniel	3:39
4.	"Happenstance"	Ray; Laura Welsh; Dan Macdougal	3:39
5.	"Human"	Ray; Philpot; De Sá	3:39
6.	"The Brink"	Ray; Chris Collins	3:40
7.	"Paris"	Ray; Daniel	3:56
8.	"Cherish"	Ray; Nash	3:25
9.	"The Cure"	Ray; Jonny Hokings	3:49
10.	"Readymade"	Ray; Duncan Boyce; De Sá	3:41
11.	"It's Almost Christmas in Philly"	Ray; Boyce; De Sá	3:33
12.	"Worldly-Wise"	Ray; Chris Zane; Jonah Stevens	4:00
13.	"Learning You"	Ray; Daniel; De Sá	4:12
14.	"Love Me Right"	Ray; Matt Hales; Nash	4:19
15.	"Care Less"	Ray; De Sá	3:44
Total length:			53:28

== Charts ==
Chart performance for Begin to Look Around
Chart (2021)	Peak position
Australian Albums (ARIA)	13

== Release history ==
Release history and formats for Begin to Look Around
Region	Date	Format	Label	Catalogue	Ref.
Various	27 August 2021	Digital download; streaming	EMI Music Australia	Not applicable	
Australia	27 August 2021	CD; 2x LP	EMI Music Australia	3809638 / 3809639	
