= Radio Silence =

Radio Silence may refer to:

- Radio silence, a status in telecommunications
- Radio Silence Productions, a trio of filmmakers based in Los Angeles

== Music ==
- Radio Silence (band), a Jamiroquai side project
- Radio Silence (Blue Peter album), 1980
- Radio Silence (Boris Grebenshchikov album), 1989, or the title song
- Radio Silence (Talib Kweli album), 2017
- "Radio Silence", a song by Thomas Dolby from The Golden Age of Wireless
- Radio Silence (James Blake song), from the 2016 album The Colour in Anything
- Radio Silence (Gretta Ray song), from the 2018 EP Here and Now

== Other uses ==
- Radio Silence (novel), a 2016 novel by Alice Oseman
