= Animal (Troye Sivan song) =

Single by Troye Sivan

from the album Bloom
- Released: 9 August 2018
- Genre: Pop
- Length: 4:25
- Label: EMI Australia
- Songwriters: Brett McLaughlin; Josiah Sherman; Ariel Rechtshaid; Troye Sivan Mellet; Jack Latham; Alexandra Hughes
- Producers: Leland; The Haxan Cloak; Ariel Rechtshaid; Buddy Ross (co.); Jam City (co.); Bram Inscore (co.)

Troye Sivan singles chronology
"Dance to This" (2018)	"Animal" (2018)	"1999" (2018)

Audio video
- "Animal" on YouTube

"Animal" is a song by Australian singer-songwriter Troye Sivan. It was written by Sivan, Ariel Rechtshaid, Leland, Jam City, Allie X, Bram Inscore and Josiah Sherman, with production primarily handled by Leland, The Haxan Cloak and Rechtshaid, the latter of whom also worked on "The Good Side". The song was released on 9 August 2018 by EMI Music Australia, as the fifth and final single from Sivan's second studio album, Bloom (2018).

== Background and release ==
Sivan teased the song via Twitter a day in advance of its release. In the short teaser trailer he posted, a silhouetted figure can be seen making hand motions to the background music, before a series of videos of Sivan and his boyfriend Jacob Bixenman is shown. The song's title then flashes on the screen, with release details appearing in a smaller font below. Sivan captioned the obscure teaser: "Last song before the album. Here we go kiddos!" Shortly before the song's release, he teased clips of the song being performed live, describing the song in one of the tweets: "'Animal' is one of my fave songs I've ever written. I wanted to make an epic, timeless love song about how whipped I am." He premiered the song for media and industry executives at the Capitol Records Congress a day before its commercial release.

== Composition ==
"Animal" is an atmospheric, cavernous downtempo pop ballad in which "Sivan traverses love and lust themes". It features "a dark moody ambiance with Sivan enraptured in a seemingly endless infatuation" as well as "brooding electro, synth and drone". Described as a "five-minute 80s stadium love song" by Sivan, "intermittent percussion" culminates throughout the track. It opens with Sivan's "raw vocals and a soft ethereal piano", as it progresses, it builds up to "a crescendo with fuzzy guitars supporting Sivan's selfish yearnings for domesticity", before reaching "John Hughes' movie-like climax with an exhausted love slow dancing in the middle of a high school gymnasium", Paper's Matt Moen wrote. The second half of the song contains a beat change that sonically bears a resemblance to Frank Ocean's 2016 album Blonde. "From the way the synth sharply rises until it's cut with a cassette tape button sound effect to spark the switch-up, to the roomy reverb on Troye's voice with his repeated lyrics "maybe that's you (maybe that's) // maybe that's you" over the distorted beat," Alex Beach wrote for MTV News.

== Critical reception ==
Lake Schatz of Consequence of Sound regarded "Animal" as "a balanced mix of sweet, saccharine, and everything in between". MTV News' Alex Beach opined that the song showcases "Sivan's range of abilities, and genuine, honest emotion in songwriting", calling it "a powerful, emotional confession of how intense his love is for his boyfriend". Tom Breihan of Stereogum wrote: "'Animal' rides some tremendous synth swells while still sounding intimate and scaled-down, and Sivan delivers its majestic chorus with arena-sized panache." Mike Nied of Idolator noted "a striking beauty to the lyrics".

== Personnel ==
Credits adapted from Tidal.

- Leland – production
- The Haxan Cloak – production
- Ariel Rechtshaid – production
- Buddy Ross – co-production
- Jam City – co-production
- Bram Inscore – co-production
- Chris Galland – engineering
- Manny Marroquin – mixing
- Scott Desmarais – record engineering assistance
- Robin Florent – record engineering assistance
- Randy Merrill – master engineering

== Charts ==
Chart performance for "Animal"
Chart (2018)	Peak position
New Zealand Hot Singles (RMNZ)	16
