= Bloom (Troye Sivan album) =

- Standard cover

Studio album by Troye Sivan
- Released: 31 August 2018
- Genres: Pop; dance-pop; synth-pop
- Length: 36:49
- Labels: EMI Australia; Capitol
- Producers: Oscar Holter; Jam City; Bram Inscore; Oscar Görres; Ariel Rechtshaid; Alex Hope; Buddy Ross; Bobby Krlic

Troye Sivan chronology
Blue Neighbourhood (2015)	Bloom (2018)	In a Dream (2020)

Singles from Bloom
- 1. "My My My!" Released: 10 January 2018; 2. "The Good Side" Released: 19 January 2018; 3. "Bloom" Released: 2 May 2018; 4. "Dance to This" Released: 13 June 2018; 5. "Animal" Released: 9 August 2018

Bloom is the second studio album by Australian singer-songwriter Troye Sivan, released on 31 August 2018 through EMI Music Australia and Capitol Records. The album follows up his 2015 debut studio album, Blue Neighbourhood, and features guest appearances from Gordi and Ariana Grande. It was preceded by the release of the singles "My My My!", "The Good Side", "Bloom", "Dance to This" and "Animal".

At the ARIA Music Awards of 2018, the album was nominated for three awards; Album of the Year, Best Male Artist and Best Pop Release.

== Composition ==
Bloom has been called Sivan's "sex album", as well as "darker", "more guitar-driven" and "more danceable" than his previous material. It has also been described as containing material about defiant gay expression; the first song, "Seventeen", is about a sexual experience Sivan had with a man he met on Grindr. Sivan wrote most of the album with American musician Leland and Canadian musician Allie X. The album's production was primarily handled by Bram Inscore, Oscar Görres, Oscar Holter and Ariel Rechtshaid.

== Release and promotion ==
"My My My!" was released as the lead single from the album on 10 January 2018, and was accompanied by a music video directed by Grant Singer. The second single "The Good Side", was released nine days later. It is an acoustic track about a breakup, with Sivan explaining that the song is an open letter to an ex-boyfriend. The title track "Bloom", a song about anal sex, which was promoted by the hashtag "#BopsBoutBottoming" that was trending on Twitter, was released on 2 May as the third single. "Dance to This", featuring American singer Ariana Grande, was released on 13 June as the album's fourth single. The fifth single, "Animal", was released on 9 August. On 14 June, Sivan announced a Target special edition would be released featuring two new songs, "This This" and "Running Shoes". The album was released on 31 August 2018 by EMI Music Australia and Capitol Records.

Sivan promoted the album via the Bloom Tour, which began on 21 September in Irving, Texas, and ended on 30 November 2019 in Chengdu, China.

== Critical reception ==
Professional ratings
Aggregate scores
Source	Rating
AnyDecentMusic?	8.2/10
Metacritic	85/100
Review scores
Source	Rating
AllMusic	4/5 stars
The A.V. Club	B
The Guardian	4/5 stars
The Independent	5/5 stars
The Irish Times	5/5 stars
NME	5/5 stars
The Observer	4/5 stars
Pitchfork	7.5/10
Q	4/5 stars
Rolling Stone	4/5 stars

Bloom received widespread critical acclaim, with critics praising Sivan's openness about his sexuality. At Metacritic, which assigns a normalised rating out of 100 to reviews from mainstream publications, the album has an average score of 85, based on 15 reviews, indicating "universal acclaim".

Giving the album a perfect score, The Independent's Douglas Greenwood wrote, "Making perfect pop isn't easy, but Troye Sivan is a star who's done his homework. With one foot in pop's past and another in its present, Bloom is a record that could turn its considerate maker into one of mainstream music's most revered and fascinating talents." AllMusic critic Neil Z. Yeung stated that "Bloom is an unambiguous statement from Sivan, clear in its intent to celebrate the highs and lows of queer love through the eyes of a proud pop star in the making." Annie Zaleski from The A.V. Club opined that "Bloom's beauty and gifts reveal themselves gradually over time."

Writing for The Guardian, Alexis Petridis stated that "the results are characterful", elaborating: "Bloom is done and dusted in 35 crisp minutes – a time at which some pop albums are reaching their mid-point – and feels like a coherent, artist-led album rather than a bet-spreading collection of songs designed to hit every popular musical base." Brittany Spanos of Rolling Stone said, "Well beyond the already stellar dismissal of heteronormative storylines in pop love stories, Sivan finds a wealth of ways to bring about fresh reflections on age-old themes with undeniable charisma." The Line of Best Fit writer Claire Biddles stated, "Bloom is an exceptional pop album, but maybe more importantly it's a beacon for queer people who struggle to reconcile our neuroses – societal and personal – with our potential for joy and love."

=== Year-end lists ===
Publication	Accolade	Rank	Ref.
Clash	The 40 Best Albums of 2018	29	
The Guardian	The 50 Best Albums of 2018	37	
The Independent	The 40 Best Albums of 2018	12	
NME	Albums of the Year 2018	29	
Paper	Top 20 Albums of 2018	14	
Rolling Stone	The 20 Best Pop Albums of 2018	7	
Slant Magazine	The 25 Best Albums of 2018	4	
Time	The 10 Best Albums of 2018	7	
USA Today	The Best Albums of 2018	—N/a	
PopMatters	The 10 Best Pop Albums of 2018	2	

== Commercial performance ==
Bloom debuted at number three in Australia, making it Sivan's second highest-charting studio album in his home country. It opened at number four on the US Billboard 200 with 72,000 album-equivalent units, including 59,000 pure album sales. It is his highest-charting release and best sales week to date on the Billboard 200.

== Track listing ==
Bloom standard track listing
No.	Title	Writer(s)	Producer(s)	Length
1.	"Seventeen"	Troye Sivan; Brett McLaughlin; Alexandra Hughes; Bram Inscore	Inscore; McLaughlin^{[c]}	3:38
2.	"My My My!"	Sivan; McLaughlin; Oscar Görres; James Alan Ghaleb	Görres	3:24
3.	"The Good Side"	Sivan; McLaughlin; Inscore; Hughes; Jack Latham; Ariel Rechtshaid	Rechtshaid; Inscore; Jam City^{[b]}; McLaughlin^{[c]}	4:28
4.	"Bloom"	Sivan; McLaughlin; Oscar Holter; Peter Svensson	Holter	3:42
5.	"Postcard" (featuring Gordi)	Sivan; Inscore; Sophie Payten	Inscore; McLaughlin^{[c]}	3:36
6.	"Dance to This" (featuring Ariana Grande)	Sivan; McLaughlin; Holter; Noonie Bao	Holter	3:51
7.	"Plum"	Sivan; McLaughlin; Görres; Ghaleb; Hughes	Görres	3:06
8.	"What a Heavenly Way to Die"	Sivan; McLaughlin; Inscore; Hughes	Inscore; McLaughlin^{[c]}	3:07
9.	"Lucky Strike"	Sivan; Alex Hope	Hope	3:28
10.	"Animal"	Sivan; McLaughlin; Inscore; Hughes; Rechtshaid; Latham; Josiah Sherman	Rechtshaid; Inscore^{[a]}; Buddy Ross^{[a]}; Jam City^{[a]}; Leland^{[b]}^{[c]}; Bobby Krlic^{[b]}	4:25
Total length:				36:49

Target (US), HMV (UK) and Japan deluxe edition bonus tracks
No.	Title	Writer(s)	Producer(s)	Length
11.	"This This"	Sivan; McLaughlin; Inscore; Hughes	Inscore	3:33
12.	"Running Shoes"	Sivan; McLaughlin; Michael Uzowuru; Jeff Kleinman	Uzowuru; Kleinman	3:46
Total length:				44:07

LP version – Side A hidden track
No.	Title	Length
6.	"Seventeen (Reprise)"	1:11
Total length:		37:58

Notes

- ^{^[a]} signifies a co-producer
- ^{^[b]} signifies an additional producer
- ^{^[c]} signifies a vocal producer
- The ten tracks from the standard listing are sorted alternatively on Spotify.

== Charts ==
=== Weekly charts ===
Chart (2018)	Peak position
Australian Albums (ARIA)	3
Austrian Albums (Ö3 Austria)	25
Belgian Albums (Ultratop Flanders)	10
Belgian Albums (Ultratop Wallonia)	34
Canadian Albums (Billboard)	13
Czech Albums (ČNS IFPI)	6
Danish Albums (Hitlisten)	21
Dutch Albums (Album Top 100)	16
Finnish Albums (Suomen virallinen lista)	14
German Albums (Offizielle Top 100)	35
Hungarian Albums (MAHASZ)	37
Irish Albums (IRMA)	7
Italian Albums (FIMI)	31
Japanese Albums (Oricon)	118
Japanese Hot Albums (Billboard Japan)	93
New Zealand Albums (RMNZ)	3
Norwegian Albums (VG-lista)	11
Polish Albums (ZPAV)	15
Portuguese Albums (AFP)	20
Scottish Albums (Official Charts)	12
Slovak Albums (SNS IFPI)	11
South Korean Albums (Gaon)	21
Spanish Albums (Promusicae)	13
Swedish Albums (Sverigetopplistan)	15
Swiss Albums (Schweizer Hitparade)	19
UK Albums (Official Charts)	10
US Billboard 200	4

=== Year-end charts ===
Chart (2018)	Position
Australian Albums (ARIA)	97
Australian Artist Albums (ARIA)	18
Chart (2019)	Position
Australian Artist Albums (ARIA)	44

== Certifications ==
Region	Certification	Certified units/sales
Australia (ARIA)	Gold	35,000^{‡}
Canada (Music Canada)	Gold	40,000^{‡}
New Zealand (RMNZ)	Gold	7,500^{‡}
^{‡} Sales+streaming figures based on certification alone.

== Release history ==
Region	Date	Edition	Format	Label	Ref.
Various	31 August 2018	Standard	Digital download; CD; LP	EMI Australia	
United States	31 August 2018	Urban Outfitters limited	LP	Capitol	
United States	31 August 2018	Target exclusive	CD	Capitol	
Japan	31 August 2018	Japan deluxe	CD	Universal Japan	
