= Leland (musician) =

American singer and songwriter (born 1987)

- Born: Brett Leland McLaughlin; July 22, 1987 (age 39)
- Origin: Biloxi, Mississippi, U.S.
- Genres: Pop; R&B; EDM; country
- Occupations: Singer; songwriter
- Years active: 2011–present

Brett Leland McLaughlin (born July 22, 1987) is an American singer and songwriter. Based in Los Angeles, California, he has worked closely with a range of popular artists, including Selena Gomez, Troye Sivan, Daya, Andy Grammer, Kelsea Ballerini and Allie X. In December 2017, McLaughlin signed with Vertigo Berlin/Universal Music Germany for his career as a singer and is currently published by Sony/ATV Music Publishing. Since 2017, he has been the resident songwriter and producer for RuPaul's Drag Race and some of its spin-offs. McLaughlin graduated from Belmont University's School of Music in 2009 with a major in commercial voice.

== Discography ==
=== Soundtrack albums ===
Title	Details
Sierra Burgess Is a Loser (Original Motion Picture Soundtrack)	Released: September 7, 2018; Label: Good Pop, Sony/ATV, Black Label Media, Human Re Sources; Format: digital download, streaming

=== Extended plays ===
Title and details
Catalina (Original Short Film Soundtrack)
- Released: November 18, 2022
- Label: Good Pop
- Formats: digital download, streaming

=== Singles ===
==== As lead artist ====
Title	Year	Album	Label
"Aware"	2015	Non-album singles	House Time, The Orchard
"Full-Time" (featuring Pyramids in Paris and Nevada)	2015	Non-album singles	Formosa
"Mattress" (solo or Valley Girl Remix featuring Allie X)	2017	Non-album singles	Vertigo Berlin
"Run into You"	2018	Non-album singles	Vertigo Berlin
"Run Away with Me" (with Peter Thomas)	2018	Attachment	Self-released
"Middle of a Heartbreak"	2018	Non-album singles	Vertigo Berlin
"Another Lover"	2019	Non-album singles	Vertigo Berlin
"Bad at Letting Go" (solo or with Muna)	2023	Non-album singles	Good Pop

==== As featured artist ====
Title	Year	Album
"I'm a Rapper" (Marcus Butler featuring Brett McLaughlin)	2013	Non-album singles
"Beam Me Up" (Le P featuring Leland)	2015	Non-album singles
"Happy" (Felix Jaehn and Miksu/Macloud featuring Leland and Fourty)	2021	Breathe

=== Guest appearances ===
Title	Year	Other artist(s)	Album
"Sweet Life"	2015	Keljet	Transatlantic

== Television ==
=== RuPaul's Drag Race ===
Leland co-wrote Kardashian: The Musical, as well as the songs "VH1 Divas Live" and "Kitty Girls", which were featured on the ninth season and All Stars 3 of VH1's RuPaul's Drag Race. He was a guest on the sixth episode of All Stars 3, second episode of All Stars 4, twelfth episode of season 12, the seventh episode of All Stars 6 and the seventh episode of Drag Race 18. Leland co-wrote "I'm That Bitch" and "You Think You Know Me" for the first two episodes of the twelfth season.

Leland co-wrote "Break Up (Bye Bye)" and "UK Hun?" for RuPaul's Drag Race UK. He also wrote "Queens Down Under" for RuPaul's Drag Race Down Under.

=== Love, Victor ===
Leland served as executive music producer for the Hulu series Love, Victor, in addition to writing the series' theme song "Somebody Tell Me". He also co-wrote 13 original songs for the series' soundtrack.

=== The Other Two ===
Leland co-wrote "My Brother's Gay" and "Stink", and the theme song for the series The Other Two, which was executive produced by Lorne Michaels and created by Chris Kelly and Sarah Schneider, and aired on Comedy Central.

=== Gayme Show ===
Leland served as executive music producer and composer for Gayme Show on Quibi.

== Films ==
=== Sierra Burgess Is a Loser ===
McLaughlin composed the score, and wrote 11 original songs with Bram Inscore, for the Netflix original movie Sierra Burgess Is a Loser, directed by Ian Samuels and starring Shannon Purser. The film was released on September 7, 2018.

=== Boy Erased ===
McLaughlin composed the theme song "Revelation", featured in the movie and end credits of the film Boy Erased, with Troye Sivan and Jonsi.

== Personal life ==
Leland was born in Biloxi, Mississippi. He is openly gay.

== Songwriting and production credits ==
indicates a song that was released as a single.

Title	Year	Artist(s)	Chart performance										Album
Title	Year	Artist(s)	US	AUS	BEL (FL)	CAN	GER	NED	NZ	SWE	UK	US Club	Album
"Galaxy" (featuring Stan Walker)	2011	Jessica Mauboy	—	13	—	—	—	—	36	—	—	—	Get 'Em Girls
"We Pray for You"	2011	J Rice	—	—	—	—	—	—	—	—	—	—	Non-album singles
"Disappear"	2011	John Flanagan	—	—	—	—	—	—	—	—	—	—	Pretty Lies
"Heartkiller"	2012	Kat Graham	—	—	—	—	—	—	—	—	—	—	Against the Wall
"Trust"	2012	Timomatic	—	—	—	—	—	—	—	—	—	—	Timomatic
"Wall Street"	2014	Neon Hitch	—	—	—	—	—	—	—	—	—	—	Eleutheromaniac
"It's Okay to Cry"	2014	J Rice	—	—	—	—	—	—	—	—	—	—	12
"State of Things"	2014	Matt Simons	—	—	—	—	—	—	—	—	—	—	Catch & Release
"Sanctuary"	2015	Allie X	—	—	—	—	—	—	—	—	—	—	CollXtion I
"1991"	2015	Kat Graham	—	—	—	—	—	—	—	—	—	—	Roxbury Drive
"Going Down Tonight"	2015	Colby O'Donis	—	—	—	—	—	—	—	—	—	—	Non-album singles
"Hide Away"	2015	Daya	23	6	35	18	44	48	15	55	— (Note: "Hide Away" did not enter the Official UK Chart, but did peak at number 6 on the UK Indie Chart.)	—	Daya EP
"Thirsty"	2015	Daya	—	—	—	—	—	—	—	—	—	—	Daya EP
"Legendary"	2015	Daya	—	—	—	—	—	—	—	—	—	—	Daya EP
"U12"	2015	Daya	—	—	—	—	—	—	—	—	—	—	Daya EP
"Back to Me"	2015	Daya	—	—	—	—	—	—	—	—	—	—	Daya EP
"Run Away"	2015	Kat Graham	—	—	—	—	—	—	—	—	—	—	Roxbury Drive
"Don't Wait"	2015	Joey Graceffa	—	—	—	—	—	—	—	—	— (Note: "Don't Wait" did not enter the Official UK Chart, but did peak at number 7 on the UK Indie Chart.)	—	Non-album singles
"No Pressure"	2015	Little Boots	—	—	—	—	—	—	—	—	—	—	Working Girl
"Bite"	2015	Troye Sivan	—	—	—	—	—	—	—	—	—	—	Blue Neighbourhood
"Talk Me Down"	2015	Troye Sivan	—	36	21	—	—	—	— (Note: "Talk Me Down" did not enter the NZ Top 40 Singles Chart, but did peak at number 4 on the New Zealand Heatseekers Chart.)	—	118	—	Blue Neighbourhood
"Youth"	2015	Troye Sivan	23	17	32	47	22	78	23	74	96	1	Blue Neighbourhood
"Lost Boy"	2015	Troye Sivan	—	—	—	—	—	—	—	—	—	—	Blue Neighbourhood
"For Him." (featuring Allday)	2015	Troye Sivan	—	—	—	—	—	—	—	—	—	—	Blue Neighbourhood
"Suburbia"	2015	Troye Sivan	—	—	—	—	—	—	—	—	—	—	Blue Neighbourhood
"Swimming Pools"	2015	Troye Sivan	—	—	—	—	—	—	—	—	—	—	Blue Neighbourhood
"Closure"	2015	Hayley Warner	—	—	—	—	—	—	—	—	—	—	Non-album singles
"Lady & Her Man"	2016	Tiffany	—	—	—	—	—	—	—	—	—	—	A Million Miles
"I'm Famous" (featuring Conor Maynard)	2016	Marcus Butler	—	—	—	—	—	—	—	—	—	—	Non-album singles
"Open Book"	2016	Jacob Whitesides	—	—	—	—	—	—	—	—	—	—	Why?
"All the Rage"	2016	Allie X	—	—	—	—	—	—	—	—	—	—	Non-album singles
"All the Money"	2016	Britt Nicole	—	—	—	—	—	—	—	—	—	—	Britt Nicole
"Girls Night Out"	2016	Britt Nicole	—	—	—	—	—	—	—	—	—	—	Britt Nicole
"I Tried"	2016	J Sutta	—	—	—	—	—	—	—	—	—	—	Feline Resurrection
"Hungover"	2016	Emmalyn	—	—	—	—	—	—	—	—	—	—	Non-album singles
"You Will Find Me"	2016	Alex & Sierra	—	—	—	—	—	—	—	—	—	—	As Seen on TV
"I.C.Y.M.I."	2016	Daya	—	—	—	—	—	—	—	—	—	—	Sit Still, Look Pretty
"Love of My Life"	2016	Daya	—	—	—	—	—	—	—	—	—	—	Sit Still, Look Pretty
"Cool"	2016	Daya	—	—	—	—	—	—	—	—	—	—	Sit Still, Look Pretty
"Got the Feeling"	2016	Daya	—	—	—	—	—	—	—	—	—	—	Sit Still, Look Pretty
"Credit"	2016	Daya	—	—	—	—	—	—	—	—	—	—	Sit Still, Look Pretty
"Next Plane Out"	2016	Daya	—	—	—	—	—	—	—	—	—	—	Sit Still, Look Pretty
"Vowels"	2016	Capital Cities	— (Note: "Vowels" did not enter the Billboard Hot 100, but did peak at number 29 on the US Alternative Airplay Chart.)	—	—	—	—	—	—	—	—	—	Solarize
"Heartbreak Tastes Like Summer"	2016	Jessica Foxx	—	—	—	—	—	—	—	—	—	—	Non-album singles
"Good Time People"	2016	Spencer Ludwig	—	—	—	—	—	—	—	—	—	—	Non-album singles
"No Bad Vibes"	2016	Nicole Millar	—	—	—	—	—	—	—	—	—	—	Communication
"Bad Feeling"	2017	Joy Crookes	—	—	—	—	—	—	—	—	—	—	Influence
"What You Want"	2017	The Heirs	—	—	—	—	—	—	—	—	—	—	Non-album singles
"Paper Love"	2017	Allie X	—	—	—	—	—	—	—	—	—	—	CollXtion II
"Vintage"	2017	Allie X	—	—	—	—	—	—	—	—	—	—	CollXtion II
"Old Habits Die Hard"	2017	Allie X	—	—	—	—	—	—	—	—	—	—	CollXtion II
"That's So Us"	2017	Allie X	—	—	—	—	—	—	—	—	—	—	CollXtion II
"True Love is Violent"	2017	Allie X	—	—	—	—	—	—	—	—	—	—	CollXtion II
"Why"	2017	Sabrina Carpenter	121	—	—	—	—	—	— (Note: "Why" did not enter the NZ Top 40 Singles Chart, but did peak at number 8 on the New Zealand Heatseekers Chart.)	—	—	—	Non-album singles
"Weekend"	2017	Adam Sample	—	—	—	—	—	—	—	—	—	—	Non-album singles
"How You Gon' Do That" (featuring Cara)	2017	Flosstradamus	—	—	—	—	—	—	—	—	—	—	Non-album singles
"Ugly"	2017	Jaira Burns	—	—	—	—	—	—	—	—	—	—	Non-album singles
"There for You" (with Troye Sivan)	2017	Martin Garrix	94	23	19	48	31	11	22	34	40	—	Non-album singles
"Fetish" (featuring Gucci Mane)	2017	Selena Gomez	27	23	2	10	36	49	16	24	33	—	Non-album singles
"Why Did You Lie?"	2017	Carlie Hanson	—	—	—	—	—	—	—	—	—	—	Non-album singles
"Need a Break"	2017	Kodak Black	—	—	—	—	—	—	—	—	—	—	Project Baby 2
"Whole Heart"	2017	Rachel Platten	—	—	—	—	—	—	—	—	—	—	Waves
"Even If It Hurts"	2017	Rachel Platten	—	—	—	—	—	—	—	—	—	—	Waves
"High Rollin"	2017	Jaira Burns	—	—	—	—	—	—	—	—	—	—	Non-album singles
"I Could Never" (featuring Bridesman)	2017	Keljet	—	—	—	—	—	—	—	—	—	—	Non-album singles
"New"	2017	Daya	— (Note: "New" did not enter the Billboard Hot 100, but did peak at number 34 on the US Mainstream Top 40 Chart.)	—	67	—	—	—	—	—	—	—	Non-album singles
"Party Up" (featuring Spencer Ludwig)	2017	Osmo	—	—	—	—	—	—	—	—	—	—	Non-album singles
"Miss Me More"	2017	Kelsea Ballerini	47	—	—	74	—	—	—	—	—	—	Unapologetically
"85"	2017	Andy Grammer	—	—	—	—	—	—	—	—	—	—	The Good Parts
"Workin' on It"	2017	Andy Grammer	—	—	—	—	—	—	—	—	—	—	The Good Parts
"My My My!"	2018	Troye Sivan	80	14	1	57	87	79	25	65	38	1	Bloom
"The Good Side"	2018	Troye Sivan	—	—	—	—	—	—	— (Note: "The Good Side" did not enter the NZ Top 40 Singles Chart, but did peak at number 4 on the New Zealand Heatseekers Chart.)	—	—	—	Bloom
"Ignore Me"	2018	Betty Who	—	—	—	—	—	—	—	—	—	—	Betty
"Sitting on a Secret" (featuring The Cast of RuPaul's Drag Race All Stars, Season 3	2018	RuPaul	—	—	—	—	—	—	—	—	—	—	Non-album singles
"Drag Up Your Life" (featuring The Cast of RuPaul's Drag Race All Stars, Season 3	2018	RuPaul	—	—	—	—	—	—	—	—	—	—	Non-album singles
"Divas Live, Pt. 1"	2018	RuPaul	—	—	—	—	—	—	—	—	—	—	Non-album singles
"Divas Live, Pt. 2"	2018	RuPaul	—	—	—	—	—	—	—	—	—	—	Non-album singles
"Quarter Life Crisis"	2018	Harry Hudson	—	—	—	—	—	—	—	—	—	—	Yesterday's Tomorrow Night
"PharmaRusical"	2018	RuPaul	—	—	—	—	—	—	—	—	—	—	Non-album singles
"Oh God" (featuring Konshens)	2018	Era Istrefi	—	—	—	—	—	—	—	—	—	—	Non-album singles
"All My Issues"	2018	Nicole Millar	—	—	—	—	—	—	—	—	—	—	Excuse Me
"Science"	2018	Allie X	—	—	—	—	—	—	—	—	—	—	Super Sunset
"Bloom"	2018	Troye Sivan	—	34	—	—	—	—	— (Note: "Bloom" did not enter the NZ Top 40 Singles Chart, but did peak at number 1 on the New Zealand Heatseekers Chart.)	—	—	—	Bloom
"Dance to This" (featuring Ariana Grande)	2018	Troye Sivan	115	39	36	85	—	—	— (Note: "Dance to This" did not enter the NZ Top 40 Singles Chart, but did peak at number 1 on the New Zealand Heatseekers Chart.)	98	64	—	Bloom
"Seventeen"	2018	Troye Sivan	—	—	—	—	—	—	—	—	—	—	Bloom
"Plum"	2018	Troye Sivan	—	—	—	—	—	—	—	—	—	—	Bloom
"What a Heavenly Way to Die"	2018	Troye Sivan	—	—	—	—	—	—	—	—	—	—	Bloom
"Animal"	2018	Troye Sivan	—	—	—	—	—	—	— (Note: "Animal" did not enter the NZ Top 40 Singles Chart, but did peak at number 16 on the New Zealand Heatseekers Chart.)	—	—	—	Bloom
"This This"	2018	Troye Sivan	—	—	—	—	—	—	—	—	—	—	Bloom
"Running Shoes"	2018	Troye Sivan	—	—	—	—	—	—	—	—	—	—	Bloom
"Paradise"	2018	Hotshot	—	—	—	—	—	—	—	—	—	—	Early Flowering
"Mood"	2018	Carlie Hanson	—	—	—	—	—	—	—	—	—	—	Non-album singles
"The Other Side"	2018	Betty Who	—	—	—	—	—	—	—	—	—	—	Sierra Burgess is a Loser: OST
"Kid Wonder"	2018	Allie X	—	—	—	—	—	—	—	—	—	—	Sierra Burgess is a Loser: OST
"Half of You"	2018	MNEK	—	—	—	—	—	—	—	—	—	—	Sierra Burgess is a Loser: OST
"The Phone Call"	2018	No Artist	—	—	—	—	—	—	—	—	—	—	Sierra Burgess is a Loser: OST
"Lie for Love"	2018	Sabrina Carpenter	—	—	—	—	—	—	—	—	—	—	Sierra Burgess is a Loser: OST
"Sunflower"	2018	Shannon Purser	—	—	—	—	—	—	—	—	—	—	Sierra Burgess is a Loser: OST
"Sunflower (Reprise)"	2018	Allie X	—	—	—	—	—	—	—	—	—	—	Sierra Burgess is a Loser: OST
"I Don't Change"	2018	KID	—	—	—	—	—	—	—	—	—	—	Sierra Burgess is a Loser: OST
"The Parking Lot"	2018	No Artist	—	—	—	—	—	—	—	—	—	—	Sierra Burgess is a Loser: OST
"Goodbye"	2018	Carlie Hanson	—	—	—	—	—	—	—	—	—	—	Sierra Burgess is a Loser: OST
"End Up With You"	2018	Carrie Underwood	—	—	—	—	—	—	—	—	—	—	Cry Pretty
"1999" (with Troye Sivan)	2018	Charli XCX	— (Note: "1999" did not enter the Billboard Hot 100, but did peak at number 37 on the US Mainstream Top 40 Chart.)	18	32	—	—	—	— (Note: "1999" did not enter the NZ Top 40 Singles Chart, but did peak at number 10 on the New Zealand Hot Singles Chart.)	— (Note: "1999" did not enter the Sweden Singles Chart, but did peak at number 15 on the Sweden Heatseekers Chart.)	13	48	Charli
"Revelation" (with Jónsi)	2018	Troye Sivan	—	—	—	—	—	—	—	—	—	—	Boy Erased: OST
"Toxins"	2018	Carlie Hanson	—	—	—	—	—	—	—	—	—	—	Non-album singles
"Paris"	2018	Sabrina Carpenter	—	—	—	—	—	—	—	—	—	—	Singular: Act I
"Hold Tight" (featuring Uhmeer)	2018	Sabrina Carpenter	—	—	—	—	—	—	—	—	—	—	Singular: Act I
"Errybody Say Love"	2018	The Cast of RuPaul's Drag Race All Stars (season 4)	—	—	—	—	—	—	—	—	—	—	Non-album singles
"Don't Funk It Up"	2018	The Cast of RuPaul's Drag Race All Stars (season 4)	—	—	—	—	—	—	—	—	—	—	Non-album singles
"I'm So Tired..." (with Troye Sivan)	2019	Lauv	81	11	37	57	42	63	9	37	8	—	How I'm Feeling
"Bones" (featuring OneRepublic)	2019	Galantis	—	—	1	—	4	—	— (Note: "Bones" did not enter the NZ Top 40 Singles Chart, but did peak at number 13 on the New Zealand Hot Singles Chart.)	46	—	—	Church
"I Can't Stop Me" (featuring Saweetie)	2019	Sabrina Carpenter	—	—	—	—	—	—	—	—	—	—	Singular: Act II
"Take You Back"	2019	Sabrina Carpenter	—	—	—	—	—	—	—	—	—	—	Singular: Act II
"Spotlight" (featuring Andy Mineo and Swoope)	2019	Andy Grammer	—	—	—	—	—	—	—	—	—	—	Naive
"Me Necesita" (with CNCO)	2019	PrettyMuch	—	—	—	—	—	—	—	—	—	—	INTL:EP
"Cruel"	2019	Jax Jones	—	—	—	—	—	—	—	—	—	—	Snacks (Supersize)
"Quite Miss Home"	2019	James Arthur	—	—	—	—	—	—	— (Note: "Quite Miss Home" did not enter the NZ Top 40 Singles Chart, but did peak at number 15 on the New Zealand Hot Singles Chart.)	—	77	—	You
"Break up Bye Bye"	2019	The Cast of RuPaul's Drag Race UK (series 1)	—	—	—	—	—	—	—	—	35	—	Non-album singles
"Love Me Wrong" (featuring Troye Sivan)	2019	Allie X	—	—	—	—	—	—	—	—	—	—	Cape God
"First Christmas (That I Loved You)" (from Let It Snow)	2019	Shameik Moore	—	—	—	—	—	—	—	—	—	—	Non-album singles
"Rare"	2020	Selena Gomez	30	22	30	21	42	40	28	44	28	—	Rare
"Phenomenon" (featuring Mia Jones)	2020	RuPaul's Drag Race Live!	—	—	—	—	—	—	—	—	—	—	RuPaul's Drag Race Live: The Official Vegas Soundtrack
"Losing is the New Winning"	2020	—	—	—	—	—	—	—	—	—	—		RuPaul's Drag Race Live: The Official Vegas Soundtrack
"Mirror Song"	2020	—	—	—	—	—	—	—	—	—	—		RuPaul's Drag Race Live: The Official Vegas Soundtrack
"I Made It"	2020	—	—	—	—	—	—	—	—	—	—		RuPaul's Drag Race Live: The Official Vegas Soundtrack
"Viva Drag Vegas Runway Mega Mix" (with RuPaul)	2020	—	—	—	—	—	—	—	—	—	—		RuPaul's Drag Race Live: The Official Vegas Soundtrack
"Now I'm Gone"	2020	Andrea Vasquez	—	—	—	—	—	—	—	—	—	—	Love Don't Live Here
"Louder Than Bombs"	2020	BTS	— (Note: "Louder Than Bombs" did not enter the Billboard Hot 100, but did peak at number 4 on the US World Song Chart.)	—	—	—	—	—	—	—	—	—	Map of the Soul: 7
"I'm That Bitch"	2020	RuPaul	—	—	—	—	—	—	—	—	—	—	Non-album singles
"You Don't Know Me"	2020	The Cast of RuPaul's Drag Race Season 12	—	—	—	—	—	—	—	—	—	—	Non-album singles
"Kings & Queens"	2020	Ava Max	13	31	4	26	16	9	— (Note: "Kings & Queens" did not enter the NZ Top 40 Singles Chart, but did peak at number 20 on the New Zealand Hot Singles Chart.)	21	19	—	Heaven & Hell
"Daze Inn"	2020	Carlie Hanson	—	—	—	—	—	—	—	—	—	—	DestroyDestroyDestroyDestroy
"Take Yourself Home"	2020	Troye Sivan	—	91	—	—	—	—	— (Note: "Take Yourself Home" did not enter the NZ Top 40 Singles Chart, but did peak at number 9 on the New Zealand Hot Singles Chart.)	—	—	—	In a Dream
"Uncool" (featuring .Ange.)	2020	Adam Sample	—	—	—	—	—	—	—	—	—	—	TBA
"Man Up"	2020	Hailee Steinfeld	—	—	—	—	—	—	—	—	—	—	Half Written Story
"Someone Else"	2020	Duncan Laurence	—	—	36	—	—	72	—	—	—	—	Worlds on Fire
"I Made It/ Mirror Song/ Losing is the New Winning (Las Vegas Live Medley)"	2020	The Cast of RuPaul's Drag Race, Season 12	—	—	—	—	—	—	—	—	—	—	Non-album singles
"I'm a Drag Queen"	2020	The Cast of RuPaul's Secret Celebrity Drag Race	—	—	—	—	—	—	—	—	—	—	Non-album singles
"I'm in Love"	2020	The Cast of RuPaul's Drag Race: All Stars, Season 5	—	—	—	—	—	—	—	—	—	—	Non-album singles
"Somebody to Tell Me"	2020	Tyler Glenn	—	—	—	—	—	—	—	—	—	—	Songs from "Love, Victor" (Original Soundtrack)
"Athlete"	2020	Greyson Chance	—	—	—	—	—	—	—	—	—	—	Songs from "Love, Victor" (Original Soundtrack)
"God, This Feels Good"	2020	Isaac Dunbar	—	—	—	—	—	—	—	—	—	—	Songs from "Love, Victor" (Original Soundtrack)
"Slow Grenade" (featuring Lauv)	2020	Ellie Goulding	— (Note: "Slow Grenade" did not enter the Hot 100, but peaked at number 31 on the Digital Songs chart.)	—	—	—	—	—	— (Note: "Slow Grenade" did not enter the NZ Top 40 Singles Chart, but peaked at number nine on the NZ Hot Singles Chart.)	—	—	—	Brightest Blue
"Clapback" (featuring The Cast of RuPaul's Drag Race: All Stars, Season 5)	2020	RuPaul	—	—	—	—	—	—	—	—	—	—	Non-album singles
"Warmer"	2020	Rascal Flatts	—	—	—	—	—	—	—	—	—	—	How They Remember You
"Stud"	2020	Troye Sivan	—	—	—	—	—	—	—	—	—	—	In a Dream
"10/10"	2020	Troye Sivan	—	—	—	—	—	—	—	—	—	—	In a Dream
"In a Dream"	2020	Troye Sivan	—	—	—	—	—	—	—	—	—	—	In a Dream
"Bite"	2020	Aaron Carpenter	—	—	—	—	—	—	—	—	—	—	TBA
"Miss America"	2020	Isaac Dunbar	—	—	—	—	—	—	—	—	—	—	Non-album single
"Two Thumbs"	2020	Kiiara	—	—	—	—	—	—	—	—	—	—	Lil Kiiwi
"Fires" (featuring Lil West)	2020	Carlie Hanson	—	—	—	—	—	—	—	—	—	—	DestroyDestroyDestroyDestroy
"Feel Something"	2020	Armin van Buuren and Duncan Laurence	—	—	78	—	—	85	—	—	—	—	Small Town Boy
"Love, or the Lack Thereof"	2020	Isaac Dunbar	—	—	—	—	—	—	—	—	—	—	Evil Twin
"Her Majesty"	2020	Frock Destroyers	—	—	—	—	—	—	—	—	—	—	Frock4Life
"Big Ben"	2020	Frock Destroyers	—	—	—	—	—	—	—	—	—	—	Frock4Life
"Frockatica 1"	2020	Frock Destroyers	—	—	—	—	—	—	—	—	—	—	Frock4Life
"Frockatica 2"	2020	Frock Destroyers	—	—	—	—	—	—	—	—	—	—	Frock4Life
"Fame Whore"	2020	Frock Destroyers	—	—	—	—	—	—	—	—	—	—	Frock4Life
"Frockatica 3"	2020	Frock Destroyers	—	—	—	—	—	—	—	—	—	—	Frock4Life
"FROCK4LIFE"	2020	Frock Destroyers	—	—	—	—	—	—	—	—	—	—	Frock4Life
"How's the Lighting?"	2020	Frock Destroyers	—	—	—	—	—	—	—	—	—	—	Frock4Life
"Roommates"	2020	Dixie D'Amelio	—	—	—	—	—	—	— (Note: "Roommates" did not enter the NZ Top 40 Singles Chart, but peaked at number 15 on the NZ Hot Singles Chart.)	—	—	—	TBA
"Wingman"	2021	Boys World	—	—	—	—	—	—	—	—	—	—	TBA
"Charger" (Solo or featuring Charli XCX)	2021	Elio	—	—	—	—	—	—	—	—	—	—	Can You Hear Me Now?
"Phenomenon"	2021	The Cast of RuPaul's Drag Race Season 13	—	—	—	—	—	—	—	—	—	—	Non-album single
"UK Hun?"	2021	The Cast of RuPaul's Drag Race UK, Series 2	—	—	—	—	—	—	—	—	27	—	Non-album single
"Lucky" (featuring The Cast of RuPaul's Drag Race Season 13)	2021	RuPaul	—	—	—	—	—	—	—	—	—	—	Non-album single
"Obsessed"	2021	Addison Rae	110	—	—	74	—	—	— (Note: "Obsessed" did not enter the NZ Top 40 Singles Chart, but peaked at number 15 on the NZ Hot Singles Chart.)	—	—	—	TBA
"Gucci Knife" (featuring MASN)	2021	Carlie Hanson	—	—	—	—	—	—	—	—	—	—	TBA
"Stars"	2021	Duncan Laurence	—	—	—	—	—	86	—	—	—	—	Small Town Boy (Deluxe)
"Queens Down Under"	2021	The Cast of RuPaul's Drag Race Down Under, Season 1	—	—	—	—	—	–	—	—	—	—	Non-album singles
"Halftime Headliners"	2021	The Cast of RuPaul's Drag Race All Stars, Season 6	—	—	—	—	—	–	—	—	—	—	Non-album singles
"Show Up Queen"	2021	The Cast of RuPaul's Drag Race All Stars, Season 6	—	—	—	—	—	–	—	—	—	—	Non-album singles
"This Is Our Country"	2021	RuPaul, Tanya Tucker, and The Cast of RuPaul's Drag Race All Stars, Season 6	—	—	—	—	—	–	—	—	—	—	Non-album singles
"B.D.E. (Big Drag Energy)"	2021	The Cast of RuPaul's Drag Race UK, Series 3	—	—	—	—	—	—	—	—	–	—	Non-album singles
"Damn That Man"	2021	The Cast of Queen of the Universe, Season 1	—	—	—	—	—	—	—	—	–	—	Non-album singles
"Girl Power"	2021	The Cast of Queen of the Universe, Season 1	—	—	—	—	—	—	—	—	–	—	Non-album singles
"Back Off, Bitch"	2021	The Cast of Queen of the Universe, Season 1	—	—	—	—	—	—	—	—	–	—	Non-album singles
"Friends Forever"	2021	The Cast of Queen of the Universe, Season 1	—	—	—	—	—	—	—	—	–	—	Non-album singles
"Every Day is a Holiday When You're a Drag Queen"	2021	The Cast of Queen of the Universe, Season 1	—	—	—	—	—	—	—	—	–	—	Non-album singles
"Queen of the Universe"	2021	The Cast of Queen of the Universe, Season 1	—	—	—	—	—	—	—	—	–	—	Non-album singles
"Save a Queen"	2022	The Cast of RuPaul's Drag Race, Season 14	—	—	—	—	—	—	—	—	—	—	Non-album singles
"Welcome to the Moulin Ru"	2022	The Cast of RuPaul's Drag Race, Season 14	—	—	—	—	—	—	—	—	—	—	Moulin Ru! The Rusical!
"Charisma, Uniqueness, Nerve and Talent Interlude"	2022	The Cast of RuPaul's Drag Race, Season 14	—	—	—	—	—	—	—	—	—	—	Moulin Ru! The Rusical!
"Jaloux de Ma Gelée"	2022	The Cast of RuPaul's Drag Race, Season 14	—	—	—	—	—	—	—	—	—	—	Moulin Ru! The Rusical!
"Money Money Money"	2022	The Cast of RuPaul's Drag Race, Season 14	—	—	—	—	—	—	—	—	—	—	Moulin Ru! The Rusical!
"Penniless Writer Interlude"	2022	The Cast of RuPaul's Drag Race, Season 14	—	—	—	—	—	—	—	—	—	—	Moulin Ru! The Rusical!
"Love Medley"	2022	The Cast of RuPaul's Drag Race, Season 14	—	—	—	—	—	—	—	—	—	—	Moulin Ru! The Rusical!
"Duke of Dickington Interlude"	2022	The Cast of RuPaul's Drag Race, Season 14	—	—	—	—	—	—	—	—	—	—	Moulin Ru! The Rusical!
"Covergirl Tango"	2022	The Cast of RuPaul's Drag Race, Season 14	—	—	—	—	—	—	—	—	—	—	Moulin Ru! The Rusical!
"Absinthe Interlude"	2022	The Cast of RuPaul's Drag Race, Season 14	—	—	—	—	—	—	—	—	—	—	Moulin Ru! The Rusical!
"Green Fairy"	2022	The Cast of RuPaul's Drag Race, Season 14	—	—	—	—	—	—	—	—	—	—	Moulin Ru! The Rusical!
"I Choose Myself Interlude"	2022	The Cast of RuPaul's Drag Race, Season 14	—	—	—	—	—	—	—	—	—	—	Moulin Ru! The Rusical!
"Welcome to the Moulin Ru (Reprise)"	2022	The Cast of RuPaul's Drag Race, Season 14	—	—	—	—	—	—	—	—	—	—	Moulin Ru! The Rusical!
"Check My Track Record"	2022	The Cast of RuPaul's Drag Race, Season 14	—	—	—	—	—	—	—	—	–	—	Non-album singles
"Devil"	2022	The Cast of RuPaul's Drag Race, Season 14	—	—	—	—	—	—	—	—	–	—	Non-album singles
"Fighter"	2022	The Cast of RuPaul's Drag Race, Season 14	—	—	—	—	—	—	—	—	–	—	Non-album singles
"I Fell Down (I Got Up)"	2022	The Cast of RuPaul's Drag Race, Season 14	—	—	—	—	—	—	—	—	–	—	Non-album singles
"I Hate People"	2022	The Cast of RuPaul's Drag Race, Season 14	—	—	—	—	—	—	—	—	–	—	Non-album singles
"Titanic"	2022	The Cast of RuPaul's Drag Race All Stars, Season 7	—	—	—	—	—	—	—	—	–	—	Non-album singles
"2gether 4eva"	2022	The Cast of RuPaul's Drag Race All Stars, Season 7	—	—	—	—	—	—	—	—	–	—	Non-album singles
"What I Want"	2022	Muna	—	—	—	—	—	—	—	—	–	—	Muna
"Smoke Slow"	2022	Joshua Bassett	—	—	—	—	—	—	—	—	–	—	Sad Songs in a Hotel Room
"Bosom Buddies"	2022	The Cast of RuPaul's Drag Race Down Under, Season 2	—	—	—	—	—	—	—	—	–	—	Non-album singles
"Come Alive"	2022	The Cast of RuPaul's Drag Race UK, Series 4	—	—	—	—	—	—	—	—	–	—	Non-album singles
"One of Us"	2023	Ava Max	—	—	—	—	—	—	— (Note: "One of Us" did not enter the NZ Top 40 Singles Chart, but peaked at number 31 on the NZ Hot Singles Chart.)	—	–	—	Diamonds & Dancefloors
"Golden Girlfriends"	2023	The Cast of RuPaul's Drag Race, Season 15	—	—	—	—	—	—	—	—	–	—	Non-album singles
"Golden Years"	2023	The Cast of RuPaul's Drag Race, Season 15	—	—	—	—	—	—	—	—	–	—	Non-album singles
"Golden Hips"	2023	The Cast of RuPaul's Drag Race, Season 15	—	—	—	—	—	—	—	—	–	—	Non-album singles
"Wigloose Opening Interlude"	2023	The Cast of RuPaul's Drag Race, Season 15	—	—	—	—	—	—	—	—	–	—	Wigloose: The Rusical!
"Black and White"	2023	The Cast of RuPaul's Drag Race, Season 15	—	—	—	—	—	—	—	—	–	—	Wigloose: The Rusical!
"Black and White Interlude"	2023	The Cast of RuPaul's Drag Race, Season 15	—	—	—	—	—	—	—	—	–	—	Wigloose: The Rusical!
"A Little More Drag Interlude"	2023	The Cast of RuPaul's Drag Race, Season 15	—	—	—	—	—	—	—	—	–	—	Wigloose: The Rusical!
"A Little More Drag"	2023	The Cast of RuPaul's Drag Race, Season 15	—	—	—	—	—	—	—	—	–	—	Wigloose: The Rusical!
"Drag Ball"	2023	The Cast of RuPaul's Drag Race, Season 15	—	—	—	—	—	—	—	—	–	—	Wigloose: The Rusical!
"Drag Ball Interlude"	2023	The Cast of RuPaul's Drag Race, Season 15	—	—	—	—	—	—	—	—	–	—	Wigloose: The Rusical!
"Built on Drag"	2023	The Cast of RuPaul's Drag Race, Season 15	—	—	—	—	—	—	—	—	–	—	Wigloose: The Rusical!
"Wigloose"	2023	The Cast of RuPaul's Drag Race, Season 15	—	—	—	—	—	—	—	—	–	—	Wigloose: The Rusical!
"Over Tonight"	2023	Stacey Ryan	—	—	—	—	—	—	—	—	–	—	I Don't Know What Love Is
"Lotus"	2023	The Cast of RuPaul's Drag Race, Season 15	—	—	—	—	—	—	—	—	–	—	Non-album singles
"It's Giving Fashion"	2023	The Cast of RuPaul's Drag Race, Season 15	—	—	—	—	—	—	—	—	–	—	Non-album singles
"Delusion"	2023	The Cast of RuPaul's Drag Race, Season 15	—	—	—	—	—	—	—	—	–	—	Non-album singles
"Goddess"	2023	The Cast of RuPaul's Drag Race, Season 15	—	—	—	—	—	—	—	—	–	—	Non-album singles
"Money, Success, Fame, Glamour"	2023	The Cast of RuPaul's Drag Race All Stars, Season 8	—	—	—	—	—	—	—	—	–	—	Non-album singles
"Queen of the Universe" (Season 2 Cast Version)	2023	The Cast of Queen of the Universe, Season 2	—	—	—	—	—	—	—	—	–	—	Non-album singles
"T4B (Top 4 Bottom)"	2023	The Cast of Queen of the Universe, Season 2	—	—	—	—	—	—	—	—	–	—	Non-album singles
"This Hot"	2023	The Cast of Queen of the Universe, Season 2	—	—	—	—	—	—	—	—	–	—	Non-album singles
"Gagging for You"	2023	The Cast of Queen of the Universe, Season 2	—	—	—	—	—	—	—	—	–	—	Non-album singles
"Rock Hard"	2023	The Cast of Queen of the Universe, Season 2	—	—	—	—	—	—	—	—	–	—	Non-album singles
"Opening Number	2023	The Cast of RuPaul's Drag Race All Stars (season 8)	—	—	—	—	—	—	—	—	–	—	Joan: The Unauthorized Rusical!
"MGM Queen"	2023	The Cast of RuPaul's Drag Race All Stars (season 8)	—	—	—	—	—	—	—	—	–	—	Joan: The Unauthorized Rusical!
"Interlude1"	2023	The Cast of RuPaul's Drag Race All Stars (season 8)	—	—	—	—	—	—	—	—	–	—	Joan: The Unauthorized Rusical!
"Mommie Dearest"	2023	The Cast of RuPaul's Drag Race All Stars (season 8)	—	—	—	—	—	—	—	—	–	—	Joan: The Unauthorized Rusical!
"Interlude 2"	2023	The Cast of RuPaul's Drag Race All Stars (season 8)	—	—	—	—	—	—	—	—	–	—	Joan: The Unauthorized Rusical!
"No More Wire Hangers"	2023	The Cast of RuPaul's Drag Race All Stars (season 8)	—	—	—	—	—	—	—	—	–	—	Joan: The Unauthorized Rusical!
"Interlude 3"	2023	The Cast of RuPaul's Drag Race All Stars (season 8)	—	—	—	—	—	—	—	—	–	—	Joan: The Unauthorized Rusical!
"Bring Me the ax"	2023	The Cast of RuPaul's Drag Race All Stars (season 8)	—	—	—	—	—	—	—	—	–	—	Joan: The Unauthorized Rusical!
"Interlude 4"	2023	The Cast of RuPaul's Drag Race All Stars (season 8)	—	—	—	—	—	—	—	—	–	—	Joan: The Unauthorized Rusical!
"Let's Go, Joan"	2023	The Cast of RuPaul's Drag Race All Stars (season 8)	—	—	—	—	—	—	—	—	–	—	Joan: The Unauthorized Rusical!
"Interlude 5"	2023	The Cast of RuPaul's Drag Race All Stars (season 8)	—	—	—	—	—	—	—	—	–	—	Joan: The Unauthorized Rusical!
"Not My First Rodeo"	2023	The Cast of RuPaul's Drag Race All Stars (season 8)	—	—	—	—	—	—	—	—	–	—	Joan: The Unauthorized Rusical!
"Hollywood Hag Superstar"	2023	The Cast of RuPaul's Drag Race All Stars (season 8)	—	—	—	—	—	—	—	—	–	—	Joan: The Unauthorized Rusical!
"I'm Still Joan"	2023	The Cast of RuPaul's Drag Race All Stars (season 8)	—	—	—	—	—	—	—	—	–	—	Joan: The Unauthorized Rusical!
"Rush"	2023	Troye Sivan	77	12	—	40	85	47	22	61	22	—	Something to Give Each Other
"I Remember Being Born"	2023	The Cast of RuPaul's Drag Race All Stars (season 8)	—	—	—	—	—	—	—	—	–	—	Non-album singles
"Pay Me In Money"	2023	The Cast of RuPaul's Drag Race All Stars (season 8)	—	—	—	—	—	—	—	—	–	—	Non-album singles
"I Got It Bad"	2023	Addison Rae	—	—	—	—	—	—	— (Note: "I Got It Bad" did not enter the NZ Top 40 Singles Chart, but peaked at number 31 on the NZ Hot Singles Chart.)	—	–	—	AR
"2 Die 4" (featuring Charli XCX)	2023	Addison Rae	—	—	—	—	—	—	— (Note: "2 Die 4" did not enter the NZ Top 40 Singles Chart, but peaked at number 13 on the NZ Hot Singles Chart.)	—	–	—	AR
"BMX Bitches"	2023	The Cast of RuPaul's Drag Race Down Under, Season 3	—	—	—	—	—	—	—	—	–	—	Non-album single
"Rest In Peace"	2023	Duncan Laurence	—	—	—	—	—	—	—	—	—	—	Skyboy
"California Rose"	2023	Duncan Laurence	—	—	—	—	—	—	—	—	—	—	Skyboy
"Anything"	2023	Duncan Laurence	—	—	—	—	—	—	—	—	—	—	Skyboy
"DJ Play a Christmas Song"	2023	Cher	90	45	—	53	62	100	39	—	18	3	Christmas
"Someone for Me"	2024	Kylie Minogue	—	—	—	—	—	—	—	—	–	—	Tension II

== Awards and nominations ==
Year	Organization	Work	Category	Result	Ref
2016	ARIA Music Awards	"Youth"	Song of the Year	Won	
2019	Golden Globe Awards	"Revelation"	Best Original Song	Nominated	
