= Herald (album) =

Studio album by Odette
- Released: 5 February 2021
- Genre: Electronic
- Length: 39:48
- Label: EMI Music Australia
- Producer: Damian Taylor

Odette chronology
To a Stranger (2018)	Herald (2021)	Blink (2026)

Singles from Herald
- 1. "Feverbreak" Released: 14 February 2020; 2. "Dwell" Released: 20 October 2020; 3. "Amends" Released: 8 January 2021; 4. "Trial By Fire" Released: 14 May 2021

Herald is the second studio album by Australian musician Odette, released on 5 February 2021 through EMI Music Australia.

Supported by the singles "Feverbreak", "Dwell", and "Amends" and "Trial by Fire"—Herald debuted and peaked at number 47 on the ARIA Albums Chart.

At the 2021 ARIA Music Awards, the album was nominated for Best Adult Contemporary Album and Best Blues & Roots Album and Eben Ejdne was nominated for Best Cover Art for this release.

An extended version of the album titled Reprise was released on 13 September 2021.

== Background ==
The album follows on three years after Odette's debut album, To a Stranger (2018), which received high critical acclaim and two ARIA Awards nominations in the year of release.

Discussing the album in a press release, Odette stated:

"This album is sort of a nuanced discussion of the positives and the negatives of mental illness and also just being a human being. It talks about the realities of hurting others, the consequences of that, and even more so, it holds me accountable—it holds me to my word."

== Recording ==
Odette collaborated with producer Damian Taylor during recording sessions, who previously produced her debut album.

== Composition ==
The album as a whole discusses themes of transitioning from adolescence to adulthood, and mental health, whilst "Dwell" is "anchored in Odette's own [sic] reflections on grief and the manifestations of emotional negativity."

In an interview with Triple J, Odette described the album as focussed sonically around "a classic scale with electronic elements."

== Release ==
Herald's title and release date were announced on 20 October 2020.

The album was released on 5 February 2021 on CD, LP, digital download, and streaming formats. A bone-coloured edition of the vinyl was also made available exclusively at Australian JB Hi-Fi stores.

== Promotion ==
=== Singles ===
Herald was supported by four singles.

"Feverbreak", a collaboration with Hermitude, was released as the album's lead single on 14 February 2020.

"Dwell" was released as the second single on 20 October 2020.

"Amends" was released as the third single on 8 January 2021.

"Trial by Fire" was serviced to Australian contemporary hit radio as the album's fourth and final single on 14 May 2021.

=== Live performances ===
On 15 November 2020, Odette performed "Dwell" live for Australian live music program The Sound.

On 19 November 2020, Odette performed "Dwell" live on Triple J's Like a Version segment, alongside a cover of AC/DC's "Thunderstruck".

== Critical reception ==
Professional ratings
Review scores
Source	Rating
Exclaim!	3.5/5 stars
The Music	3.5/5 stars

Herald received favourable reviews from music critics.

Exclaim!'s Urbi Khan labelled it a "coming-of-age album". Khan felt that "[Odette] sheds her past self and creates the new out of the ashes".

Guido Farnell from The Music was positive in his review of the album, noting "there is great poetic intent driving her somewhat lovelorn lyrical observations."

=== Mid-year lists ===
Herald on mid-year lists
Publication	List	Rank	Ref.
The Music	The Music's Top 25 Albums of 2021 (So Far)	—N/a	

== Track listing ==
Herald track listing
No.	Title	Writer(s)	Producer(s)	Length
1.	"Herald"	Georgia Sallybanks; Damian Taylor		3:43
2.	"Dwell"	Sallybanks; Natalie Dunn; Jantine Heij; Philip "Pip" Norman	Countbounce	3:17
3.	"Trial by Fire"	Sallybanks; James Malone		4:58
4.	"What I Know Is Not Enough"	Sallybanks; Taylor		5:04
5.	"I Miss You, I'm Sorry"	Sallybanks		3:16
6.	"Foghorn"	Sallybanks		3:08
7.	"Feverbreak" (featuring Hermitude)	Sallybanks; Lucas Dubber; Angus Stuart	Hermitude	4:17
8.	"Amends"	Sallybanks	Taylor	3:31
9.	"Why Can't I Let the Sun Set?"	Sallybanks		2:30
10.	"Wait for You"	Sallybanks		2:39
11.	"Mandible"	Sallybanks; Carter Matschullat		3:25
Total length:				39:48

Herald (Reprise) track listing
No.	Title	Writer(s)	Producer(s)	Length
12.	"Thunderstruck" (Triple J Like a Version)	Angus Young; Malcolm Young		3:19
13.	"Amends" (piano and voice)			3:44
14.	"Herald" (piano and voice)			3:26
15.	"Wait for You" (piano and voice)			2:31
16.	"Why Can't I Let the Sun Set?" (piano and voice)			2:24
17.	"Feverbreak" (featuring Hermitude) (Basenji remix)	Sallybanks; Dubber; Stuart	Hermitude	3:54
18.	"Feverbreak" (featuring Hermitude) (North East Party remix)	Sallybanks; Dubber; Stuart		3:37
19.	"Feverbreak" (featuring Hermitude) (North East Party remix [extended])	Sallybanks; Dubber; Stuart		5:24

== Personnel ==
Musicians

- Odette – vocals (all tracks), programming (1, 4, 8), piano (3, 10)
- Damian Taylor – programming (1, 3, 4, 8)
- Jasper Leak – bass (3)
- Martin Mackerras – clarinet (3, 10), saxophone (3)
- Kelly Pratt – alto saxophone, baritone saxophone, clarinet, flugelhorn, flute, French horn, trumpet (4, 8)
- Tam Altmann – accordion (10)

Technical

- Damian Taylor – production, mixing
- Heba Kadry – mastering
- Rohan Sforcina – engineering assistance (3, 10)
- Chris Mclaughlin – engineering assistance (5, 6, 9, 11)

== Charts ==
Chart performance for Herald
Chart (2021)	Peak position
Australian Albums (ARIA)	47
