= Heartsong =

Studio album by Gretta Ray
- Released: 30 October 2026
- Length: 49:37
- Label: EMI Australia
- Producers: Matt Corby; Gab Strum

Gretta Ray chronology
Positive Spin (2023)	Heartsong (2026)

Singles from Heartsong
- 1. "Swimming, Crying" Released: 12 June 2026; 2. "Heartsong" Released: 28 August 2026; 3. "Every Aching Minute" Released: 30 October 2026

Heartsong is the third studio album by the Australian singer-songwriter Gretta Ray, released on 30 October 2026 through EMI Music Australia. The album debuted at number 11 on the ARIA Charts; her highest charting album to date.

== Background ==
Ray released her second studio album Positive Spin in August 2023 and reached No. 17 on the ARIA Charts. The album received an Australian Music Prize nomination.

In mid-2024, Ray relocated to London. She tells The Guardian "I was going to write another record. It was going to be even more pop. I was going to be bigger; shinier. And then two days into being in the UK, I went to the emergency room" and was diagnosed with Infective endocarditis and returned home to Australia. After months rebuilding her strength with specialist appointments, Ray returned to writing demos about sickness, breakups, grief and recovery which led to a four-week recording session at Matt Corby's Rainbow Valley Studios.

== Reception ==
Grace Kneale from The AU Review rated the album 4/5 calling it "her most assured and introspective" and said "The album is co-produced by Matt Corby and Gab Strum, who Gretta has worked closely with over a number of years. The team created beautiful stripped-back arrangements that sit alongside Gretta's poetic songwriting and warm, intimate vocals.

== Track listing ==
Heartsong track listing
No.	Title	Writer(s)	Length
1.	"Heartsong"	Gretta Ray; Matt Corby	3:29
2.	"Every Aching Minute"	Ray	4:51
3.	"Partner in Crime"	Ray	4:32
4.	"Coming Up for Air"	Ray; Robby De Sá	3:40
5.	"Turn Off My Music"	Ray; De Sá	3:35
6.	"Holiday Season"	Ray	4:31
7.	"Never"	Ray; De Sá	2:39
8.	"Please Be Gentle with Me"	Ray; Alex O'Shaughnessy	3:56
9.	"Dreams are Everything Until You Awaken"	Ray	4:27
10.	"Swimming, Crying"	Ray	4:33
11.	"I'll Be There"	Ray; Corby	4:14
12.	"Lucky (In My Life)"	Ray; Gab Strum	5:03
Total length:			49:37

== Personnel ==
Credits are adapted from Tidal.

- Gretta Ray – vocals (all tracks), acoustic guitar (tracks 2, 8, 10, 12), piano (3)
- Matt Corby – production, engineering (all tracks); drum kit (1, 2, 4, 5, 7–9, 11, 12), piano (1, 2, 5, 8, 10–12), background vocals (1, 2, 7, 9, 11, 12), acoustic guitar (1, 3–6, 8), bass guitar (1, 7, 9, 11), electric guitar (2, 4, 6, 7, 11, 12), percussion (2, 7, 11), programming (4, 6, 12), keyboards (8, 11)
- Gab Strum – production (all tracks), keyboards (1, 4, 7, 9, 11, 12), Mellotron (1, 9, 12), engineering (2–7, 9, 11, 12), bass guitar (4–6, 8, 10, 12), Wurlitzer electronic piano (4, 5, 10, 12), piano (4, 6, 9, 12), acoustic guitar (4, 9, 11, 12), electric guitar (4), drum programming (7, 9, 11), synthesizer (7, 9)
- Chris Collins – mixing
- George Georgiadis – maastering
- Jonathan Dreyfus – engineering (1, 2, 5, 6), strings (1, 5, 6)
- Robby De Sá – additional production (2, 3, 5–7, 10), engineering (4, 5, 7, 10), synthesizer (4, 7)
- Josh Barber – engineering (2, 8), orchestral percussion (8)
- Jensen McRae – background vocals, engineering (3)
- Maisie Peters – background vocals (3)
- Joe Rubel – engineering (3)
- David Le'aupepe – background vocals (12)

== Charts ==
Chart performance for Heartsong
Chart (2026)	Peak position
Australian Albums (ARIA)	11
