= Minx =

Minx, MinX or MINX may refer to:

== Music ==
- MINX (band), dissolved South Korean girl group replaced by Dreamcatcher
- MINX (musician) (born 1983), Australian DJ and producer
- Minx (Leatherface album), 1993
- Minx (Toyah album), 1985

== Print ==
- Minx (comics), a DC Comics imprint
- Minx (magazine), a UK magazine

== Other uses ==
- MinX (television), the British TV channel from Chart Show Channels
- Minnie the Minx, a comic strip and character
- The Minx, a 1969 espionage film
- The Minx (1969 film)
- The Minx (2007 film)
- Hillman Minx, a car
- Tiffany Mynx (born 1971)
- Minx (TV series), an American comedy streaming television series

== See also ==
- Mynx vascular closure device
- Slinkee Minx, an Australian dance act
- MINIX, a micro-kernel operating system
- Mink
