= Odette (musician) =

Australian musician (born 1977)

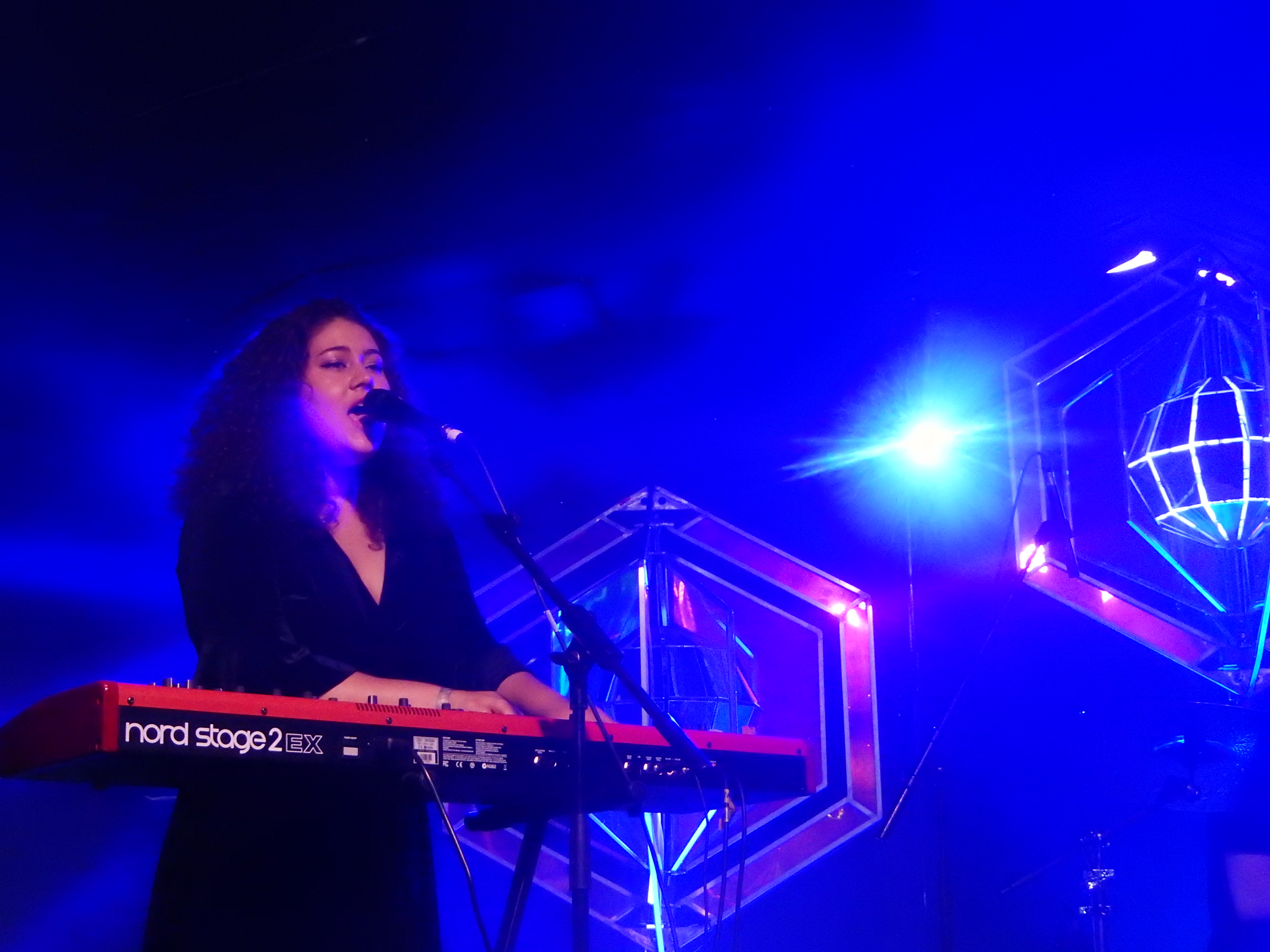
- Odette, Brighton, May 2018

Background information
- Born: Georgia Odette Sallybanks; 1997 (age 28–29); Bath, Somerset, England
- Origin: Sydney, New South Wales, Australia

Georgia Odette Sallybanks (born 1997), who performs as Odette, is an English-born Australian singer-songwriter and musician. Her debut album, To a Stranger (July 2018), peaked at No. 13 on the ARIA Albums Chart. At the ARIA Music Awards of 2018 it was nominated for Best Adult Contemporary Album and Breakthrough Artist – Release.

== Early life ==
Odette was born in Bath, England in 1997 and grew up in inner western Sydney, Australia. Her mother is South African and her father is English-born. She began writing music at approximately eight years old, while attending Haberfield Public School.

== Career ==
=== 2017–2018: To a Stranger ===
In 2017, Odette released her debut single, "Watch Me Read You", a piano ballad incorporating spoken word which she wrote in England in 2015. It peaked at No. 14 on the ARIA Hitseekers Singles Chart.

At the ARIA Music Awards of 2018, Odette was nominated for two awards; Best Adult Contemporary Album and Breakthrough Artist for To a Stranger. Happy Mag's Luke Saunders called the album "a poetic tapestry of melancholy soul and powerful pop ballads." Triple J praised Odette's "canny ability to weave melodic meditations that, like her singing, hover in the space between sensuous composition and spoken-word poetry" throughout the album.

=== 2020–2023: Herald ===
On 20 October 2020, Odette released "Dwell", the second single from her second studio album, Herald, released on 5 February 2021.

In 2023 Odette announced a fifth anniversary tour of To a Stranger, which commenced in July 2023. In a statement, Odette said "Releasing To a Stranger changed my life. It connected me to people who felt the same as I did when I was writing the songs. It was kind of a risky experiment to put my most vulnerable self out there and see what happened and I'm so glad I did it. It's been five years now and my life's trajectory has completely shifted because of it. I'm so excited to be able to tour this record again and honour it and the people who fell in love with the record."

=== 2024–present: Blink ===
In May 2024, Odette released "Reverence", the first new release in three years.

In July 2026, Odette released "Aaah!", the first new music in two years. In August 2026, Odette announced the forthcoming release Blink and headline tour.

== Musical style and influences ==
Odette cites Joanna Newsom, Laura Mvula and her grandfather (a jazz pianist) as musical influences, and poets John Keats and Walt Whitman as lyrical influences.

== Discography ==
=== Studio albums ===
List of studio albums, with release date, label, and selected chart positions shown
Title	Details	Peak chart positions
Title	Details	AUS
To a Stranger	Released: 6 July 2018; Label: EMI Music Australia; Formats: CD, LP, digital download, streaming	13
Herald	Released: 5 February 2021; Label: EMI Music Australia; Formats: CD, LP, digital download, streaming	47
Blink	Released: 6 November 2026; Label: Beloved Records.; Formats: CD, LP, digital download, streaming	tba

=== Extended plays ===
List of EPs, with release date, label, and selected chart positions shown
Title	Details	Peak chart positions
Title	Details	AUS
Offcuts	Released: 8 September 2021; Label: EMI Music Australia; Formats: digital download, streaming	

=== Singles ===
List of singles, with selected certifications
Title	Year	Certifications	Album
"Watch Me Read You"	2017		To a Stranger
"Collide"	2017	ARIA: Gold	To a Stranger
"Take It to the Heart"	2018	ARIA: Gold	To a Stranger
"Lotus Eaters"	2018		To a Stranger
"A Place That I Don't Know" (featuring Gretta Ray)	2018		To a Stranger
"Lights Out" (Jerome Blazé remix)	2019	ARIA: Gold	Non-album single
"Feverbreak" (featuring Hermitude)	2020		Herald
"Dwell"	2020		Herald
"Amends"	2021		Herald
"Trial by Fire"	2021		Herald
"Reverence"	2024		Blink
"Seahorses"	2024		Blink
"Aaah!"	2026		Blink
"Watch Me Go"	2026		Blink
"Don't"	2026		Blink
"Blink"	2026		Blink

=== Other appearances ===
List of non-single appearances
Title	Year	Artist(s)	Album
"I'll Find It"	2020	Alice Ivy featuring Odette	Don't Sleep
"Laisse timber les filles"	2022	So French So Chic	So French So Chic
"Salt"	2023	This Week in the Universe featuring Odette	Non-album single

== Awards and nominations ==
=== ARIA Music Awards ===
The ARIA Music Awards is an annual awards ceremony that recognises excellence, innovation, and achievement across all genres of Australian music.

Year	Nominee / work	Award	Result	Ref.
2018	To a Stranger	Best Adult Contemporary Album	Nominated	
2018	To a Stranger	Breakthrough Artist	Nominated	
2021	Herald	Best Adult Contemporary Album	Nominated	
2021	Eben Ejdne for Herald	Best Cover Art	Nominated	

=== Australian Music Prize ===
The Australian Music Prize (the AMP) is an annual award of $30,000 given to an Australian band or solo artist in recognition of the merit of an album released during the year of award. It commenced in 2005.

Year	Nominee / work	Award	Result
2021	Herald	Australian Music Prize	Nominated
