= Radio Silence (Gretta Ray song) =

Single by Gretta Ray

from the album Here and Now
- Released: 3 August 2018
- Length: 4:16
- Label: Gretta Ray
- Songwriter: Gretta Ray
- Producers: Jono Steer, Leigh Fisher

Gretta Ray singles chronology
"Time" (2018)	"Radio Silence" (2018)	"A Place That I Don't Know" (2018)

"Radio Silence" is a song by Australian musician Gretta Ray, released on 3 August 2018 as the fourth and final single from Ray's debut EP Here and Now (2018). In speaking about the EP, Ray said "'Radio Silence' is pure heartbreak and a heavy sense of guilt."

Ray told the ABC "I have this obsession with this sister song concept. I love writing about the same scenario but from a totally different angle or using a completely different emotion to tell the same story. So, I would say that 'Time' is quite hopeful and optimistic in comparison to 'Radio Silence', yet it's about a very similar scenario." The song was Ray's debut single in the United Kingdom.

At the APRA Music Awards of 2020, the song was nominated for Most Performed Alternate Work of the Year.

In 2021, the song was certified gold in Australia.

== Reception ==
Al Newstead from ABC called it "a gorgeous song that sweeps you up in its mix of apology and personal advice" saying "it would make for the perfect soundtrack to a climactic break-up scene in a high school TV series".

James Roriston from Frty Fve said "More overtly pop than her previous releases such as 'Drive', 'Radio Silence' enjoys layered backing vocals with subtle electronic echoes."

== Certifications ==
Region	Certification	Certified units/sales
Australia (ARIA)	Gold	35,000^{‡}
^{‡} Sales+streaming figures based on certification alone.
