= The Good Side =

Single by Troye Sivan

from the album Bloom
- Released: 19 January 2018
- Length: 4:28
- Label: EMI Australia; Capitol
- Songwriters: Troye Sivan Mellet; Brett McLaughlin; Bram Inscore; Alexandra Hughes; Jack Latham; Ariel Rechtshaid
- Producers: Ariel Rechshaid; Bram Inscore; Jam City (add.)

Troye Sivan singles chronology
"My My My!" (2018)	"The Good Side" (2018)	"Strawberries & Cigarettes" (2018)

Audio video
- "The Good Side" on YouTube

"The Good Side" is a song by Australian singer-songwriter Troye Sivan. It was written by Sivan, Leland, Allie X, Bram Inscore, Jam City and Ariel Rechtshaid, with production handled by the latter three. The song was released through EMI Music Australia on 19 January 2018, as the second single from his second studio album, Bloom (2018).

== Background ==
On 17 January 2018, Sivan announced the single and revealed its artwork on social media. Talking about the song to Zane Lowe on Beats 1, Sivan explained that the song is an open letter to an ex-boyfriend. He said that the song is "a little rough" and called it "one of the only sad songs on the album". He continued: "It's basically about a breakup that I went through a while ago. You know, in a breakup, I think just the sheer nature of it, is that someone is going to get it rough. And I happened to be on the good side of things — I got to go on tour, I got to go and see the world, I had this very therapeutic experience of singing songs about that breakup and watching people sing them back to me, and I met someone new fairly soon afterwards. It's sort of a letter to that person to express apologies and sympathy and if I could change this at all, I would've. So I'm hoping that this song, a couple years down the line, is going to serve as a cathartic experience for the both of us to be like, 'look, this is the way that things happened and whenever we're ready to move on, let's do that.'" Sivan wrote in a tweet that the song "means the world to [him]". He thanked co-writers of the song for "understanding the nuances and complexities of the moment and for helping bring it to life".

== Critical reception ==
Upon release, the song received universal acclaim. Madeline Roth of MTV News called the song an "emotional guitar ballad" that is "punctuated by scintillating harps and late-arriving synths". She warned readers that it is "sure to put you deep in your feelings" as it "tells the story of a failed relationship in which Sivan got 'the good side' of the breakup". Ross McNeilage of the same publication called it "a stunning song of heartbreak and healing", naming it "the most acoustic thing Troye has ever released" and "his most cinematic song to date". He also wrote that it is "a song of two extremes in every sense", due to the presence of guitars in "his dreamy electro-synth universe". Rachel George of Billboard regarded the song as a "guitar-infused ballad with lovely late-arriving synths".

Comparing to the lead single from the album, "My My My!", Brittany Spanos of Rolling Stone found the song offers a "much softer taste". He called it a "tender, acoustic song" in which "Sivan channels Sufjan Stevens' sorrowful balladry". Hugh McIntyre of Fuse sees Sivan taking a different direction in this song. He wrote: "The tune relies on acoustic guitar and perfectly-penned lyrics, as opposed to lush electro-pop production like on 'My, My, My' and previous hits like 'Wild' and 'Youth.'" Hilton Dresden of Paper described the song as "soft, gentle, and comforting", in contrast to the "synth-heavy, jubilant verses" of "My My My!". Similarly, Chris Thomas of Out felt that the song is "vastly different from the dance-heavy 'My My My'", writing that it is "the kind of song you'll play with your lover in the morning". Daniel Megarry of Gay Times also found Sivan departing from "the euphoric, danceable sound of 'My, My, My!'" on the "deeply personal track". Mike Nied of Idolator opined that the song "offers a more introspective look at the end of a relationship and showcases his maturing lyricism" and "showcases a more raw side of Troye's musicality". He sees the singer ditching "traditionally glimmering synths" for "somber strings and electronic fuzz". Megan Armstrong of V wrote: "It seemed with 'My My My!' that Sivan couldn't stop the happiness from flooding out of him, which is good news for everybody, but 'The Good Side' offers a counterbalance and shows the growing pop star's range."

== Live performances ==
On 20 January 2018, Sivan performed the song for the first time on Saturday Night Live. It was featured in the setlist of his 2018-19 Bloom Tour.

== Credits and personnel ==
Credits adapted from Tidal and Qobuz.

- Troye Sivan – songwriting
- Leland – songwriting, background vocals, piano
- Bram Inscore – songwriting, production
- Allie X – songwriting, production, background vocals
- Jam City – songwriting, additional production
- Ariel Rechtshaid – songwriting, production
- Chris Galland – mix engineering
- Randy Merrill – master engineering
- Robin Florent – assistant engineering
- Scott Desmarais – assistant engineering
- Greg Leisz – guitar
- Manny Marroquin – mixing

== Charts ==
Chart (2018)	Peak position
New Zealand Heatseekers (RMNZ)	4
Scotland Singles (OCC)	99

== Certifications ==
Region	Certification	Certified units/sales
Australia (ARIA)	Gold	35,000^{‡}
Brazil (Pro-Música Brasil)	Gold	20,000^{‡}
^{‡} Sales+streaming figures based on certification alone.
