= Bloom (Troye Sivan song) =

Single by Troye Sivan

from the album Bloom
- Released: 2 May 2018
- Genre: Pop; dance-pop; synth-pop
- Length: 3:42
- Label: EMI Australia; Capitol
- Songwriters: Troye Sivan Mellet; Peter Svensson; Oscar Holter; Brett McLaughlin
- Producer: Oscar Holter

Troye Sivan singles chronology
"Strawberries & Cigarettes" (2018)	"Bloom" (2018)	"Dance to This" (2018)

Music video
- "Bloom" on YouTube

"Bloom" is a song by Australian singer-songwriter Troye Sivan. Written by Sivan, Peter Svensson, Leland and its producer Oscar Holter, the song was released by EMI Music Australia on 2 May 2018, as the third single from his second studio album of the same name.

== Background and release ==
Sivan first revealed the song in an interview with Popjustice. He described the song as "complete pop. Like: 'Katy Perry Teenage Dream' pop", deeming it "the most subversively queer song on the album".

It's that light, sonically. Lyrically it's a bit more cheeky. It's just a really fun song. I wrote it with Leland and we were dying laughing and just having the best time writing it. Lyrically I think it's the most subversively queer song on the album. That's kind of what makes me like it so much — it's almost like a little inside joke. It's [sonically] very consumable pop music so I can imagine the masses understanding it a little bit more, and that's funny to me. I don't even think it's necessarily the big single or anything like that, but I really hope the song ends up spreading its wings way further than the people who wouldn't normally listen to my music.

In another interview with Dazed, the song was described by the interviewer as "a gay anthem for bottoms", on which Sivan "takes the role of what sounds like the receptive partner losing his virginity". When asked if that is what the song is about, Sivan replied with a wink: "It's 100 per cent about flowers! That's all it is. Call it whatever you wanna call it. I wanna play that song at every Pride."

To promote the single, Sivan launched his own mobile app on 30 April 2018. The app contains a video, in which Sivan can be seen seated on a bed with a male partner sleeping behind him, which was revealed to be his then boyfriend Jacob Bixenman. He then looks at the camera and says, "It's about flowers", before a clip from the song plays in the background. The song's title flashes across the screen, with the release details appearing in a smaller font below. He later posted the same video on social media and YouTube. The app also has cryptic photos of fluorescent, doll-like figures, as seen in the cover art and lyric video.

== Composition ==
"Bloom" is a pop, dance-pop, and synth-pop anthem about queer desire. It starts with "looming, atmospheric synths", before building up to a euphoric chorus which "introduces a sharp, driving snare". As the song progresses, Sivan "moves into a second chorus and rides a wave of sparkling beats to a heady crescendo".

== Chart performance ==
The song reached number thirty-four on the Australian Singles Chart, and number one on the New Zealand Heatseekers Chart. In the UK, it didn't enter the UK Singles Chart but it debuted at number 100 on the biggest singles of midweek list compiled by the Official Charts Company.

== Videos ==
=== Lyric video ===
A lyric video was released alongside the song. The video, animated by the 3D artist Jason Ebeyer, finds an Ex Machina-type simulacrum of Sivan floating in his fantasy land. At the beginning, Sivan sits in a lush garden surrounded by flowers. He then floats through an abandoned warehouse under iridescent lights. Idolator's Mike Nied opined that "the contrast between the natural shapes and the hard lines of the buildings add some depth to the visual, and it definitely leaves a lasting impression".

=== Music video ===
On 6 June 2018, Sivan released a music video for "Bloom" on his YouTube channel. It was directed by Bardia Zeinali and processed in a 4:3 aspect ratio. It shows Sivan posing in drag outfits with flowers, and in a Draco Malfoy-esque ensemble, Greek muse busts and muscled arms flexing.

== Credits and personnel ==
Credits adapted from Tidal.

- Troye Sivan – composition
- Peter Svensson – composition
- Leland – composition, background vocals
- Oscar Holter – composition, production
- Randy Merrill – master engineering
- John Hanes – engineering
- Serban Ghenea – mixing

== Charts ==
Chart (2018)	Peak position
Australia (ARIA)	34
New Zealand Heatseekers (RMNZ)	1
Scottish Singles Sales (Official Charts)	100
South Korea International (Gaon)	23

== Certifications ==
Region	Certification	Certified units/sales
Australia (ARIA)	Platinum	70,000^{‡}
Canada (Music Canada)	Gold	40,000^{‡}
New Zealand (RMNZ)	Gold	15,000^{‡}
^{‡} Sales+streaming figures based on certification alone.
