= Dance to This =

2018 single by Troye Sivan featuring Ariana Grande

Single by Troye Sivan featuring Ariana Grande

from the album Bloom
- Released: 13 June 2018
- Recorded: 1 January 2018
- Genre: Pop; electropop
- Length: 3:51
- Label: EMI Australia; Capitol
- Songwriters: Troye Sivan; Oscar Holter; Brett McLaughlin; Jonnali Parmenius
- Producer: Oscar Holter

Troye Sivan singles chronology
"Bloom" (2018)	"Dance to This" (2018)	"Animal" (2018)

Ariana Grande singles chronology
"No Tears Left to Cry" (2018)	"Dance to This" (2018)	"Bed" (2018)

Music video
- "Dance to This" on YouTube

"Dance to This" is a song by Australian singer-songwriter Troye Sivan, featuring American singer-songwriter Ariana Grande. Written by Sivan, Leland, Noonie Bao and its producer Oscar Holter, the song was released by EMI Music Australia on 13 June 2018 as the fourth single from Sivan's second studio album, Bloom (2018).

== Background ==
Sivan first revealed the song during an interview with Nick Grimshaw on BBC Radio 1 in February. "This was not a planned announcement, but I'm so excited. It sounds exactly like I dreamt it would. [Grande] and I are friends. She's really fun. I said 'would you ever sing on this song?' And she just did it. My favourite thing is not telling people who it is, and then starting to play the song and as soon as she starts to sing, everyone's like 'are you serious?' Her voice is nuts." He wrote on Twitter immediately after the show: "Yes! The rumours are trumours! [Grande] is my pop queen and I can't wait for you guys to hear our song."

Describing the song as a "mellow dance track", Sivan later revealed its title in an interview with GQ Australia. On 11 June 2018, Sivan officially announced the title and release date of the song on social media and teased an 11-second preview the following day. The teaser features a close-up still of Sivan and Grande, whose faces are illuminated by blue lights. He also confirmed that the track would debut on Beats 1 with Zane Lowe. Sivan told Lowe that he was initially nervous to ask Grande to sing on the song. After he sent her the song, Grande replied instantly and excitedly asked when she could work on it. They happened to be working at the same studio that day and they hung out to discuss life and decide on Grande's part in the song. Sivan got the voice demo back from her the next day.

== Composition ==
"Dance to This" is an R&B, pop and electropop song with '80s influences, lined with "muted, shuffling percussion" and a "syncopated, polyrhythmic beat". The song opens with "heavy beats and melodic guitars", before joining "flickering drum machines and feathery synth pads, with the occasional presence of dreamy guitars", eventually building up to "an atmospheric bridge with massive drums". Lyrically, the song is about "that moment when you feel like you've been to enough house parties or events, and staying home making out in the kitchen and cooking dinner sounds like a much, much better alternative", according to Sivan.

== Critical reception ==
Katherine Barner of Complex praised the song, writing: "The two voices are a true match made in dance music heaven and blend beautifully together during the second chorus." She found it "a great candidate for any playlist of summer anthems". In a lukewarm review, Sasha Geffen of Pitchfork regarded the song as "a subtle, low-key affair" rather than "the kind of pop banger that gets blasted at every single Pride party for the rest of the month". She praised the two artists' voices, but noted that the track "doesn't push them to the heights they've achieved separately". She was displeased that Grande mostly serves as a background vocalist, faulting the track for its failure to "justify Grande's sidelining".

== Music video ==
The music video was first teased with a series of pictures via Instagram by Sivan and Grande on 28 June 2018. A teaser for the video was released on 16 July 2018 announcing that the video would premiere on 19 July 2018 at 9 am PST. W magazine described the video as Sivan and Grande "goofily danc[ing] their night away" in a rec room in front of a "disinterested audience decked out in nylon neon-colored '90s sportswear", with the pair continuing to perform the song until all the others present leave. The video is an homage to the 2003 music video for "Pass This On" by Swedish duo The Knife; Sivan stated the video was also inspired by High School Musical, Grease and a "gif of Cher spinning around".

== Credits and personnel ==
Credits adapted from Tidal.

- Troye Sivan – vocals, songwriting
- Ariana Grande – vocals
- Oscar Holter – production, songwriting
- Leland – songwriting
- Noonie Bao – songwriting
- Randy Merrill – master engineering
- John Hanes – engineering
- Serban Ghenea – mixing
- Alfredo Flores – photographer (cover art)

== Charts ==
Chart performance for "Dance to This"
Chart (2018)	Peak position
Australia (ARIA)	39
Belgium (Ultratip Bubbling Under Flanders)	36
Canada Hot 100 (Billboard)	85
Croatia International Airplay (Top lista)	91
Czech Republic Singles Digital (ČNS IFPI)	69
France Downloads (SNEP)	93
Greece (IFPI)	16
Ireland (IRMA)	52
New Zealand Heatseekers (RMNZ)	1
Portugal (AFP)	64
Romania (Airplay 100)	92
Scottish Singles Sales (Official Charts)	38
Slovakia Singles Digital (ČNS IFPI)	66
South Korea International Downloads (Gaon)	45
Sweden (Sverigetopplistan)	98
UK Singles (Official Charts)	64
US Bubbling Under Hot 100 (Billboard)	15

== Certifications ==
Certifications for "Dance to This"
Region	Certification	Certified units/sales
Australia (ARIA)	2× Platinum	140,000^{‡}
Brazil (Pro-Música Brasil)	2× Platinum	80,000^{‡}
Canada (Music Canada)	Platinum	80,000^{‡}
New Zealand (RMNZ)	Platinum	30,000^{‡}
Poland (ZPAV)	Gold	10,000^{‡}
Portugal (AFP)	Gold	5,000^{‡}
United Kingdom (BPI)	Silver	200,000^{‡}
United States (RIAA)	Platinum	1,000,000^{‡}
^{‡} Sales+streaming figures based on certification alone.
