= Drive (Gretta Ray song) =

Single by Gretta Ray

from the album Here and Now
- Released: August 2016
- Length: 5:02
- Label: Gretta Ray

Gretta Ray singles chronology
"Unexpected Feeling" (2016)	"Drive" (2016)	"Unwind" (2016)

Music video
- "Drive" on YouTube

"Drive" is a song by Australian musician Gretta Ray, released in August 2016 as the lead single from Ray's debut EP Here and Now (2018).

In October 2016, the song won first place in the Vanda & Young Global Songwriting Competition.
