= My My My! (Troye Sivan song) =

2018 single by Troye Sivan

Single by Troye Sivan

from the album Bloom
- Released: 10 January 2018
- Recorded: 2017
- Genre: Pop; electropop; synth-pop
- Length: 3:24
- Label: EMI Australia; Capitol
- Songwriters: Troye Sivan Mellet; Brett McLaughlin; Oscar Görres; James Alan Ghaleb
- Producer: Oscar Görres

Troye Sivan singles chronology
"There for You" (2017)	"My My My!" (2018)	"The Good Side" (2018)

Music video
- "My My My!" on YouTube

"My My My!" is a song by Australian singer-songwriter Troye Sivan. It was written by Sivan, Leland, Oscar Görres and James Alan Ghaleb, with production handled by Görres. The song was released via Universal Music Australia on 10 January 2018, as the lead single from his second studio album, Bloom (2018).

At the ARIA Music Awards of 2018, the song was nominated for Song of the Year.

== Background and promotion ==
On 4 January 2018, Sivan teased the song on social media by posting a blank video with the word "my" flickering on the screen. On 5 January, he posted a photo of a Spotify-branded billboard in Times Square, which features a black and white photo of his face and the words "6 days", revealing the song's release date. On 8 January 2018, he unveiled the official artwork of the song, and teased the music video the day after. In the short monochrome clip, he can be seen posing against the wind in an abandoned warehouse.

Sivan stated in a press release, "'My My My!' is a song of liberation, freedom, and love. Throw all inhibition to the wind, be present in your body, love wholeheartedly, move the way you've always wanted to, and dance the way you feel — hopefully even to this song." He revealed in an interview with Zane Lowe on Beats 1 that his relationship with model Jacob Bixenman inspired the optimistic attitude expressed throughout the song. Sivan ultimately landed on "Oh my my my" to sum up his feelings of freedom and "that exhale of relief".

In an interview with Paper, Leland, a co-writer of this song as well as Sivan's long-time collaborator, said of the creation process of the song:

I had flown to Stockholm to write with Troye for the week. The day we wrote 'My My My!' was a rainy and gloomy day. We met in the hotel lobby, got coffees to-go, and did the 15 minute walk to the studio. Those walks to and from the studio became such a sacred time for us. On the way to the studio, we'd talk about what's inspiring us, and on the back we'd reflect on the song we had written and usually play it on one of our iPhone speakers. We also got soup the day we wrote 'My My My!' and it was delicious.

== Critical reception ==
Raisa Bruner of Time felt the song "builds on [Sivan]'s style of breathy, dance-ready tunes". Pitchfork's Jamieson Cox named the song "one of the first great songs of [2018]", while at their Best 100 Song of 2018, the song ranked at the 17th place. NPR's Katie Anastas also praised Sivan's performance, calling it an "infectious celebration of sexual desire" and "his most confident, clearly having fun with his grittier, sexier image", and that he had established himself as a "confident, unapologetically queer icon". Jeff Benjamin of Fuse finds Sivan "embracing more electronic sounds with a grinding, glitchy electro-pop-club production which feels like a graduation from the blend of electronic, pop and R&B on his Blue Neighbourhood album". Mike Nied of Idolator called the song "a romantic mid-tempo", writing that "the dreamy vibes and fierce production could make for a massive radio hit". Justin Moran of Paper sees "an optimistic shift in the tone of Sivan's work" on the track, compared to tracks from the singer's debut album like "Talk Me Down" and "Suburbia".

== Music video ==
The music video was directed by Grant Singer, with a warning in the beginning: "This video may potentially contain seizure triggers for those with photosensitive epilepsy. Viewer discretion is advised." In the visual, Sivan dances in the middle of an empty warehouse and empty city streets. Around the middle of the music video, Sivan is joined by a number of shirtless men in interior settings, which includes porn star and model Brody Blomqvist. The visuals were inspired by scenes from Christina Aguilera's "Dirrty" video, and Sivan said: "In that video, she looks greasy and, like, dirty. I wanted the video to feel really greasy and grimy, like some weird warehouse party." Katie Anastas of WUWM opined that this song's music video "leaves behind the soft colors and innocent images of his 2015 videos and depicts a confident, unapologetically queer icon".

== Live performances ==
On 20 January 2018, Sivan made his debut as a musical guest on Saturday Night Live, as he performed the song live for the first time. The performance was heavily panned. On 31 January 2018, Sivan performed the song on The Ellen DeGeneres Show. Sivan performed the song at the Rose Bowl on 19 May 2018, as the special guest on Taylor Swift's Reputation Stadium Tour.

== Credits and personnel ==
Credits adapted from Tidal.

- Troye Sivan – songwriting
- Leland – songwriting
- Oscar Görres – songwriting, production
- James Alan Ghaleb – songwriting
- Randy Merrill – master engineering
- John Hanes – engineering
- Serban Ghenea – mixing

== Charts ==
=== Weekly charts ===
Chart (2018)	Peak position
Australia (ARIA)	14
Austria (Ö3 Austria Top 40)	58
Belgium (Ultratip Bubbling Under Flanders)	80
Belgium (Ultratip Bubbling Under Wallonia)	1
Bolivia (Monitor Latino)	12
Canada Hot 100 (Billboard)	57
Canada CHR/Top 40 (Billboard)	45
Czech Republic Airplay (ČNS IFPI)	53
Czech Republic Singles Digital (ČNS IFPI)	25
Germany (GfK)	87
Hungary (Stream Top 40)	32
Ireland (IRMA)	32
Mexico Airplay (Billboard)	13
Netherlands (Single Top 100)	79
New Zealand (Recorded Music NZ)	25
Poland Airplay (ZPAV)	72
Portugal (AFP)	58
Scottish Singles Sales (Official Charts)	48
Slovakia Singles Digital (ČNS IFPI)	33
Slovenia (SloTop50)	35
Sweden (Sverigetopplistan)	65
Switzerland (Schweizer Hitparade)	65
UK Singles (Official Charts)	38
US Billboard Hot 100	80
US Dance Club Songs (Billboard)	1
US Pop Airplay (Billboard)	24

=== Year-end charts ===
Chart (2018)	Position
Australia (ARIA)	84
US Dance Club Songs (Billboard)	5

== Certifications ==
Region	Certification	Certified units/sales
Australia (ARIA)	4× Platinum	280,000^{‡}
Brazil (Pro-Música Brasil)	2× Platinum	80,000^{‡}
Canada (Music Canada)	Platinum	80,000^{‡}
Mexico (AMPROFON)	Gold	30,000^{‡}
New Zealand (RMNZ)	Platinum	30,000^{‡}
Poland (ZPAV)	Gold	10,000^{‡}
United Kingdom (BPI)	Silver	200,000^{‡}
United States (RIAA)	Platinum	1,000,000^{‡}
^{‡} Sales+streaming figures based on certification alone.

== Release history ==
Region	Date	Format(s)	Label	Ref.
Various	10 January 2018	Digital download	Universal Australia	
Australia	12 January 2018	Contemporary hit radio	Universal Australia	
United States	23 January 2018	Contemporary hit radio	Capitol	
Italy	26 January 2018	Contemporary hit radio	Universal	
