= Gretta Ray =

Australian indie-pop singer-songwriter

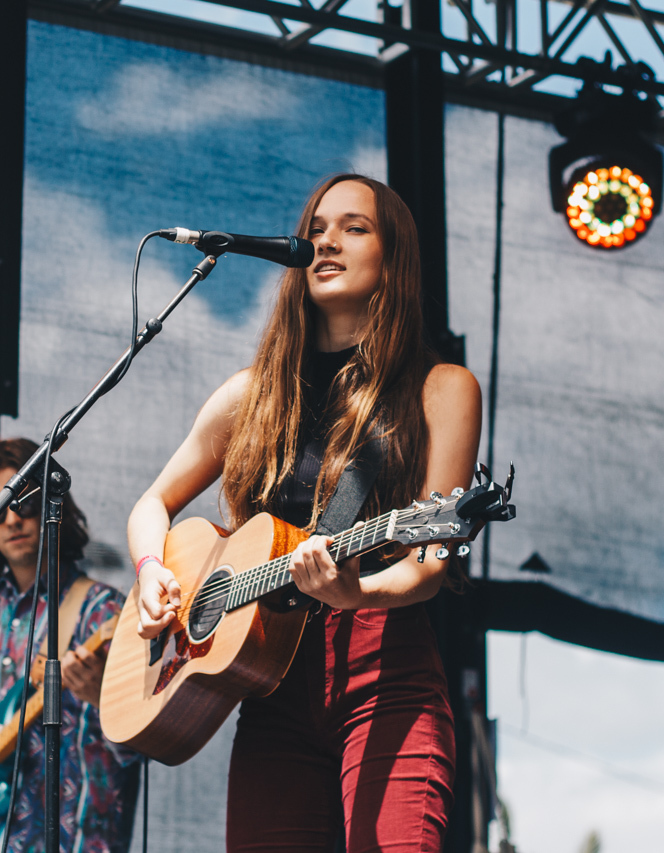
- Ray in 2017

Background information
- Born: Gretta Louise Ray; 22 May 1998 (age 28)
- Origin: Melbourne, Victoria, Australia
- Genres: Indie pop; pop
- Occupations: Singer; songwriter
- Instruments: Vocals; piano; guitar
- Years active: 2016–present
- Label: EMI Music Australia
- Website: www.grettaray.com

Gretta Louise Ray (born 22 May 1998) is an Australian singer-songwriter from Melbourne, Victoria. In 2016, she was the winner of the national Triple J Unearthed radio competition for bands and songwriters, and the 2016 Vanda & Young Global Songwriting Competition, with her song "Drive". To date, Ray has released three studio albums – Begin to Look Around (2021), Positive Spin (2023), and Heartsong (2026) – as well as the EPs Elsewhere (2016) and Here and Now (2018).

Originally making music reflective of indie folk influences, Ray came to embrace pop music as her primary genre with Begin to Look Around. Her songwriting has been described by the Sydney Morning Herald as "conversational, unambiguous lyrics" that "[come] across simply and powerfully", and by Australian music critic Bernard Zuel as "quietly grand pop".

== Early life and education ==
Gretta Ray grew up in Melbourne, Australia, attending Princes Hill Secondary College. She sang in choirs from the age of five, latterly singing and touring with Young Voices of Melbourne, and as the youngest member of If You See Her, Say Hello, a group of 21 Melbourne-based singer-songwriters.

== Career ==
=== 2016–2020: Career beginnings, Elsewhere and Here and Now ===
In February 2016, Ray released her debut EP, Elsewhere. In August 2016, she won the national competition for emerging new artists called Triple J Unearthed High, for her song "Drive", which was produced by Nashville-based Australian music producer Josh Barber with Jonathan Dreyfus, recorded by Nick Edin and Fraser Montgomerey and mixed by US producer Ryan Hewit. The song received high-rotation airplay on Triple J. The announcement was made by Triple J presenters Matt Okine and Alex Dyson, who snuck into a school concert while she was performing to surprise her. Unearthed music director, Dave Ruby Howe called her a "...bold and exciting new talent who seems to win over everyone that comes into orbit of her music". Ray also a nomination for a J Award for Unearthed Artist of the Year at the 2016 J Awards.

On 27 October 2016, Ray won the 2016 edition of the Vanda & Young Global Songwriting Competition, which carries the largest first prize for any songwriting competition in the world. In August 2018, Ray released her second EP titled Here and Now. The following year, Ray released two stand-alone singles: a cover of Bon Iver's "re: Stacks" with Dustin Tebbutt in September, and "Heal You in Time" in December.

=== 2020–2023: Begin to Look Around ===
On 20 May 2021, Ray announced her debut album Begin to Look Around, which was released on 27 August 2021. The album debuted at number 13 on the ARIA Charts. In April 2022, Ray announced the Begin To Look Around album tour, which occurred in June 2022. Later in 2022, Ray joined Gang of Youths on their Australian arena tour in support of their album Angel in Realtime, serving as both their opener and a backing vocalist. The shows also saw Ray duet with lead singer David Le'aupepe on "The Deepest Sighs, the Frankest Shadows", which Ray had previously covered on triple j's Like a Version segment.

=== 2023–2025: Positive Spin ===
On 3 May 2023, Ray released "Dear Seventeen", a song she described as a "focus track" intended to introduce fans to her upcoming release.

On 24 May 2023, Ray held an event in Melbourne's northern suburbs for fans on her official Discord server. The event was a scavenger hunt that led fans to letters which spelled out the name of her sophomore album, Positive Spin, and culminated in its announcement. The album was released on 18 August 2023, and will be followed by a national tour titled The Big Pop Show in September. The album was preceded by the singles "Heartbreak Baby", which was later nominated for Song of the Year at the APRA Awards, "Don't Date the Teenager" and "America Forever", which features vocal contributions from British singer Maisie Peters and American singer Carol Ades.

A deluxe version of the album, titled Positive Spin +, was released on 15 March 2024. It includes reworked versions of the songs "Upgraded" and "Heartbreak Baby", as well as the tracks "Roses" and "Better", a collaboration with Japanese Wallpaper.

In 2024, shortly after moving to London, Ray was diagnosed with infective endocarditis, forcing her to cancel all remaining tour dates for the year.

=== 2026: Return from Illness and "Heartsong" ===
Following a serious illness, Ray released "Swimming, Crying" in June 2026, a song she said "holds that theme of grief that I will continue to explore". On 26 August 2026, Ray announced her third studio album Heartsong while also releasing the titular single from that album. That album was released on 30 October 2026.

== Influences ==
Gretta has cited artists like Joni Mitchell, Missy Higgins, Taylor Swift and Kylie Minogue as her biggest musical influences.

== Discography ==
=== Studio albums ===
List of studio albums, with release date and label shown
Title	Album details	Peak chart positions
Title	Album details	AUS
Begin to Look Around	Released: 27 August 2021; Label: EMI Music Australia; Format: CD, LP, digital download, streaming	13
Positive Spin	Released: 18 August 2023; Label: EMI Music Australia; Format: CD, LP, digital download, streaming	17
Heartsong	Released: 30 October 2026; Label: EMI Music Australia; Format: CD, LP, digital download, streaming	11

=== Extended plays ===
List of EPs, with release date, label, and selected chart positions shown
Title	EP details	Peak chart positions
Title	EP details	AUS
Elsewhere	Released: 16 February 2016; Label: Gretta Ray (independent); Format: CD, digital download, streaming	—
Here and Now	Released: 10 August 2018; Label: Gretta Ray (independent); Format: CD, digital download, streaming	46

=== Singles ===
==== As lead artist ====
List of singles, with year released and album name shown
Title	Year	Certifications	Album
"Unexpected Feeling"	2016		Elsewhere
"Drive"	2016	ARIA: Gold	Here and Now
"Unwind"	2016		Non-album single
"Towers"	2017		Here and Now
"Time"	2018		Here and Now
"Radio Silence"	2018	ARIA: Gold	Here and Now
"Re: Stacks" (with Dustin Tebbutt)	2019		Non-album singles
"Heal You in Time"	2019		Non-album singles
"Better" (with Japanese Wallpaper)	2020		Non-album singles
"Passion"	2020		Begin to Look Around
"Bigger Than Me"/"Readymade"	2021		Begin to Look Around
"Human"/"Passion"	2021		Begin to Look Around
"Cherish"/"The Brink"	2021		Begin to Look Around
"Love Me Right"	2021		Begin to Look Around
"It's Almost Christmas in Philly"	2021		Begin to Look Around
"Vienna"	2022	ARIA: Gold	Non-album singles
"Sweet Disposition" (with Budjerah and Ngaiire)	2022		Non-album singles
"Dear Seventeen"	2023		Positive Spin
"Heartbreak Baby"	2023		Positive Spin
"America Forever" (featuring Maisie Peters and Carol Ades)	2023		Positive Spin
"Don't Date the Teenager"	2023		Positive Spin
"Roses"	2024		Positive Spin +
"Swimming, Crying"	2026		Heartsong
"Heartsong"	2026		Heartsong
"Every Aching Minute"	2026		Heartsong

==== As featured artist ====
List of singles, with year release and album name shown
Title	Year	Album
"Alone" (Noah Earp featuring Gretta Ray)	2016	Disinheritor
"A Place That I Don't Know" (Odette featuring Gretta Ray)	2018	To a Stranger
"Mid Sentence" (Xavier Dunn featuring Gretta Ray)	2020	Non-album singles
"Tous mes copains" (So Frenchy So Chic featuring Gretta Ray)	2022	Non-album singles

== Awards and nominations ==
=== APRA Awards ===
The APRA Awards are held in Australia and New Zealand by the Australasian Performing Right Association to recognise songwriting skills, sales and airplay performance by its members annually. Ray has been nominated for one award.

Year	Nominee / work	Award	Result	Ref.
2020	"Radio Silence"	Most Performed Alternate Work of the Year	Nominated	
2024	"Heartbreak Baby"	Song of the Year	Shortlisted	

=== ARIA Music Awards ===
The ARIA Music Awards is an annual ceremony presented by Australian Recording Industry Association (ARIA), which recognise excellence, innovation, and achievement across all genres of the music of Australia. They commenced in 1987.

Year	Nominee / work	Award	Result	Ref.
2021	Begin to Look Around	Breakthrough Artist	Nominated	

=== Australian Music Prize ===
The Australian Music Prize (the AMP) is an annual award of $30,000 given to an Australian band or solo artist in recognition of the merit of an album released during the year of award. It exists to discover, reward and promote new Australian music of excellence.

Year	Nominee / work	Award	Result	Ref.
2023	Positive Spin	Australian Music Prize	Nominated	

=== J Awards ===
The J Awards are an annual series of Australian music awards that were established by the Australian Broadcasting Corporation's youth-focused radio station Triple J. They commenced in 2005.

Year	Nominee / work	Award	Result	Ref.
2016	Gretta Ray	Unearthed Artist of the Year	Nominated	
2021	Begin to Look Around	Australian Album of the Year	Nominated	
2023	Positive Spin	Australian Album of the Year	Nominated	

=== Music Victoria Awards ===
The Music Victoria Awards are an annual awards night celebrating Victorian music. They commenced in 2006.

Year	Nominee / work	Award	Result	Ref.
2024	Gretta Ray	Best Pop Work	Won	

=== National Live Music Awards ===
The National Live Music Awards (NLMAs) are a broad recognition of Australia's diverse live industry, celebrating the success of the Australian live scene. The awards commenced in 2016.

Year	Nominee / work	Award	Result	Ref.
2017	Herself	Live Blues and Roots Act of the Year	Nominated	

=== Vanda & Young Global Songwriting Competition ===
The Vanda & Young Global Songwriting Competition is an annual competition that "acknowledges great songwriting whilst supporting and raising money for Nordoff-Robbins" and is coordinated by Albert Music and APRA AMCOS. It commenced in 2009.

Year	Nominee / work	Award	Result	Ref.
2016	"Drive"	Vanda & Young Global Songwriting Competition	1st	
