= Here and Now (EP) =

EP by Gretta Ray
- Released: 10 August 2018
- Length: 29:51
- Label: Gretta Ray (independent; AWAL
- Producer: Josh Barber (Note: Tracks 1, 2, 3, 5, 6 and 7); Jonathan Dreyfus (Note: Tracks 1, 3, 5, 6, and 7); Jono Steer (Note: Track 4)

Gretta Ray chronology
Elsewhere (2016)	Here and Now (2018)	Begin to Look Around (2021)

Singles from Here and Now
- 1. "Drive" Released: August 2016; 2. "Towers" Released: 15 March 2017; 3. "Time" Released: 23 April 2018; 4. "Radio Silence" Released: 3 August 2018

Here and Now is the second EP from Australian musician Gretta Ray, released on 10 August 2018 through AWAL.

Here and Now debuted and peaked at number 46 on the ARIA Albums Chart.

== Reception ==
Hayden Davies from Pilerats said:

Here And Now acts a re-cap of kinds for the last two years, covering her growth as a person and a musician since 'Drive' all the way through to the chart-storming heavyweight she is today. From 2017's 'Towers' and this year's highlight 'Time' right through to her latest single, the emotion-driven 'Radio Silence', Here and Now showcases this evolution and adventure through washed-out guitar melodies and Ray's notorious aching vocals, which instantly captivate you the second they float in.

== Track listing ==
All tracks are written by Gretta Ray.

Here and Now track listing
No.	Title	Length
1.	"When We're in Fitzroy"	3:58
2.	"A View Like This"	4:10
3.	"Drive"	5:02
4.	"Radio Silence"	4:18
5.	"Time"	3:49
6.	"Towers"	4:15
7.	"Blue Minded"	4:19
Total length:		29:51

== Personnel ==
Adapted from the EP's liner notes.

=== Musicians ===
- Gretta Ray – writing, vocals (1–7)

Other musicians

- Jonathan Dreyfus – strings, arrangement, performance (1, 7), additional musician (tracks not listed)
- Josh Barber – additional musician (tracks not listed)
- Adam Ollendorff – additional musician (tracks not listed)
- Louis Gill – additional musician (tracks not listed)
- Adam Keafer – additional musician (tracks not listed)
- Shannon Busch – additional musician (tracks not listed)
- Stephen Mowat – additional musician (track not listed)
- Leigh Fisher – additional musician (tracks not listed)
- Simon Rabl – additional musician (tracks not listed)
- Conor Black-Harry – additional musician (tracks not listed)

=== Technical ===
- Josh Barber – production (1–3, 5–7)
- Jonathan Dreyfus – production (1, 3, 5–7)
- Jono Steer – production (4)
- Leigh Fisher – production (4)
- John Castle – mixing 1–2, 4–5, 7)
- Ryan Hewitt – mixing (3, 6)
- Will Duperier – mixing assistance (3, 6)
- Fraser Montgomery – engineering (3, 6)
- Nick Edin – engineering (3, 6)
- Lachlan Carrick at Moose Mastering – mastering (1–7)

=== Artwork and design ===
- Kareena Zerefros – cover portrait (adapted from original photo by Gavin Batty)
- Rory Dewar – packaging design

== Charts ==
Chart performance for Here and Now
Chart (2018)	Peak position
Australia (ARIA)	46

== Release history ==
Release history and formats for Here and Now
Region	Date	Format	Label	Catalogue	Ref.
Various	10 August 2018	Digital download; streaming; CD	Gretta Ray; AWAL	Not applicable	
