= To a Stranger =

Studio album by Odette
- Released: 6 July 2018
- Length: 44:17
- Label: EMI Music Australia
- Producer: Damian Taylor

Odette chronology
To a Stranger (2018)	Herald (2021)

Singles from To a Stranger
- 1. "Watch Me Read You" Released: August 2017; 2. "Collide" Released: November 2017; 3. "Take It to the Heart" Released: 20 April 2018; 4. "Lotus Eaters" Released: October 2018; 5. "A Place That I Don't Know" Released: November 2018

Professional ratings
Review scores
Source	Rating
Beats Per Minute	79%
The Music	3.5/5 stars
The Sydney Morning Herald	3.5/5 stars

To a Stranger is the debut studio album by Australian musician Odette, released on 6 July 2018. The album peaked at number 13 on the ARIA Charts.

At the ARIA Music Awards of 2018, the album was nominated for Best Adult Contemporary Album and Breakthrough Artist.

== Track listing ==
To a Stranger track listing
No.	Title	Length
1.	"Collide"	3:43
2.	"Lights Out"	3:32
3.	"Watch Me Read You"	4:30
4.	"Come Close"	4:16
5.	"Do You See Me"	4:05
6.	"Fractured Glass"	4:22
7.	"Lotus Eaters"	4:34
8.	"Onyx" (featuring Lanks)	4:17
9.	"Take It to the Heart"	3:35
10.	"You"	3:40
11.	"Pastel Walls"	3:43
Total length:		44:17

Digital bonus tracks
No.	Title	Length
12.	"A Place That I Don't Know" (featuring Gretta Ray)	3:05
13.	"Magnolia" (Triple J Like a Version)	3:55
14.	"Angels"	2:39
Total length:		53:56

== Charts ==
Chart performance for To a Stranger
Chart (2018)	Peak position
Australian Albums (ARIA)	13

== Release history ==
Release history for To a Stranger
Country	Date	Format	Label	Catalogue
Australia	6 July 2018	Digital download, CD, LP, streaming	EMI Music Australia	6733874
Europe, UK	8 February 2019	Digital download, CD, streaming		
