= Isaac Dunbar =

American singer-songwriter (born 2003)

- Also known as: Mariposa Extension Number
- Born: March 17, 2003 (age 23); Rhode Island, U.S.
- Genres: Alternative pop; pop
- Years active: 2017–present
- Label: RCA Records
- Website: www.isaacdunbar.com

Isaac Dunbar (born March 17, 2003) is an American singer-songwriter. He signed with RCA Records in 2019.

== Early life ==
Isaac Dunbar was born on March 17, 2003, in Rhode Island.

He is of Italian and Liberian descent. Dunbar's sexuality is unlabeled (confirmed in a TikTok video of his).

Isaac first started making music when he was nine, creating EDM music. As a big Lady Gaga fan, he was further inspired to learn music production when he discovered the music of Madeon (one of the producers working on Gaga's Artpop). He learned synths and music theory through tutorials on YouTube and by reproducing songs from Artpop.

Isaac has stated to be against AI and MAGA. He has also shown support for the movements to free Palestine, Sudan and Congo.

== Career ==
On October 31, 2017, the blog We Are Going Solo reposted his track "Pharmacy", drawing wider attention to his work. In late 2018 his tracks "Freshman Year" (which debuted on The Fader on October 2) and "Blonde" attracted further notice, with an additional boost when "Pharmacy" was featured on Zane Lowe's Beats 1 radio show. On February 12, 2019, Wonderland debuted his single "Mime".

In July 2019 he released his debut EP Balloons Don't Float Here, and Complex premiered his single "Ferrari." In the fall of that year he toured with Girl in Red, and in November he appeared on MTV's PUSH Live concert series.

In October 2019, RCA Records signed him, scheduling his debut on the label, Isaac's Insects, for April 2020. The title track was released in January 2020, and that month he was named to Idolator's list of artists to watch and E!News' "Future Pop Stars You Need to Know Now." Paper then premiered and Billboard featured the followup video for "Makeup Drawer," a track he'd written when he was 14 that had major significance for Isaac as he "explained that he'd been waiting to release this song until he was ready to get honest about his experience with homophobia." Isaac's Insects was released on April 9, 2020.

His U.S. and European tour was set to begin on April 14, 2020, at Moroccan Lounge in Los Angeles, but it was postponed due to the COVID-19 pandemic.

On July 10, 2026, Dunbar was featured in Adam Lambert's new album "ADAM" with the song "RAT CITY".

== Discography ==
=== Extended plays ===
Title	Album details
Balloons Don't Float Here	Released: July 12, 2019; Label: Self-released; Formats: Digital download, streaming
Isaac's Insects	Released: April 9, 2020; Label: RCA; Formats: Digital download, streaming
Evil Twin	Released: February 19, 2021; Label: RCA; Formats: Digital download, streaming, LP (vinyl)
Banish the Banshee	Released: May 27, 2022; Label: RCA; Formats: Digital download, streaming, LP (vinyl)
Beep Beep Repeat	Released: April 26, 2024; Label: RCA; Formats: Digital Download, streaming, LP (vinyl)

=== Singles ===
Title	Year	Album
"freshman year"	2018	Non-album single
"blonde"	2019	balloons don't float here
"mime"	2019	balloons don't float here
"pharmacy"	2019	balloons don't float here
"cologne"	2019	balloons don't float here
"ferrari"	2019	balloons don't float here
"body"	2019	Non-album singles
"onion boy"	2019	Non-album singles
"isaac's insects"	2020	isaac's insects
"makeup drawer"	2020	isaac's insects
"scorton's creek"	2020	isaac's insects
"comme des garçons (like the boys) "	2020	isaac's insects
"God, This Feels Good"	2020	Songs from "Love, Victor" (Original Soundtrack)
"miss america"	2020	Non-album single
"love, or the lack thereof"	2020	evil twin
"intimate moments"	2020	evil twin
"pink party"	2021	evil twin
"fan behavior"	2021	evil twin
"celebrate"	2021	Non-album single
"Bleach"	2022	Banish The Banshee
"Tainted Love"	2022	Banish The Banshee
"Fool's Paradise"	2022	Banish The Banshee
"Apartment A"	2024	Beep Beep Repeat
"Backseat Girl"	2024	Beep Beep Repeat
"American High"	2024	Beep Beep Repeat
"Take It Slow"	2024	Non-album singles
"Late to the Party"	2025	Non-album singles

=== Notes ===
- All extended play titles are stylized in all lowercase, except Banish the Banshee.
- All track titles are stylized in all lowercase, except "God, This Feels Good", "Bleach", "Tainted Love" and "Fool's Paradise".
