= Carlie Hanson =

American singer

- Born: May 18, 2000 (age 26); Onalaska, Wisconsin, U.S.
- Genres: Alt pop
- Occupation: Singer
- Instrument: Vocals
- Years active: 2016–present
- Labels: Warner; Fearless
- Website: www.carliehanson.com

Carlie Hanson (born May 18, 2000) is an American singer. In 2018, she released the song "Only One", which garnered attention after being featured on a playlist curated by Taylor Swift. She released her debut extended play, Junk, in June 2019. This was followed by her 2020 extended play, DestroyDestroyDestroyDestroy. Her debut album, Tough Boy, was released in February 2022. She followed up with her album Wisconsin on March 10, 2023.

== Early life and education ==
Hanson was born and raised in Onalaska, Wisconsin. She was inspired to become a singer by Justin Bieber and, at 14, she and a friend began posting cover songs on YouTube, hoping to follow Bieber's path.

== Career ==
In May 2016, while working as a cashier at McDonald's, Hanson entered a local iHeartRadio contest to see Zayn in concert. As her entry, she recorded a video of herself singing "Pillowtalk" by Zayn while sitting in a parked car outside a shopping mall. She posted the video to Instagram, and it was quickly reposted by iHeart, drawing significant attention. Hanson was subsequently contacted by a talent agent who invited her to Toronto to audition and record for producers from House of Wolf. While in Los Angeles, she worked with songwriter Dale Anthoni. In November 2017, Taylor Swift included Hanson's second single, "Only One", on an Apple Music playlist of her favorite songs. Hanson released a video for the song in March 2018, directed by Similar But Different, who assembled an all-female crew for the shoot. In April 2018, "Only One" was averaging 400,000 streams daily.

In September 2018, Hanson began touring with Troye Sivan and Kim Petras on Sivan's Bloom Tour, playing at venues including Radio City Music Hall in New York and the Greek Theater in Los Angeles. In a review of the Minneapolis show, Twin Cities Media wrote: "She's badass, she’s unapologetic, she’s poppy yet gritty, she's effortlessly cool, her music absolutely bangs, and she’s selfmade. Carlie Hanson is a little bit of Lorde, a little of Billie Eilish meets Kiiara, and a lot of something all her own."

In January 2019, Hanson supported Yungblud on a series of shows in Europe. She then signed with Warner Bros. Records in February 2019, and Primary Wave Music in March 2019. On April 26, 2019, Hanson released "Back in My Arms". The song was later announced to be the lead single from her debut extended play, Junk. On May 24, 2019, she released "WYA", the second single from Junk. Later that day, Taylor Swift added another of Hanson's songs, "Back in My Arms", to her Apple Music playlist. The EP, consisting of five songs, was released on June 7, 2019. In September 2019, she embarked on The WYA Tour across Europe and the United Kingdom.

In November 2019, Hanson released the single "Side Effects". This was followed by other singles including "Daze Inn", "Stealing All My Friends", and "Good Enough". In September 2020, she collaborated with Puerto Rican-American rapper Iann Dior on the song "Ego", and subsequently announced her second extended play, DestroyDestroyDestroyDestroy, which was released on October 23, 2020. The EP was followed by Hanson's debut studio album Tough Boy, released on February 18, 2022. On January 28, 2022, she was featured on a song, titled "Fall Out of Love", which was used for the end credits of the 2022 movie Scream.

== Personal life ==
In 2018, Hanson stated that she does not have a label for her sexuality, but confirmed that she has had relationships with men and women. She has since publicly spoken out about LGBTQ+ rights in the media, including an interview with Subvrt Magazine in 2018 where she voiced her opinion about the importance of LGBTQ+ role models.

== Discography ==
=== Studio albums ===
Title	Details
Tough Boy	Released: February 18, 2022; Label: Warner Bros.; Format: Digital download
Wisconsin	Released: March 10, 2023; Label: Warner Bros.; Format: Digital download

=== Extended plays ===
Title	Details
Junk	Released: June 7, 2019; Label: Warner Bros.; Format: Digital download
DestroyDestroy DestroyDestroy	Released: October 23, 2020; Label: Warner Bros.; Format: Digital download
Too Late To Cry	Released: February 7, 2025; Label: Fearless; Format: Digital download

=== Singles ===
Title	Year	Album
"Why Did You Lie"	2017	Non-album single
"Only One"	2017	Non-album single
"Us"	2018	Non-album single
"Mood"	2018	Non-album single
"Toxins"	2018	Non-album single
"Numb"	2018	Non-album single
"Back in My Arms"	2019	Junk
"WYA"	2019	Junk
"Side Effects"	2019	DestroyDestroy; DestroyDestroy
"Daze Inn"	2020	DestroyDestroy; DestroyDestroy
"Stealing All My Friends"	2020	DestroyDestroy; DestroyDestroy
"Good Enough"	2020	DestroyDestroy; DestroyDestroy
"Ego" (featuring Iann Dior)	2020	DestroyDestroy; DestroyDestroy
"Gucci Knife" (featuring MASN)	2021	Tough Boy
"Off My Neck"	2021	Tough Boy
"Snot" (featuring Deb Never)	2021	Tough Boy
"Fuck Your Labels"	2022	Tough Boy
"608"	2022	Wisconsin
"Illusion"	2022	Wisconsin
"Pretender"	2022	Wisconsin
"Blueberry Pancakes"	2023	Wisconsin
"LSE to LAX"	2023	Wisconsin
"See You Again" (The Chainsmokers, ILLENIUM, & Carlie Hanson)	2023	Non-album single
"Living Feeling Dead"	2023	Non-album single
"Colorado" (Bluey Thomas feat. Carlie Hanson)	2023	Non-album single
"Starting Tomorrow"	2023	Non-album single
"Covering Faces"	2024	Too Late To Cry
"Nutshell"	2024	Too Late To Cry
"Baby"	2024	Too Late To Cry
"Too Late To Cry"	2024	Too Late To Cry
"Take My L"	2025	TBD

=== Music videos ===
Title	Year	Director(s)
"Only One"	2018	Unknown
"Numb"	2019	Nicholas Jandora
"Back in My Arms"	2019	Danilo Parra
"Daze Inn"	2020	Serena Reynolds
"Stealing All My Friends"	2020	Danielle DeGrasse-Alston
"Good Enough"	2020	Christina Xing
"Ego" (featuring Iann Dior)	2020	Ryan Baxley
"Gucci Knife" (featuring MASN)	2021	Nicholas Jandora
"Off My Neck"†	2021	Ryan Baxley
"Snot" (featuring Deb Never)	2021	Lucas Chemotti
"Girls in Line for the Bathroom"	2022	Roxy Sophie Sorkin
"608"	2022	Logan Rice
"Illusion"	2022	Unknown
"Pretender"◊	2022	Logan Rice
"Blueberry Pancakes"◊	2023	Sawyer Brice

† – Official Performance Video.
◊ – Official Visualizer.
