= MINX (musician) =

- Also known as: MINX
- Born: Rachel Phillips; 17 April 1983 (age 43); Sydney, Australia
- Origin: Sydney, Australia
- Genres: Dance, Club, House
- Instrument: Producer
- Years active: 2004–present
- Label: EMI Music Australia
- Website: minxmusic.com.au

MINX (born Rachel Phillips on April 17, 1983, in Sydney) is an Australian DJ and producer. She was formerly signed to EMI Music Australia, which is part of Universal Music Australia. MINX toured the world before she won a national competition aimed at unearthing female DJs, called She Can DJ, in 2011.

Phillips has also performed under the name Rachel May, working in the more melodic side of house music. In 2013 she co-hosted The Weekend on Australian cable TV. She had a radio show on Nova in Adelaide for 2 years in 2007. She co-hosted a travel documentary through South East Asia for Topdeck Travel on Channel V Australia.

== Discography ==
=== EPs ===
Year	Album	Peak positions			Certification
Year	Album	AUS	NZ	US	Certification
2012	Hold On: Date released: October 2014; Record label: EMI	-	–	–	–

=== Singles ===
Year	Singles	Peak positions			Album
Year	Singles	AUS	NZ	US	Album
2012	“You and I"	–	–	–	-
2012	“Taking Chances"	1063	–	–	-
2012	“Night to Remember"	146	–	–	-
2013	“Heaven”	918	–	–	-
2014	“Hold On”	–	–	–	Hold On
