= EMI Music Australia =

Australian subsidiary label of EMI Recordings Ltd.

EMI Recorded Music Australia
- Parent company: Universal Music Group (2013–present); Thorn EMI (1979–1996); EMI (1948–1979, 1996–2013)
- Founded: 1948
- Status: Active
- Genre: Various
- Country of origin: Australia
- Location: Sydney, New South Wales
- Official website: emimusic.com.au

EMI Recorded Music Australia is an Australian imprint of Universal Music Australia. Formerly a subsidiary label of EMI, it was acquired by Universal Music Group via Universal Music Australia in Australia.

Between 1979 and 1996, EMI Music Australia was a subsidiary of Thorn EMI.

It was one of Australia's largest major labels overall until the Universal acquisition in 2012.

Corporate headquarters are located in Sydney, Australia.

== History ==
=== Founding ===
EMI Music Australia has its origins as the local branch of The Gramophone Company in 1925. Together with other labels taken over by RCA Corporation, it became EMI in 1931; in Australia, the local branch was known as The Gramophone Co. (Australia).

From inception, the label used the His Master's Voice trademark, and this continued until the 1970s–1980s. The His Master's Voice trademark had appeared in Australia since the 1910s, as it was seen on British imports from the Gramophone Company (the precursor to EMI).

=== Mid-late 1900s ===
According to Australian music commentator Duncan Kimball, "the vast majority of jazz and dance records released here between the two world wars were by British artists and orchestras." In 1949 the branch was incorporated as EMI (Australia) Pty Ltd and was headquartered in Sydney as a wholly owned subsidiary of United Kingdom's EMI. Due to its house labels, it dominated the Australian market from the mid-1920s to the early 1960s.

By October 1951, EMI Australia's catalogue held over 10,000 titles; the figure comprised 80% of recorded music in the country. In January 1952, EMI announced they were recording major works by Sydney Symphony Orchestra.

=== Early 2000s-Present ===
In 2002, John O'Donnell was named the leader of EMI Music Australia

In 2008, Mark Poston was named the leader of EMI Music Australia.

In 2012, John O'Donnell returned to the label and was appointed Managing Director of EMI Music Australia

In 2022, Mark Holland was appointed Managing Director of EMI Music Australia.

== Current artists ==
- Alison Wonderland
- Bella Taylor Smith
- Birds of Tokyo
- Calum Hood
- Cat & Calmell
- Charley
- Drax Project
- Empire of the Sun
- Gotye
- Gretta Ray
- HEADSEND
- Jada Weazel
- Kate Miller-Heidke
- Keith Urban
- Matthew Ifield
- Meg Mac
- Middle Kids
- Missy Higgins
- Nick Ward
- Paul Dempsey
- Paul Kelly
- Ruby Rodgers
- Siala
- Slim Dusty
- Something for Kate
- Szymon
- Telenova
- The Avalanches
- Troye Sivan

== Former artists ==
Some artists are from EMI Records (UK) or Capitol Music Group (U.S.), but were distributed in Australia via EMI Music Australia.

- 360
- 5 Seconds Of Summer
- AC/DC
- Aaron Carpenter
- Alesso
- Angus & Julia Stone
- Dope Lemon
- Arctic Monkeys
- The Aston Shuffle
- Banks
- Bastille
- Beck
- Beth Ditto
- Birtles & Goble
- Bob Evans
- Brian Wilson
- Calum Scott
- Carrie Underwood
- City Girls
- Crowded House
- Daniel Johns
- Diana Rouvas
- DREAMS
- Elton John
- Emeli Sandé
- Eric Church
- Evan Klar
- FLETCHER
- Freya Ridings
- Glades
- Halsey
- Hey Violet
- Hootie & The Blowfish
- Hot Chip
- Human Buoy
- Illenium
- Jamie McDell
- Jamie T
- Jamiroquai
- Jake Bugg
- Jean Stafford
- Jess Kent
- John Lennon
- Johnny Farnham
- Jonas Blue
- Kasey Chambers
- Katy Perry
- Kian
- Kirin J. Callinan
- KLP
- Ladyhawke
- Leah Mencel
- Liam Payne
- Lil Yachty
- Little River Band
- Loyle Carner
- Luke Bryan
- Maggie Rogers
- Mark Knopfler
- Mary J. Blige
- Metallica
- Miiesha
- MINX
- MNEK
- NF
- Neil Finn
- Niall Horan
- Nicole Millar
- Ninjawerks
- Norah Jones
- Odette
- Oh Mercy
- Olympia
- Paul McCartney
- Pez
- Pond
- Quavo
- Queen
- Rest for the Wicked
- Ricki-Lee
- Robert Forster
- Rosanne Cash
- Ryan Adams
- The Saints
- Sam Bluer
- Sam Smith
- Sarah Blasko
- Sky Ferreira
- Slowthai
- Takeoff
- Tex, Don and Charlie
- The 12th Man
- The Beatles
- The Chemical Brothers
- The Last Shadow Puppets
- The Money War
- The Vamps
- Tina Arena
- Tori Kelly
- Tuka
- VAST
- Vic Mensa
- Wiinston
- Young Bombs

== Compilation Albums ==
EMI Music Australia historically released its own compilations and singles, including those which were mixed by prolific DJs from Australia and occasionally overseas.

== See also ==
- Australian record companies in the 60s
- List of Universal Music Group labels
- List of Universal Music Group artists
- List of EMI artists
- List of EMI labels
- List of record labels
