= Allie X discography =

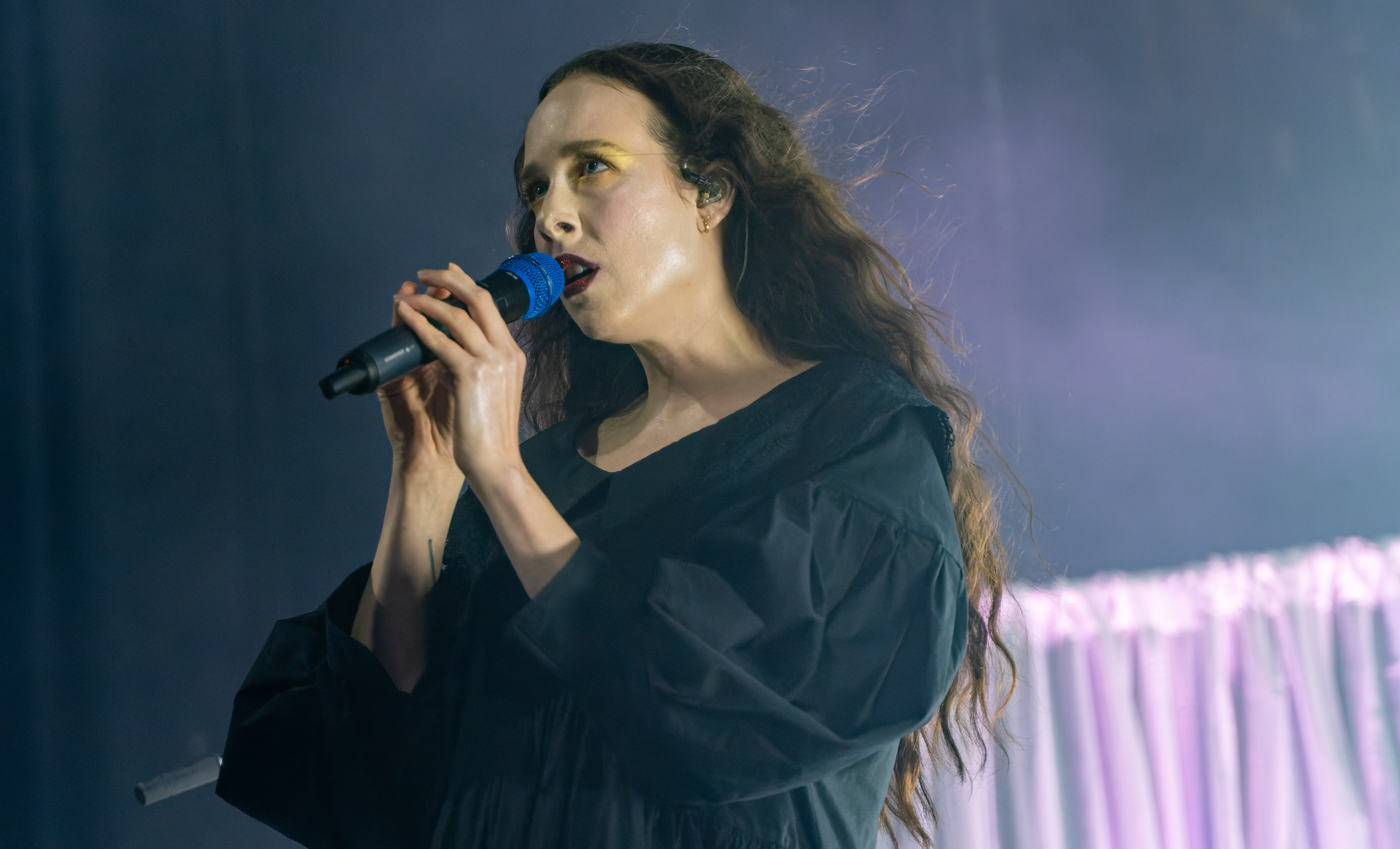
- Allie X performing at Electric Brixton in 2022
- Studio albums: 4
- EPs: 5
- Live albums: 2
- Singles: 31
- Demo albums: 2

The discography of Canadian singer-songwriter Alexandra Hughes, better known as Allie X, consists of four studio albums, two live albums, two independently released demo album, six extended plays, and 31 singles. Hughes began her career in the underground club scene in Toronto, independently releasing the 10-track demo album Waiting for the Prize in 2006. Her debut single under the Allie X name "Catch" was released in 2014, to much critical acclaim. Her debut EP CollXtion I was released on 7 April 2015. After an endorsement from American singer Katy Perry, "Catch" was re-released and began charting in Canada. Hughes spent the next two years working on her debut studio album, releasing numerous singles online to gauge fan reaction. The album, CollXtion II, was released on 9 June 2017 and the singles not included on the project were released as the compilation EP CollXtion II: Unsolved. She released another EP, Super Sunset, on 29 October 2018. Her second studio album Cape God was released on 21 February 2020 and became her first album to chart in the United States.

In addition to her own music, Allie X has written songs for other artists including Troye Sivan, Betty Who, BTS, and Leland.

== Albums ==
=== Studio albums ===
Title	Album details	Peak chart positions			
Title	Album details	SCO	UK Indie	US Cur.	US Heat.
CollXtion II	Released: 9 June 2017; Label: Twin Music, Sony Music Canada; Formats: CD, LP, digital download, streaming	73	40	—	—
Cape God	Released: 21 February 2020; Label: Twin Music, Allie X Canada, AWAL; Formats: CD, LP, digital download, streaming	—	—	73	23
Girl with No Face	Released: 23 February 2024; Label: Twin Music, Allie X Canada, AWAL; Formats: CD, LP, digital download, streaming, cassette	78	13	—	—
Happiness Is Going to Get You	Released: 7 November 2025; Label: Twin Music, Allie X Canada, AWAL; Formats: CD, LP, digital download, streaming	—	33	—	—
"—" denotes a recording that did not chart or was not released in that territory.

=== Compilation albums ===
Title	Details
CollXtion I + II	Released: 5 February 2021; Label: Twin Music; Format: LP

=== Live albums ===
Title	Details
Garage Gigs Live	Released: 23 October 2019; Label: Twin Music, AWAL; Format: Streaming
Cape God (The Digital Concert)	Released: 21 February 2021; Label: Twin Music, AWAL; Format: Digital download, streaming

=== Demo albums ===
Title	Details
Waiting for the Prize	Released: 2006; Label: Independent; Format: CD
Ladies and Gentlemen	Released: 2008; Label: Independent; Format: CD

== Extended plays ==
Title	Details
Allie Hughes	Released: 28 September 2010; Label: Independent; Formats: CD, digital download
CollXtion I	Released: 7 April 2015 (Canada); Label: Universal Music; Formats: CD, vinyl, digital download, streaming
Catch EP	Released: 20 November 2015 (USA); Label: Twin Music; Formats: Digital download, streaming
CollXtion II: Ʉnsolved	Released: 15 March 2017; Label: Twin Music; Formats: Streaming
Super Sunset	Released: 29 October 2018; Label: Twin Music, Allie X Canada; Formats: CD, vinyl, digital download, streaming
Super Sunset (Analog)	Released: 1 January 2019; Label: Twin Music; Formats: Digital download, streaming, cassette

== Singles ==
=== As lead artist ===
Title	Year	Peak chart positions			Album
Title	Year	CAN	CAN CHR	CAN Hot AC	Album
"I Will Love You More"	2012	—	—	—	Non-album single
"Catch" (Note: "Catch" was first released in 2014 before being included on CollXtion I in 2015 and later re-released in the same year for the Catch EP.)	2014	55	17	34	CollXtion I
"Prime" (Note: "Prime" was also included on the Catch EP.)	2014	—	—	—	CollXtion I
"Bitch"	2014	—	—	—	CollXtion I
"Never Enough" (Note: "Never Enough" was included on the Catch EP and the deluxe, vinyl, and 2021 re-issue of CollXtion I)	2015	—	—	—	CollXtion I
"Too Much to Dream" (Note: "Too Much to Dream" was also included on the 2021 vinyl reissue of CollXtion I.)	2016	—	—	—	CollXtion II: Unsolved
"Purge" (Note: "Purge" was also included on the 2021 vinyl reissue of Collxtion II.)	2016	—	—	—	CollXtion II: Unsolved
"All the Rage"	2016	—	—	—	CollXtion II: Unsolved
"Old Habits Die Hard" (Note: A reworked version of "Old Habits Die Hard" was also included on CollXtion II)	2016	—	—	—	CollXtion II: Unsolved
"That's So Us" (Note: A reworked version of "That's So Us" was later included on CollXtion II)	2016	—	—	—	CollXtion II: Unsolved
"Misbelieving"	2016	—	—	—	CollXtion II: Unsolved
"Alexandra"	2016	—	—	—	CollXtion II: Unsolved
"Paper Love"	2017	—	21	45	CollXtion II
"Need You" (featuring Valley Girl)	2017	—	—	—	CollXtion II
"Casanova" (solo or featuring Vérité)	2017	—	44	—	CollXtion II
"Focus"	2018	—	—	—	Super Sunset
"Not So Bad in LA"	2018	—	—	—	Super Sunset
"Science"	2018	—	—	—	Super Sunset
"Little Things"	2018	—	—	—	Super Sunset
"Girl of the Year"	2018	—	—	—	Super Sunset
"Last Xmas"	2018	—	—	—	Non-album single
"Fresh Laundry"	2019	—	—	—	Cape God
"Rings a Bell"	2019	—	—	—	Cape God
"Regulars"	2019	—	—	—	Cape God
"Love Me Wrong" (with Troye Sivan)	2019	—	—	—	Cape God
"Devil I Know"	2020	—	—	—	Cape God
"Super Duper Party People"	2020	—	—	—	Cape God
"Downtown (2020)" (with Della Casa)	2020	—	—	—	Non-album single
"GLAM!" (Note: "GLAM!" was released as a digital single to promote its appearance on the 2021 vinyl reissue of CollXtion I.)	2021	—	—	—	CollXtion I
"Anchor"	2021	—	—	—	Cape God (Deluxe)
"Black Eye"	2023	—	—	—	Girl with No Face
"Girl with No Face"	2023	—	—	—	Girl with No Face
"Off with Her Tits"	2024	—	—	—	Girl with No Face
"Weird World"	2024	—	—	—	Girl with No Face
"Bon Voyage"	2024	—	—	—	Girl with No Face (Deluxe)
"Is Anybody Out There?"	2025	—	—	—	Happiness Is Going to Get You
"Reunite"	2025	—	—	—	Happiness Is Going to Get You
"Midnight for the Masses"	2026	—	—	—	
"—" denotes a recording that did not chart or was not released in that territory.

=== As featured artist ===
Title	Year	Album
"Shadow" (Vicetone featuring Allie X)	2020	Legacy
"Mistress Violet" (Violet Chachki featuring Allie X)	2021	Non-album single

== Music videos ==
Title	Year	Director(s)	Ref.
"I Will Love You More"	2012	Jeff Scheven	
"Bitch"	2014	Jungle George	
"Catch"	2015	Jérémie Saindon	
"Sanctuary" (live)	2015	Unknown	
"Too Much to Dream"	2016	Jungle George	
"All the Rage" (live)	2016	Jungle George	
"Casanova" (live)	2016	Jungle George	
"All the Rage"	2016	Jungle George; Maluko Haus	
"Old Habits Die Hard" (live)	2016	Taylor Heres	
"That's So Us" (live)	2016	Unknown	
"Too Much to Dream" (live)	2016	Unknown	
"Paper Love"	2017	Renata Raksha	
"Casanova" (featuring Vérité)	2017	India Sleem	
"Not So Bad in LA"	2018	Unknown	
"Fresh Laundry"	2019	Ssion	
"Regulars"	2019	Ssion	
"Black Eye"	2024	Allie X	
"Weird World"	2024	Allie X Bryan Hindle	
"Galina" (featuring Empress Of)	2024	Jennifer Juniper Stratford	
"Bon Voyage"	2024	Gemma Warren	

== Songwriting credits ==
Year	Artist	Title	Album
2015	Troye Sivan	"Bite"	Wild EP
2015	Troye Sivan	"Talk Me Down"	Blue Neighbourhood
2015	Troye Sivan	"Youth"	Blue Neighbourhood
2015	Troye Sivan	"Lost Boy"	Blue Neighbourhood
2015	Troye Sivan	"For Him."	Blue Neighbourhood
2015	Troye Sivan	"Suburbia"	Blue Neighbourhood
2015	Troye Sivan	"Swimming Pools"	Blue Neighbourhood
2017	Seohyun	"Moonlight"	Don't Say No
2017	Lea Michele	"Heavy Love"	Places
2017	Jaira Burns	"Ugly"	Non-album single
2017	Leland	"Mattress"	Non-album single
2017	BAP	"Think Hole"	Ego
2018	Ferras	"Coming Back Around"	Non-album single
2018	The Vamps	"Pictures of Us"	Night & Day (Day Edition)
2018	Troye Sivan	"Seventeen"	Bloom
2018	Troye Sivan	"The Good Side"	Bloom
2018	Troye Sivan	"Plum"	Bloom
2018	Troye Sivan	"What a Heavenly Way to Die"	Bloom
2018	Troye Sivan	"Animal"	Bloom
2018	Troye Sivan	"This This"	Bloom
2018	Neon Hitch	"Wall St"	Non-album single
2018	Betty Who	"The Other Side"	Sierra Burgess Is a Loser OST
2018	Leland	"Lights"	Sierra Burgess Is a Loser OST
2019	Leland	"Another Lover"	Non-album single
2020	BTS	"Louder Than Bombs"	Map of the Soul: 7
