= JP Saxe discography =

This is the discography for Canadian music producer/singer JP Saxe.

== Studio albums ==
Title	Details	Peak chart positions		Certifications
Title	Details	CAN	US Heat.	Certifications
Dangerous Levels of Introspection	Released: June 25, 2021; Label: Arista; Format: CD, digital download	61	7	MC: Gold
A Grey Area	Released: September 22, 2023; Label: Arista; Format: CD, digital download	—	—	
Okay Piano Guy	Released: October 23, 2026; Label: StarkerSaxe; Format: CD, digital download	—	—	
"—" denotes a recording that did not chart or was not released in that territory.

== Live albums ==
Title	Details
A Grey Area (Live Sessions)	Released: February 9, 2024; Label: Arista; Format: CD, digital download
Live on Stage	Released: June 28, 2024; Label: Arista; Format: CD, digital download

== Extended plays ==
Title	Details	Peak chart positions		Certifications
Title	Details	CAN	US Heat.	Certifications
Both Can Be True: Part 1	Released: November 8, 2018; Label: StarkerSaxeSongs; Format: Digital download	—	—	
Hold It Together	Released: February 7, 2020; Label: Arista, Sony; Format: CD, digital download	53	4	MC: Gold
Articulate Excuses	Released: April 18, 2025; Label: Arista, Sony; Format: CD, digital download	—	—	
Make Yourself at Home	Released: June 27, 2025; Label: Arista, Sony; Format: CD, digital download	—	—	
"—" denotes a recording that did not chart or was not released in that territory.

== Singles ==
=== As lead artist ===
Title	Year	Peak chart positions										Certifications	Album
Title	Year	CAN	AUS	AUT	DEN	IRE	NZ	SWE	SWI	UK	US	Certifications	Album
"Changed"	2017	—	—	—	—	—	—	—	—	—	—		Non-album singles
"Anybody Else"	2017	—	—	—	—	—	—	—	—	—	—		Non-album singles
"The Few Things" (solo or with Charlotte Lawrence)	2018	—	—	—	—	—	—	— (Note: "The Few Things" did not enter the Sverigetopplistan, but peaked at number 19 on the Swedish Heatseeker chart.)	—	—	—		Non-album singles
"25 in Barcelona"	2018	—	—	—	—	—	—	—	—	—	—		Both Can Be True: Part 1 and Hold It Together
"Same Room"	2019	—	—	—	—	—	—	—	—	—	—		Non-album singles
"Women Who Look Like You" (featuring Guapdad 4000)	2019	—	—	—	—	—	—	—	—	—	—		Non-album singles
"If the World Was Ending" (featuring Julia Michaels)	2019	13	29	65	39	17	20	32	56	14	27	MC: 7× Platinum; ARIA: 3× Platinum; BPI: 2× Platinum; GLF: 2× Platinum; IFPI AUT: Platinum; IFPI DEN: Platinum; IFPI SWI: Gold; RIAA: 4× Platinum; RMNZ: 3× Platinum	Hold It Together and Dangerous Levels of Introspection
"Sad Corny Fuck"	2020	—	—	—	—	—	—	—	—	—	—		Hold It Together
"Hey Stupid, I Love You"	2020	—	—	—	—	—	—	—	—	—	—		Non-album single
"A Little Bit Yours"	2020	86	—	—	—	—	—	—	—	—	—	MC: Platinum	Dangerous Levels of Introspection
"Kissin' in the Cold" (with Julia Michaels)	2020	—	—	—	—	—	— (Note: "Kissin' in the Cold" did not enter the NZ Top 40 Singles Chart, but peaked at number 32 on the NZ Hot Singles Chart.)	—	—	—	—		Non-album single
"Line by Line" (with Maren Morris)	2021	96	—	—	—	—	— (Note: "Line by Line" did not enter the NZ Top 40 Singles Chart, but peaked at number 39 on the NZ Hot Singles Chart.)	—	—	—	—	MC: Gold	Dangerous Levels of Introspection
"Like That"	2021	—	—	—	—	—	—	—	—	—	—		Dangerous Levels of Introspection
"Dangerous Levels of Introspection"	2021	—	—	—	—	—	—	—	—	—	—		Dangerous Levels of Introspection
"When You Think of Me"	2022	—	—	—	—	—	—	—	—	—	—		A Grey Area
"The Good Parts"	2022	—	—	—	—	—	—	—	—	—	—		A Grey Area
"Moderación" (with Camilo)	2023	—	—	—	—	—	—	—	—	—	—		A Grey Area
"I Don't Miss You"	2023	—	—	—	—	—	—	—	—	—	—		A Grey Area
"Everything Ends" (featuring Lizzy McAlpine and Tiny Habits)	2023	—	—	—	—	—	—	—	—	—	—		A Grey Area
"Caught Up on You"	2023	—	—	—	—	—	—	—	—	—	—		A Grey Area
"Anywhere" (with Carla Morrison)	2023	—	—	—	—	—	—	—	—	—	—		Non-album single
"Safe"	2025	—	—	—	—	—	—	—	—	—	—		Articulate Excuses
"Smartphone Make Me Dumb"	2025	—	—	—	—	—	—	—	—	—	—		Articulate Excuses
"Strangers" (featuring Tini)	2025	—	—	—	—	—	—	—	—	—	—		Make Yourself at Home
"When I Lose You"	2026	—	—	—	—	—	—	—	—	—	—		Okay Piano Guy
"—" denotes a recording that did not chart or was not released in that territory.

=== As featured artist ===
Title	Year	Album
"Love Sick" (Alex St. Kitts featuring JP Saxe)	2017	The Projektor II (EP)
"Golf on TV" (Lennon Stella featuring JP Saxe)	2020	Three. Two. One.
"Maybe Don't" (Maisie Peters featuring JP Saxe)	2020	Non-album single
"Runnin'" (Ingrid Andress featuring JP Saxe)	2022	Good Person (Deluxe only)
"Without You" (Petit Biscuit and Surf Mesa featuring JP Saxe)	2024	Non-album single

== Songwriting credits ==
Year	Artist	Album	Song	Co-written with
2015	Samantha Jade	Nine	"Shake That" (featuring Pitbull)	Leon Thomas III, Carmen Reece, Babyface, Antonio Dixon, Kris Riddick-Tynes, Armando Pérez
2016	Foxes	All I Need	"Scar"	Louisa Allen, Janee Bennett, Babyface, Antonio Dixon, Kris Riddick-Tynes
2016	Snoh Aalegra	Don't Explain	"Under the Influence"	Snoh Aalegra
2016	Snoh Aalegra	Don't Explain	"Under the Influence Pt. II"	Snoh Aalegra
2016	Isac Elliot	A Little More EP	"Wishful Thinking"	Isac Elliot, Trevion Stokes, Jordan Sapp, Johnny Severin
2016	Mario Jose	Heart of Gold EP	"Tell Me Now"	Mario Jose
2017	Rotana	Non-album single	"Daddy"	Rotana Tarabzouni, Carrie Haber
2017	Jacob Banks	TBWCF EP	"Chainsmoking"	Jacob Banks, Ajay Bhattacharya
2017	Jacob Banks	TBWCF EP	"Mercy"	Jacob Banks, Jonatan Ayal, Pierre-Luc Rioux
2017	Anja Nissen	Where I Am EP	"Tears Ago"	Anja Nissen, Carmen Reece, Antonio Dixon, Kris Riddick-Tynes
2017	Phlake	Weird Invitations	"Brush"	Mads Bo, Jonathan Eikaer, Gisli Gislason, Daniel Wilson, Robin Hannibal
2017	Snoh Aalegra	Feels	"You Keep Me Waiting" (featuring Vic Mensa)	Snoh Aalegra, Victor Mensah
2018	Jacob Banks	Fifty Shades Freed	"Diddy Bop" (with Louis the Child)	Frederic Kennett, Robert Hauldren, Jacob Banks
2018	Stanaj	Non-album single	"Dirty Mind" (featuring Ty Dolla Sign)	David Brown, Jonathan Price, Tyrone Griffin Jr.
2018	Allie X	Super Sunset	"Focus"	Alexandra Hughes, Yonatan Ayal, Pierre Luc-Rioux
2018	Jacob Banks	Village	"Be Good to Me" (featuring Seinabo Sey)	Jacob Banks, Laleh Pourkarim, Yonatan Ayal, Pierre Luc-Rioux
2019	Julia Michaels	Non-album single	"If You Need Me"	Julia Michaels, Benjamin Rice
2019	Allie X	Cape God	"Devil I Know"	Alexandra Hughes, Cara Salimando, Oscar Gorres, Jens Duvsjo
2020	Marina Lin	Non-album single	"3 Minutes"	Ryan Marrone
2021	Julia Michaels	Not in Chronological Order	"All Your Exes"	Julia Michaels, Stefan Johnson, Jordan Johnson, Oliver Peterhof
2021	Julia Michaels	Not in Chronological Order	"Little Did I Know"	Julia Michaels
2021	Ingrid Andress	Non-album single	"Wishful Drinking" (featuring Sam Hunt)	Ingrid Andress, Jonny Price, Lucky Daye, Rykeyz
2021	Rehan Dalal	Fruit of a Poison Tree	"Throw Your Fire"	Rehan Dalal
2022	Fletcher	Girl of My Dreams	“Birthday Girl”	Fletcher, Ryan Marrone
2023	Sabrina Carpenter	emails i can't send fwd:	"Already Over" "because i liked a boy" "decode" "emails i can’t send" "Fast Times" "how many things" "Tornado Warnings" "skinny dipping"	John Ryan, Julia Michaels, Sabrina Carpenter, Ryan Marrone, Jorgen Odegard, Leroy Clampitt
2023	Lewis Capaldi	Broken By Desire to be Heavenly Sent	"Wish You The Best"	Lewis Capaldi, Malay
2023	Ingrid Andress	Good Person (Deluxe)	"Runnin (with JP Saxe)"	Indrid Andress, Ryan Marrone
2023	Gayle	Non-album single	"don’t call me pretty"	GAYLE, Ryan Marrone
2023	Ariana DeBose	Wish (Original Motion Picture Soundtrack)	“This Wish”	Benjamin Rice, Julia Michaels
2024	Mau y Ricky	Hotel Caracas	"Muriendo de Miedo" "Pasado Manana" "Cancion 2" "David Beckham" "Vas a Destrozarme" "Gran Dia" "WOW" "Fetiche" "Espectacular" "Fkn Mentiroso" "Amarte Tanto" "Karma"	James Ho, Ricardo Andrés Reglero, Mauricio Alberto Reglero, Ricardo Andrés Reglero, Jonathan Leone, Jean Carlos Santiago Perez, Vladimir Dotel López,
2025	Sadie Jean	Early Twenties Torture	"See you on Sunday"	Sadie Jean, Griff Clawson
