= Weird World =

Weird World may refer to:

- Weird World (magazine), a British pulp magazine published in 1955 and 1956
- Weird World, an imprint of Domino Recording Company
- "Weird World", a song on 2005 album Never Gone by Backstreet Boys
- "Weird World", a song by Allie X from her 2024 album Girl with No Face
