= Billboard (music producer) =

Canadian music producer, songwriter and engineer

- Also known as: Mont Duamel
- Born: Mathieu Jomphe-Lépine; 4 September 1988 (age 38)
- Genres: Pop; hip hop; R&B; EDM
- Occupation: Record producer
- Years active: 2008–present

Mathieu Jomphe-Lépine (born September 4, 1988), also known professionally as Billboard, is a Canadian music producer, songwriter, and engineer. He is based in Montreal, Quebec. He has received nominations for three Grammy Awards, including Best Dance Recording for Robyn's "Call Your Girlfriend" (2011), Best Urban Contemporary Album for Kehlani's You Should Be Here (2015), and Best Pop Vocal Album for Ariana Grande's Dangerous Woman (2016). He also releases original music and visual art through his dedicated artist project, Mont Duamel.

== Discography ==
=== Singles ===
Year	Title	Peak chart positions										Certifications
Year	Title	US	US Dance	US Pop	US Rhythmic	US Hip-Hop	AUS	CAN	NZ	FR	UK	Certifications
2020	"Sleeping In" All Time Low	–	–	–	–	–	–	–	–	–	—	
2020	"L’Ère Du Verseau" Yelle	–	–	–	–	–	–	–	–	74	—	
2020	"Rare" Selena Gomez	30	–	17	–	–	22	21	28	73	28	
2019	""Crave" Madonna & Swae Lee " Madonna	–	–	–	–	–	–	–	–	51	23	
2019	""Medellin" Madonna & Maluma" Madonna	–	–	–	–	–	–	37	37	11	87	Gold [Italy]
2018	"Kiss and Make Up" Dua Lipa & Blackpink	93	–	–	–	–	33	44	32	65	36	Gold [Italy, Portugal] Silver [UK] Platinum [Australia]
2017	"Todo Cambio" Becky G	–	–	–	–	–	–	–	–	–	—	
2016	"Thinking 'Bout You" Ariana Grande	–	–	–	–	–	–	–	–	–	183	
2015	"Ghosttown" Madonna	–	–	–	–	–	–	40	–	34	117	Platinum [Italy]
2015	"Rooftop" Zara Larsson	–	–	–	–	–	–	–	–	–	—	
2015	"Push" A-Trak ft. Andrew Wyatt	–	–	–	–	–	–	86	–	–	—	
2015	"CollXtion I" Allie X	–	–	–	–	–	–	–	–	–	—	
2015	"Surrender" Hurts	–	–	–	–	–	–	–	–	–	12	
2014	""Dare (la la la)" Shakira	53	5	–	–	–	–	80	–	11	—	Gold [Germany, Mexico, Switzerland] Platinum [US, Italy]
2014	"You're Gone" Elliphant	–	–	–	–	–	–	–	–	–	—	
2014	"Speak in Tongues" Ferras	–	–	–	–	–	–	–	–	–	—	
2014	"Moteur Action" Yelle	–	–	–	–	–	–	–	–	–	—	
2012	""Popular Song"" Mika ft. Ariana Grande	87	–	–	–	–	–	71	–	–	—	Gold [US]
2012	"Call Your Girlfriend" Robyn	–	1	–	–	–	–	–	–	17	55	Gold [US]
2011	"Till the World Ends" Britney Spears	3	1	–	9	–	8	4	10	8	21	Gold [Belgium, Denmark, Mexico, NZ, Switzerland] Platinum [Italy] 2× Platinum [Australia] 3× Platinum [Sweden] Silver [UK]
2011	""Hold It Against Me" Britney Spears	1	1	–	14	–	4	1	1	31	6	Platinum [Australia] Gold [Mexico] Gold [NZ] 2× Platinum [Sweden] Silver [UK]

=== Full discography ===
Year	Title	Artist	Album	Role
2026	Lonely Side of the Bed	Carly Rae Jepsen	Day and Night	Producer, songwriter
2026	Wedding Season	Carly Rae Jepsen	Day and Night	Producer, songwriter
2026	Patience Power Passion	Carly Rae Jepsen	Day and Night	Producer, songwriter
2026	Super Sage	Carly Rae Jepsen	Day and Night	Producer
2026	Yes	Carly Rae Jepsen	Day and Night	Producer, songwriter
2026	Love Depressed	Carly Rae Jepsen	Day and Night	Producer
2024	Imagine EP	Mont Duamel	Imagine EP	Artist, writer, producer, engineer, songwriter
2024	Mont Royal	Mont Duamel	Single	Artist, writer, producer, engineer, songwriter
2024	Lorelei	Empress Of	For Your Consideration	Producer, Songwriter
2024	Gimmie	Kyle Dion	If My Jeans Could Talk	Co-producer
2023	Out of Luck (feat.Lolo Zouaï & Amber Mark)	Tkay Maidza	Single	Co-producer, Songwriter
2023	Kiss Me (feat. Rina Sawayama)	Empress Of, Rina Sawayama	Single	Co-producer
2023	Vertigo	Duckwrth	Single	Co-producer, Songwriter
2023	Big Bewts	Duckwrth	Single	Co-producer, Songwriter
2023	Feed The Beast	Kim Petras	Feed The Beast	Co-producer, Songwriter
2023	I Saw God	Donna Missal	Revel	Producer, Songwriter
2023	God Complex	Donna Missal	Revel	Producer, Songwriter
2023	Out Of Me	Donna Missal	Revel	Co-producer
2023	Move Me	Donna Missal	Revel	Producer, Songwriter
2023	buzzkill	Leyla Blue		Producer, Songwriter
2023	Flicker	Donna Missal	Revel	Co-producer
2022	In The Honey	Wafia	Single	Producer, Songwriter
2021	Voice In My Head	Alessia Cara	In The Meantime	Producer, Songwriter
2021	Distance	OneRepublic	Human (Deluxe)	Co-Producer, Songwriter
2021	Hold On Till We Get There	Chiiild	Hope For Sale	Co-Producer, Songwriter
2021	13 Months Of Sunshine	Chiiild	Hope For Sale	Co-Producer, Songwriter
2021	The Best Ain't Happened Yet	Chiiild	Hope For Sale	Co-Producer, Songwriter
2021	Good Things	Wafia	Good Things	Co-Producer, Songwriter
2021	People You Know	Selena Gomez	Rare	Co-Producer, Songwriter
2021	One Star Rating	Elah Hale	Room 206 EP	Producer, Songwriter
2021	FAKE SONGS	Zagata	Fairplay	Co-Producer, Songwriter
2020	Find Myself	Mont Duamel	Find Myself	Artist, Writer, Producer, Engineer, Songwriter
2020	By My Side	Mont Duamel	Find Myself	Artist, Writer, Producer, Engineer, Songwriter
2020	Stay A While	Mont Duamel	Find Myself	Artist, Writer, Producer, Engineer, Songwriter
2020	Between Us	Mont Duamel	Find Myself	Artist, Writer, Producer, Engineer, Songwriter
2020	Sinking Ships	Mont Duamel	Find Myself	Artist, Writer, Producer, Engineer, Songwriter
2020	Eyes On You	Mont Duamel	Find Myself	Artist, Writer, Producer, Engineer, Songwriter
2020	Visages	Mont Duamel	Find Myself	Artist, Writer, Producer, Engineer, Songwriter
2019	Sanse faire d'histoire	Loud	Tout ça pour ça	Co-producer
2019	The Sauce	Gashi	GASHI	Co-producer
2019	Faz Gostoso (feat Anitta)	Madonna, Anitta	Madame X	Co-producer
2019	Crave (with Swae Lee)	Madonna, Swae Lee	Madame X	Co-producer, Songwriter
2019	Bitch I'm Loca (feat. Maluma)	Madonna, Maluma	Madame X	Co-producer
2019	Medellín (with Maluma)	Madonna, Maluma	Madame X	Co-producer
2019	Future (with Quava)	Madonna, Quava	Madame X	Co-producer, Songwriter
2019	Batuka	Madonna	Madame X	Co-producer
2019	Killers Who Are Partying	Madonna	Madame X	Co-producer
2019	Extreme Occident	Madonna	Madame X	Co-producer
2018	Kiss and Make Up	Dua Lipa, Blackpink	Dua Lipa	Co-producer, Songwriter
2018	If You Were Mine	Ocean Park Standoff	-	Co-producer, Songwriter
2018	iMissMe (feat. Khalid)	KYLE, Khalid	Light of Mine	Co-producer, Songwriter
2018	NIGHTS LIKE THESE	Ne-Yo, Romeo Santos	GOOD MAN	Co-producer, Songwriter
2018	Insecure	Amara La Negra	-	Co-producer, Songwriter
2018	Rip Tides	Scavenger Hunt	-	Co-producer, Songwriter
2018	Ultraviolet	Billboard	Ultraviolet	Artist, Writer, Producer, Engineer, Songwriter
2018	Into You	Billboard	Into You	Artist, Writer, Producer, Engineer, Songwriter
2018	Moving	Billboard	Moving	Artist, Writer, Producer, Engineer, Songwriter
2018	Either	Poo Bear, Zara Larsson	Poo Bear Presents: Bearthday Music	Co-producer, Songwriter
2017	FML	K.Flay	-	Co-producer, Songwriter
2017	Infinity	Jaymes Young	Feel Something	Co-producer, Songwriter
2017	Ugly	Jaira Burns	-	Co-producer, Songwriter
2017	Emotions	Chris Brown	Heartbreak on a Full Moon	Producer, Songwriter
2017	Todo Cambio (feat. CNCO)	Becky G, CNCO	-	Co-producer, Songwriter
2017	Todo Cambio	Becky G	-	Co-producer, Songwriter
2017	TKO	Erik Hassle	Innocence Lost	Producer, Songwriter
2017	That's So Us	Allie X	CollXition II	Co-producer, Songwriter
2017	Lifted	Allie X	CollXition II	Co-producer
2017	Paper Love	Allie X	CollXition II	Additional Production
2017	Old Habits Die Hard	Allie X	CollXition II	Co-producer
2017	Paper Love (Billboard Remix)	Allie X	CollXition II	Co-producer
2016	Thinking Bout You	Ariana Grande	Dangerous Woman	Co-producer, Songwriter
2016	Paralyzed	Chelsea Lankes	-	Co-producer, Songwriter
2016	Home	Chelsea Lankes	-	Co-producer, Songwriter
2016	Not Ready	Elliphant	Living Life Golden	Co-producer, Songwriter
2016	Lucid Dream	Billboard	Memories	Artist, Writer, Producer, Engineer, Songwriter
2016	Forward	Billboard	Memories	Artist, Writer, Producer, Engineer, Songwriter
2016	Memories	Billboard	Memories	Artist, Writer, Producer, Engineer, Songwriter
2016	It's You	Billboard	Memories	Artist, Writer, Producer, Engineer, Songwriter
2016	Polarize	Billboard	Memories	Artist, Writer, Producer, Engineer, Songwriter
2016	Hours	Billboard	Memories	Artist, Writer, Producer, Engineer, Songwriter
2016	Epilogue	Billboard	Memories	Artist, Writer, Producer, Engineer, Songwriter
2016	Trying to Be Cool	A-Trak Remix, Phoenix	In the Loop: A Decade of Remixes	Co-producer
2015	Push	A-Trak feat. Andrew Wyatt	-	Co-producer, Songwriter
2015	Never Been In Love (Billboard Remix)	Elliphant	Never Been In Love (Remixes)	Co-producer
2015	Anchor	Sophia Black		Co-producer, Songwriter
2015	Be Alright	Kehlani	You Should Be Here	Co-producer, Songwriter
2015	Slow	Hurts	Surrender	Co-producer, Songwriter
2015	Synthesize Me	Shy Girls	4wz	Producer, Songwriter
2015	Ghosttown	Madonna	Rebel Heart	Co-producer
2015	Tumor	Allie X	Collxition I	Producer, Songwriter
2015	Motion	Billboard	Motion	Artist, Writer, Producer, Engineer, Songwriter
2015	Shapes	Billboard	Shapes	Artist, Writer, Producer, Engineer, Songwriter
2015	Souveneir	Billboard	Souveneir	Artist, Writer, Producer, Engineer, Songwriter
2015	Good	Allie X	Collxition I	Producer, Songwriter
2014	Make Me Fade	K.Flay	Life as a Dog	Producer, Songwriter
2014	Moteur action	Yelle	Complètement fou	Co-producer, Songwriter
2014	Love in the Middle of a Firefight (feat. Brendon Urie)	Dillon Francis	Money Sucks, Friends Rule	Co-producer, Songwriter
2014	You're Gone	Elliphant	One More	Co-producer, Songwriter
2014	Revolusion	Elliphant	Look Like You Love It	Co-producer, Songwriter
2014	Speak in Tongues	Ferras	Ferras	Co-producer, Songwriter
2014	Dare (La La La)	Shakira	Shakira.	Co-producer, Songwriter
2013	Starf***er	K.Flay	What If It Is	Producer, Songwriter
2013	Mirror - From "The Hunger Games: Catching Fire"	Ellie Goulding	The Hunger Games: Catching Fire	Producer, Songwriter
2013	Hanging On	Ellie Goulding	Halcyon Days	Producer
2013	Zoomin' Zoomin'	Becky G	Play It Again	Co-producer, Songwriter
2012	Hanging On - edit	Ellie Goulding	Halcyon Days	Producer
2012	Rooftop	Zara Larsson	Uncover	Co-producer, Songwriter
2012	Out Alive	Ke$ha	Warrior	Co-producer
2012	Out of My Mind (feat. Nicki Minaj)	B.o.B, Nicki Minaj	Strange Clouds	Co-producer, Songwriter
2012	In My City	Ellie Goulding	Halcyon Days	Producer, Songwriter
2011	Wrecking Ball	Frankmusik	Do it In The AM	Co-producer
2011	Look At Her Go (feat. Chris Brown)	T-Pain	rEVOLVEr	Producer, Songwriter
2011	Till The World Ends	Britney Spears	Femme Fatale	Co-producer
2011	Inside Out	Britney Spears	Femme Fatale	Co-producer, Songwriter
2011	(Drop Dead) Beautiful (feat. Sabi)	Britney Spears	Femme Fatale	Co-producer, Songwriter
2011	Hold It Against Me	Britney Spears	Femme Fatale	Co-producer, Songwriter
2011	Popular Song	MIKA	The Origin of Love	Songwriter
2011	Step With Me	MIKA	The Origin of Love	Songwriter
2010	Take it Off (Billboard Radio Mix)	Ke$ha	Animal	Producer
2010	Animal (Billboard Remix)	Ke$ha	Animal	Producer
2010	Cannibal	Ke$ha	Animal	Co-producer, Songwriter
2009	Get Myself Together	Robyn	Body Talk	Producer
2009	Stars 4-Ever	Robyn	Body Talk	Producer
2009	Call Your Girlfriend	Robyn	Body Talk	Producer
