= Vérité =

American singer-songwriter

- Born: Kelsey Regina Byrne; May 6, 1990 (age 36); Orange County, New York, US
- Genres: Indie pop; alternative pop; electropop
- Occupations: Singer; songwriter
- Instruments: Vocals; piano
- Years active: 2014–present
- Label: AWAL
- Spouse: Nick Susi (m. 2024)
- Website: veriteofficial.com

Kelsey Regina Byrne (born May 6, 1990), known professionally as Vérité (stylized as VÉRITÉ), is an American singer and songwriter based in Brooklyn, New York City. Her first single "Strange Enough" was self-released in July 2014, reaching number one on Hype Machine and becoming the #1 Most Viral Twitter Artist the week of release. Described variously as indie pop, electropop or alternative pop, Liza Darwin of Noisey wrote that her 2014 Echo EP is "packed with crisp, delicate vocals, soaring melodies, and glistening production." Her second EP, Sentiment, was self-released on June 8, 2015. The EP was praised by Time, who called her vocals "rich and ethereal". She has toured internationally and performed at events such as Neon Gold Popshop, South by Southwest, The Knitting Factory, Brooklyn Bowl, the Firefly Festival and Lollapalooza.

== Early life and education ==
Kelsey Regina Byrne was born on May 6, 1990, in Orange County, New York, where she was raised. Introduced to music at a young age, her father was a rock musician, and Vérité began performing at small local venues while still in elementary school. She learned piano when young, and also grew up listening to 1990s alternative rock bands such as The Cranberries, The Breeders, Nirvana, and Green Day. In middle school she was in an all-girls punk cover band, and she started writing her own music around the age of 16. She supported her schooling at SUNY Purchase by waiting tables, and graduated with a Bachelor of Arts in studio composition.

== Music career ==
=== 2013–2014: Career beginnings ===
Circa late 2012 or early 2013, she began collaborating with producer Elliot Jacobson, after Jacobson reached out to her on Twitter. Vérité in turn started writing and recording music under the name Vérité, which translates in French to "truth". She eventually left her job in the food industry to work on her music full-time, after ten years waitressing, the last three of which were at Applebee's restaurant in Times Square.

She started promoting her first single "Strange Enough" in July 2014. It also reached number one on Hype Machine, with Vérité at the time keeping her real name hidden. The song was generally well received by critics, with Complex calling it a "scorching breakup anthem... whose scathing chorus could burn any bad relationship with a vengeance." Casey Lewis of Noisey called it a "haunting, euphoric piece of electro-pop."

Her second track "Weekend" was a "Pick of the Day" for the CDS Music Chart on August 26, 2014. She described "Weekend" as "written to be a snapshot of a moment. It's caught between the nostalgia of everything that was exhilarating and the reality of how temporary that elation can be." Interview Magazine called the track a "beautiful pop gem", where her vocals were "layered gorgeously into something that could perhaps be described as musical fairy dust.'"

=== 2014–2016: Echo, Sentiment and Living ===
Her first live show as Vérité was at the New York Neon Gold Popshop. She went on to play a number of gigs promoted by Neon Gold Records, including their showcase in March 2014 at South by Southwest. In September 2014 the song "Echo", the title track from her then-upcoming debut EP, was released exclusively through Billboard's website. Billboard wrote the song "positions the singer as an artist capable of delivering a sweeping hook while emphasizing the subtler details of her arrangements."

On October 20, 2014, she self-released her Echo EP, which includes four tracks: "Strange Enough", "Weekend", "Echo", and "Heartbeat." Liza Darwin of Noisey wrote that "the EP is packed with crisp, delicate vocals, soaring melodies, and glistening production..." After the release she performed a number of late October shows in Brooklyn, including an October 21 show at the BMI Showcase at The Knitting Factory, and shows afterwards at Brooklyn Bowl, Santos Party, and Glasslands with Kate Boy. She self-released Echo EP (The Remixes) on December 15, 2014, which included five remixes by artists such as Penguin Prison.

"The songs [on the Sentiment EP] are complex electronic arrangements, layered with Byrne's rich and ethereal vocals. The runs in the chorus of 'Colors' require a vocal control and stamina she calls 'a beast' to perform live. 'Wasteland' is at once meditative and pulsing, her voice alternately sweet and booming."
— Eliza Berman of Time (June 8, 2015)

She released her single "Wasteland" on February 25, 2015. ChartShaker.com described it as "exquisitely meshing Vérité's ethereal vocals with pounding, uptempo electro beats." Sean Moller of Paste magazine described "Wasteland" as having a "Lana Del Rey vibe that goes a long way."

Her single "Colors", produced by Zach Nicita, was self-released on April 22, 2015. After being featured in Spin magazine on June 3, 2015, Vérité then self-released her second four-track EP Sentiment on June 8, 2015. Her previous singles "Wasteland" and "Colors" were included, as were the new tracks "Rearrange" and "Sentiment", About the overall lyrics, she stated "there's definitely a few brief themes that run through it: mainly, nostalgia, apathy and the exploration of how to connect." Time magazine praised the release, calling her vocals "rich and ethereal."

She has performed internationally and opened for notable bands such as Stars, whom she performed with at Webster Hall in New York City. Early in the summer of 2015 she performed at the Westway with Gallant, the Firefly Festival in June 2015, and Lollapalooza's BMI stage. On March 3, 2016, she released "Underdressed" to serve as the lead single from her Living EP. Living was released on May 6, 2016 On September 9, 2016, she released a cover of "Somebody Else" by The 1975; the song was a streaming success, attaining over 100 million streams on Spotify as of March 2019.

=== 2017–2018: Somewhere in Between ===
On January 13, 2017, Vérité released "Phase Me Out" to serve as the lead single from her debut studio album, Somewhere in Between. She performed the song on NBC's Today show on January 25, 2017. The second single "When You're Gone" was released on March 31, 2017. Somewhere in Between was self-released on June 23, 2017, in partnership with Kobalt Label Services. The album was recorded in London, New York, and Los Angeles, and features production from Liam Howe, Tim Anderson, Peter Thomas, James Flannigan, and Zach Nicita.

=== 2019–2021: New Skin and New Limbs (Vol. 1) ===
On May 31, 2019, Vérité released a single titled "Gone". Her second studio album, New Skin, was released on October 25, 2019.

In 2021, Vérité released a four-track EP titled New Limbs (Vol. 1). The release was preceded by the single "Younger Woman." Other standouts on the album include the emotional "I'll Take The Blame," which Vérité describes as "a story, vaguely told. It's about loving someone so much you'll take on the hurt and the mess for them and let them walk away." In 2021, she released two singles: "By Now" on April 15, and "He's Not You" on July 23. She additionally collaborated with producer Jax Anderson on his song "Bigger Picture." She has said that while her next project may not be a specific new limbs (vol. 2) follow-up, the music will "continue to be extensions of where [she's] been and experiments in where [she] can go."

=== 2022-present: Love You Forever ===
In 2022, Vérité announced that work on her new album concluded. On September 22, 2022, she released "Are We Done Yet?" as the lead single off the project and announced special merch including a sweater with a code to information about the upcoming album. On October 19, she released the title track "Love You Forever" as the second single off the album.

On January 5, 2023, Vérité announced that her album Love You Forever will be released on February 24, 2023. Shortly afterwards, Vérité announced the "Love You Forever Tour" and released "Temporary" as the 3rd single from the album. The tour took place starting on March 3, 2023, in Toronto and will concluded on April 8 in Washington, DC. On February 17, she released "Cry Cry Cry" as the fourth single to album.

== Personal life ==
On February 6, 2024, Vérité announced via social media that she had married her boyfriend Nick Susi in a casual ceremony on their couch at home.

== Musical style ==
Vérité's music has been described as indie pop, alternative pop, and electropop. About how she sees her own music, Vérité explains that when she released her single "Heartbeat" in 2014, "people called it pop. I was just like, 'OK, I guess it's pop.'" In 2020, she described her sound as "alt-pop" and cited artists like The Cranberries, Fiona Apple, James Blake, and Kimbra as influences on her music.

About her songwriting process, she states "when it comes to production and the overall sound I don't really have a lot of intentions with it. I start off with melody and a lyrical idea, and then build off of that story." About themes, she states that "people can really ascribe their own meaning, which I kind of encourage." Eliza Berman of Time opines that Vérité "writes songs about the human condition: what it's like to be here, to inhabit your own mind, to try to connect with others. If that sounds incredibly broad, that's because it is."

== Discography ==
=== Studio albums ===
Title	Details
Somewhere in Between	Released: June 23, 2017; Label: Independent; Formats: CD, LP, digital download
New Skin	Released: October 25, 2019; Label: Independent; Formats: LP, digital download
Love You Forever	Released: February 24, 2023; Label: Independent; Formats: LP, digital download

=== Remix albums ===
Title	Details
Somewhere in Between (The Remixes)	Released: February 23, 2018; Label: Self-released; Format: Digital download

=== Extended plays ===
Title	Details
Echo	Released: October 20, 2014; Label: Self-released; Format: Digital download
Sentiment	Released: June 8, 2015; Label: Self-released; Format: Digital download
Living	Released: May 6, 2016; Label: Self-released; Format: Digital download
Vérité on Audiotree Live	Released: June 20, 2017; Label: Audiotree; Format: Digital download
Bunker Studios Sessions, Brooklyn, NY	Released: December 21, 2018; Label: Self-released; Format: Digital download
New Limbs (Vol. 1)	Released: October 9, 2020; Label: Independent; Format: Digital Download

=== Singles ===
==== As lead artist ====
Title	Year	Album
"Strange Enough"	2014	Echo
"Weekend"	2014	Echo
"Echo"	2014	Echo
"Heartbeat"	2014	Echo
"Wasteland"	2015	Sentiment
"Colors"	2015	Sentiment
"Sober" (Childish Gambino cover)	2015	Non-album single
"Underdressed"	2016	Living
"Constant Crush"	2016	Living
"Gesture"	2016	Living
"Somebody Else" (The 1975 cover)	2016	Non-album single
"Phase Me Out"	2017	Somewhere in Between
"When You're Gone"	2017	Somewhere in Between
"Bout You"	2017	Somewhere in Between
"Saint"	2017	Somewhere in Between
"John My Beloved" (Sufjan Stevens cover)	2017	Non-album single
"Bout You" (with Pell)	2018	Somewhere in Between (The Remixes)
"Gone"	2019	New Skin
"Youth"	2019	New Skin
"Ocean"	2019	New Skin
"Good for It"	2019	New Skin
"Think of Me"	2019	New Skin
"Younger Women"	2020	New Limbs (Vol. 1)
"I'll Take the Blame"	2020	New Limbs (Vol. 1)
"By Now"	2021	Non-album singles
"He's Not You"	2021	Non-album singles
"Teenage Dream" (Katy Perry cover)	2021	Non-album singles
"Blackout Christmas"	2021	Non-album singles
"Pour It Down" (with Showtek)	2022	Non-album singles
"Are We Done Yet?"	2022	Love You Forever
"Love You Forever"	2022	Love You Forever
"Above the Salt" (with Portair)	2022	Non-album singles
"I Don't Want You to Come Home for Christmas"	2022	Non-album singles
"Temporary"	2023	Love You Forever
"Cry Cry Cry"	2023	Love You Forever

==== As featured artist ====
Title	Year	Chart peaks		Album
Title	Year	US Dance	US Dance Airplay	Album
"Bad Habits" (Monsieur Adi featuring Vérité)	2016	—	—	Non-album single
"Trouble" (R3hab featuring Vérité)	2017	6	—	Trouble
"Just a Feeling" (Phantoms featuring Vérité)	2017	—	10	Phantoms
"Casanova" (Allie X featuring Vérité)	2017	—	—	CollXtion II
"You Don't Know About Me" (The ACLU Remix) (Ella Vos featuring Vérité, Icona Pop and Mija)	2018	—	—	Non-album single
"Ultraviolet" (MisterWives feat. Vérité)	2024	—	—	Nosebleeds: Encore
"—" denotes a recording that did not chart or was not released in that territory.

== See also ==
- List of singer-songwriters
