= Catch (Allie X song) =

Single by Allie X

from the EP CollXtion I
- Released: February 3, 2014
- Genre: Synth-pop
- Length: 3:46
- Label: Universal Music; Label X; Sleepless Records
- Songwriters: Steve McKay; Kieran Adams; Graham Bertie; Michael Wise; Alexandra Hughes; Alex Puodziukas
- Producers: Alexandra Hughes; Michael Wise

Allie X singles chronology
"Catch" (2014)	"Prime" (2014)

Alternative covers
- Re-release single and EP cover

Music video
- "Catch" on YouTube

Audio sample
- Catch is a mid-tempo synth-pop song. 0:21: file; help

"Catch" is the debut single by Canadian singer-songwriter Allie X, from her major label debut EP CollXtion I, released initially on February 3, 2014, with a GIF designed by Logan White and Krissie Torgerson. It was re-released on November 20, 2015 as an EP with additional tracks. It is the first single under the name of Allie X.

== Recording and composition ==
Production took nearly two years to complete, going through several massive changes in tempo, key, and genre. Approximately 20 versions of the song exist, the first of which is a R&B track. The song has been described as detailing a macabre doctor-patient relationship. She has also stated the song deals with her not wanting to submit to all of the addictions associated with fame.

== Critical response ==
- Upon the release of "Catch", Jamie Milton of DIY magazine says, of Allie X and her single, "Allie X stepped on the scene like a bottle of wine at a wedding - everyone wanted a piece of her."
- Time's Jamieson Cox complemented the track, saying it "shines with a level of polish and craft that's remarkable", and complemented X's "attention to detail".
- Joshua Bote of The Daily Californian said of her September 2015 live performance at Rickshaw Stop of the songs from CollXtion I, "Her nearly flawless performance left a gaping hole where Allie X's identity should have been." Bote also stated, "she launched into tune after tune from CollXtion and consistently maintained the awkward rigidity of her semi-dancing, semi-flailing routine. Each number was flawlessly performed, but her set lacked an identifiable persona that set her apart from any of the Top 40 divas."
- Logan White of Billboard magazine called "Catch" "an expertly crafted, remarkably vulnerable synth-pop showcase."
- Carl Williot from Idolator said that "Catch" was "everything that's wonderful about under-the-radar pop music right now: immaculate hooks, pristine synth work, vocal versatility, bold atmospherics and a beating, bursting heart", and named it "the best song of 2014".

== Music video ==
=== Development ===
Depicted above is the GIF, made with Logan White and Krissie Torgerson, originally released alongside "Catch", that has attained a level of notoriety.

The music video was released on January 21, 2015 and was directed by Jérémie Saindon, with Shayne Laverdière serving as director of photography, and Louisa Schabas as the art director. It was edited by Sébastien Delporte, styled by Melissa Matos, and make up was done by Leslie-Ann Thomson. Production was done by Antler and VFX by SHED. ( Page will play audio when loaded)

=== Concept ===
The music video for "Catch" continues the GIF theme in its cinematography by inclusion of jittering frames. Despite some of the violent imagery, there is no gore present. It begins with Hughes seen standing on a spinning platform with a piano, and she is wearing glasses with pink flowers in place of lenses. It eventually moves on to jittering between her lying on a sofa, with an eyeball filling her open mouth, and her lying nude on the floor, covered by a pile of mannequin parts. Next is a room filled with mirrors, a legless mannequin that appears to be undergoing emesis, and standing upon a chair a cloaked figure. The following few scenes depict her as: nude with open anatomy made of plastic organs; having a missing torso that has been replaced with a rotating circle with an X through it; levitating and being skewered by some kind of needles; and as being divided into body segments like arms, torsos, and legs, and strewn about an empty pool. The video ends with a monarch chrysalis hatching from inside her mouth.

== Promotion ==
The song was performed live for the first time in a stripped down acoustic version for Nylon magazine.

== Track listing ==
Catch (single)
No.	Title	Writer(s)	Producer(s)	Length
1.	"Catch"	Alexandra Hughes; Steve McKay; Kieran Adams; Graham Bertie; Michael Wise; Alex Puodziukas	Hughes; Wise	3:46

Catch (EP)
No.	Title	Writer(s)	Producer(s)	Length
1.	"Catch"	Hughes; McKay; Adams; Bertie; Wise; Puodziukas	Hughes; Wise	3:45
2.	"Never Enough"	Hughes; Wise	Hughes; Wise	3:58
3.	"Prime"	Hughes; Wise	Hughes; Wise	4:13
4.	"Catch (Kat Krazy Remix)"			3:44

== Chart history ==
Chart (2014)	Peak position
Canada Hot 100 (Billboard)	55
Canada CHR/Top 40 (Billboard)	17
Canada Hot AC (Billboard)	34
