= Kofi Lockhart-Adams =

English footballer

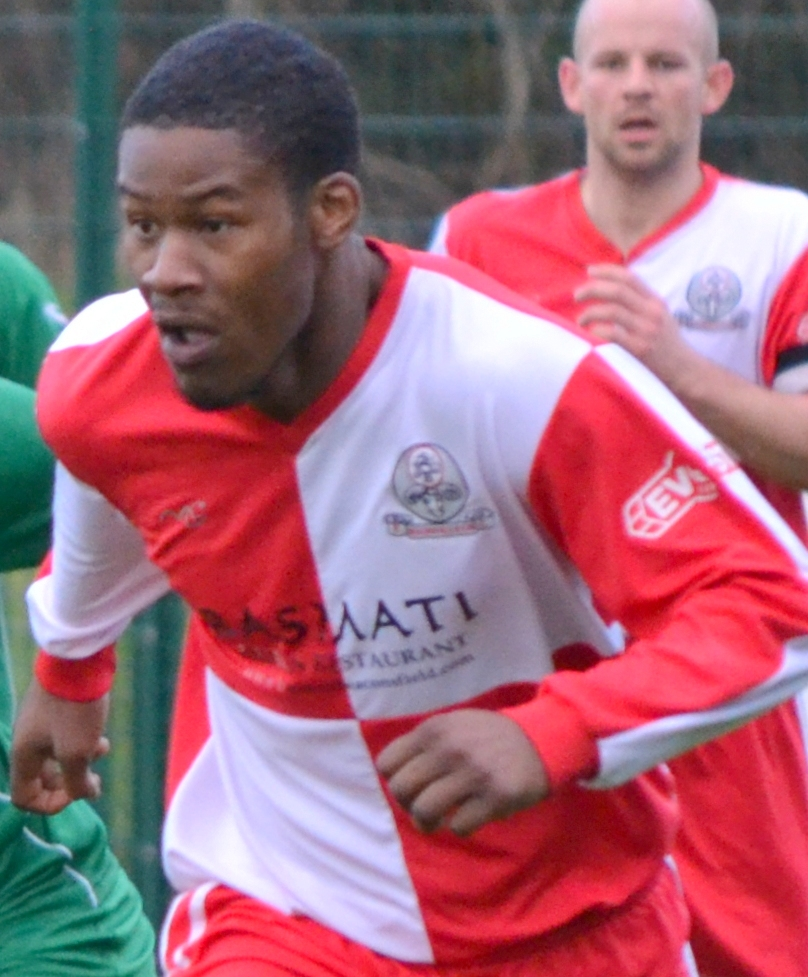
- Lockhart-Adams playing for Beaconsfield in 2015

Personal information
- Full name: Kofi Wesley Lockhart-Adams
- Date of birth: 9 October 1992 (age 34)
- Place of birth: London, England
- Position: Striker

Team information
- Current team: Cam Valley Reserves

Youth career
- Reading
- Leyton Orient
- –2009: Barnet

Senior career*
Years	Team	Apps	(Gls)
2009–2011	Barnet	1	(0)
2011	→ Walton Casuals (loan)		
2011	Walton Casuals		
2011	Tooting & Mitcham United		
2011–2013	Ashford Town	?	(22)
2013	Hitchin Town	1	(0)
2013	Ashford Town		
2013–2014	Beaconsfield SYCOB	26	(10)
2014–2015	Burnham	?	(2)
2015	Beaconsfield SYCOB	15	(4)
2015–2017	Chalfont St Peter	50	(13)
2017	Egham Town	7	(0)
2017	Beaconsfield Town	8	(1)
2017	→ Holmer Green (dual registration)	3	(0)
2018	Aylesbury United	1	(0)
2018	Spelthorne Sports	12	(1)
2018–2019	Ashford Town (Middlesex)	29	(3)
- * Club domestic league appearances and goals as of 22:15, 27 April 2019 (UTC)

Kofi Wesley Lockhart-Adams (born 9 October 1992) is an English footballer who plays as a forward.

== Career ==
=== Youth ===
Lockhart-Adams began his career in the youth teams at Reading and Leyton Orient, before joining Barnet's youth team.

=== Barnet ===
In November 2009, Lockhart-Adams was called up to the Barnet first team after a series of injuries to the first-team squad. He made his debut, aged 17 years and 42 days, in a 5–1 defeat at Cheltenham Town to become Barnet's youngest ever Football League player. Lockhart-Adams beat the previous record by 25 days, set by Kieran Adams in December 1994, but lost the record to 16-year-old Mauro Vilhete in May 2010.

In February 2011, Lockhart-Adams was loaned to Isthmian Division One South club Walton Casuals in a bid for senior football. Spending the remainder of the season with the club, he went on to score four times in 11 appearances.

Upon his return to Barnet at the end of the 2010–11 season, Lockhart-Adams was released by the club. His substitute cameo went on to become his only first team appearance for the Bees.

=== Isthmian League ===
In August 2011, Lockhart-Adams re-joined Walton Casuals. He made just two appearances before joining Isthmian Premier Division side Tooting & Mitcham United for a brief spell.

He then joined Ashford Town for the latter half of the 2011–12 season, scoring 12 goals in 24 appearances. Lockhart-Adams notably scored all four Ashford goals in a 4–4 draw with Northwood in the Middlesex Charity Cup, having come on as a half-time substitute with his team 3-0 down. He then scored the winning penalty to lift the trophy.

=== Southern League ===
In August 2013, Lockhart-Adams joined Hitchin Town. After three appearances in the Southern Premier Division, he returned to Ashford Town after manager Mark Burke was unable to offer the forward regular first team football.

In November 2013, he joined Beaconsfield SYCOB and made an immediate impact with a goal 21 minutes into his debut. Lockhart-Adams remained with the club for the season.

Following Gary Meakin's departure to join Burnham as manager, Lockhart-Adams following his former boss to the Southern Premier Division club in August 2014.

In January 2015, he returned to Beaconsfield SYCOB for a second spell, once again following Meakin after his return as manager. Lockhart-Adams went on to score four times in 15 appearances.

In August 2015, he joined Southern Division One Central side, Chalfont St Peter. Becoming a first-team regular throughout the 2015-16 campaign, Lockhart-Adams committed to a second season with the club in July 2016.

In March 2017, Lockhart-Adams joined Egham Town, before joining Beaconsfield Town for 2017–18. Later that season, he played for Holmer Green, Aylesbury United and Spelthorne Sports. In August 2018, he joined Ashford Town (Middlesex).
