= Happiness Is Going to Get You =

Studio album by Allie X
- Released: November 7, 2025
- Genre: Chamber pop
- Length: 35:39
- Label: Allie X Music LLC
- Producer: Allie X

Allie X chronology
Girl with No Face (2024)	Happiness Is Going to Get You (2025)

Singles from Happiness Us Going to Get You
- 1. "Is Anybody Out There?" Released: September 12, 2025; 2. "Reunite" Released: October 9, 2025

Happiness Is Going to Get You is the fourth studio album by the Canadian singer-songwriter Allie X. It was released on November 7, 2025, under her own label Allie X Music LLC.

== Background and composition ==
Happiness Is Going to Get You was announced by Allie X on October 9, 2025. Having self-produced and written most of the album on the piano, Allie X explained in a statement that the album "explores the idea of existing in multiple places in time, weaving baroque instrumentation with digital production to reflect a world caught between nostalgia, hope, and dread." In an interview with Paper Magazine, Allie X stated that the creation process of the album was similar to her previous album Girl with No Face (2024), stating: "I really found my voice over the past five years, by working in isolation and taking over creative and managerial control over everything. [...] In that way, [Happiness Is Going to Get You is] similar to Girl With No Face [creatively], since it's rebellious and has the same ethos. Like I'm ignoring all trends, I don't care what anyone else is doing, I don't care what they think of it. For better or for worse. That's how I'm going to sustain my career. It's very important that I found that. Sonically, it's very different. Maybe you could tie it to Cape God. It's more of an organic sound, even though there are synthesizers over all of my work."

== Promotion ==
The album was preceded by the release of two singles. The first single, "Is Anybody Out There?", was released on September 12, 2025 alongside a visualizer for it directed by Cal McIntyre. The second single, "Reunite", was released on October 9, 2025, in tandem with the album announcement. Allie X stated in a press release that the song was about "coming back together as a person when life has broken you apart", further elaborating that the lyricism was a chronicalization of the "celebration of growing up and understanding that my body has always been on my side, despite feeling the opposite for most of my life".

== Track listing ==
All tracks are written by Alexandra Hughes, with additional co-writers noted below where applicable.

Happiness Is Going to Get You track listing
No.	Title	Writer(s)	Length
1.	"Is Anybody Out There?"	Bram Inscore; George Pimentel	3:48
2.	"7th Floor"	Pimentel	2:39
3.	"Down Season"		3:16
4.	"Reunite"		3:54
5.	"A Glitch in Marie"	Bastian Langebaek	0:26
6.	"Happiness Is Going to Get You"		3:31
7.	"I Hope You Hear This Song"	Langebaek	2:35
8.	"Uncle Lenny"		3:22
9.	"It Gets Better (It's Worse Than Ever)"		0:45
10.	"Learn to Cry"		3:53
11.	"Stay Green"		3:39
12.	"It's Just Light"	Langebaek; Chris Lyon; Kyle Shearer; Nate Campany	3:51
Total length:			35:39
