= Love Me Wrong =

Single by Allie X featuring Troye Sivan

from the album Cape God
- Released: December 6, 2019
- Genre: Pop
- Length: 3:12
- Songwriters: Alexandra Hughes; Troye Mellet; Brett McLaughlin; Bram Inscore

Allie X singles chronology
"Regulars" (2019)	"Love Me Wrong" (2019)	"Devil I Know" (2020)

Troye Sivan singles chronology
"I'm So Tired..." (2019)	"Love Me Wrong" (2019)	"Take Yourself Home" (2020)

Visualiser
- "Love Me Wrong" on YouTube

"Love Me Wrong" is a song by Canadian singer Allie X featuring Australian singer-songwriter Troye Sivan. It was released on December 6, 2019 as the fourth single from Allie X's second studio album, Cape God (2020).

In a statement released with the new song, Allie X said that she wanted to convey what it felt like to be fundamentally "misunderstood" by your family while growing up. Allie X said "You know that they love you, but not for the full person you are. The relationship between a parent and child is so intense and layered, that it was liberating to put it into the simple phrase 'you love me wrong' and repeat it over and over in the chorus of this song."

== Critical reception ==
Writing for Vice, Daisy Jones stated that "'Love Me Wrong' is a rich, sumptuous slice of pop, filled with layered synth and lyrics that take bittersweet turns".

All Noise said the "It's a powerful song and both the collaborators have laid their vocals perfectly over an adorable production" calling the collaboration "nothing less than magnificent."
