= Weird World (magazine) =

British pulp magazine

Cover of the first issue; art is by Roger Davis

Weird World was a British pulp magazine that published two issues in 1955 and 1956. The publisher was Gannet Press (Sales) Ltd, owned by Merseyside Press, who had taken over Gannet Press after Gannet's bankruptcy in 1954. Science fiction historians Mike Ashley and Steve Holland consider that the magazine had promise, citing Konstantin Faber's "The Man Who Loved Cats" from the first issue as a competent story. The second issue appeared in January 1956; it included one reprint, "The Fall of the House of Usher", by Edgar Allan Poe. Both issues were illustrated by Roger Davis. A companion magazine, Fantastic World, was advertised, but in February 1956 Gannet's printers went on strike, and no more issues appeared.

== Bibliographic details ==
Weird World published two issues, in October 1955 and January 1956. The editor is unknown but may have been Benjamin Emmanuel. The publisher was Gannet Press (Sales) Ltd, of Birkenhead, UK. Both issues were pulp-sized, saddle-stapled, 48 pages, and priced at 1/-.

== Sources ==
- Ashley, Mike; Holland, Steve (1985). "Weird World". In Tymn, Marshall B.; Ashley, Mike (eds.). Science Fiction, Fantasy and Weird Fiction Magazines. Westport, Connecticut: Greenwood Press. pp. 736–737. ISBN 0-3132-1221-X.
