= Girl with No Face =

- Standard edition cover

Studio album by Allie X
- Released: February 23, 2024
- Genres: Pop; synth-pop; electropop; glam rock; avant-pop
- Length: 43:32
- Labels: Twin Music; AWAL
- Producer: Allie X

Allie X chronology
Cape God (2020)	Girl with No Face (2024)	Happiness Is Going to Get You (2025)

Singles from Girl with No Face
- 1. "Black Eye" Released: October 13, 2023; 2. "Girl with No Face" Released: November 16, 2023; 3. "Off with Her Tits" Released: January 18, 2024; 4. "Weird World" Released: February 21, 2024

Alternative cover
- Deluxe edition cover

Singles from Girl with No Face (Deluxe)
- 1. "Bon Voyage" Released: October 3, 2024

Girl with No Face is the third studio album by Canadian singer Allie X, released on February 23, 2024, by Twin Music and distributed by AWAL. The album was nearly entirely written and produced by Allie X during the four years following her previous studio album, Cape God (2020), and received acclaim from music critics.

== Background and composition ==
On February 21, 2020, Allie X released her second studio album, Cape God and intended to embark on a concert tour to promote it. After the COVID-19 lockdowns forced her to postpone the concerts, she began working on the album in the summer of the same year. Allie X first announced the album in Rolling Stone on November 16, 2023, describing it as "aggressive, indulgent and bold." On the creation of the album the singer said, "I'm not going to be trying to please anyone else, because there's literally no one else in this room. I may have created something that's completely off-trend here, but it's definitely something that I enjoy." The album's title, cover, and music videos allude to an overarching theme of identity, with Allie X saying "I feel like there was a sort of death that happened, like an erasure of maybe previous identities, and rather than emerging with a fully-formed new identity, I feel like I'm still in progress, I'm figuring it out. I like the idea that masks are flexible in that way. They're a protection. I'm starting to think that maybe that's the way that I want to go through life."

The album features a synthesizer-heavy retro pop sound inspired by the 1980s and late 1970s, with comparisons drawn to Depeche Mode, Joy Division, Cocteau Twins, Blondie, Vince Clarke, Kate Bush, Madonna, Kraftwerk, A-ha, the Human League, the B-52s, and Talking Heads. Synth-pop features prominently on songs like "Weird World", "Truly Dreams", "John and Jonathan", while "Hardware Software" and "Truly Dreams" explore new wave and disco, respectively.

== Critical reception ==
Professional ratings
Aggregate scores
Source	Rating
Metacritic	85/100
Review scores
Source	Rating
AllMusic	4.5/5 stars
DIY	4/5 stars
The Line of Best Fit	9/10
Slant Magazine	3.5/5 stars

Upon release, Girl with No Face was met with acclaim from music critics. At Metacritic, which assigns a normalised rating out of 100 to reviews from mainstream critics, the album has an average score of 85, based on seven reviews, indicating "universal acclaim".

Reviewing the album for AllMusic, Neil Z. Yeung declared that the album was, "Heavy on the '80s influence, it's both nostalgic and futuristic, placing Allie X into the sonic tradition that she used for inspiration. A revelatory experience that's somehow been hidden within her all these years, Girl with No Face is a bold reclamation of artistic self from a thrilling pop auteur." DIY writer Otis Robinson described the album as, "Like a thespian Transylvanian vampire in leathery gay bars, on third album Girl with No Face, Allie X careens through ghoulish '80s glam rock, weaving together sounds of the analogue, the synthetic and the theatrical: an energetic retrospection to digest all the mundane, vulgar, maddening and unsettling future contemporaneity she faces". Tom Kingsley of The Line of Best Fit praised the albums retro 80s sound, writing that "Pastiche is a risk for many artists, but for Hughes it's an opportunity, giving her unsettling, shape-shifting persona full command" and that, "if Cape God felt like Hughes beginning to create her own universe, Girl with No Face marks her apotheosis as her deity."

In the review for Slant Magazine, Dana Poland compared the album to Hughes' previous releases: "Almost every song on Girl with No Face was written and produced by Hughes, and this creative autonomy gives the album a personal touch that past releases like 2017's CollXtion II lacked. The songs here are imbued with an obvious newfound strength and confidence.

The album was a longlisted nominee for the 2024 Polaris Music Prize.

== Track listing ==
Credits adapted from Apple Music.

Girl with No Face track listing
No.	Title	Writer(s)	Length
1.	"Weird World"	Alexandra Hughes	3:58
2.	"Girl with No Face"	Hughes; George Pimentel	4:23
3.	"Off with Her Tits"	Hughes	3:16
4.	"John and Jonathan"	Hughes; Yannick Lecomte	4:22
5.	"Galina"	Hughes	4:30
6.	"Hardware Software"	Hughes	2:28
7.	"Black Eye"	Hughes; Pimentel	4:32
8.	"You Slept on Me"	Hughes	4:11
9.	"Saddest Smile"	Hughes	3:07
10.	"Staying Power"	Hughes	4:12
11.	"Truly Dreams"	Hughes; Pimentel	4:33
Total length:			43:32

Deluxe edition track listing
No.	Title	Writer(s)	Length
12.	"Bon Voyage"	Hughes; Pimentel	3:24
13.	"Galina" (featuring Empress Of)	Hughes	4:30
14.	"Our Lady of Sorrows"	Hughes; Ebba Tove Elsa Nilsson	4:43
15.	"Weird World" (featuring Vestron Vulture)	Hughes	2:56
16.	"Off with Her Tits" (featuring TR/ST)	Hughes	3:14
17.	"Staying Power" (featuring Dionnysuss)	Hughes	2:39
18.	"Weird World" (featuring Sidewalks and Skeletons)	Hughes	3:47
19.	"Bon Voyage" (Portuguese Version)	Hughes	3:26
20.	"Truly Dreams" (featuring Slowz)	Hughes	4:29
21.	"Galina" (Piano Version)	Hughes	4:24

Notes

- On physical copies of the album, "Hardware Software" is stylized as "Hardware/Software".

== Personnel ==
Credits adapted from Apple Music.

- Allie X – lead vocals, production
- George Pimentel – electric guitar (1, 2, 4–11)
- Lecomte de Brégeot – production (4)
- Justin Meldal-Johnsen – additional production
- Mike Schuppan – engineering
- Tony Hoffer – mixing
- Dave Cooley – mastering
- Marcus Cooper – photography

== Charts ==
Chart performance for Girl with No Face
Chart (2024)	Peak position
Scottish Albums (Official Charts)	78
UK Independent Albums (Official Charts)	13
