= Phlake =

Danish R&B musical group

- Official artwork of Phlake

Background information
- Origin: Albertslund, Denmark
- Genres: R&B; soul
- Years active: 2010–present
- Labels: Sony Music
- Members: Mads Bo; Jonathan Elkær
- Website: http://phlakemansion.com

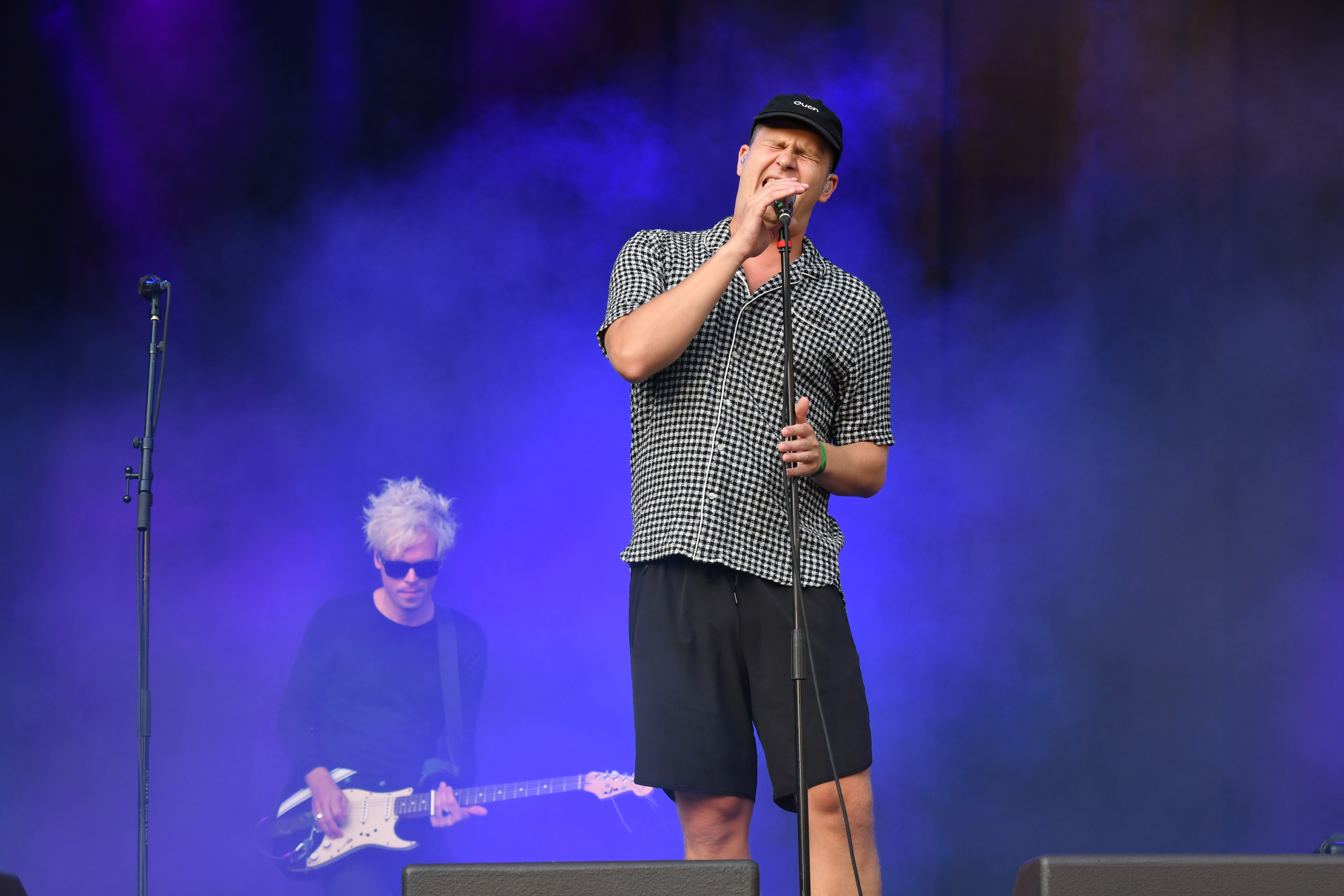
Phlake at Malmöfestivalen, Sweden, 2018.

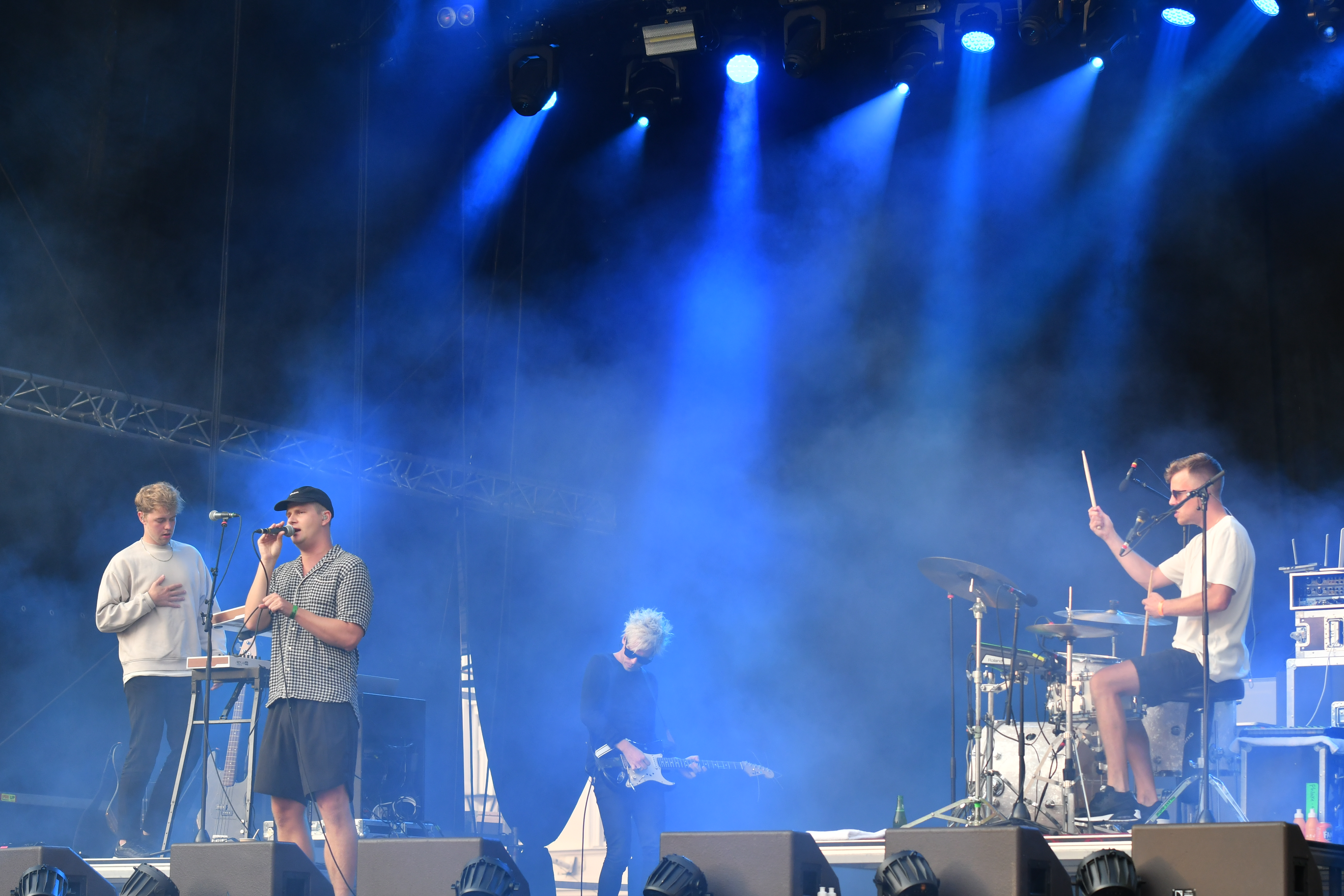
Phlake at Malmöfestivalen, Sweden, 2018.

Phlake is a Danish R&B and soul group, consisting of Mads Bo (vocals) and Jonathan Elkær (beats). The group released their first single in 2015, called "So Faded", which had some success in Denmark, but did not enter the official single chart. However on 16 October 2015, the single "Pregnant" was released and entered the Danish singles chart at number 9. The official international music video for "Pregnant" was released on YouTube by Sony Music on 11 March 2016. The video was also released in several countries, with the song gaining recognition in Sweden. They have also played at Norwegian music festival By:Larm.

== History ==
The group was created in 2015 when Jonathan Elkær, a member of Tabu Records and creating beats for Danish band Suspekt, wanted to do something new. He then met singer, Mads Bo. Together, they paired up and called themselves Phlake. An R&B group with elements of soul, the group has achieved several successful singles in Denmark.

== Discography ==
=== Albums ===
Year	Album	Peak chart positions
Year	Album	DEN
2016	Slush Hours	4
2017	Weird Invitations	1
2020	The Illegal Download of Your Soul (with Mercedes the Virus)	4
2022	Phine	6

=== Singles ===
Title	Year	Peak chart positions	Album
Title	Year	DEN	Album
"Pregnant"	2015	9	Slush Hours
"Angel Zoo"	2016	3	Slush Hours
"Chunks"	2017	—	Weird Invitations
"Ouch"	2017	—	Weird Invitations
"Gone" (with Alina Baraz)	2017	—	Weird Invitations
"IKEA Episodes"	2017	31	Weird Invitations
"Vendetta"	2021	36	TBA

=== Album content ===
Year	Album title	Songs (in order)
2016	Slush Hours	"Costa Rica", "Angel Zoo", "Like You", "May Be", "Pregnant", "Moldavia", "Stallin'", "Something Better", "Breakup Business", "So Faded", "New Slow", "Dress Off"
2017	Weird Invitations	"A Weird Invitation", "Green Screen Holiday", "Chunks", "IKEA Episodes", "The Rascal", "Gazette", "I Don't Wanna Die Sane", "Gone", "Brush", "Can We Talk", "maybeDOTcom", "Ouch", "Kerosene"
2020	The Illegal Download Of Your Soul	"Babe", "Sleepwalker (feit. Awinbeh)", "Waited All Summer", "Baby Steps", "Aliens Need Love Too", "Slip Away", "T.I.D.O.Y.S. (prelude)", "T.I.D.O.Y.S.", "My Feature", "I Could", "Breathe U In", "Silly Dancer", "URL'swhere"
