= Early Twenties Torture =

Studio album by Sadie Jean
- Released: October 24, 2025
- Genres: Indie pop, alternative pop, soft pop
- Length: 34:47
- Label: Sadie Jean
- Producers: Griff Clawson; Sadie Jean; Lixa; Myles Avery; Johnny Simpson; Austin Ward

Sadie Jean discography chronology
Simple Like 17 (2024)	Early Twenties Torture (2025)

Singles from Early Twenties Torture
- 1. "The One That I Want (But I Don’t Know Why)" Released: 8 April 2025; 2. "I Tried" Released: 18 July 2025; 3. "Slow Burn" Released: 12 September 2025; 4. "Move On First" Released: 10 October 2025

Early Twenties Torture is the debut studio album by American singer Sadie Jean. The album was released on October 24, 2025.

== Background ==
When Erica Campbell of PAPER asked, "what are you excited to share next?" in December 2024, Sadie Jean replied she was working on her debut album and was currently exploring the theme of “almost” relationships, which was a recurring theme in her life.

Jean officially announced the album was coming in 2025 when she released the lead single "The One That I Want (But I Don't Know Why)" on April 8, 2025.

== Touring ==
In 2025, Sadie Jean is also performing her headlining tour dubbed the "Early Twenties Tourture" tour. The tour begins in November 2025 in Europe.

== Promotion ==
"The One That I Want (But I Don't Know Why)" was released on April 8, 2025, as the album's first single. "I Tried", "Slow Burn", and "Move On First" were released July 18, September 12, and October 10, respectively as the album's second, third, and fourth singles.

Jean performed "I Tried" live for Flood Magazine in their "Neighborhoods" series. The performance takes place in the backseat of a car as it drives around the LA suburbs with Jean's band member Andrew Wholf playing guitar.

Sadie Jean released five music videos along with the album, which often feature her artist friends. Including the music video, for "The One That I Want (But I Don't Know Why)" which co-stars Jean's friends and roommates (including fellow artists Bebe Stockwell, Devon Gabriella, Lindsey Lomis, and Bailey Mendelson). The "Know You Forever" music video includes Sami Rappoport from Pen15, Charles Hsu, and Grace Enger.

== Critical reception ==
Anthony Mclaude of All Music Magazine wrote, "What's so piercing is her control. Sadie Jean gives us a line, "I'm pouring tears in a paper cut," a line that lands like mascara running in a bathroom stall at 2 a.m. It's more than just sadness. It's cinematic. The kind of sadness that feels both too much and not enough, like crying over someone who'll never know what they meant to you."

Jillian Giandurco of Nylon felt that Jean's soft vocals were like a gentle hug, and the vivid vignettes she creates with her lyrics are sure to give you a whole new appreciation for your own ride-or-die friendships. Continuing that "'I'm pouring tears into paper cuts' from 'I Tried' is 'kind of a generational breakup lyric'."

Clare Gelich of Melodic described Jean as baring her soul and embracing the most jealous, immature and insecure parts of herself on the album.

== Track listing ==
Early Twenties Torture track listing
No.	Title	Writer(s)	Producer(s)	Length
1.	"I Tried"	Sadie Jean; Johnny Simpson; Jake Torrey; David Alexander	Griff Clawson	2:33
2.	"Somebody's Everything"	Jean; Clawson; Bill Maybury; JKash	Clawson	3:23
3.	"Slow Burn"	Jean; Lisa Hickox; Gabe Reali	Clawson; Lixa	3:13
4.	"Move On First"	Jean; Charlie Oriain; Myles Avery; David Brook	Avery	2:36
5.	"I Don't Know Better"	Jean; Clawson; Torrey	Jean; Clawson	2:40
6.	"She's Dating My Boyfriend"	Jean; Simpson; Torrey; Clawson	Simpson; Clawson	2:20
7.	"Out Of My Body"	Jean; Clawson; Morgan Nagler	Jean; Clawson	3:42
8.	"The One That I Want (But I Don't Know Why)"	Jean; Clawson; Grace Enger	Jean; Clawson	2:35
9.	"I Miss My Friend"	Jean	Jean; Clawson	2:50
10.	"This Time Around"	Jean; Austin Ward	Ward; Clawson	2:49
11.	"Know You Forever"	Jean; Clawson	Jean; Clawson	3:12
12.	"See you on Sunday"	Jean; JP Saxe; Clawson	Clawson	2:51
Total length:				34:47

== Personnel ==
Musicians

- Sadie Jean – lead vocals (all tracks)
- Charlie Oriain – guitar (track 2)
- JP Saxe – piano (track 12)

Production

- Griff Clawson – executive producer, production (tracks 1–3 and 5–12)
- Lixa – co-production (track 3)
- Myles Avery – production (track 4)
- Sadie Jean – co-production (tracks 5, 7–9, 11)
- Johnny Simpson – co-production (track 6)
- Austin Ward – co-production (track 10)

Technical

- Joe Zook – mixing (tracks 1, 8)
- Pedro Calloni – mixing (tracks 2–7, 10–12)
- Theo Quayle – mastering (all tracks)
