= Sadie Jean =

American singer-songwriter (born 2002)

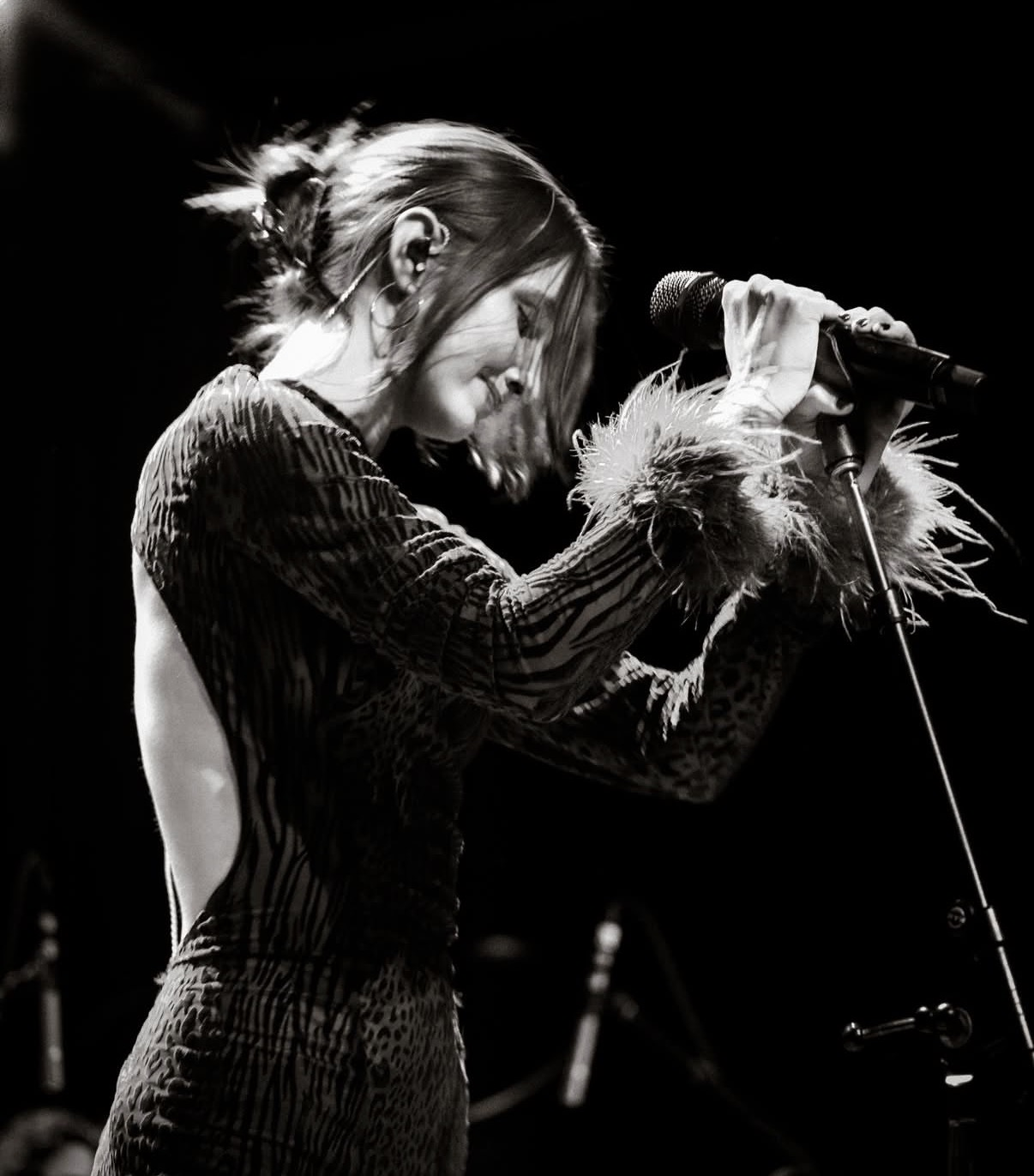
- Sadie Jean at Brooklyn Paramount in 2026

Background information
- Born: Sadie Jean Wilcox; May 15, 2002 (age 24); Tustin, California, U.S.
- Genre: Pop
- Occupations: Singer; songwriter
- Instruments: Vocals; guitar; piano
- Years active: 2021–present
- Label: Avex - Selene (2021-2022)
- Website: sadiejean.com

Sadie Jean Wilcox (born May 15, 2002) is an American singer-songwriter. She has released one EP, Simple Like 17 (2023) and one studio album, Early Twenties Torture (2025).

== Life and career ==
Sadie Jean was born in Tustin, California. According to her family, she devised songs before she could talk and had her sister write down lyrics before she could write. Starting when she was in the first grade, she took piano lessons, and later took vocal lessons and learned to play the guitar. She participated in a local theater. She attended Foothill High School, where she participated in the school choir.

Wilcox was encouraged by her brother to release music after he heard her perform a cover of Radiohead's song "Creep" after her sophomore year of high school. She then posted her music to SoundCloud. The first song she posted was written about her first boyfriend who cheated on her; she posted the song online as revenge.

In 2020, Wilcox enrolled in the Clive Davis Institute of Recorded Music at the New York University Tisch School of the Arts, where she focused on songwriting and wrote up to three songs per day.

In October 2021, Wilcox wrote the song "WYD Now?" with fellow New York University students Grace Enger and David Alexander. The song became a viral video on TikTok while Wilcox was taking final exams. She was unable to concentrate on her studies and dropped out of college to pursue her music career.

Rod Wave's song "2018", released in 2023, sampled Wilcox's song "WYD Now?". The song reached number 61 on the Billboard Hot 100 which was Jean's first time on the Billboard charts

Sadie Jean released her first EP "Simple Like 17" on December 1, 2023. The seven-track project features highly-personal songs and builds on the melodies showcased in "WYD Now?" and explores themes of breakups and growing pains.

People named her as a 2024 Spring emerging artist.

Her debut album, Early Twenties Torture, was self-released in October 2025.

== Artistry ==
Sadie Jean sites Keane, Coldplay, Young The Giant, Katy Perry, Joni Mitchell, Taylor Swift, and Phoebe Bridgers as influences. Her songwriting is described as "confessional".

== Tours ==
=== Headlining ===
- Simple Like 17 (2024)
- Early Twenties Tour-ture (2025)

=== Supporting ===
- Johnny Orlando (2023)
- Cian Ducrot (2023)
- Rod Wave (2023)
- Snow Patrol (2024)
- Lauren Spencer Smith (2026)
- Ruel (singer) (2026)

== Discography ==
=== Studio albums ===
Title	Album details
Early Twenties Torture	Released: October 24, 2025; Label: Self-released; Formats: Digital download, streaming

=== Extended plays ===
Title	EP details
Simple Like 17	Released: December 1, 2023; Label: Self-released; Formats: Digital download, streaming

=== Singles ===
List of singles, with year released, selected chart positions, and album name shown
Title	Year	Peak chart positions				Certification	Album
Title	Year	UK	CAN	NZ Hot	SWE Heat.	Certification	Album
"WYD Now?"	2021	81	91	34	—	BPI: Silver; RIAA: Gold	Simple Like 17
"Locksmith"	2022	—	—	27	—		Simple Like 17
"Just Because"	2023	—	—	—	14		Simple Like 17
"16"	2023	—	—	—	—		Non-album single
"Aisle 6"	2024	—	—	—	—		Simple Like 17 (Deluxe)
"You Don't"	2024	—	—	—	—		Simple Like 17 (Deluxe)
"Nice Knowing You"	2024	—	—	—	—		Non-album single
"The One That I Want (But I Don't Know Why)"	2025	—	—	—	—		Early Twenties Torture
"I Tried"	2025	—	—	—	—		Early Twenties Torture
"Slow Burn"	2025	—	—	—	—		Early Twenties Torture
"Move On First"	2025	—	—	—	—		Early Twenties Torture
"—" denotes a recording that did not chart or was not released in that territory.
