= Allie X =

Canadian musician (born 1985)

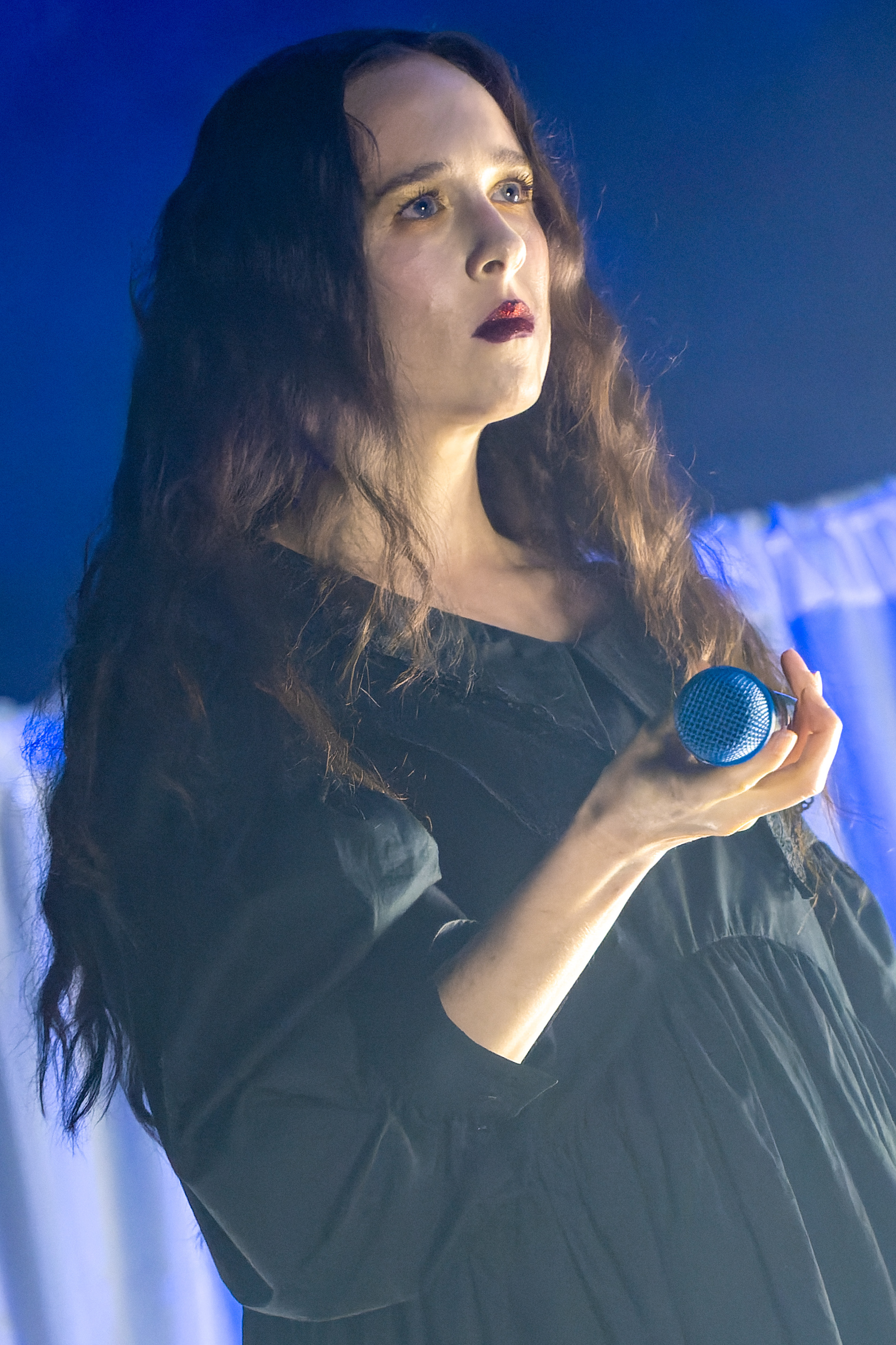
- Allie X in 2022

Background information
- Born: Alexandra Ashley Hughes; 31 July 1985 (age 41); Oakville, Ontario, Canada
- Genres: Indie pop; synth-pop; electropop; avant-garde pop; electro-goth
- Occupations: Singer-songwriter; producer; actress; model
- Instruments: Vocals; piano; synthesizer
- Works: Discography
- Years active: 2006-present
- Labels: Sleepless; Label X; Universal; Twin Music Inc.; Sony Music Canada; Allie X Canada; AWAL
- Website: alliex.com

Alexandra Ashley Hughes (born 31 July 1985), known professionally as Allie X, is a Canadian singer-songwriter, producer, and visual artist. She began her career as an indie pop artist in Toronto in the mid-2000s, playing with local bands and recording several albums.

After relocating to Los Angeles in 2013, Hughes began working with music producers Cirkut and Billboard and first achieved commercial success with her 2014 single "Catch", which peaked at number 55 on the Canadian Hot 100 chart. She has since released the extended plays CollXtion I (2015) and Super Sunset (2018), and the studio albums CollXtion II (2017), Cape God (2020), Girl with No Face (2024), and Happiness Is Going To Get You (2025).

== Early life ==
Alexandra Ashley Hughes was born on 31 July 1985, in the town of Oakville, Ontario. Her father is of British descent. Raised in an upper-middle-class family, she has described her upbringing as "privileged". She attended the Etobicoke School of the Arts, then studied classical piano and voice at the Interlochen Arts Academy in Michigan, and graduated from Sheridan College's Musical Theatre Performance program, and also studied musical theatre. During her adolescence, Hughes was diagnosed with an unnamed autoimmune disorder that caused her to be "small and sickly-looking." To deflect from the appearance it gave her, she began using clothes and experimenting with makeup. In college, she began smoking marijuana to cope with the condition.

== Career ==
=== 2006–2012: Career beginnings ===
Hughes first started her career under the stage name Allie Hughes in Toronto around 2006, performing indie pop, indie rock, jazz, and electronic music. After three years of studying at Sheridan, she recorded a 10-track demo album, titled Waiting for the Prize. Hughes described the CD as "a big hit with the music theatre kids", encouraging her to pursue a professional music career.

In 2008, she took part in CBC Television's How Do You Solve a Problem Like Maria?, the Canadian version based on the series with the same name which aired in the United Kingdom on BBC One in 2006. She performed "My Favourite Things" from The Sound of Music and "It's Oh So Quiet" by Björk but was eliminated from the show after two weeks. That same year, she released her second demo album.

She began recording for her debut studio album in 2009, collaborating with Dave Newfeld of Broken Social Scene, Leon Taheny, and Adam King of Run With Kittens. The album, titled The Hard Way, was initially set for release in fall 2010 but was delayed to 2011 and ultimately scrapped. During this timeframe, she released a 4-track self-titled extended play in 2010, meant to act as a preview of sorts for the then-upcoming project.

Following the cancellation of The Hard Way, Hughes developed her synth-pop and electronic inspired band, ALX, in late 2011. The group released their debut and only single, "I Will Love You More" in March 2012, although a variety of other songs were performed during live shows. ALX had their final known performance at the Hillside Festival in July, where they performed seven unreleased original songs and one cover.

Her acting credits during this time include Canadian movies and television programmes, including The Boys in the Photograph, King, Being Erica, and Instant Star; her music was featured in Rookie Blue, Saving Hope, and Love Me.

=== 2013–2015: CollXtion I ===
In March 2013, Hughes was one of four musicians to receive the Canadian Film Centre Slaight Music Residency Showcase. In July 2013, Hughes moved to Los Angeles to pursue a full-time career as a songwriter; despite this, she did not stop working on her solo material. She had not been satisfied with her sound and spent time learning about sound design and production. She adopted the stage name Allie X and began working with producers Cirkut and Billboard, whom she had met during her time in Los Angeles. Hughes eventually signed a publishing deal and moved into a house "[this company] was renting" where she "wrote song after song," fearing they would "send" her back. During this period, Hughes wrote the song "Bitch."

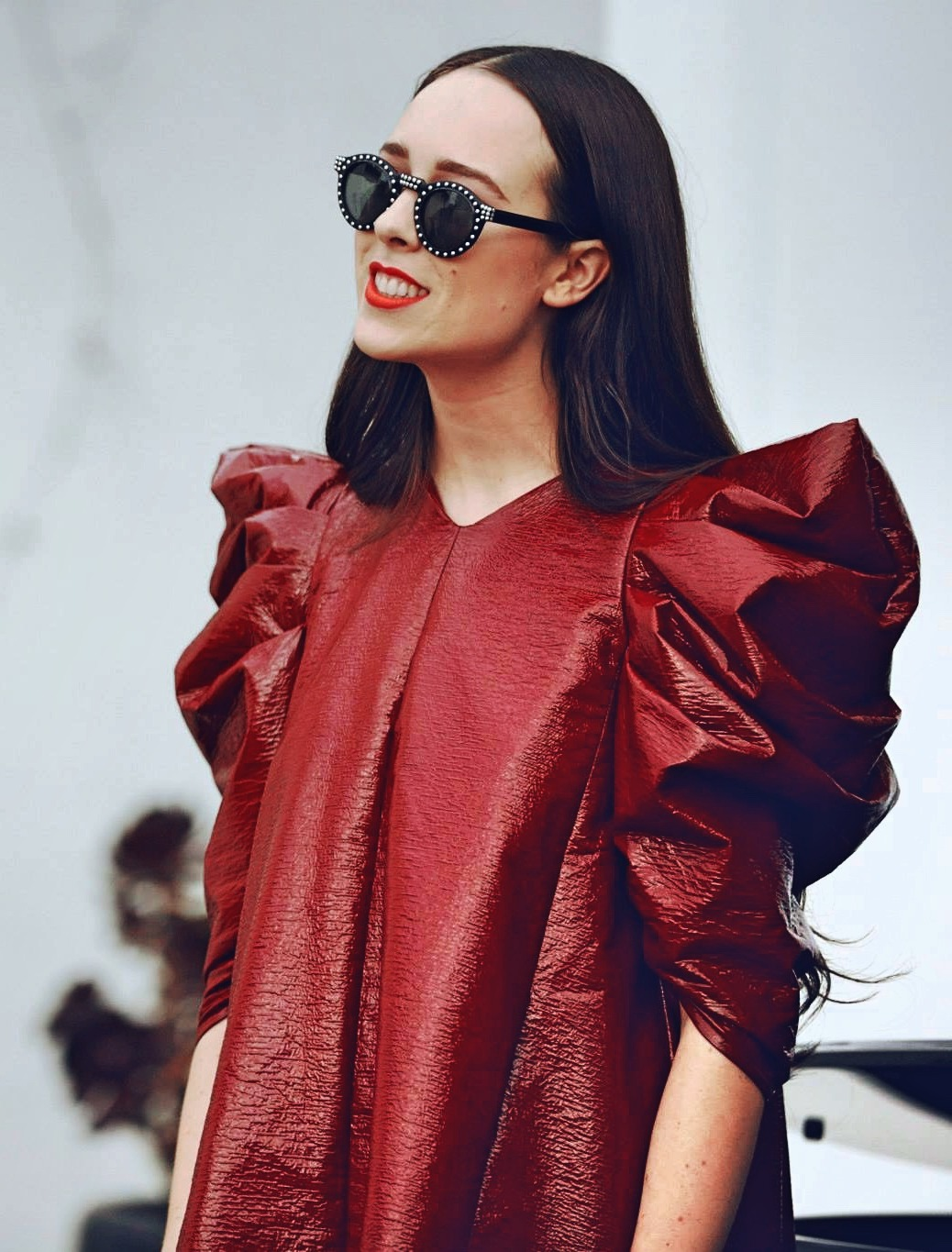
Allie X in 2015

In early 2014, Hughes released her debut single under the Allie X name, titled "Catch". Upon release, the single received praise from multiple sources including American singer-songwriter Katy Perry who called the track on Twitter, "spring jam." It charted on the Canadian Hot 100, peaking at number 55 on the chart. "Catch" went on to be re-released as an EP in November 2015, featuring additional tracks.

Prior to the release of Hughes's debut extended play, CollXtion I, two singles, "Prime" and "Bitch", were put out by the singer on 18 March – 6 April 2014, respectively. CollXtion I was then released a year later, on 7 April 2015 in Canada, with the worldwide release being pushed back to 21 April. The EP was well received and was promoted through a small North American tour in 2015.

Besides working on solo music, in 2014 and 2015, Hughes also contributed to Australian singer Troye Sivan's album Blue Neighbourhood, co-writing seven tracks, including two of the album's three singles, "Talk Me Down" and "Youth". She also supported Troye Sivan on his 2016 tour's North American leg.

=== 2016–2018: CollXtion II and Super Sunset ===
Despite having released albums and EPs in the past, Hughes had yet to release a studio album under the Allie X name. In February 2016, Hughes released a free-to-download song called "Old Habits Die Hard", which was originally meant to serve as a non-album single. On 13 May 2016, Hughes released another song called "Too Much to Dream" and announced a project called CollXtion II: Ʉnsolved, which saw her release a collection of demos and songs on Spotify over the course of the summer, in order to shortlist the songs her fans wanted to see on CollXtion II. This project ended on 6 November 2016, with Hughes saying no new music would be released until the album is out.

CollXtion II began to be teased by Hughes in February 2017, with it being officially announced for a 9 June release date on 23 February. On 28 April 2017, Hughes released "Paper Love" as the first single from the upcoming album. "Need You" was released on 26 May 2017.

On 1 June 2018, Hughes released "Focus" as the first single from her then-untitled second studio album, followed by the release of the second single "Not so Bad in LA" on 13 July. The following Monday, Hughes announced her extended play, Super Sunset, to be released in the upcoming fall, along with a four date promotional tour, The Super Sunset Xperience. On 25 December 2018, Hughes released Super Sunset Analog, an alternate version of her previously released album Super Sunset.

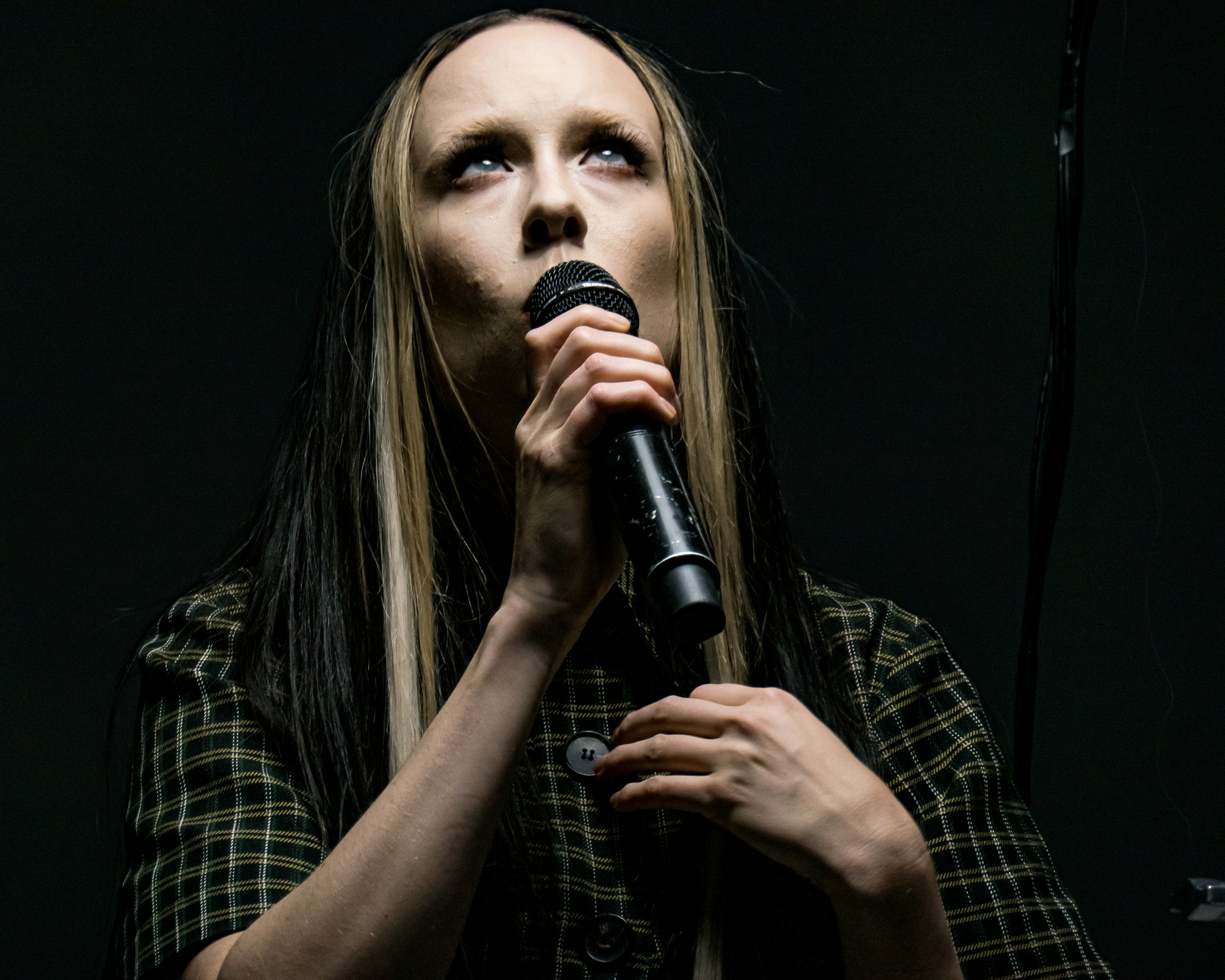
Allie X in 2019

=== 2019–present: Cape God, Girl with No Face, and Happiness Is Going To Get You ===
On 26 September 2019, Hughes released "Fresh Laundry" along with a music video for her next album that was then untitled. This was followed by "Rings a Bell" on 17 October. On 8 November, the third single, "Regulars", was released. The fourth single, a collaboration with singer-songwriter Troye Sivan, "Love Me Wrong", was released on 6 December. On 16 December, Allie announced the pre-order, album artwork, and album title for her upcoming album, Cape God, through her social media accounts. A fifth single, "Devil I Know", was released on 31 January 2020. The album was released 21 February 2020. Hughes' vocals were featured on "Shadow" by Dutch electronic music duo Vicetone, released on Canadian label Monstercat on 30 October 2020. The singer also released a collab with Mitski, "Susie Save Your Love". In 2020, she appeared as a guest host in the seventh episode of Canada's Drag Race.

She performed in the 2021 virtual edition of Pride Toronto. In July 2021, Hughes released a single with drag queen Violet Chachki, "Mistress Violet", produced by French producer Lecomte De Brégeot and written by Hughes. The song's 1980s-influenced music video was shot in analog and features Hughes and Chachki in Schiaparelli haute couture outfits. Chachki had previously appeared with Hughes in the music video for her 2016 single "All the Rage".

In November 2023, Hughes announced her third studio album Girl with No Face would be released 24 February 2024, promoted by the lead single "Black Eye" and its title track. Upon release, the album was met with acclaim from music critics. The album was a longlisted nominee for the 2024 Polaris Music Prize.

In 2025, Hughes released the singles "Is Anybody Out There?" and "Reunite," which preceded her fourth studio album Happiness Is Going To Get You, released 7 November 2025.

== Artistry ==
Hughes cites many of her influences as being ABBA, Arthur Russell, Björk, Kate Bush, Lady Gaga, Celine Dion, Cyndi Lauper, Mariah Carey, Mark Mothersbaugh, Tom Petty, and author Haruki Murakami. She also explains that the X in her name represents the unknown variable in algebra, saying: "In mathematics, X is any possible variable. It's an unknown quantity. Once it's solved, it's no longer X. With that in mind, X is the identity that I take on as I go through my journey of self-discovery. It's these questions that I'm trying to grapple with in the public sphere. If I ever find that piece that I'm after or solve the equation, as it were, then I will no longer be Allie X."

Hughes has the vocal range of a soprano, with her music having drawn frequent comparisons to British singer Ellie Goulding's, but also that of Chvrches and the Knife. Hughes describes her melodies as being "soaring pop, borderline theatrical Disney", while she says her lyrics "always seem to be darker." She compares songwriting to a science experiment in which you put two people's brains together for a few hours and see what they can come up with.

== Public advocacy ==
Hughes has frequently voiced her support for women's rights and LGBT rights, noting "I have a lot of young fans, and a lot of LGBT fans. After meeting and hugging so many of them, I often picture them when I write now, and I try to send my support".

== Awards and nominations ==
Year	Awards	Work	Category	Result	Ref.
2015	Berlin Music Video Awards	"Catch"	Best Art Direction	Nominated	
2017	APRA Music Awards	"Youth"	Pop Work of the Year	Nominated	

== Discography ==
Studio albums

- CollXtion II (2017)
- Cape God (2020)
- Girl with No Face (2024)
- Happiness Is Going To Get You (2025)

== Tours ==
Allie X opening for Magdalena Bay on their Imaginal Mystery Tour in Manchester, 2026

=== Headlining ===
- Doing X Tour (2015)
- The Collxtion II Tour (2017)
- The Super Sunset Xperience (2018)
- Girl With No Face Tour (2024)
- Weird World Tour (2024)
- Cape God Reunion Tour (2025)
- Serial Diva Tour (2026)

=== Supporting ===
- Troye Sivan - Blue Neighbourhood Tour (2016)
- Hayley Kiyoko - Expectations Tour (2018)
- ionnalee - Remember the Future Tour (2019)
- Marina - Love + Fear Tour (2019)
- Charli XCX - Charli Live Tour (2019)
- Magdalena Bay - Imaginal Mystery Tour (2026)
