= Cape God =

Studio album by Allie X
- Released: February 21, 2020
- Genres: Alternative pop; synth-pop; electropop; avant-garde pop
- Length: 43:15
- Labels: Twin Music; AWAL
- Producers: OzGo; Jens Duvsjo; Valley Girl

Allie X chronology
Super Sunset (2018)	Cape God (2020)	Girl with No Face (2024)

Singles from Cape God
- 1. "Fresh Laundry" Released: September 27, 2019; 2. "Rings a Bell" Released: October 18, 2019; 3. "Regulars" Released: November 8, 2019; 4. "Love Me Wrong" Released: December 6, 2019; 5. "Devil I Know" Released: January 31, 2020; 6. "Super Duper Party People" Released: July 10, 2020

Cape God (Deluxe)

Singles from Cape God (Deluxe)
- 1. "Anchor" Released: November 19, 2021

Cape God is the second studio album by Canadian singer Allie X. It was released on February 21, 2020 by Twin Music and distributed by AWAL. The release followed her extended play Super Sunset (2018). The album was primarily written by Allie X and James Alan Ghaleb, and produced by Oscar Görres. It received generally positive reviews from music critics.

== Background and development ==
Allie X released her extended play Super Sunset in 2018. Cape God was originally intended as a sister record to the EP, though Allie X later decided to split the project into a separate album. She contrasted her approach to writing Cape God with what she had taken for her previous releases. While she stated that her previous releases involved experimentation with "alter egos", Cape God was "a pretty personal, pretty intimate body of work". In an ask-me-anything session on Reddit, Allie X noted that "it was easier [for her] to make this record than any other" and that "[the process] happened very seamlessly."

Allie X drew inspiration for the album from the characters within Heroin: Cape Cod, USA, a 2015 documentary about the opioid epidemic in Massachusetts. She wrote songs from the point of view of one of the documentary's characters, and developed a fictionalized Cape Cod in her mind as a way to reflect on her personal experiences. She met producer Oscar Görres and songwriter James Alan Ghaleb in Stockholm, shortly after writing the opening line for the album's first track "Fresh Laundry". She described her songwriting process as "seamless, therapeutic, and very enjoyable," though she also credited Görres's production for being able to complement her "layered kind of complex lyrics". Cape God was Allie X's first album to feature vocal duets. She began work with feature artists Troye Sivan and Mitski in 2018.

The standard edition album cover photograph was shot in a cave in upstate New York by Brendon Burton, using natural light and a smoke bomb.

== Songs ==
The album opens with "Fresh Laundry", described by Sarah Shodipe from The Line Of Best Fit as lo-fi, while Stuart Derdeyn of Vancouver Sun wrote that the song had a "big booming beat, spooky vocal and splashy keyboard hook". Allie X described "Devil I Know" as about dealing with a toxic relationship; reviews described the song as catchy and as combining melodies with moodiness, and noted a strong resemblance to the Arctic Monkeys song "Why'd You Only Call Me When You're High?". "Rings a Bell" is a neo-psychedelic pop song about "falling into a rabbit hole, experiencing something surreal, in a dream, or in your subconscious perhaps".

"Love Me Wrong" is a ballad featuring Australian singer Troye Sivan. Allie X gained inspiration for the song from the 2018 coming-of-age film Boy Erased, in which Sivan played a supporting role. She noted the similarities between the film's main character and her writing process for the album. She expressed that song "deals with the confusion and hurt associated with familial love," when loved ones do not see and love your true identity. Reviews widely described "Super Duper Party People" as the album's standout track, while noting its corny title. musicOMH described it as "a bass-led anthem" with lyrics about people at "a particularly seedy nightclub", DIY said the track "perfectly displays [Allie X]'s ability to create a refreshing take on what could otherwise be by-numbers pop", while Exclaim! said the track was "hallucinogenic" with references to drugs and sex. "Susie Save Your Love", a collaboration with indie rock artist Mitski, is a pop song with drums, bass and synths and included "depressing" lyrics about a woman named Susie stuck in an unwanted relationship. Paste described Allie X and Mitski's vocals as "almost too perfect of a match", but that it was a "solid track" for dancing alone. musicOMH noted that the song "sounds unaccountably sad yet impossible not to dance to".

== Release and promotion ==
The album was preceded by the release of five singles. The lead single, "Fresh Laundry" was released on September 27, 2019. This was followed by "Rings a Bell" on October 18, 2019, "Regulars" on November 8, 2019, and "Love Me Wrong", a collaboration with Troye Sivan, on December 6, 2019. "Devil I Know" was released as the last single for the album before its release on January 31, 2020.

On September 29, 2021 Allie X announced a deluxe edition of the album, featuring five new songs and new artwork. It was released on vinyl on November 19, 2021 and digitally on November 25, 2021. "Anchor" was released as a single on the same day as the vinyl release.

== Critical reception ==
Professional ratings
Aggregate scores
Source	Rating
Metacritic	78/100
Review scores
Source	Rating
AllMusic	4/5 stars
DIY	2.5/5 stars
Exclaim!	9/10
The Line of Best Fit	9/10
musicOMH	4/5 stars
Pitchfork	6.8/10
Q	80/100

On Metacritic, which assigns a normalized rating out of 100 to reviews from mainstream publications, the album received an average score of 78 based on eight reviews, indicating "generally favorable reviews".

Corey van den Hoogenband of Exclaim! said the album "elegantly blends" Allie X's new and old styles, creating "[her] best work yet". He remarked that the instrumentals contained "a carefully crafted grit and griminess", noting that while she had used such an effect to create a "sense of impending doom" on all her work, the instrumentals on Cape God felt more communicative than her previous records. John Murphy of musicOMH said that the album had an "experimental edge" separating it from the work of other alternative pop singers like Marina Diamandis and Charli XCX, making it "one of the most delightfully weirdest albums of the year". Q magazine noted that while "Cape God might be an awful place to visit", "the tunes [on the album] are great". Eric Torres of Pitchfork described Cape God as "the strongest concept in her catalog to date".

In a more mixed review, Martin Toussaint of DIY stated that while the album was more ambitious than Allie X's previous releases, it "lacked any edge she's previously shown" and "on the whole [the album] falls short". Toussaint criticized the album for failing to "push boundaries" in the same way as did Allie X's previous works such as CollXtion I.

== Track listing ==
Credits adapted from the liner notes of Cape God and Tidal.

Cape God track listing
No.	Title	Writer(s)	Producer(s)	Length
1.	"Fresh Laundry"	Alexandra Hughes; James Alan Ghaleb; Oscar Görres	Görres	3:56
2.	"Devil I Know"	Hughes; Cara Salimando; Jonathan Saxe; Görres; Jens Duvsjo	Görres; Duvchi	2:52
3.	"Regulars"	Hughes; Ghaleb; Görres	Görres	3:41
4.	"Sarah Come Home"	Hughes; Jesse St. John Geller; Leroy Clampitt; Görres	Görres	3:33
5.	"Rings a Bell"	Hughes; Ghaleb; Görres	Görres	4:16
6.	"June Gloom"	Hughes; Ghaleb; Görres	Görres	3:09
7.	"Love Me Wrong" (with Troye Sivan)	Hughes; Troye Mellet; Brett McLaughlin; Bram Inscore	Görres	3:12
8.	"Super Duper Party People"	Hughes; George Pimentel; Görres; Oliver Goldstein	Görres	3:49
9.	"Susie Save Your Love" (with Mitski)	Hughes; Nate Campany; Kyle Shearer; Görres; Mitsuki Laycock	Görres; Valley Girl	3:58
10.	"Life of the Party"	Hughes; Jack Latham; Görres	Görres; Latham	3:31
11.	"Madame X"	Hughes; Simon Wilcox; Görres; Clampitt	Görres; Big Taste	3:30
12.	"Learning in Public"	Hughes; Ghaleb; Görres	Görres	3:48
Total length:				43:15

Cape God (Deluxe edition bonus tracks)
No.	Title	Writer(s)	Producer(s)	Length
13.	"Cape God Theme"	Hughes; Inscore; Pimentel; Laycock	Allie X; Inscore	2:10
14.	"Milk"	Hughes; Wilcox; Görres	Görres	3:30
15.	"Limited Love"	Hughes; Inscore; Laycock	Allie X; Inscore	3:41
16.	"Anchor"	Hughes; Ghaleb; Görres	Görres	3:08
17.	"Rising Tide"	Hughes; Inscore; Geller; Dallas James Koehlke	Allie X; Inscore	5:29
Total length:				61:13

== Personnel ==
Credits adapted from the liner notes of Cape God and Tidal.

=== Production and recording ===
- Allie X – vocals (all tracks); production (13, 15, 17)
- Troye Sivan – vocals (7)
- Mitski – vocals (9)
- Oscar Görres – production
- Duvchi – production (2)
- Valley Girl – production (9)
- Jack Latham – production (10)
- Big Taste – production (11)
- Bram Inscore – production (13, 15, 17)
- Clint Gibbs – mixing
- Stuart Hawkes – mastering

=== Design ===
- Brendon Burton – photography
- Skeleton Crew – production
- Lipstick Queers – makeup
- Timothy Aylward – hair
- Abigail Hayden – hair assistant
- Kieley Kimmel – styling
- Made in Katana – album layout, graphic design

== Charts ==
Sales chart performance for Cape God
Chart (2020)	Peak position
US Heatseekers Albums (Billboard)	23
US Top Current Albums (Billboard)	73

== Release history ==
Release dates and formats for Cape God
Region	Date	Format	Version	Label	References
Various	February 21, 2020	LP; CD; digital download; streaming	Standard	Twin Music; AWAL	
Various	November 19, 2021	LP	Deluxe	Twin Music; AWAL	
Various	November 25, 2021	digital download; streaming	Deluxe	Twin Music; AWAL	

== See also ==
- List of 2020 albums
