= Super Sunset =

2018 EP by Allie X

EP by Allie X
- Released: October 29, 2018
- Genre: Synthwave; dance-pop; electropop
- Length: 21:40
- Label: Twin Music

Allie X chronology
CollXtion II (2017)	Super Sunset (2018)	Cape God (2020)

Alternative cover
- Analog version cover

Singles from Super Sunset
- 1. "Focus" Released: June 1, 2018; 2. "Not So Bad in LA" Released: July 13, 2018; 3. "Science" Released: August 17, 2018; 4. "Little Things" Released: September 21, 2018; 5. "Girl of the Year" Released: October 26, 2018; 6. "Can't Stop Now" Released: November 6, 2018

Super Sunset is the fourth extended play (EP) by Canadian singer and songwriter Alexandra Hughes, known professionally as Allie X. It was released on October 29, 2018, by Twin Music. The EP follows the release of her debut studio album CollXtion II (2017), and was inspired by Hughes' tumultuous experiences since moving to Los Angeles. The concept was illustrated by three archetypes: "Sci-Fi Girl", the "Hollywood Starlet", and the "Nun".

== Singles ==
All of the tracks featured on Super Sunset, except for the intro and interlude, were released as singles; Hughes explained that she "felt a very close connection to each song" and wanted them "to have their own moments."

== Critical reception ==
Julian Baldsing of The Line of Best Fit praised Hughes' songwriting and vocals, and said "Super Sunset excels by proving that regardless of how much of Allie X the human is revealed, there’s so much more to the artist that has yet to be discovered.".

The EP was included on GQ's list of the best albums of 2018, Idolator's list of the best EPs of 2018 at number 5, and Paper listed it as the 18th best album of 2018.

== Track listing ==
Super Sunset
No.	Title	Writer(s)	Producer(s)	Length
1.	"Super Sunset Intro"	Alexandra Hughes		0:36
2.	"Not So Bad in LA"	Hughes; George Bezerra; Pierre "Chiild" Luc; Yonatan Ayal	Chiild; Jordan Palmer^{[a]}; Allie X^{[a]}	2:50
3.	"Little Things"	Hughes; Simon Wilcox; Benjamin Berger; Ryan McMahon; Ryan Rabin	Chiild; Captain Cuts; Palmer^{[a]}; Allie X^{[a]}	3:08
4.	"Science"	Hughes; Brett McLaughlin; Bezerra; Jordan Palmer; Kyle Shearer	xSDTRK; Palmer; Shearer^{[a]}	3:55
5.	"Girl of the Year"	Hughes; Jonathan Sloan; Ricky Ducati; Wilcox	Donnie Sloan; Palmer^{[a]}; xSDTRK^{[a]}	3:44
6.	"Super Sunset Interlude"	Hughes		0:37
7.	"Can't Stop Now"	Hughes; Bezerra; Joe Walter; Kalli Reinhardt; Luc; Ayal	Chiild; Palmer^{[a]}; Allie X^{[a]}	3:03
8.	"Focus"	Hughes; Jonathan Saxe; Luc; Ayal	Chiild; Palmer^{[a]}	3:47
Total length:				21:40

Super Sunset (Analog)
No.	Title	Writer(s)	Length
1.	"Not So Bad in LA" (analog version)	Hughes; Bezerra; Luc; Ayal	2:56
2.	"Little Things" (analog version)	Hughes; Captain Cuts; Wilcox	3:12
3.	"Science" (analog version)	Hughes; McLaughlin; Bezerra; Palmer; Shearer	4:07
4.	"Girl of the Year" (analog version)	Hughes; Sloan; Ducati; Wilcox	3:31
5.	"Focus" (analog version)	Hughes; Saxe; Luc; Ayal	3:59
6.	"Can't Stop Now" (digital concert)	Hughes; Bezerra; Walter; Reinhardt; Luc; Ayal	3:03
7.	"Science" (digital concert)	Hughes; McLaughlin; Bezerra; Palmer; Shearer	3:57
8.	"Girl of the Year" (digital concert)	Hughes; Sloan; Ducati; Wilcox	3:47
9.	"Little Things" (digital concert)	Hughes; Captain Cuts; Wilcox	3:11
Total length:			31:43

Notes

- "Super Sunset Intro" and "Super Sunset Interlude" contain a sample of "Local Forecast – Elevator" by Kevin MacLeod.

== Release history ==
Region	Date	Version(s)	Format(s)	Label	Ref.
Various	October 29, 2018	Standard	CD	Twin Music	
Various	October 29, 2018	Standard	Digital download; streaming	Twin Music	
Various	October 29, 2018	Standard	LP	Twin Music	
Various	January 1, 2019	Analog	Cassette	Twin Music	
Various	January 1, 2019	Analog	Digital download; streaming	Twin Music	
