= CollXtion II =

Studio album by Allie X
- Released: June 9, 2017
- Genres: Synth-pop; indie pop; dark-pop; bubblegum pop
- Length: 35:38
- Labels: Twin Music; Sony Music Canada

Allie X chronology
CollXtion I (2015)	CollXtion II (2017)	Super Sunset (2018)

Singles from CollXtion II
- 1. "Old Habits Die Hard" Released: February 3, 2016; 2. "That's So Us" Released: September 16, 2016; 3. "Paper Love" Released: April 28, 2017; 4. "Need You" Released: May 16, 2017; 5. "Casanova" Released: November 3, 2017

CollXtion II (pronounced "Collection Two") is the debut studio album by Canadian singer-songwriter Allie X, released on June 9, 2017, following her 2015 extended play, CollXtion I.

CollXtion II was the second of a planned five CollXtions, following CollXtion I, each being a unique multimedia experience that will include GIFs (particularly called "X Visuals"), which are featured in her YouTube videos, a comic detailing an abstract autobiography, and song stems to allow fans to make their own creations. However, subsequent releases were not a part of this series.

== Background ==
CollXtion II had been teased by Allie X since the original release of CollXtion I. One of the first statements mentioning the album was made on Twitter, following the release of the song "Never Enough", which fans assumed would be the lead single. On February 3, 2016, the song "Old Habits Die Hard" was released, originally as a non-album single available for free download, but was later included in the album's tracklist, as Allie X had promised to include the song once it hit 1 million plays on Spotify. During a question and answer session on social media site Tumblr, Allie X stated that the overall theme for CollXtion II would be "longing and being lost".

On May 13, 2016, after the release of "Too Much to Dream", Allie X announced the project CollXtion II: Ʉnsolved, which saw her release a collection of demos and songs on Spotify over the course of the summer, in order to shortlist the songs her fans wanted to see on CollXtion II. The songs released through the project were "Too Much to Dream", "Purge", "All the Rage", "Casanova", "That's So Us", "Misbelieving" and "Alexandra" along with the non-album single "Old Habits Die Hard". Out of these, only "Old Habits Die Hard", "Casanova" and "That's So Us" were remastered and included on the album's final track list. The project officially ended on November 6, 2016.

== Composition ==
The album opens with "Paper Love", a mid-tempo synth-pop song. Allie X stated that the reason behind the song being the first track on the album is because she felt as if it was a great introduction. "It feels like the beginning of something exciting," she stated in a video released on YouTube, in which she breaks down the creation of "Paper Love". "Paper Love" is lyrically about a lover, who is perceived as the right one, but ends up being not the person they once seemed to be, yet the love towards them doesn't want to die. "['Paper Love' is about] when you find yourself getting into [a romantic situation] that you know will rip you up and you do it anyway," Allie X said about the single. "[The term] 'paper love' [means] the kind of love that is too fragile and violent to work but still feels smooth and sexy and sharp and you can't help going forward with it. Like, 'Watch my heart turn to pulp!' It's like knowing [a situation] is going to hurt so good." The song includes a drop, built around a guitar riff and a whistle tone. "When I started to make a demo around the riff, I really started to hear a more modern [percussion], the kind of dancehall thing that's happening a lot in music," she said about the composition of the track. "I really liked the idea of having a drop, I've never really done a proper drop in any of my songs before."

Allie X describes the album's tracks as representing pieces of her. "Whether it'd be a dream, a fantasy or my interpretation of reality," she said about the tracks. "Paper Love" and many of the other songs are about that part of myself that is kind of impulsive and self-destructive, and the kind of guys I dated for a while. I know that now that I'm older a lot of that I've grown out of, but other parts I haven't [grown out of] so much. It definitely is a piece of the me that I am now."

== Release and promotion ==
My first full length record is finally in the world. This album was difficult. An incredibly fragmented two year process, by a fragmented person. This album is about the loss and hopefully reclamation of my identity. Each song is a piece of me — whether it be memory experience, projected fantasy, or my perception of current reality... Just like on the cover artwork, I am examining all the pieces and trying to put them back together... I made CollXtion II for anyone who is looking to find their place and their purpose. I hope it brings you comfort, joy and closer to your truth. Thank you so much for taking this journey with me and letting me Xpress myself.

— Allie X on CollXtion II.

On February 23, 2017, Allie X announced that the album would be released on June 9, 2017. She also stated she would be embarking on a tour, preceding the album's official release. Dates were announced in New York City, Toronto, Chicago, Los Angeles and London. Due to popular demand from fans, she later added Paris and Milan to the roster. Before the announcement of the release date, Allie X opened a CollXtion II hotline, which would play snippets of certain songs on the album to anyone who called. The first snippet played was "Paper Love", followed by "Need You", "True Love Is Violent" and "Simon Says".

== Singles ==
"Old Habits Die Hard" was released as the lead single on February 6, 2016. It was originally never intended to act as the lead single and would instead be a standalone single that wouldn't be included on the CollXtion II: Ʉnsolved tracklist, but after the release of CollXtion II: Ʉnsolved, it was released as the lead single of CollXtion II. Which meant that “Old Habits Die Hard” along with "That's So Us" and “Casanova” were the only songs that were remastered, with all three having their original versions and album reworked versions being released as the first, second and fifth singles off of CollXtion II. Upon the release, it received positive reviews from critics.

"That's So Us" was released on September 16, 2016 as the second single. It was met with positive reviews upon release. Originally included on CollXtion II: Ʉnsolved along with "Casanova", both were later remastered and released as official singles off of CollXtion II.

"Paper Love" was the album's third single, which was released digitally on April 28, 2017. Avery Stone from Noisey gave the track a favourable review, describing Allie X as "sugary-voiced", saying she doesn't "dwell on it". "Instead, the track surges forward with a whistling hook over a slinky, swaggering guitar riff—and you want more. The song echoes the situation—you're right back where you started."

"Need You" was released as the forth single from the album on May 26, 2017. The song includes the guest collaboration of Michigan-based band Valley Girl. It was launched as instant grat with the pre-order of the album on May 26.

The finalized version of "Casanova" was packaged together with pre-orders of the album, which began on February 23, 2017 and was widely misreported as the album's lead single. It was later released as the fifth official single from the album, and a new version featuring American singer Vérité was later released. A piano demo was included on the set of CollXtion II: Ʉnsolved along with "That's So Us" but both were remastered and released as official singles off of CollXtion II along with "Old Habits Die Hard" after the release of CollXtion II: Ʉnsolved.

== Track listing ==
CollXtion II
No.	Title	Writer(s)	Producer(s)	Length
1.	"Paper Love"	Alexandra Hughes; Brett McLaughlin; George Pimentel	Mike Wise; Allie X; Jordan Palmer; Billboard^{[b]}	3:16
2.	"Vintage"	Hughes; McLaughlin; Troye Sivan; Oliver Goldstein	Mike Wise; Allie X; Jordan Palmer^{[b]}	3:38
3.	"Need You" (featuring Valley Girl)	Hughes; Nathaniel Company; Palmer	Palmer	3:22
4.	"Casanova"	Hughes; Michael Wise; Clarence Coffee Jr.; Allan Grigg	Wise; Palmer	3:45
5.	"Lifted"	Hughes; Marius Moga; Wise; Matthew Alexander Scott	Billboard; Wise; Palmer^{[b]}^{[c]}; Allie X^{[b]}	3:14
6.	"Simon Says"	Hughes; Pimentel	Allie X; J Gramm Beats; Palmer^{[b]}	3:36
7.	"Old Habits Die Hard"	Hughes; McLaughlin; Pimentel; Christopher Rabba; Wise	Billboard; Allie X^{[b]}; Palmer^{[c]}	3:41
8.	"That's So Us"	Hughes; Mathieu Jomphe-Lepine; Jeff Lebron; McLaughlin	Billboard; Realmind; Palmer^{[c]}	3:35
9.	"Downtown"	Hughes; Henry Walter; Brandon Campbell; Joshua Coleman	Cirkut; Palmer^{[c]}	3:57
10.	"True Love Is Violent"	Hughes; McLaughlin; Christopher Braide	Braide; Palmer^{[a]}; Allie X^{[b]}	3:31

CollXtion II – 2021 vinyl reissue edition (bonus tracks)
No.	Title	Writer(s)	Producer(s)	Length
11.	"Sculpture"	Hughes; McLaughlin; Oskar Engstrom	Oskar Sikow	3:34
12.	"Purge" (Voice memo Version)	Hughes; Chris Carrabba	Allie X; Chris Carrabba	3:28

CollXtion II: Unsolved
No.	Title	Writer(s)	Length
1.	"Too Much to Dream"	Hughes	3:17
2.	"Purge"	Hughes	3:28
3.	"All the Rage"	Hughes	3:06
4.	"Casanova" (piano demo)	Hughes; Michael Wise; Coffee Jr.; Grigg	3:22
5.	"That's So Us"	Hughes; Jomphe-Lepine; Lebron; McLaughlin	3:35
6.	"Misbelieving"	Hughes	2:51
7.	"Alexandra"	Hughes	3:44

Notes

- ^{^[a]} signifies a co-producer
- ^{^[b]} signifies an additional producer
- ^{^[c]} signifies a vocal producer

== Charts ==
Chart performance for Collxtion II
Chart (2024)	Peak position
Scottish Albums (Official Charts)	73
