= CollXtion I =

EP by Allie X
- Released: April 7, 2015
- Genre: Synth-pop; indie pop; dance-pop
- Length: 27:13
- Label: Universal Music; Label X; Sleepless Records
- Producer: Alexandra Hughes; Alex Puodziukas; Brett McLaughlin; Jonas Jeberg; Kieran Adams; Graham Bertie; Marius Moga; Mathieu Jomphe Lépine; Michael Joseph Wise; Steve McKay

Allie X chronology
CollXtion I (2015)	CollXtion II (2017)

Singles from CollXtion I
- 1. "Catch" Released: February 3, 2014; 2. "Prime" Released: March 18, 2014; 3. "Bitch" Released: April 6, 2014; 4. "Never Enough" Released: November 11, 2015

CollXtion I (pronounced "Collection One") is the debut extended play by the Canadian singer-songwriter Allie X, released physically on April 7, 2015 with a short sell cycle. It is her first record released under the name Allie X. The album was initially released on April 7, 2015 in Canada. The worldwide release was pushed back twice, once to April 14, 2015 and then to April 21, 2015. Allie has stated that the album is influenced by her interest in medicine, psychology, and the macabre. During a question and answer session on social media site Tumblr, Allie stated that the overall theme for CollXtion I is "addiction and self destruction".

== Promotion ==
CollXtion I has been promoted by full-length tracks of the singles, released to YouTube and her Soundcloud, and "xamples", or snippets, of other non-single tracks released exclusively on YouTube, all of which feature her characteristic spinning GIF animations. She undertook an artist's residency at the Phi Centre in Montreal, Quebec, Canada from April 30 to May 2, 2015. The residency began with a live performance on April 30 and it included interactive media installations, a pop-up shop, and a curated online experience.

== Critical reception ==
Professional ratings
Review scores
Source	Rating
Edmonton Journal	4.5/5 stars
Pressplay	4/5
Exclaim!	8/10
Pretty Much Amazing	B−
NOW	3/5

Edmonton Journal's Julia LeConte gives a positive review of the release, calling it, "a smartly written seven-song EP that offers up a smorgasboard of indelible hooks," and goes on to say her song creating ability matches her "spectacular" voice. The editor of Pressplay says that thematically, CollXtion I, isn't much, but that the whole package is a knockout. The editor goes on to describe the content as, "songs that belong in the charts, and it's only a matter of time before the world takes note." Ryan McNutt of Exclaim! says CollXtion I finds its place in its opposites, from its simultaneous "clinical coolness," to "warm and present immediacy," and her "familiar yet foreign," vocals. Overall he says it is a "confident, catchy debut," with "earwormy flourishes along the way." Jean-Luc Marsh, hailing from Pretty Much Amazing, gave a slightly less than positive review, saying that, "X has an occasional knack for pop at its saccharine, venomous best." He says her only misstep is, "Good, which hangs inoffensively but unceremoniously." On a more positive note, he added that, "she makes up for it with an impassioned performance on closer 'Sanctuary,' packing a platitude-laden vocal wallop." Joshua Bote of The Daily Californian said of her September 2015 live performance at Rickshaw Stop of the songs from CollXtion I, "Her nearly flawless performance left a gaping hole where Allie X's identity should have been." Bote also stated, "she launched into tune after tune from CollXtion and consistently maintained the awkward rigidity of her semi-dancing, semi-flailing routine. Each number was flawlessly performed, but her set lacked an identifiable persona that set her apart from any of the Top 40 divas." Kevin Ritchie of NOW Toronto gives the EP a rating of "Good," saying that "[she] is the latest in a long line of acts... to revel in uptempo melancholia," but that "it's got solid hooks, massive melodies, multi-tracked emotions and a pile of unhealthy relationship metaphors."

Upon the release of Catch, Jamie Milton of DIY Magazine says, of Allie X and her single, "Allie X stepped on the scene like a bottle of wine at a wedding - everyone wanted a piece of her." TIME's Jasmine Cox complemented the track, saying it "shines with a level of polish and craft that's remarkable," and complemented X's "attention to detail." Logan White of Billboard magazine called Catch "an expertly crafted, remarkably vulnerable synth-pop showcase." Carl Williot from Idolator said that Catch was "everything that's wonderful about under-the-radar pop music right now: immaculate hooks, pristine synth work, vocal versatility, bold atmospherics and a beating, bursting heart," and named it "the best song of 2014." Buzzfeed's Matthew Perpetua described Prime as a "colorful, stylish synth pop song" that is "arguably even better than Catch." Melissa Locker of TIME called the song "an injection of sparkly synth-pop that's so catchy. it [sic] reminds you of why pop songs are called infectious in the first place." "Bitch" was described as, "brimming with bubbly bleeps and sonic squelches," and as highlighting "Ms. X's dream-like vocals," by Robbie Daw of Idolator. Popjustice said, "Allie X is one of the best new entities in all of Pop," going on to say that "Bitch" is a "bit noisier than 'Prime' and 'Catch' but no less amazing."

Exclaim! named the EP the 10th best EP of 2015.

== Track listing ==
Standard edition
No.	Title	Writer(s)	Producer(s)	Length
1.	"Hello"	Michael Joseph Wise; Alexandra Hughes; Marius Moga	Hughes; Wise	3:48
2.	"Catch"	Hughes; Steve McKay; Kieran Adams; Graham Bertie; Wise; Alex Puodziukas	Hughes; Wise	3:45
3.	"Prime"	Hughes; Wise	Hughes; Wise	4:13
4.	"Tumor"	Hughes; Mathieu Jomphe Lépine	Hughes; Billboard	3:08
5.	"Bitch"	Hughes; Julian Gramma	Hughes; Gramma	3:27
6.	"Good"	Hughes; Lépine	Hughes; Billboard	4:13
7.	"Sanctuary"	Hughes; Brett McLaughlin; Jonas Jeberg	Hughes; Jeberg	4:39

CollXtion I – Deluxe and vinyl edition (bonus track)
No.	Title	Writer(s)	Producer(s)	Length
8.	"Never Enough"	Hughes; Wise	Hughes; Wise	3:58

CollXtion I – 2021 vinyl reissue edition (bonus tracks)
No.	Title	Writer(s)	Producer(s)	Length
6.	"Glam!" (Demo)	Hughes; Wise	Hughes; Wise	3:42
7.	"Good"	Hughes; Lépine	Hughes; Billboard	4:13
8.	"Sanctuary"	Hughes; Brett McLaughlin; Jonas Jeberg	Hughes; Jeberg	4:39
9.	"Never Enough"	Hughes; Wise	Hughes; Wise	3:58
10.	"Tongue Tied" (Demo)	Hughes; Wise	Hughes; Wise
11.	"Too Much to Dream"	Hughes; Wise; Jungle George; Xandy Berry	Hughes; Wise; Jungle George; Xandy Berry	3:17
