= Kieran Adams =

English footballer

Personal information
- Full name: Kieran Charles Adams
- Date of birth: 20 October 1977 (age 49)
- Place of birth: St Ives, Cambridgeshire, England
- Position: Midfielder

Senior career*
| Years | Team | Apps | (Gls) |
| 1994–1999 | Barnet | 19 | (1) |
| 1996 | → Hayes (loan) | | |
| 1997 | → St Albans City (loan) | 9 | (1) |
| 1999–???? | Billericay Town | | |
- Boreham Wood
| ????–2002 | Purfleet | | |
| 2002–2004 | Windsor & Eton | 92 | (19) |
| 2004–2006 | Boreham Wood | | |
- * Club domestic league appearances and goals

Kieran Adams (born 20 October 1977) is an English footballer. On 31 December 1994, he became Barnet's youngest ever player when he played against Mansfield Town aged 17 years and 71 days, a record he held for 15 years until it was broken by Kofi Lockhart-Adams when he came on as substitute against Cheltenham Town. During his time with the Bees, he was loaned out to Hayes and St Albans City. In total, he played 19 games for Barnet, scoring one goal, against Macclesfield Town, before spells with Billericay Town, Boreham Wood, Purfleet and Windsor & Eton. He finished his career in 2006, when he was released by Boreham Wood.
