= Troye Sivan discography =

List of musical works by the Australian singer-songwriter

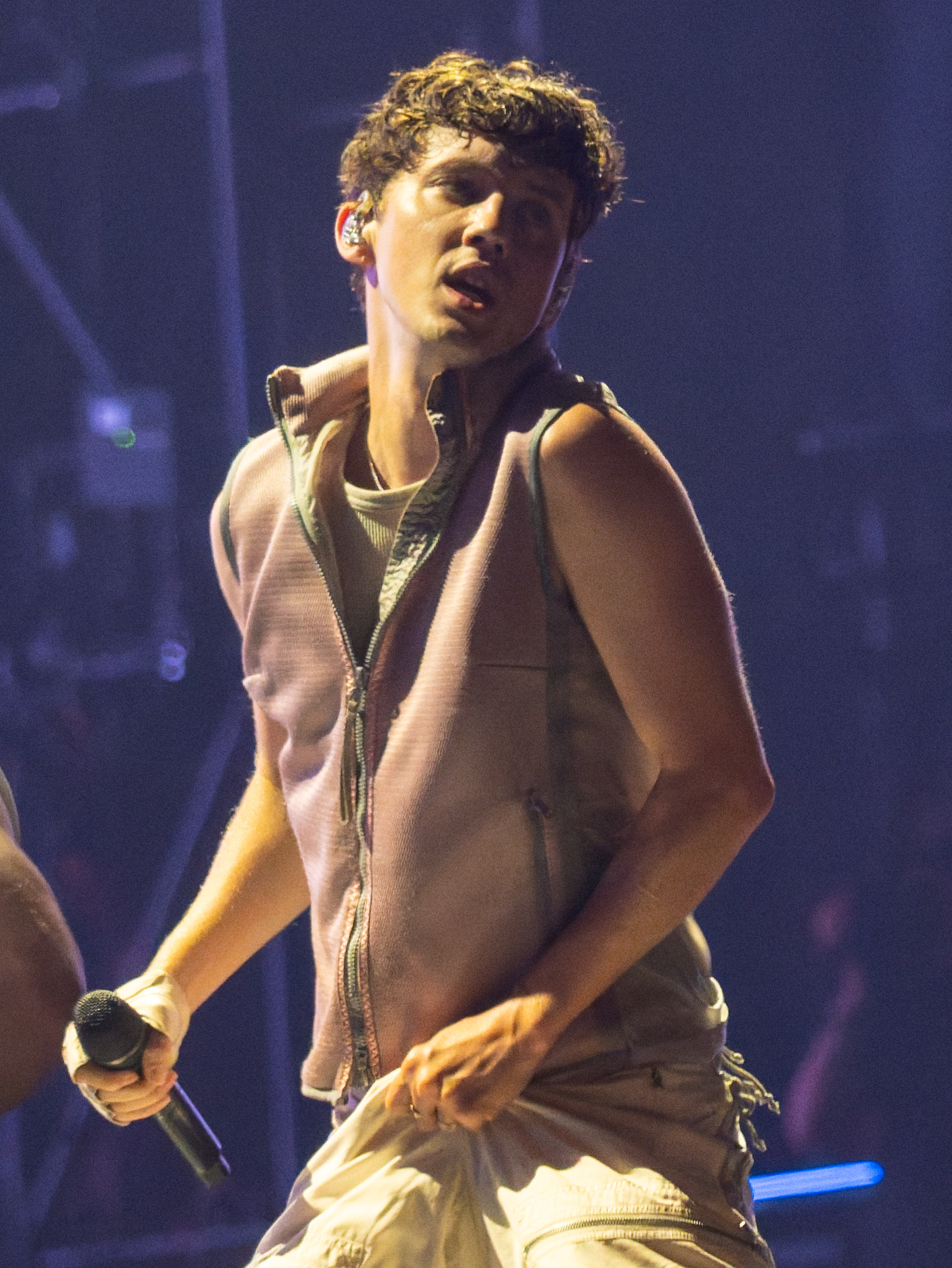
- Sivan performing at Primavera Sound 2025 in Barcelona
- Studio albums: 4
- EPs: 5
- Singles: 23
- Remix albums: 1
- Promotional singles: 10

Australian singer-songwriter Troye Sivan has released four studio albums, five extended plays, one remix album, one video album, twenty-three singles (including three as featured artist), and ten promotional singles (including one as featured artist). On 15 August 2014, Sivan released his first major-label EP, titled TRXYE, which peaked at number five on the US Billboard 200. The lead single from the EP, "Happy Little Pill", reached number 10 on the Australian singles chart. On 4 September 2015, Sivan released his second major-label EP, Wild. His debut studio album, Blue Neighbourhood, was released on 4 December 2015. Its first single, "Youth", became Sivan's first single to enter the top 40 of the Billboard Hot 100 chart, peaking at 23 and earned him his first number-one on the Billboard Dance Club Songs chart. His second studio album Bloom (2018) reached number three in Australia and number four on the Billboard 200 chart. Its lead single "My My My!" became Sivan's second number-one on the Dance Club Songs chart.

Following Bloom, Sivan contributed to the soundtracks of films Love, Simon and Boy Erased, as well as releasing internationally successful collaborations with Charli XCX (on "1999"), and Lauv (on "I'm So Tired...") before completing his third EP, In a Dream, which was released in 2020. Throughout the next two years, Sivan released several non-album singles and collaborations, including a remixed version of In a Dream's "Easy" featuring Mark Ronson and Kacey Musgraves, "You", with Regard and Tate McRae, which became his first number one on the Dance/Electronic Songs chart and third overall, "Angel Baby", and "You Know What I Need" with Pnau. In addition, he released two singles from the soundtrack to the 2022 Prime Video film Three Months in which he also played the lead role.

Sivan released his third studio album, Something to Give Each Other, on 13 October 2023. It became his first album to reach number one on the ARIA Charts in his native Australia, and reached the top ten in an additional ten countries, including number one on the US Billboard Top Dance/Electronic Albums chart. Lead single "Rush" became Sivan's highest charting solo single in Australia since his debut "Happy Little Pill" in 2010, and was a career-best in several other markets worldwide. Two further singles from the album, "Got Me Started", and "One of Your Girls" were also successful, with the latter becoming his highest-charting solo hit on the UK Singles Chart.

== Albums ==
=== Studio albums ===
List of studio albums, with selected details, chart positions, sales, and certifications
Title	Studio album details	Peak chart positions										Certifications
Title	Studio album details	AUS	CAN	DEN	GER	IRE	NLD	NZ	SWE	UK	US	Certifications
Blue Neighbourhood	Release date: 4 December 2015; Label: EMI, Capitol; Formats: Cassette, CD, LP, digital download, streaming	6	11	19	73	30	25	3	10	43	7	ARIA: Platinum; BPI: Gold; GLF: Gold; IFPI DEN: Gold; RIAA: Platinum; RMNZ: Platinum
Bloom	Release date: 31 August 2018; Label: EMI, Capitol; Formats: CD, LP, digital download, streaming	3	13	21	35	7	16	3	15	10	4	ARIA: Gold; MC: Gold; RMNZ: Gold
Something to Give Each Other	Released: 13 October 2023; Label: EMI, Capitol; Formats: Cassette, CD, LP, digital download, streaming	1	29	13	9	13	3	2	16	4	20	ARIA: Gold; BPI: Silver; MC: Gold; RMNZ: Gold
She's the Best	Released: 9 October 2026; Label: EMI, Interscope; Formats: CD, LP, digital download, streaming	2	61	—	10	44	12	8	—	9	22	

=== Remix albums ===
List of remix albums with selected details
Title	Album details
Blue Neighbourhood (The Remixes)	Released: 18 November 2016; Label: EMI, Capitol; Format: Digital download

== Extended plays ==
List of extended plays, with selected details, chart positions, and sales
Title	Extended play details	Peak chart positions										Sales	Certifications
Title	Extended play details	AUS	CAN	DEN	FRA	GER	IRE	NZ	SWE	UK	US	Sales	Certifications
Dare to Dream	Released: June 2007; Label: Self-released; Formats: Digital download	—	—	—	—	—	—	—	—	—	—		
The June Haverly EP	Released: 22 June 2012; Label: Independent; Formats: Digital download, streaming	—	—	—	—	—	—	—	—	—	—		
TRXYE	Released: 15 August 2014; Label: EMI; Formats: CD, digital download, streaming	— (Note: In Australia, TRXYE appeared on the Australian Singles Chart as sales towards "Happy Little Pill"; songs on the EP therefore could not chart separately.)	2	—	177	—	—	2	—	—	5	US: 73,000	
Wild	Released: 4 September 2015; Label: EMI, Capitol; Formats: CD, digital download, streaming	1	6	7	96	37	5	3	11	5	5	US: 60,000	RMNZ: Gold
In a Dream	Released: 21 August 2020; Label: EMI, Capitol; Formats: Cassette, CD, EP, digital download, streaming	3	—	—	—	43	76	27	—	34	70		
"—" denotes releases that did not chart or were not released in that territory.

== Singles ==
=== As lead artist ===
List of singles as lead artist, showing year released, selected chart positions, certifications, and originating album
Title	Year	Peak chart positions										Certifications	Album
Title	Year	AUS	CAN	DEN	GER	IRE	NLD	NZ	SWE	UK	US	Certifications	Album
"Happy Little Pill"	2014	10	50	11	87	11	85	2	—	86	92	ARIA: Platinum; RIAA: Gold; RMNZ: Gold	TRXYE
"Wild"	2015	16	72	—	—	62	—	29	— (Note: "Wild" did not enter the Swedish Singles Chart, but peaked at number six on the Swedish Heatseeker chart.)	62	— (Note: "Wild" did not enter the Billboard Hot 100, but peaked at number 4 on the Bubbling Under Hot 100 Singles chart.)	ARIA: 3× Platinum; BPI: Silver; MC: Platinum; RIAA: Gold; RMNZ: Platinum	Wild and Blue Neighborhood
"Youth"	2015	17	47	—	22	62	78	23	74	96	23	ARIA: 4× Platinum; BPI: Gold; BVMI: Gold; GLF: Platinum; IFPI DEN: Gold; RIAA: 2× Platinum; RMNZ: 2× Platinum	Blue Neighbourhood
"Talk Me Down"	2016	36	—	—	—	—	—	— (Note: "Talk Me Down" did not enter the NZ Top 40 Singles Chart, but peaked at number 4 on the NZ Heatseekers chart.)	—	118	—	ARIA: Gold; RIAA: Gold	Blue Neighbourhood
"Wild" (featuring Alessia Cara)	2016	26	—	—	—	—	—	—	—	—	—		Blue Neighbourhood
"Heaven" (featuring Betty Who)	2016	—	—	—	—	—	—	—	—	—	—		Blue Neighbourhood
"There for You" (with Martin Garrix)	2017	23	48	26	31	28	21	22	34	40	94	ARIA: Platinum; BPI: Gold; BVMI: Gold; GLF: Gold; IFPI DEN: Gold; MC: Platinum; RIAA: Gold; RMNZ: Platinum	Non-album single
"My My My!"	2018	14	57	—	87	32	79	25	65	38	80	ARIA: 4× Platinum; BPI: Silver; MC: Platinum; RIAA: Platinum; RMNZ: Platinum	Bloom
"The Good Side"	2018	—	—	—	—	—	—	— (Note: "The Good Side" did not enter the NZ Top 40 Singles Chart, but peaked at number four on the NZ Heatseeker Singles Chart.)	—	—	—	ARIA: Gold	Bloom
"Strawberries & Cigarettes"	2018	—	—	—	—	—	—	—	—	—	—	ARIA: Platinum; MC: Platinum; RIAA: Gold; RMNZ: Gold	Love, Simon
"Bloom"	2018	34	—	—	—	—	—	— (Note: "Bloom" did not enter the NZ Top 40 Singles Chart, but peaked at number one on the NZ Heatseeker Singles Chart.)	—	—	—	ARIA: Platinum; MC: Gold; RMNZ: Gold	Bloom
"Dance to This" (featuring Ariana Grande)	2018	39	85	—	—	52	— (Note: "Dance to This" did not enter the Single Top 100, but peaked at No. 4 on the Dutch Single Tip chart.)	— (Note: "Dance to This" did not enter the NZ Top 40 Singles Chart, but peaked at number one on the NZ Heatseeker Singles Chart.)	98	64	— (Note: "Dance to This" did not enter the Billboard Hot 100, but peaked at number 15 on the Bubbling Under Hot 100 Singles chart.)	ARIA: 2× Platinum; BPI: Silver; MC: Platinum; RIAA: Platinum; RMNZ: Gold	Bloom
"Animal"	2018	—	—	—	—	—	—	— (Note: "Animal" did not enter the NZ Top 40 Singles Chart, but peaked at number 16 on the NZ Hot Singles Chart.)	—	—	—		Bloom
"1999" (with Charli XCX)	2018	18	—	—	—	28	— (Note: "1999" did not enter the Single Top 100, but peaked at number 14 on the Dutch Single Tip chart.)	— (Note: "1999" did not enter the NZ Top 40 Singles Chart, but peaked at number 10 on the NZ Hot Singles Chart.)	— (Note: "1999" did not enter the Swedish Singellista Chart, but peaked at number 15 on the Swedish Heatseeker Chart.)	13	—	ARIA: 2× Platinum; BPI: Platinum; IFPI DEN: Gold; RMNZ: Platinum	Charli
"Revelation" (with Jónsi)	2018	—	—	—	—	—	—	—	—	—	—		Boy Erased
"Somebody to Love"	2018	—	—	—	—	—	—	—	—	—	—	BPI: Silver	Non-album single
"I'm So Tired..." (with Lauv)	2019	11	57	40	42	4	67	9	37	8	81	ARIA: 3× Platinum; BPI: Platinum; BVMI: Gold; IFPI DEN: Gold; MC: Platinum; RIAA: Platinum; RMNZ: 2× Platinum	How I'm Feeling
"Take Yourself Home"	2020	91	—	—	—	—	—	— (Note: "Take Yourself Home" did not enter the NZ Top 40 Singles Chart, but peaked at number nine on the NZ Hot Singles Chart.)	—	—	—		In a Dream
"Easy" (solo or remix with Kacey Musgraves featuring Mark Ronson)	2020	—	—	—	—	—	—	— (Note: "Easy" did not enter the NZ Top 40 Singles Chart, but peaked at number 11 on the NZ Hot Singles Chart.)	—	—	—	ARIA: Platinum; RIAA: Gold; RMNZ: Gold	In a Dream
"Rager Teenager!"	2020	—	—	—	—	—	—	— (Note: "Rager Teenager!" did not enter the NZ Top 40 Singles Chart, but peaked at number 31 on the NZ Hot Singles Chart.)	—	—	—		In a Dream
"You" (with Regard and Tate McRae)	2021	51	38	—	—	50	30	— (Note: "You" did not enter the NZ Top 40 Singles Chart, but peaked at number three on the NZ Hot Singles Chart.)	68	46	58	BPI: Silver; IFPI DEN: Gold; MC: x2 Platinum; RIAA: Gold; RMNZ: Gold	Non-album singles
"Could Cry Just Thinkin About You"	2021	—	—	—	—	—	—	— (Note: "Could Cry Just Thinkin About You" did not enter the NZ Top 40 Singles Chart, but peaked at number 19 on the NZ Hot Singles Chart.)	—	—	—		Non-album singles
"Angel Baby"	2021	—	—	—	—	—	—	— (Note: "Angel Baby" did not enter the NZ Top 40 Singles Chart, but peaked at number 19 on the NZ Hot Singles Chart.)	—	—	—	ARIA: Platinum; RMNZ: Gold	Non-album singles
"Trouble" (with Jay Som)	2022	—	—	—	—	—	—	— (Note: "Trouble" did not enter the NZ Top 40 Singles Chart, but peaked at number 33 on the NZ Hot Singles Chart.)	—	—	—		Three Months
"Wait" (with Gordi)	2022	—	—	—	—	—	—	—	—	—	—		Three Months
"You Know What I Need" (with Pnau)	2022	—	—	—	—	—	—	— (Note: "You Know What I Need" did not enter the NZ Top 40 Singles Chart, but peaked at number 22 on the NZ Hot Singles Chart.)	—	—	—		Hyperbolic
"Rush"	2023	12	40	—	85	8	35	22	61	21	77	ARIA: 3× Platinum; BPI: Platinum; MC: 2× Platinum; RMNZ: Platinum	Something to Give Each Other
"Got Me Started"	2023	21	—	—	—	28	— (Note: "Got Me Started" did not enter the Single Top 100, but peaked at number 18 on the Single Tip chart.)	— (Note: "Got Me Started" did not enter the NZ Top 40 Singles Chart, but peaked at number three on the NZ Hot Singles Chart.)	— (Note: "Got Me Started" did not enter the Swedish Singellista Chart, but peaked at number two on the Swedish Heatseeker Chart.)	34	—	ARIA: 2× Platinum; BPI: Silver; RMNZ: Gold	Something to Give Each Other
"One of Your Girls"	2023	24	42	38	—	9	45	17	26	11	79	ARIA: Platinum; BPI: Silver; MC: Platinum; RMNZ: Gold	Something to Give Each Other
"Honey"	2024	—	—	—	—	—	—	—	—	—	— (Note: "Honey" did not enter the US Billboard Hot 100, but peaked at number 29 on the US Billboard Hot Dance/Electronic Songs Chart.)		Something to Give Each Other
"She's the Best"	2026	— (Note: "She's the Best" did not enter the Australian Singles Chart Top 100, but peaked at number 6 on the Australian Artist Singles Chart.)	—	—	—	—	—	— (Note: "She's the Best" did not enter the NZ Top 40 Singles Chart, but peaked at number 12 on the NZ Hot Singles Chart.)	—	—	—		She's the Best
"Party"	2026	94	—	—	—	—	—	— (Note: "Party" did not enter the NZ Top 40 Singles Chart, but peaked at number 6 on the NZ Hot Singles Chart.)	—	— (Note: "Party" did not enter the UK Singles Chart Top 100, but peaked at number 63 on the UK Singles Sales Chart.)	—		She's the Best
"FF"	2026	— (Note: "FF" did not enter the Australian Singles Chart Top 100, but peaked at number 8 on the Australian Artist Singles Chart.)	—	—	—	—	—	—	—	—	—		She's the Best
"—" denotes releases that did not chart or were not released in that territory.

=== As featured artist ===
List of singles as a featured artist, showing year released, selected chart positions, certifications, and originating album
Title	Year	Peak chart positions						Certifications	Album
Title	Year	AUS	CAN	NZ Hot	UK	US	US Electr.	Certifications	Album
"Papercut" (Zedd featuring Troye Sivan)	2015	93	—	—	—	—	31		True Colors
"Hands" (with various artists)	2016	—	—	—	—	—	—		Non-album single
"Love Me Wrong" (Allie X featuring Troye Sivan)	2019	—	—	—	—	—	—		Cape God
"Talk Talk" (Charli XCX featuring Troye Sivan)	2024	—	66	5	24	74	—	BPI: Silver	Brat and It's Completely Different but Also Still Brat
"—" denotes releases that did not chart or were not released in that territory.

=== Promotional singles ===
List of promotional singles
Song	Year	Album
"Crazy Love"	2011	Non-album singles
"The One That Got Away"	2011	Non-album singles
"Love Is a Losing Game"	2011	Non-album singles
"Pumped Up Kicks"	2011	Non-album singles
"Someone Like You"	2012	Non-album singles
"Sea of Love"	2012	Non-album singles
"The 2012 Song"	2012	Non-album singles
"We're My OTP"	2012	Non-album singles
"The Fault In Our Stars	2013	TRXYE
"2099" (Charli XCX featuring Troye Sivan)	2019	Charli
"Physical" (Dua Lipa featuring Troye Sivan)	2025	Non-album single

== Other charted and certified songs ==
List of other charted songs, showing year released, selected chart positions, certifications, and originating album
Title	Year	Peak chart positions					Certifications	Album
Title	Year	AUS	IRE	NZ Hot	US Country	US Electr.	Certifications	Album
"Fools"	2015	85	—	—	—	—	ARIA: Platinum; RIAA: Gold; RMNZ: Gold	Wild
"Bite"	2015	—	—	—	—	—	ARIA: Gold	Wild
"Seventeen"	2018	—	—	14	—	—		Bloom
"Postcard" (featuring Gordi)	2018	—	—	22	—	—		Bloom
"Plum"	2018	—	92	11	—	—		Bloom
"Lucky Strike"	2018	—	—	—	—	—	ARIA: Gold	Bloom
"Glittery" (with Kacey Musgraves)	2019	—	—	—	33	—		The Kacey Musgraves Christmas Show
"Could Cry Just Thinkin About You" (interlude version)	2020	—	—	36	—	—		In a Dream
"Stud"	2020	—	—	35	—	—		In a Dream
"In a Dream"	2020	—	—	10	—	—		In a Dream
"What's the Time Where You Are?"	2023	—	—	7	—	18		Something to Give Each Other
"In My Room" (featuring Guitarricadelafuente)	2023	—	—	9	—	—		Something to Give Each Other
"Still Got It"	2023	—	—	13	—	—		Something to Give Each Other
"Silly"	2023	—	—	—	—	28		Something to Give Each Other
"Canada Dry"	2026	—	—	12	—	—		She's the Best
"Embarassingly"	2026	—	—	19	—	—		She's the Best
"FF"	2026	—	—	7	—	—		She's the Best
"—" denotes items which were not released in that country or failed to chart.

== Guest appearances ==
List of other appearances
Title	Year	Album
"Just One of the Boys"	2010	Spud
"Just One Minute"	2010	Spud
"Dear Lord & Father of Mankind"	2010	Spud
"Giving It All"	2010	Spud
"My Sweet Lord"	2023	The Idol Episode 5 Part 2 (Music from the HBO Original Series)
"Supernatural" (with Ariana Grande)	2024	Eternal Sunshine (Slightly Deluxe)

== Songwriting credits ==
List of songs written by Sivan for other artists
Title	Year	Artist(s)	Album
"Careless Game"	2016	Alfie Arcuri	Zenith
"Vintage"	2017	Allie X	CollXtion II
"The Other Side"	2018	Betty Who	Sierra Burgess Is a Loser (Original Motion Picture Soundtrack)
"Kid Wonder"	2018	Allie X	Sierra Burgess Is a Loser (Original Motion Picture Soundtrack)
"Sunflower"	2018	Shannon Purser	Sierra Burgess Is a Loser (Original Motion Picture Soundtrack)
"Another Lover"	2019	Leland	Non-album single
"Louder than Bombs"	2020	BTS	Map of the Soul: 7
"Naked Eye"	2024	Keelan Mak	Boy's in Love
"Heat"	2025	Rita Ora	Non-album single
