= Troye Sivan Live =

2015–16 concert tour by Troye Sivan

- Tour by Troye Sivan
- Promotional poster for tour
- Associated albums: Wild Blue Neighbourhood
- Start date: 13 October 2015
- End date: 13 January 2016
- Legs: 2
- No. of shows: 10 in North America; 4 in Europe; 2 in Australia; 16 Total
- Producer: Sergey Rozenberg

Troye Sivan concert chronology
- Troye Sivan Live (2015); Blue Neighbourhood Tour (2016)

Troye Sivan Live was the debut concert tour by Australian singer Troye Sivan. The tour supported his fourth EP, Wild, and debut studio album, Blue Neighbourhood. The tour started in October 2015 in North America and continued in Europe in November 2015 and Australia in January 2016.

== Background ==
Following the release of the EP, Sivan tweeted that he planned to do live shows in October 2015. The following day, during an interview with SugarScape, the singer stated that he planned to visit the UK and Australia before the end of the year. Within the coming weeks, Sivan posted pictures to his Instagram account of rehearsals. The tour was officially announced on 25 September 2015, via Sivan's official Twitter account. The announcement came alongside the release of the video for "Fools". The news of the tour and video helped the singer claim the top spot on Billboard's "Twitter Trending 140" chart. Hours later, it was revealed that the tour sold out within 30 minutes.

Commenting on his first live performances, Sivan stated:

I haven't performed since I was 16 or something like that. It's such a different ball game now though—these are my songs and my vision come to life. I am really excited about it. I think it's going to be a connection unlike any I have experienced before. I am definitely going to cry. If people sing back lyrics to me, I am done.

Sivan's debut album Blue Neighbourhood came out four days after the conclusion of the tour, which means the songs "Suburbia", "Cool", and "Youth" were still unreleased at the time Sivan was performing them on tour. While Sivan was in Paris on 23 November for one of his last shows, he announced the Blue Neighbourhood Tour that will set off in 2016.

== Opening acts ==
- DJ100Proof (Seattle)
- Mountain of Youth (San Francisco)
- LANY (Los Angeles)
- DJ ABD (Cambridge)
- DJ Lani Love (Chicago)
- DJ Shea Van Horn (Washington, D.C.)
- DJ Sparber (New York City)
- Tkay Maidza (Berlin, Paris and London)
- DJ Tyde Levi (Perth)
- Gordi (Sydney)

== Setlist ==
1. "Bite"
2. "Fools"
3. "Cool"
4. "DKLA"
5. "Ease"
6. "Talk Me Down"
7. "Suburbia"
8. "Wild"
9. "Happy Little Pill"
10. "Youth"

== Tour dates ==
Date	City	Country	Venue	Opening acts	Attendance	Revenue
North America
13 October 2015	Los Angeles	United States	The Mint	—	—	—
15 October 2015	Seattle	United States	Neumos	DJ100Proof	—	—
18 October 2015	San Francisco	United States	Great American Music Hall	Mountain of Youth	—	—
22 October 2015	West Hollywood	United States	Roxy Theatre	—	—	—
23 October 2015^{[A]}	Los Angeles	United States	Lyric Theatre	LANY	300 / 300	$4,500
26 October 2015	Cambridge	United States	The Sinclair	DJ ABD	—	—
28 October 2015	Minneapolis	United States	Varsity Theater	—	—	—
30 October 2015	Chicago	United States	Lincoln Hall	DJ Lani Love	—	—
1 November 2015	Washington, D.C.	United States	U Street Music Hall	DJ Shea Van Horn	—	—
4 November 2015	New York City	United States	(Le) Poisson Rouge	DJ Sparber	—	—
Europe
19 November 2015	London	England	O_{2} Academy Islington	Tkay Maidza	—	—
23 November 2015	Paris	France	Théâtre des Etoiles	Tkay Maidza	—	—
26 November 2015	Berlin	Germany	Gretchen	Tkay Maidza	—	—
30 November 2015	Stockholm	Sweden	Debaser Strand	—	—	—
Australia
11 January 2016	Perth	Australia	Astor Theatre	DJ Tyde Levi	901 / 901	$15,540
13 January 2016	Sydney	Australia	Enmore Theatre	Gordi	2,274 / 2,274	$45,080
Total					3,475 / 3,475	$65,120

Festivals and other miscellaneous performances
^{A} This concert was co-headlined with LANY

== Cancelled shows ==
List of cancelled concerts, showing date, city, country, venue, and reason for cancellation
Date	City	Country	Venue	Reason/Additional Info
12 November 2015	Sydney	Australia	Metro Theatre	Cancelled due to illness; moved to Enmore Theatre and rescheduled to 13 January
15 November 2015	Perth	Australia	Astor Theatre	Cancelled due to illness; rescheduled to 11 January
24 November 2015	Paris	France	La Flèche d'or	Moved to Théâtre des Etoiles and rescheduled to 23 November 2015
