= Blue Neighbourhood Tour =

2016 concert tour by Troye Sivan

- Tour by Troye Sivan
- Promotional poster for tour
- Associated album: Blue Neighbourhood
- Start date: 3 February 2016
- End date: 24 September 2016
- Legs: 5
- No. of shows: 35 in North America; 22 in Europe; 2 in Asia; 10 in Oceania; 69 total

Troye Sivan concert chronology
- Troye Sivan Live (2015); Blue Neighbourhood Tour (2016); Suburbia Tour (2016)

The Blue Neighbourhood Tour was the second concert tour by Australian singer Troye Sivan, in support of his debut studio album Blue Neighbourhood (2015).

== Background ==
On 23 November 2015, two weeks before the release of Sivan's debut album, Blue Neighbourhood (2015), the tour was announced by Sivan while he was in Paris on his debut tour Troye Sivan Live. Shows in North America were announced, while tour dates in Europe were added two weeks later. In December 2015, it was announced that Allie X, LANY and Shamir would serve as supporting opening acts for select dates on the North American leg of the tour.

== Set list ==
This set list is representative of the show on 3 February 2016, in Vancouver. It does not represent all dates throughout the tour.

1. "Bite"
2. "for him."
3. "Fools"
4. "Heaven"
5. "Suburbia"
6. "Cool"
7. "Too Good"
8. "Wild"
9. "Love Yourself"
10. "Happy Little Pill"
11. "Ease"
12. "DKLA"
13. "Talk Me Down"
14. "Lost Boy"
15. "Youth"

== Tour dates ==
List of concerts, showing date, city, country, venue, opening acts, tickets sold, number of available tickets and amount of gross revenue
Date	City	Country	Venue	Opening acts	Attendance	Revenue
North America
3 February 2016	Vancouver	Canada	Vogue Theatre	Allie X	—N/a	—N/a
4 February 2016	Seattle	United States	Showbox SoDo	Allie X	—N/a	—N/a
6 February 2016	Portland	United States	Roseland Theater	Allie X	—N/a	—N/a
8 February 2016	Oakland	United States	Fox Oakland Theatre	Allie X	2,800 / 2,800	$73,500
11 February 2016	Los Angeles	United States	Belasco Theatre	Allie X	2,593 / 2,925	$58,343
12 February 2016	Los Angeles	United States	Belasco Theatre	Allie X	2,593 / 2,925	$58,343
16 February 2016	Denver	United States	Ogden Theatre	LANY	—N/a	—N/a
19 February 2016	Minneapolis	United States	First Avenue	LANY	—N/a	—N/a
20 February 2016	Milwaukee	United States	Rave Nightclub	LANY	—N/a	—N/a
22 February 2016	Chicago	United States	House of Blues	LANY	—N/a	—N/a
23 February 2016	Chicago	United States	House of Blues	LANY	—N/a	—N/a
24 February 2016	Royal Oak	United States	Royal Oak Music Theatre	LANY	2,000 / 2,000	$50,469
29 February 2016	Boston	United States	House of Blues	LANY	2,426 / 2,509	$63,676
1 March 2016	New York City	United States	Webster Hall	LANY	—N/a	—N/a
2 March 2016	New York City	United States	Webster Hall	LANY	—N/a	—N/a
4 March 2016	Philadelphia	United States	The Fillmore Philadelphia	LANY	—N/a	—N/a
7 March 2016	Washington, D.C.	United States	9:30 Club	Shamir	2,400 / 2,400	$63,000
8 March 2016	Washington, D.C.	United States	9:30 Club	Shamir	2,400 / 2,400	$63,000
10 March 2016	Atlanta	United States	Variety Playhouse	Shamir	—N/a	—N/a
12 March 2016	Lake Buena Vista	United States	House of Blues	Shamir	—N/a	—N/a
13 March 2016	Miami Beach	United States	The Fillmore Miami Beach	Shamir	—N/a	—N/a
16 March 2016	Dallas	United States	House of Blues	Shamir	—N/a	—N/a
17 March 2016	Houston	United States	House of Blues	Shamir	—N/a	—N/a
Europe
15 April 2016	Dublin	Ireland	Olympia Theatre	Astrid S	—N/a	—N/a
16 April 2016	Glasgow	Scotland	Qudos	Astrid S	—N/a	—N/a
18 April 2016	Manchester	England	Manchester Academy 2	Astrid S	—N/a	—N/a
19 April 2016	London	England	O_{2} Shepherd's Bush Empire	Astrid S	—N/a	—N/a
21 April 2016	London	England	O_{2} Shepherd's Bush Empire	Astrid S	—N/a	—N/a
23 April 2016	Birmingham	England	O_{2} Institute 2	Astrid S	—N/a	—N/a
25 April 2016	Antwerp	Belgium	Trix	Astrid S	—N/a	—N/a
26 April 2016	Paris	France	La Cigale	Astrid S	—N/a	—N/a
29 April 2016	Madrid	Spain	Teatro Barcelo	Astrid S	—N/a	—N/a
2 May 2016	Milan	Italy	Discoteca Alcatraz	Astrid S	—N/a	—N/a
3 May 2016	Zürich	Switzerland	Plaza	Astrid S	—N/a	—N/a
5 May 2016	Munich	Germany	Backstage Werk	Astrid S	1,200 / 1,200	$27,579
7 May 2016	Vienna	Austria	Ottakringer Brauerei	Astrid S	—N/a	—N/a
9 May 2016	Cologne	Germany	Live Music Hall	Astrid S	1,501 / 1,501	$34,231
10 May 2016	Amsterdam	Netherlands	Paradiso	Astrid S	—N/a	—N/a
13 May 2016	Hamburg	Germany	Docks	Astrid S	1,500 / 1,500	$34,217
15 May 2016	Berlin	Germany	Huxleys Neue Welt	Astrid S	1,600 / 1,600	$36,170
17 May 2016	Copenhagen	Denmark	Vega Musikkens Hus	Astrid S	—N/a	—N/a
North America
10 June 2016^{[A]}	West Windsor Township	United States	Mercer County Park Festival Grounds	—N/a	—N/a	—N/a
11 June 2016^{[B]}	Wantagh	United States	Nikon at Jones Beach Theater	—N/a	—N/a	—N/a
12 June 2016^{[C]}	Scranton	United States	The Pavilion	—N/a	—N/a	—N/a
15 June 2016^{[D]}	Hershey	United States	Giant Center	—N/a	—N/a	—N/a
17 June 2016^{[E]}	Rochester	United States	Frontier Field	—N/a	—N/a	—N/a
18 June 2016^{[F]}	Mansfield	United States	Xfinity Center	—N/a	—N/a	—N/a
19 June 2016^{[G]}	Buffalo	United States	Canalside	—N/a	—N/a	—N/a
21 June 2016^{[H]}	Scottsdale	United States	Livewire	—N/a	—N/a	—N/a
23 June 2016^{[I]}	Fort Wayne	United States	USF Performing Arts Center	—N/a	—N/a	—N/a
24 June 2016^{[J]}	Indianapolis	United States	Indiana Farmers Coliseum	—N/a	—N/a	—N/a
25 June 2016^{[K]}	Sterling Heights	United States	Freedom Hill Amphitheatre	—N/a	—N/a	—N/a
Asia
23 July 2016^{[L]}	Icheon	South Korea	Jisan Valley Ski Resort	—N/a	—N/a	—N/a
24 July 2016^{[M]}	Yuzawa	Japan	Naeba Ski Resort	—N/a	—N/a	—N/a
Oceania
28 July 2016	Christchurch	New Zealand	Horncastle Arena	Tigertown	—N/a	—N/a
30 July 2016	Auckland	New Zealand	Auckland Town Hall	Tigertown	—N/a	—N/a
31 July 2016	Auckland	New Zealand	Auckland Town Hall	Tigertown	—N/a	—N/a
3 August 2016	Sydney	Australia	Hordern Pavilion	Nicole Millar; Tyde Levi	5,382 / 5,382	$182,175
4 August 2016	Canberra	Australia	UC Refectory	Nicole Millar; Tyde Levi	—	—
6 August 2016	Brisbane	Australia	Riverstage	Nicole Millar; Tyde Levi	—	—
7 August 2016	Wollongong	Australia	Great Hall	Nicole Millar; Tyde Levi	—	—
9 August 2016	Melbourne	Australia	Margaret Court Arena	Nicole Millar; Tyde Levi	—	—
11 August 2016	Adelaide	Australia	Adelaide Entertainment Centre	Nicole Millar; Tyde Levi	—	—
13 August 2016	Perth	Australia	HBF Stadium	Nicole Millar; Tyde Levi	—	—
Europe
20 August 2016^{[N]}	Chelmsford	England	Hylands Park	—N/a	—N/a	—N/a
21 August 2016^{[N]}	Staffordshire	England	Weston Park	—N/a	—N/a	—N/a
7 September 2016	Oslo	Norway	Sentrum Scene	Astrid S	—N/a	—N/a
9 September 2016	Stockholm	Sweden	Gröna Lund	Astrid S	—N/a	—N/a
North America
24 September 2016^{[O]}	Las Vegas	United States	MGM Resorts Village	—N/a	—N/a	—N/a
Total					—	—

Festivals and other miscellaneous performances
^{A} Summer Bash
^{B} BLI Summer Jam
^{C} KRZ Summer Smash
^{D} Trendfest
^{E} 98 PXY Summer Jam
^{F} Kiss Concert
^{G} Kiss the Summer Hello
^{H} SSIK Show
^{I} HOT 107.9 Summer Jam
^{J} 99.5 WZPL Birthday Bash
^{K} AMP Live
^{L} Jisan Valley Rock Festival
^{M} Fuji Rock Festival
^{N} V Festival
^{O} iHeartRadio Music Festival

Cancellations and rescheduled shows

26 February 2016	Toronto, Canada	Danforth Music Hall	Cancelled
27 February 2016	Montreal, Canada	Corona Theatre	Cancelled
