= FF (song) =

Single by Troye Sivan

from the album She's the Best
- Released: 9 October 2026
- Genre: Dream pop
- Length: 4:22
- Label: Interscope
- Songwriters: Jack Antonoff; George Daniel; Jasper Harris; Madison Love; Troye Sivan; Henry Walter
- Producers: Jack Antonoff; Cirkut; George Daniel; Jasper Harris

Troye Sivan singles chronology
"Party" (2026)	"FF" (2026)

Music video
- "FF" on YouTube

"FF" is a song by Australian singer Troye Sivan. It was released on 9 October 2026 through Interscope as the third single from his fourth studio album She's the Best. The song was written by Sivan, Madison Love, Jack Antonoff, George Daniel, Jasper Harris, and Cirkut, and produced by the latter four. Standing for "Fucking Forever", lyrically the song is an ode to a prospective future lover and the desire to finding a long-lasting relationship. It was released alongside a music video filmed on Fire Island.

== Background ==
Sivan began teasing new music on 6 August 2026 in a series of cryptic social media posts, a headshot photo of him wearing theatrical makeup, updates to his official website, a video of posters with the initials "STB", and a series of pictures of Sivan and Addison Rae in elaborate wigs with a caption of the same initials, leading to speculation that a new album was on the way.

The album, She's the Best, was officially announced on 13 August alongside a teaser for the title track that lasted 14 seconds, with the end of the teaser revealing the song's release date. Additionally, the song was premiered live a day before release in promotion with TikTok. The title track was released the following day on 14 August 2026, followed by second single "Party" on 17 September. Sivan revealed the full tracklist on 1 October, with "FF" featuring as the tenth song.

"FF" was officially released as the third single on 9 October 2026, the same day as the album was released.

== Lyrics and composition ==
Shorthand for "Fucking Forever", "FF" is a song about holding onto the excitement and uncertainty of wanting a relationship to last. It captures Sivan's longing for a lasting love, one that moves beyond fantasy and into reality, and reflects the hope that a fleeting encounter might eventually become something permanent, tangible, and uses the imagery of a structure built from concrete and steel to signify his hope for something stable and enduring. Of the song, Sivan stated that, “‘FF’ is an undying love song to a man I don't know yet. Or at least I don't think I do. It's me at my most longing, and about how lonely it is to love someone who isn't here yet. It might sound like a vow, but it's really a wish.”

Sonically, the track is an dream pop song that features shoegaze-style guitars and synths, sparse swirling psychedelic beats, and yearning vocals. Discussing the contrast between the song's sound and lyrics, Sivan explained, “‘FF’ is definitely one of those where I’m like, it’s this imagination essentially. A positive spin on it is maybe it’s a manifestation. I loved the idea of writing this love song, but then just absolutely swamping it in this grit and weight and heaviness. And so that’s where that one came from.”

== Music video ==
The song's official music video was released on 9 October 2026 simultaneously with the album. Directed by Gordon von Steiner, who also directed the videos for "She's the Best" and "Party", Sivan described it as the “gayest music video of [his] career.” It was filmed on Fire Island and chronicles a romance between Sivan and his love interest, played by Swiss actor Felix Mayr. Sivan and von Steiner aimed to translate the yearning depicted in the lyrics into the video, with Sivan expressing that, “I wanted it to have this heaviness to it and this weight that kind of feels like longing. It's a love song that feels like it drags you through the mud with it, and I just really really love it.” Of the experience making the video, Sivan explained, “we went to Fire Island, which in itself was such a special experience. It was my first time going, and it reminded me a bit of Australia. It’s shockingly beautiful and there’s so much history there. I wanted to tell a love story, and it felt like such a beautiful place to do that. Also, after the mammoth video that we made for “Party,” I think Gordon and I wanted to make something that represented “FF” and the more interior side of the album. We wanted to make something simple and filmic and hopefully very beautiful.”

In the video, Sivan can be seen taking PrEP, a medication used to prevent the contraction of HIV. Sivan's longtime collaborator Leland, whom he worked with extensively on She's the Best, praised this and stated, “when Troye showed me the video for 'FF,' I told him, 'I don't think you know how important this video is.' The first time I saw two guys kissing was the Christina Aguilera 'Beautiful' video. It's still burned in my brain as part of my upbringing. That was the first moment where gay love started to feel normalized and I wasn't crazy! This would have made such an impact on little Leland.”

== Charts ==
Chart performance
Chart (2026)	Peak position
Australian Artist Singles (ARIA)	8
Israel International TV Airplay (Media Forest)	1
