= Bram Inscore =

American musician (1982–2023)

- Born: Bram Katz Inscore; January 11, 1982; San Francisco, California, U.S.
- Died: December 19, 2023 (aged 41); San Francisco, California, U.S.
- Resting place: Hollywood Forever Cemetery
- Education: University of Southern California
- Occupations: Songwriter; record producer
- Spouse: Lin Agnholt (m. 2013)

Bram Katz Inscore (January 11, 1982 – December 19, 2023) was an American musician, songwriter, and producer. Born and raised in California, he wrote and produced many pop songs, including for Troye Sivan, as well as K-pop songs popular in South Korea.

== Early life ==
Bram Katz Inscore was born on January 11, 1982, in San Francisco, California. He attended the University of Southern California and studied jazz and classical music.

== Career ==
Inscore began his career as a touring musician with Jem, Beck, Charlotte Gainsbourg, Thurston Moore, and Twin Shadow. As a session musician, he played the electric bass on Beck's 2014 album Morning Phase, on Gainsbourg's IRM, and on a number of other projects.

Inscore co-wrote and co-produced several songs on Troye Sivan's 2015 Blue Neighborhood album, including "Talk Me Down" and "Youth", and on his 2018 album Bloom, including "The Good Side" and "Animal". According to The New Indian Express, "his work with Troye Sivan continues to stand out."

Besides Sivan, Inscore co-wrote songs for Allie X, Ben Platt, Chloe & Halle, Claud, Duncan Laurence, Hayley Kiyoko, Mayer Hawthorne, Niki, Rina Sawayama, and the Veronicas. He was also active in K-pop circles in South Korea, writing "Louder Than Bombs" for BTS with Sivan and X, as well as other songs for NCT 127, SuperM, Baekhyun, and Taemin.

Inscore co-wrote the music score of the 2018 film Sierra Burgess Is a Loser. A year later, he was a co-writer of Andy Grammer's "Don't Give Up on Me", the theme song of the 2019 film Five Feet Apart.

== Personal life and death ==
Inscore was married to Lin Agnholt. He died by suicide on December 19, 2023, in his hometown of San Francisco, at the age of 41.

== Discography ==
Year	Title	Artist(s)	Album	Credits
2015	"Talk Me Down"	Troye Sivan	Blue Neighbourhood	Producer, writer
2015	"Youth"	Troye Sivan	Blue Neighbourhood	Producer, writer
2015	"Lost Boy"	Troye Sivan	Blue Neighbourhood	Producer, writer
2015	"For Him"	Troye Sivan	Blue Neighbourhood	Producer, writer
2015	"Suburbia"	Troye Sivan	Blue Neighbourhood	Producer, writer
2015	"Swimming Pools"	Troye Sivan	Blue Neighbourhood	Producer, writer
2015	"Bite"	Troye Sivan	Blue Neighbourhood	Producer, writer
2016	"One Bad Night"	Hayley Kiyoko	Citrine	Producer, writer
2018	"Down"	Chloe x Halle	The Kids Are Alright	Writer
2018	"Seventeen"	Troye Sivan	Bloom	Producer, writer
2018	"The Good Side"	Troye Sivan	Bloom	Producer, writer
2018	"Postcard" (featuring Gordi)	Troye Sivan	Bloom	Producer, writer
2018	"What a Heavenly Way to Die"	Troye Sivan	Bloom	Producer, writer
2018	"Animal"	Troye Sivan	Bloom	Producer, writer
2018	"This This"	Troye Sivan	Bloom	Producer, writer
2018	"Warpaint"	88rising & Niki	Head in the Clouds	Producer, writer
2020	"Louder Than Bombs"	BTS	Map of the Soul: 7	Producer, writer
2020	"Comme des Garçons (Like the Boys)"	Rina Sawayama	Sawayama	Producer, writer
2020	"Love Me 4 Me"	Rina Sawayama	Sawayama	Writer
2020	"Bees & Honey"	Rina Sawayama	Sawayama	Producer, writer
2020	"Ghost"	Baekhyun	Delight	Producer, writer
2020	"Wish You Were Here"	SuperM	Super One	Producer
2020	"Pansy"	Taemin	Never Gonna Dance Again	Producer, writer
2021	"King of the World, Pt. 1"	Ben Platt	Reverie	Producer
2021	"King of the World, Pt. 2"	Ben Platt	Reverie	Producer
2021	"King of the World, Pt. 3"	Ben Platt	Reverie	Producer
2022	"Bound"	Key	Gasoline	Producer
2023	"My Sweet Lord"	Troye Sivan	The Idol (Music from the HBO Original Series)	Producer
2023	"Space"	NCT 127	Walk	Producer, writer
