= Wild (Troye Sivan EP) =

EP by Troye Sivan
- Released: 4 September 2015
- Genres: Electropop; dream pop
- Length: 22:10
- Labels: EMI Australia; Capitol
- Producers: Alex Hope; SLUMS; Alex JL Hiew; Bram Inscore; Pip Norman; Caleb Nott; Dann Hume

Troye Sivan chronology
TRXYE (2014)	Wild (2015)	Blue Neighbourhood (2015)

Singles from Wild
- 1. "Wild" Released: 3 September 2015

Wild is the fourth extended play (EP) by Australian singer Troye Sivan, released on 4 September 2015 by EMI Music Australia. It is Sivan's second extended play released through a major record label after TRXYE.

Sivan embarked on his first US tour titled Troye Sivan Live in support of the EP, later extended to a world tour after announcing Wild was an introduction to his debut studio album Blue Neighbourhood.

== Background ==
On 25 July 2015, Sivan announced his fourth extended play at VidCon and described it as an "opening installment, a 6-song keyhole to introduce you guys to all of the music I've got coming in 2015." On 13 October 2015, it was revealed to be an introduction to his debut studio album Blue Neighbourhood.

Three songs from Wild were selected to be on the standard edition of the album, while all six songs were transferred to the deluxe edition. Those who had already purchased Wild received a discount to purchase Blue Neighbourhood.

== Commercial performance ==
Professional ratings
Review scores
Source	Rating
Renowned for Sound	4.5/5 stars

Wild debuted at number five in the United States, selling 50,000 units (45,000 total album sales). It has sold 60,000 albums in the US by late October 2015. In Sivan's native Australia, Wild debuted at number one, and became the first extended play to do so.

== Track listing ==
CD and digital download
No.	Title	Writer(s)	Producer(s)	Length
1.	"Wild"	Troye Sivan; Alex Hope	Alex Hope	3:48
2.	"Bite"	Sivan; Bram Inscore; Brett McLaughlin; Alexandra Ashley Hughes	SLUMS; Alex JL Hiew; Inscore	3:06
3.	"Fools"	Sivan; Hope; Phillip "Pip" Norman	SLUMS; Hiew; Norman	3:40
4.	"Ease" (featuring Broods)	Sivan; Georgia Nott; Caleb Nott	C. Nott	3:34
5.	"The Quiet"	Sivan; Daniel Benjamin Cobbe	SLUMS; Hiew; Dann Hume	3:46
6.	"DKLA" (featuring Tkay Maidza)	Sivan; Hope; Hiew; Jean Capotorto; Takudzwa Maidza	SLUMS; Hiew	4:16
Total length:				22:10

== Charts ==
=== Weekly charts ===
Chart (2015)	Peak position
Australian Albums (ARIA)	1
Austrian Albums (Ö3 Austria)	17
Canadian Albums (Billboard)	6
Danish Albums (Hitlisten)	7
French Albums (SNEP)	96
Irish Albums (IRMA)	5
Italian Albums (FIMI)	48
New Zealand Albums (RMNZ)	3
Portuguese Albums (AFP)	27
Scottish Albums (Official Charts)	5
Swedish Albums (Sverigetopplistan)	11
Swiss Albums (Schweizer Hitparade)	29
UK Albums (Official Charts)	5
US Billboard 200	5

=== Year-end charts ===
Chart (2015)	Position
Australian Albums (ARIA)	79

== Certifications ==
Region	Certification	Certified units/sales
New Zealand (RMNZ)	Gold	7,500^{‡}
^{‡} Sales+streaming figures based on certification alone.

== Release history ==
Region	Date	Format	Label	Ref.
Various	4 September 2015	CD; digital download	EMI Australia; Capitol	
