= Party (Troye Sivan song) =

Single by Troye Sivan

from the album She's the Best
- Released: 17 September 2026
- Genre: House; downtempo; EDM
- Length: 3:21
- Label: Interscope
- Songwriters: Mirwais Ahmadzaï; Elvira Anderfjärd; Kaelyn Behr; Tove Burman; Madonna Ciccone; Luka Kloser; Leland; Rob LFO; Tyde Levi; Troye Sivan
- Producers: Styalz Fuego; Rob LFO; Tyde Levi; Troye Sivan

Troye Sivan singles chronology
"She's the Best" (2026)	"Party" (2026)	"FF" (2026)

Music video
- "Party" on YouTube

"Party" is a song by Australian singer Troye Sivan. It was released on 17 September 2026 through Interscope as the second single from his fourth studio album She's the Best. The song was produced by Sivan, his brother Tyde Levi, Styalz Fuego, and Rob LFO, and written by all four of them alongside Leland, Elvira Anderfjärd, Tove Burman, and Luka Kloser. The song is an ode to dancing with friends and strangers and loving the equality of the dance floor, and contains an interpolation of "Music" by Madonna, meaning she and co-writer Mirwais Ahmadzaï are also credited on the track. It was released alongside a music video featuring a voiceover by British actor Ian McKellen.

== Background ==
Sivan began teasing new music on 6 August 2026 in a series of cryptic social media posts, a headshot photo of him wearing theatrical makeup, updates to his official website, a video of posters with the initials "STB", and a series of pictures of Sivan and Addison Rae in elaborate wigs with a caption of the same initials, leading to speculation that a new album was on the way.

The album, She's the Best, was officially announced on 13 August alongside a teaser for the title track that lasted 14 seconds, with the end of the teaser revealing the song's release date. Additionally, the song was premiered live a day before release in promotion with TikTok. The title track was released the following day on 14 August 2026. Sivan revealed the full tracklist on 1 October, with "Party" featuring as the third song.

== Writing and composition ==
Lyrically, "Party" is a "hypnotic, euphoric ode to losing yourself in a night out, inspired by the cyclical rhythm of a weekend spent moving from place to place," and Sivan drew inspiration from the doofs that he attended growing up in Melbourne and from experiencing dance music. Of this, he explained, "dance music sounds very different on a dance floor than it does coming out of your laptop speaker. The repetition becomes almost hypnotic, and I wanted to play with structure in that way". It is the first official collaboration between Sivan and his brother Tyde, who both felt this was a natural progression of their musical relationship, having always made and shared music together while living in the same house.

Sonically, "Party" is a house, downtempo and EDM song. It interpolates "Music" by Madonna. Sivan later revealed that Madonna personally approved use of the song and stated, "she was lovely about it. Made it super easy. Madonna’s "Like a Prayer" is like one of my first things that I remember in my whole life. She’s always been important to me."

Background vocals provided by Australian Ballroom commentator and MC Rocky Stallone.

== Music video ==
The video for "Party" was filmed at a castle in Berkeley, Gloucestershire and was directed by Gordon von Steiner, who directed the video for "She's the Best" as well as the three videos from Sivan's Something to Give Each Other era. In the medieval-set video, Sivan stars as a knight who returns from battle to celebrate, hooking up with one of the dancers, and engaging in elaborate choreography with the inhabitants of the castle as they party. Of the concept, Sivan explained that he and von Steiner both take partying "quite seriously" and noted that, "it can be this very transcendent and almost spiritual experience … especially as queer people, I think that nightlife is often the first time that you find yourself in a space where you’re not the minority. So we were talking about it and … we were like, ‘Surely people have always partied in some capacity, and surely queer people have always partied in some capacity.’ And so it got us thinking: What would this party have looked like 100 years ago, 200 years ago? It just unlocked this whole feeling and world that was just so much fun to dig into." Ian McKellen, whom Sivan previously worked with in a production of Waiting for Godot in Perth when he was fourteen, provided an introductory voiceover, which Sivan felt was "important" because "it’s this idea of queer lineage and each generation setting the stage and showing the younger generation or the new generation: ‘This is where we gather and this is what we do, and this is one way to really connect with your community.’ I was so excited to ask him and so excited that he said yes". Sivan's siblings Tyde Levi and Sage Mellet also appear in the video.

Further discussing the video, Sivan explained, "I take partying so seriously is because I think that there’s a spiritual need, a human need to let loose. That’s what the “Party” video explores. In the visual for that, we were talking about partying and again how seriously I take it and how I do think it’s an innate human thing. Obviously people have always partied. In some capacity, people have always needed to let loose".

== Charts ==
=== Weekly charts ===
Weekly chart performance
Chart (2026)	Peak position
Australia (ARIA)	94
Czech Republic Airplay (ČNS IFPI)	30
Estonia Airplay (TopHit)	37
Israel TV Airplay (Media Forest)	3
Italy Airplay (EarOne)	40
Lithuania Airplay (TopHit)	79
New Zealand Hot Singles (RMNZ)	6
San Marino Airplay (SMRTV Top 50)	35
Ukraine Airplay (TopHit)	200
UK Singles Sales (Official Charts)	63
US Hot Dance/Pop Songs (Billboard)	13

=== Monthly charts ===
Monthly chart performance
Chart (2026)	Peak position
Estonia Airplay (TopHit)	42
