= The Melodics =

- Origin: Melbourne, Victoria, Australia
- Genres: Electro, hip-hop
- Years active: 2005–2011
- Label: Independent
- Past members: Oceans Baroque; Jeremedy; James Tudball; Jamie Barlow; Tarko Sibbel (aka Fantastic Mr Fox); Eric Budd
- Website: http://www.themelodicspaintmegold.com/

The Melodics were an Australian electro hip-hop band. They received national airplay on Triple J and toured nationally with Jackson Jackson and Phrase. During rapper tag #40 Jeremedy started that The Melodics were calling it quits and the last show would be at the Hi-Fi Bar in Melbourne on 4 November 2011.

Jeremedy started a solo project under the name of Grey Ghost while Jamie Barlow formed Indie electronic band Private Life

== Discography ==
- The Glen Schnieblic EP
- Naught n Crosses EP
- Live from Nowhere EP
- 4D (2009) - Remedy Music
- Paint Me Gold EP (2010) - Independent
- Last Ever Show Live at the Hi Fi - Live Album (Exclusive to concert attendees)
