= She's the Best =

Studio album by Troye Sivan
- Released: 9 October 2026
- Genres: Alternative dance; jazz; electroclash
- Length: 41:55
- Label: Interscope
- Producers: Jack Antonoff; Cirkut; George Daniel; Finneas; Oscar Görres; Jasper Harris; Tyde Levi; Rob LFO; Troye Sivan; Styalz Fuego

Troye Sivan chronology
Something to Give Each Other (2023)	She's the Best (2026)

Singles from She's the Best
- 1. "She's the Best" Released: 14 August 2026; 2. "Party" Released: 17 September 2026; 3. "FF" Released: 9 October 2026

She's the Best is the fourth studio album by the Australian singer Troye Sivan. It was released through Interscope Records on 9 October 2026. In advance of the release, the title track, "She's the Best", and "Party", were each released as singles. Another single, "FF", was released alongside the album.

At the 2026 J Awards, the album was nominated for Australian Album of the Year.

== Background ==
Sivan began teasing new music on 6 August 2026 in a series of cryptic social media posts, leading to speculation that a new album was on the way. The album, She's the Best, was officially announced on 13 August, along with the reveal of the cover art.

Sivan later told Rolling Stone that at the beginning of the project "my last album was this hypersexual, super-connected album that I wrote when I was feeling very much like a citizen of the world, at some point along the way, a disconnect started to form where I was going home to the hotel by myself, and I actually was feeling deeply lonely a lot of the time." He felt that this duality is reflected in She's the Best, stating, "there is this high-octane side to the album that feels really bombastic, and then there are the songs that feel like the interior of my mind" and calling it the most honest album of his career. He also said that his sonic influences for the album included Madonna, Kylie Minogue, the Avalanches, and King Krule, while the work of French author Annie Ernaux inspired him lyrically, and that all of the album's songs were written between 2025 and 2026 as he was unable to write while on tour. He identified "Love So Big It Hurts" and "Cowboy" as his favourite songs on the album.

Sivan revealed the full track list on 1 October 2026 and released a snippet of the song "Canada Dry". The following day, he performed "Party" live for the first time and debuted "Le Boy" during a guest appearance in Charli XCX's set at the Austin City Limits Music Festival.

=== Singles ===
The title track was released as the album's lead single on 14 August 2026, followed by "Party", on 17 September. "FF" was released as the third single alongside the album.

== Artwork ==
The album cover features Polish photographer, model, and vintage store owner Anna Bloda. She is pictured topless, except for two glitter-covered pasties, suggestively smoking a cigarette on an Astoria, New York, street corner. The cover was photographed by Jan Luca Hellwich and is a slightly edited frame taken from the music video for "She's the Best".

== Critical reception ==
Professional ratings
Aggregate scores
Source	Rating
AnyDecentMusic?	7.6/10
Metacritic	81/100
Review scores
Source	Rating
AllMusic	4.5/5 stars
Clash	8/10
Financial Times	3/5 stars
The Guardian	4/5 stars
The Line of Best Fit	8/10
MusicOMH	4/5 stars
NME	4/5 stars
Pitchfork	7.3/10
Rolling Stone Australia	5/5 stars
Slant Magazine	3/5 stars

Any Decent Music rated the album a weighted average score of 7.6 out of 10 from thirteen critic scores. According to Metacritic, it received "universal acclaim" based on a weighted average score of 81 out of 100 from thirteen critic scores.

== Track listing ==
She's the Best track listing
No.	Title	Writer(s)	Producer(s)	Length
1.	"She's the Best"	Troye Sivan; Jack Antonoff; Kaelyn Behr; George Daniel; Leland	Sivan; Antonoff; Daniel; Styalz Fuego	4:14
2.	"Canada Dry"	Sivan; Behr; Leland; Rob LFO; Tyde Levi	Sivan; Levi; Rob LFO; Styalz Fuego	3:21
3.	"Party"	Sivan; Mirwais Ahmadzaï; Elvira Anderfjärd; Behr; Tove Burman; Madonna Ciccone; Luka Kloser; Leland; Levi; Rob LFO	Sivan; Levi; Rob LFO; Styalz Fuego	3:21
4.	"I Do This for You"	Sivan; Antonoff; Jaspr Baj; Oscar Görres; Kevin Krakower; Leland; Britten Newbill; Carl Stephenson	Sivan; Antonoff; Görres	3:34
5.	"Cowboy"	Sivan; Antonoff; Daniel; Jack D'Arcy; Leland; Levi; Rob LFO	Antonoff; Daniel; Rob LFO; Levi	3:24
6.	"Embarrassingly"	Sivan; Görres; Alexandra Hughes; Leland	Sivan; Görres	3:31
7.	"Le Boy"	Sivan; Görres; Hughes; Leland	Görres	3:30
8.	"Sex Star"	Sivan; Lucy Healey; Leland; Finneas O'Connell	Finneas	3:08
9.	"Troye Meets World"	Sivan; Behr; Leland; Tayla Parx	Sivan; Antonoff; Styalz Fuego	2:43
10.	"FF"	Sivan; Antonoff; Daniel; Jasper Harris; Leland; Madison Love; Henry Walter	Antonoff; Cirkut; Daniel; Harris	4:22
11.	"Love So Big It Hurts"	Sivan; Görres; Leland	Görres	2:47
12.	"Lost Time" (featuring Lily-Rose Depp)	Sivan; Behr; Hughes; Leland	Sivan; Styalz Fuego	4:00
Total length:				41:55

=== Notes ===
- "Party" contains a sample and an interpolation of "Music", written by Madonna and Mirwais Ahmadzaï.
- "I Do This for You" contains a sample of "Dream", written by Jaspr Baj and Carl Stephenson and performed by Forest for the Trees.
- On streaming, “Party” and “Canada Dry” were swapped, making “Party” track 2 and “Canada Dry” track 3.

== Personnel ==
Credits:

=== Musicians ===
- Troye Sivan – lead vocals, background vocals (all tracks); synthesizer (tracks 9, 12), drum programming (9)
- Styalz Fuego – synthesizer (1–3, 9, 12), piano (1), drum programming (2, 3, 9, 12), background vocals (2)
- Jack Antonoff – programming (1, 4, 5, 9, 10), electric guitar (1, 4, 5, 10), sitar (1, 4); electric piano, Mellotron (1); drums (4, 5, 9, 10); acoustic guitar, synthesizer (4, 5, 10); harpsichord (4, 5), percussion (4, 9, 10), keyboards (5, 10); bass guitar, synth bass (10)
- George Daniel – synthesizer (1, 5, 10); drums, programming (1, 10); bass guitar, guitars, percussion (1); keyboards (5, 10)
- Sam Dew – background vocals (1)
- Rob LFO – drum programming, synthesizer (2, 3, 5); guitars (5)
- Tyde Levi – drum programming, synthesizer (2, 3, 5); guitars (5)
- Leland – background vocals (3, 10)
- Rocky Stallone – background vocals (3)
- Oscar Görres – bass guitar, drums, guitars, keyboards, percussion (4, 6–8, 11); programming (4, 6, 11), background vocals (6–8)
- Emily Jacobs – background vocals (4)
- Evan Smith – saxophone (5, 9, 10), flute (9, 10)
- Zem Audu – saxophone (5, 10)
- Bobby Hawk – strings (5, 10)
- Jack D'Arcy – additional vocals (5)
- Oli Jacobs – drum programming (5)
- Lucy Healey – additional vocals (8)
- Nikodimos – flute, guitars, piano, saxophone (9)
- Tayla Parx – additional vocals, background vocals (9)
- Jack Manning – piano (9)
- Donna Görres – background vocals (11)
- Lily-Rose Depp – additional vocals (12)
- Harts – guitars (12)

=== Technical ===
- Styalz Fuego – engineering (1–3, 9, 12)
- Oli Jacobs – engineering (1, 4, 5, 9, 10), mixing (5, 7, 8, 10–12)
- Laura Sisk – engineering (1, 4, 5, 9, 10), mixing (1, 4, 6)
- Jack Antonoff – engineering (1, 4, 5, 9, 10)
- Jack Manning – engineering (1, 4, 5, 9, 10)
- George Daniel – engineering (1, 5, 10)
- Troye Sivan – engineering (2, 3, 9)
- Rob LFO – engineering (3)
- Tyde Levi – engineering (3)
- Oscar Görres – engineering (4, 6, 7, 11)
- Jeremy Lertola – engineering (6–8)
- Different Sleep – engineering, vocal mixing (8)
- Cam Gilfoy – engineering assistance (4, 9), mixing assistance (4–8, 10–12)
- Jozef Caldwell – engineering assistance (5, 6, 10), mixing assistance (4–6, 10, 12)
- Dom Shaw – engineering assistance (4, 5, 10)
- Kellie McGrew – engineering assistance (4, 5, 10)
- Chiara Ferracuti – engineering assistance (5, 10)
- James Poucher – engineering assistance (5, 10)
- Joey Miller – engineering assistance (5, 9)
- Katie May – engineering assistance (5)
- Alex Ghenea – mixing (2, 3, 9)
- Ruairi O'Flaherty – mastering

== Charts ==
Chart performance for She's the Best
Chart (2026)	Peak position
Australian Albums (ARIA)	2
Austrian Albums (Ö3 Austria)	16
Belgian Albums (Ultratop Flanders)	3
Belgian Albums (Ultratop Wallonia)	10
Canadian Albums (Billboard)	61
Croatian International Albums (HDU)	40
Danish Vinyl Albums (Hitlisten)	8
Dutch Albums (Album Top 100)	12
French Albums (SNEP)	56
German Albums (Offizielle Top 100)	10
German Pop Albums (Offizielle Top 100)	7
Irish Albums (Official Charts)	44
Lithuanian Albums (AGATA)	98
New Zealand Albums (RMNZ)	8
Polish Albums (ZPAV)	23
Portuguese Albums (AFP)	31
Scottish Albums (Official Charts)	6
Swiss Albums (Schweizer Hitparade)	9
UK Albums (Official Charts)	9
US Billboard 200	22
