= Blue Neighbourhood =

Studio album by Troye Sivan
- Released: 4 December 2015
- Recorded: 2014–15
- Genres: Electropop; synth-pop
- Length: 36:49
- Labels: EMI Australia; Capitol
- Producers: Jack Antonoff; Emile Haynie; Alex JL Hiew; Alex Hope; Dann Hume; Bram Inscore; Pip Norman; Caleb Nott; SLUMS

Troye Sivan chronology
Wild (2015)	Blue Neighbourhood (2015)	Bloom (2018)

Singles from Blue Neighbourhood
- 1. "Youth" Released: 13 November 2015; 2. "Talk Me Down" Released: 26 May 2016; 3. "Wild" Released: 23 June 2016; 4. "Heaven" Released: 17 October 2016

Alternative cover
- 10th anniversary physical edition cover

Blue Neighbourhood is the debut studio album by Australian singer Troye Sivan. It was released internationally on 4 December 2015 via EMI Music Australia and Capitol Records. The album was preceded by Sivan's fourth extended play Wild, which served as a six-song opening installment to Blue Neighbourhood.

The album generated the singles "Wild", "Youth", "Talk Me Down" and "Heaven". "Wild" was remixed and re-released as a single with Alessia Cara.

== Release and promotion ==
On 13 October 2015, Sivan revealed that Wild served as an opening introduction to the album. Pre-orders for the album opened on 15 October 2015, with the album reaching No. 1 within hours on the iTunes Store in ten countries, including the United States. "Talk Me Down" was included as a promotional single to those who pre-ordered the album and was the only previously unreleased song made available before release. Those who had already purchased Wild received a discount to purchase Blue Neighbourhood. Sivan also launched merchandise bundles on his site, selling jumpers with the album logo, candles scented to match the mood of his songs, CDs, vinyl, posters, digital downloads, bags, and notebooks. On 22 May, Sivan performed at the 2016 Billboard Music Awards. On 28 August, Sivan performed at the pre-show of the 2016 MTV Video Music Awards. Sivan embarked on two concert tours to promote the album: the first is the Blue Neighbourhood Tour and later the Suburbia Tour.

On 5 December 2025, Sivan announced a 10th-anniversary edition of the album, which was released on 13 February 2026.

== Composition ==
Blue Neighbourhood has been described to be an electropop and synth-pop record with EDM, electronic music, electro, and R&B elements. Lyrical themes within the record include Sivan's experiences with love, youth, yearning, heartbreak, and affirmation. Critics have also compared the record to other musicians like Lorde, Taylor Swift, Sam Smith, Macklemore, and Adele.

== Singles ==
"Wild", originally released as the lead single from Sivan's extended play of the same name, was issued a remixed version featuring Canadian singer-songwriter Alessia Cara and was later released as the fourth single from the album on 23 June 2016. Following its release, Sivan re-released Blue Neighbourhood on iTunes, replacing "Wild (XXYYXX remix)" with the remixed version featuring Cara on the deluxe edition and adding it to the standard version as the last track. In addition, a Korean Special Edition of the album was released, featuring the TRXYE extended play tracks, the Blue Neighbourhood music video trilogy and the music video for "Youth".

"Youth" was released as the second single from the album. The song premiered exclusively on 12 November on Shazam Top 20 at 7PM AEST and was officially released worldwide after midnight in each country on 13 November. In early 2016, it reached the top 25 on the Billboard Hot 100, making it Sivan's most commercially successful single to date in North America.

"Talk Me Down" was later confirmed to be the third single from the album, being released on 26 May 2016.

On 17 October 2016, "Heaven" featuring fellow Australian singer Betty Who was released as the fifth single from the album. Sivan uploaded the audio for the song to his Vevo channel on YouTube and performed a solo version of the song on The Ellen DeGeneres Show the next day. The official music video for the song was set to be released on 20 January 2017 in order to coincide with the inauguration of Donald Trump, however, the video was released on Sivan's Vevo channel on 19 January, one day earlier than planned.

== Music videos ==
Prior to the album's announcement, the same day the Wild EP came out, a music video trilogy labelled under the umbrella term Blue Neighbourhood was confirmed. The trilogy follows the storyline of Sivan and his fictional childhood friend and love interest (played by Australian model Matthew Eriksson), and the struggles their same-sex relationship faces. The first two installments are for the songs "Wild" and "Fools" and both were released in September 2015. The last installment of the Blue Neighbourhood video trilogy is for "Talk Me Down" and was released on 20 October 2015. The video has an open ending, since it leaves the viewer with a shot of Sivan's love interest at the edge of a cliff and then cuts to a view of the sea. After the release of this installment, Sivan provided suicide prevention hotlines (for countries where they are available).

In December 2015, Sivan shared some giveaways with his fans for a whole week until Christmas through a website called 8 Days of Givaways. On 23 December 2015, the giveaway was a few black-and-white pictures from behind the scenes for the "Youth" music video. That music video was never released, and a new one was shot instead in early February 2016 and released on 24 February 2016.

Sivan confirmed that he filmed a music video for "Wild" with Alessia Cara in late June 2016.

On 19 January 2017, Sivan released a music video for "Heaven", however Betty Who was not seen in the music video, but her vocals were featured on the track.

== Critical reception ==
Professional ratings
Aggregate scores
Source	Rating
Metacritic	80/100
Review scores
Source	Rating
AllMusic	3.5/5 stars
Billboard	3.5/5 stars
The Guardian	5/5 stars
Herald Sun	4/5 stars
The Observer	4/5 stars
Rolling Stone	3/5 stars
Rolling Stone Australia	4/5 stars
South China Morning Post	4/5 stars
The Sydney Morning Herald	3.5/5 stars

The album received critical acclaim from music critics. At Metacritic, which assigns a normalised rating out of 100 to reviews from mainstream critics, the album received an average score of 80, based on 4 reviews, indicating "generally favourable reviews". Everett True from The Guardian gave the album five stars, commenting that "it is difficult to find fault with Blue Neighbourhood" and praising Sivan for "capturing the sound of now so well". Neil Z. Yeung from AllMusic praised Sivan's "sultry and effortless, wounded and breathless" voice as well as noting the album's themes of "heartbreak and affirmation" that make it "a sparkling, triumphant experience". Writing for Billboard, Kenneth Partridge commented that "in lieu of originality, Sivan sells vulnerability" as well as comparing the album's instrumentation to those of Lorde and Taylor Swift. Bernard Zuel from The Sydney Morning Herald described Sivan as having a "coffee-and-cream voice [...] artfully caught between childhood and adulthood."

Writers for Herald Sun praised Sivan's voice, calling it "fearless and honest in a way most pop stars aren't" as well as noting the openness of the album's lyrical content that does "not [shy] away from pronouns like many before him." Jules Lefevre from Rolling Stone Australia commenting that Sivan's vocals "[hover] amid electronic production that manages to be densely intricate and helium light" and that he "delivers these quiet gems of young wisdom with enough humility so as to be endearing rather than precocious."

=== Accolades ===
Award	Category	Recipients and nominees	Result
MTV Video Music Awards	Breakthrough Long Form Video	Blue Neighbourhood Trilogy	Nominated
ARIA Music Awards of 2016	Album of the Year	Blue Neighbourhood	Nominated
ARIA Music Awards of 2016	Best Male Artist	Blue Neighbourhood	Nominated
ARIA Music Awards of 2016	Best Pop Release	Blue Neighbourhood	Nominated
ARIA Music Awards of 2016	Song of the Year	"Youth"	Won
ARIA Music Awards of 2016	Best Video	"Youth" Acoustic (Sydney Session)	Won
ARIA Music Awards of 2016	Producer of the Year	Alex Hope for Troye Sivan – Blue Neighbourhood	Nominated
ARIA Music Awards of 2016	Engineer of the Year	Alex Hope for Troye Sivan – Blue Neighbourhood	Nominated

== Commercial performance ==
Blue Neighbourhood debuted at number 6 in Australia and 7 in the United States, selling 65,000 album-equivalent units (55,000 coming from pure album sales).

== Track listing ==
Standard edition
No.	Title	Writer(s)	Producer(s)	Length
1.	"Wild"	Troye Sivan; Alex Hope	Hope	3:47
2.	"Fools"	Sivan; Hope; Phillip "Pip" Norman	SLUMS; Alex JL Hiew; Norman	3:40
3.	"Ease" (featuring Broods)	Sivan; Caleb Nott; Georgia Nott	C. Nott	3:33
4.	"Talk Me Down"	Sivan; Bram Inscore; Brett McLaughlin; Alexandra Hughes; Emile Haynie	Haynie; Inscore	3:57
5.	"Cool"	Sivan; Hope	Hope	3:21
6.	"Heaven" (featuring Betty Who)	Sivan; Hope; Jack Antonoff; Claire Boucher	Antonoff	4:21
7.	"Youth"	Sivan; Inscore; McLaughlin; Hughes; Hope	Inscore; SLUMS; Hiew	3:05
8.	"Lost Boy"	Waenke; Sivan; Inscore; McLaughlin; Hughes	Inscore	3:43
9.	"For Him." (featuring Allday)	Sivan; Inscore; McLaughlin; Hughes; Tom Gaynor	Inscore	3:29
10.	"Suburbia"	Sivan; Inscore; McLaughlin; Hughes	Inscore	3:53
Total length:				36:49

Re-release bonus track
No.	Title	Writer(s)	Producer(s)	Length
11.	"Wild" (featuring Alessia Cara)	Sivan; Hope; Alessia Caracciolo	Hope	3:39
Total length:				40:28

Deluxe edition
No.	Title	Writer(s)	Producer(s)	Length
1.	"Wild"	Sivan; Hope	Hope	3:47
2.	"Bite"	Sivan; Inscore; McLaughlin; Hughes	SLUMS; Hiew; Inscore	3:06
3.	"Fools"	Sivan; Hope; Norman	SLUMS; Hiew; Norman	3:40
4.	"Ease" (featuring Broods)	Sivan; C. Nott; G. Nott	C. Nott	3:33
5.	"The Quiet"	Sivan; Daniel Benjamin Cobbe	SLUMS; Hiew; Dann Hume	3:46
6.	"DKLA" (featuring Tkay Maidza)	Sivan; Hope; Hiew; Jean Capotorto; Takudzwa Maidza	SLUMS; Hiew	4:15
7.	"Talk Me Down"	Sivan; Inscore; McLaughlin; Hughes; Haynie	Haynie; Inscore	3:57
8.	"Cool"	Sivan; Hope	Hope	3:21
9.	"Heaven" (featuring Betty Who)	Sivan; Hope; Antonoff; Boucher	Antonoff	4:21
10.	"Youth"	Sivan; Inscore; McLaughlin; Hughes; Hope	Inscore; SLUMS; Hiew	3:05
11.	"Lost Boy"	Sivan; Inscore; McLaughlin; Hope	Inscore	3:43
12.	"For Him." (featuring Allday)	Sivan; Inscore; McLaughlin; Hughes; Gaynor	Inscore	3:29
13.	"Suburbia"	Sivan; Inscore; McLaughlin; Hughes	Inscore	3:53
14.	"Too Good"	Sivan; Hope	SLUMS; Hiew; Hope	3:44
15.	"Blue" (featuring Alex Hope)	Sivan; Hope	Hope	3:31
16.	"Wild" (XXYYXX remix)	Sivan; Hope	Hope; XXYYXX (remixing)	3:32
Total length:				58:43

Target bonus tracks
No.	Title	Writer(s)	Producer(s)	Length
17.	"Swimming Pools"	Sivan; Inscore; McLaughlin; Hughes	Inscore	3:26
18.	"Happy Little Pill" (live version)	Sivan; Brandon Rogers; Tat Tong	Stacey Jones	4:02
Total length:				66:11

Digital 10th anniversary edition
No.	Title	Writer(s)	Producer(s)	Length
16.	"Wild" (featuring Alessia Cara)	Sivan; Hope; Caracciolo	Hope	3:39
17.	"Swimming Pools"	Sivan; Inscore; McLaughlin; Hughes	Inscore	3:24
18.	"Strawberries & Cigarettes"	Sivan; Antonoff; Hope	Antonoff	3:21
Total length:				65:37

== Charts ==
=== Weekly charts ===
Chart (2015–16)	Peak position
Australian Albums (ARIA)	6
Austrian Albums (Ö3 Austria)	49
Belgian Albums (Ultratop Flanders)	20
Belgian Albums (Ultratop Wallonia)	140
Canadian Albums (Billboard)	11
Danish Albums (Hitlisten)	19
Dutch Albums (Album Top 100)	25
Finnish Albums (Suomen virallinen lista)	32
German Albums (Offizielle Top 100)	73
Greek Albums (IFPI Greece)	44
Irish Albums (IRMA)	30
Italian Albums (FIMI)	78
Mexican Albums (AMPROFON)	19
New Zealand Albums (RMNZ)	3
Norwegian Albums (VG-lista)	17
Polish Albums (ZPAV)	49
Scottish Albums (Official Charts)	44
Swedish Albums (Sverigetopplistan)	10
Swiss Albums (Schweizer Hitparade)	66
UK Albums (Official Charts)	43
US Billboard 200	7

=== Year-end charts ===
Chart (2015)	Position
Australian Albums (ARIA)	67
Chart (2016)	Position
Australian Albums (ARIA)	60
Danish Albums (Hitlisten)	53
Mexican Albums (AMPROFON)	85
New Zealand Albums (RMNZ)	45
South Korean Albums International (Gaon)	16
South Korean Albums International (Gaon)	18
Swedish Albums (Sverigetopplistan)	92
US Billboard 200	53

== Certifications and sales ==
Region	Certification	Certified units/sales
Australia (ARIA)	Platinum	70,000^{‡}
Denmark (IFPI Danmark)	Gold	10,000^{‡}
New Zealand (RMNZ)	Platinum	15,000^{‡}
Singapore (RIAS)	Gold	5,000^{*}
South Korea	—	6,600
Sweden (GLF)	Gold	15,000^{‡}
United Kingdom (BPI)	Gold	100,000^{‡}
United States (RIAA)	Platinum	1,000,000^{‡}
^{*} Sales figures based on certification alone.^{‡} Sales+streaming figures based on certification alone.
