= Grey Ghost (musician) =

Australian musician and creative director

- Born: Jeremy Koren; 27 March 1984 (age 42); Melbourne, Victoria, Australia
- Genres: Hip hop, electro
- Occupations: Rapper, singer, visual artist, creative director
- Instrument: Vocals
- Years active: 2003–present
- Labels: EMI, Capitol Records
- Website: greyghost.com.au

Jeremy Koren (born 27 March 1984), known professionally as Grey Ghost, is an Australian hip hop recording artist, visual artist and director from Melbourne. He performed with several bands before signing with EMI and adopting the performance name Grey Ghost.

== Career ==
Koren started his career under the moniker 'Jeremedy' in 2003 and was the front man of bands Debt Collector, Caveman Science, The Inflatables and most notably Art-Rap experimental five-piece The Melodics. After The Melodics broke up, Jeremedy changed his performance name to Grey Ghost and signed to EMI, bringing out his self-titled debut EP with breakthrough single Space Ambassador, followed by Black Ghost Gold Chain.

== Discography ==
=== EPs ===
Year	Album
2012	Grey Ghost: Date released: 2012; Record label: EMI/Capitol
2013	The Elixir: Date released: 2013; Record label: EMI/Capitol

=== Singles ===
Year	Singles	Album
2012	“Space Ambassador”	Grey Ghost
2012	“Black Ghost Gold Chain”	Grey Ghost
2013	“The Elixir”	The Elixir EP
