= TRXYE =

EP by Troye Sivan
- Released: 15 August 2014
- Genres: Pop; electropop; dream pop
- Length: 17:22
- Label: EMI Australia
- Producers: Tat Tong; SLUMS; Alex JL Hiew

Troye Sivan chronology
The June Haverly (2012)	TRXYE (2014)	Wild (2015)

Singles from TRXYE
- 1. "Happy Little Pill" Released: 25 July 2014

TRXYE (pron. /tiː.ɑːr.ɛks.waɪ.iː/, "T-R-X-Y-E") is the third extended play (EP) by Australian singer Troye Sivan. Released on 15 August 2014 by EMI Music Australia, it is his major-label debut. The EP was preceded by the release of the singles "The Fault in Our Stars" and "Happy Little Pill".

== Background ==
On 5 June 2013, Sivan was signed to EMI Music Australia, a Universal Music Australia label, but did not reveal this information until a year later. On 26 June 2014, he announced (while at VidCon) that he would release a five-song EP on 15 August 2014, and uploaded a YouTube video simultaneously on his channel revealing the cover art of the EP.

== Singles ==
"The Fault in Our Stars" was released on 5 May 2013 as a campaign to help raise money for the Princess Margaret Hospital Foundation in Perth, Australia. The song had great success, and Sivan added an updated version of the song to the EP. A new version of the song was released as a promotional single on 13 June 2014. This version was included on the EP. "Happy Little Pill" was released on 25 July 2014 as the first official single from the EP. It charted in thirteen countries, including the United States where it reached number 92 on the Billboard Hot 100.

== Commercial performance ==
Professional ratings
Review scores
Source	Rating
AllMusic	3.5/5 stars

TRXYE debuted at number five in the United States, selling 30,000 copies after only three days of sales. By July 2015, the EP had a combined download of its five tracks of 371,000 in the United States, and 73,000 copies of the album in sales with 39 million streams by September 2015. In Australia, sales of the EP counted towards the single "Happy Little Pill", causing the single to rise from number 34 to number 10 for the week commencing 24 August 2014.

== Track listing ==
CD and digital download
No.	Title	Writer(s)	Producer(s)	Length
1.	"Happy Little Pill"	Troye Sivan; Brandon Rogers; Tat Tong	SLUMS; Alex JL Hiew; Tat Tong	3:44
2.	"Touch"	Sivan; Thomas Rawle	SLUMS; Alex JL Hiew; Matt Gio	3:35
3.	"Fun"	Sivan; Alex Hope; Lindsay Rimes	SLUMS; Alex JL Hiew; Lindsay Rimes	3:26
4.	"Gasoline"	Sivan; Paul Carter	SLUMS; Alex JL Hiew; Matt Gio	3:25
5.	"The Fault in Our Stars (MMXIV)"	Sivan	Dan Heath	3:12
Total length:				17:22

== Charts ==
Chart (2014)	Peak position
Canadian Albums (Billboard)	2
French Albums (SNEP)	177
New Zealand Albums (RMNZ)	2
US Billboard 200	5

== Release history ==
Region	Date	Format	Label
Australia	15 August 2014	CD; digital download	EMI Australia
