= She's the Best (song) =

2026 single by Troye Sivan

Single by Troye Sivan

from the album She's the Best
- Released: 14 August 2026
- Genre: Alternative pop; trip hop
- Length: 4:14
- Label: Interscope
- Songwriters: Troye Sivan; George Daniel; Jack Antonoff; Leland; Kaelyn Behr
- Producers: Troye Sivan; George Daniel; Styalz Fuego; Jack Antonoff

Troye Sivan singles chronology
"Talk Talk" (2024)	"She's the Best" (2026)	"Party" (2026)

Music video
- "She's the Best" on YouTube

"She's the Best" is a song by Australian singer Troye Sivan. It was released on 14 August 2026 through Interscope as the lead single and title track to his fourth studio album She's the Best. Produced by Sivan alongside Jack Antonoff, Kaelyn Behr, and George Daniel, and co-written by the quartet alongside Leland, the track celebrates femininity and womanhood. It was released alongside a music video featuring Australian actress Nicole Kidman, American drag performer Sasha Colby, and Sivan's sister Sage.

At the 2026 ARIA Music Awards it was nominated for Best Solo Artist, Best Pop Release while Styalz Fuego was nominated for Best Engineered Release and Best Produced Release.

== Background ==
Sivan began teasing new music on 6 August 2026 in a series of cryptic social media posts, a headshot photo of him wearing theatrical makeup, updates to his official website, a video of posters with the initials "STB", and a series of pictures of Sivan and Addison Rae in elaborate wigs with a caption of the same initials, leading to speculation that a new album was on the way.

The album, She's the Best, was officially announced on 13 August alongside a teaser for the title track that lasted 14 seconds, with the end of the teaser revealing the song's release date. Additionally, the song was premiered live a day before release in promotion with TikTok.

Sivan revealed the full tracklist on 1 October, with "She's the Best" featuring as the first song. Of the song, Sivan wrote on Instagram, “Boys have come and gone, work has come and gone, but I have always, always had my girls. My whole life I’ve existed in the orbit of incredible women. This is my love letter to them. Walk down the street today w your headphones in and listen to the song and look around - the divine feminine is everywhere!!!! Thank God!!”

== Lyrics and composition ==
Lyrically, "She's the Best" is an adoring portrait of an unnamed woman, with Sivan narrating everything about her. Sivan described the song as a love letter to the women in his life and those who have influenced him and explained, “to be able to have made music with Ariana or Lily-Rose Depp, then touring with Charli and growing up alongside her…I’ve always just loved being in the orbit of these women. ‘She’s the Best’ was the first time I wasn’t trying to psychoanalyze myself, and I wasn’t writing about men, the one thing that has been constant in my whole life is the women in my life, and the feminine people in my life.”

Sonically, the track is a departure from Sivan's previous dance-pop work features a more alternative sound, including a trip hop beat, distorted guitars, and spoken word vocals.

Sivan reconnected with Jack Antonoff for the song, who produces alongside him, George Daniel, and Styalz Fuego. Sivan and Antonoff first worked together on his 2015 single "Youth". Of this, Sivan explained, "something that I love about Jack [is] the way that he works is everything is set up and ready to go. He’s got obviously the most insane gear, and he’s a very, very talented multi-instrumentalist. The process is so alive and vibrant. He’ll walk up to something and play it, and he will play it maybe twice, and then he moves over to the next thing. It’s this very free process, and so that was inspiring."

The track includes an uncredited cameo from Sivan's close friend Charli XCX, marking their fourth collaboration after "1999", "2099", and "Talk Talk". Sivan stated that her appearance was meaningful to him and Daniel, whom she married in September 2025, with Sivan stating, “I don’t want to speak for him, but I think for both George and I, Charli is obviously a very, very, very special person to both of us, and so to have her on that song in some small way is very meaningful to us.”

== Music video ==
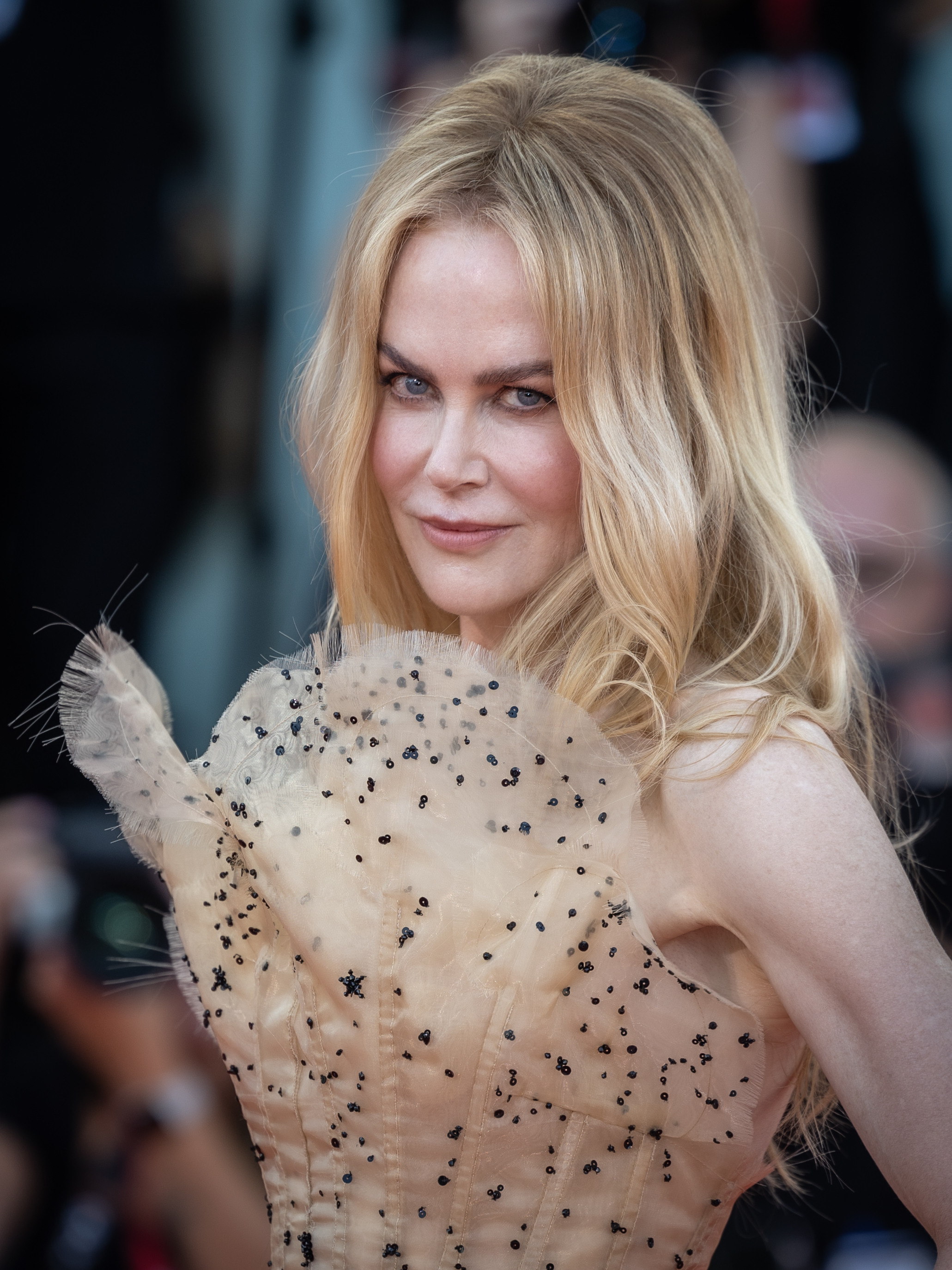
The video stars Australian actress and Sivan's former co-star Nicole Kidman.

Before its release, a trailer for the video was posted online, featured figures dressed in sequined gowns and oversized fur coats, a glowing neon “SISTERS” sign and Sivan walking through city streets in a tailored suit before ending with stylized title cards revealing the video's release date.

Australian actress Nicole Kidman stars in the video, whom Sivan had first met and worked with on the 2018 film Boy Erased, where she had shared her phone number with him. Of Kidman, Sivan stated, “she’s always just been such a picture of the divine feminine to me,” and said that he had sent her the song, alongside some references for the video and a short note of him explaining the meaning behind the track and why he wanted her to appear in the video and was shocked when she agreed without any additional requests or conditions. Kidman contacted Sivan from an unknown number while he was in a Zoom meeting and Sivan explained, “I let it go to voicemail, and then I see the transcription starts coming, it’s like, ‘Hi darling Troye, it’s Nic.’ I slammed my laptop shut and just ended the meeting.”

The video was released simultaneously with the song itself on 14 August 2026 and was directed by Gordon Von Steiner, who directed the three music videos from Sivan's previous album Something to Give Each Other: "Rush", "Got Me Started", and "One of Your Girls". In the video, Kidman arrives at a club, walking through the dressing room where drag performers, including Sasha Colby, are preparing for a show. Kidman then arrives at the bar and has a drink while she watches Sivan singing before the two dance together. The video is interspersed with clips of Sivan singing in various locations around the city, and with clips of women including his sister, Sage Mellet. Sivan also briefly reprises his drag alter ego from the "One of Your Girls" video in a few scenes with Kidman.

== Charts ==
Chart performance
Chart (2026)	Peak position
Australian Artist Singles (ARIA)	6
Lithuania Airplay (TopHit)	88
New Zealand Hot Singles (RMNZ)	12
Slovakia Airplay (ČNS IFPI)	91
UK Singles Sales (Official Charts)	49
