= Talk Me Down =

Single by Troye Sivan

from the album Blue Neighbourhood
- Released: 26 May 2016
- Recorded: 2014
- Genre: Pop
- Length: 3:57
- Label: EMI Australia; Capitol; Polydor
- Songwriters: Troye Sivan; Bram Inscore; Brett McLaughlin; Alexandra Hughes; Emile Haynie
- Producers: Haynie; Inscore

Troye Sivan singles chronology
"Youth" (2015)	"Talk Me Down" (2016)	"Wild" (2016)

Music video
- "Talk Me Down" on YouTube

"Talk Me Down" (stylized in all caps) is a song by Australian singer-songwriter Troye Sivan from his debut studio album Blue Neighbourhood (2015). It was written by Sivan, Bram Inscore, Brett McLaughlin, Allie X, and Emile Haynie, and was produced by Haynie and Inscore. The song was first released as a promotional single along with the pre-order of the album on 16 October 2015, and was released as the third official single on 26 May 2016.

== Critical reception ==
"Talk Me Down" has received generally positive reviews from critics, who praised its mature themes and dramatic production. In a review of Blue Neighbourhood, Everett True of The Guardian wrote that "the spine-chilling Talk Me Down out-Macklemore’s [sic] Macklemore with its unashamed and unforgiving look at the lasting effects of homophobia."

Jules Lefevre of Rolling Stone Australia complimented the song's pop sensibilities, writing that the "pillowy" and "orchestral" sound of "Talk Me Down" is bellied by an "unshakeable chorus hook." The Herald Sun called the song's melancholic production "glorious" and "perfect for the story being told."

== Music video ==
The music video for "Talk Me Down" is the third and final installment in Sivan's "Blue Neighbourhood" trilogy. It was directed by Tim Mattia and premiered 20 October 2015.

== Live performances ==
"Talk Me Down" is included in the setlist for Sivan's Blue Neighbourhood Tour, serving as the thirteenth and final song in the standard set. His performance of the track was cited as a highlight of the show by Megan Downing of MTV UK, who attended the 19 April 2016 show at the O_{2} Shepherd's Bush Empire in London, England and wrote that "Talk Me Down" "gave us ALL the feels."

== Charts and certifications ==
=== Weekly charts ===
Weekly chart performance for "Talk Me Down"
Chart (2015)	Peak position
Australia (ARIA)	36
Belgium (Ultratip Bubbling Under Flanders)	21
New Zealand Heatseekers (Recorded Music NZ)	4
UK Singles (Official Charts Company)	118

=== Certifications ===
Certifications for "Talk Me Down"
Region	Certification	Certified units/sales
Australia (ARIA)	Gold	35,000^{‡}
Brazil (Pro-Música Brasil)	Gold	30,000^{‡}
United States (RIAA)	Gold	500,000^{‡}
^{‡} Sales+streaming figures based on certification alone.

== Release history ==
Release dates and formats for "Talk Me Down"
Region	Date	Format	Label	Ref.
Worldwide	16 October 2015 (Note: Release as a promotional single.)	Digital download	EMI Australia; Capitol	
United Kingdom	26 May 2016	Contemporary hit radio	Polydor	
