= Heaven (Troye Sivan song) =

2016 song by Troye Sivan

Single by Troye Sivan featuring Betty Who

from the album Blue Neighbourhood
- Released: 17 October 2016
- Length: 4:21
- Label: EMI Australia; Capitol; Polydor
- Songwriter(s): Troye Sivan; Alex Hope; Jack Antonoff; Claire Boucher
- Producer(s): Jack Antonoff

Troye Sivan singles chronology
"Wild" (2016)	"Heaven" (2016)	"There for You" (2017)

Betty Who singles chronology
"I Love You Always Forever" (2016)	"Heaven" (2016)	"Human Touch" (2016)

Music video
- "Heaven" on YouTube

"Heaven" (stylised in all caps) is a song by Australian singer-songwriter Troye Sivan featuring fellow Australian singer-songwriter Betty Who. The song was released as the fifth and final single from his debut studio album Blue Neighbourhood (2015) on 17 October 2016. It was written by Sivan, Alex Hope, Jack Antonoff and Claire Boucher.

== Background ==
The song details Sivan’s struggle with coming out as gay. He explains "When I first started to realise that I might be gay, I had to ask myself all these questions—these really really terrifying questions. Am I ever going to find someone? Am I ever going to be able to have a family? If there is a God, does that God hate? If there is a heaven, am I ever going to make it to heaven?" He refers to the track as "the most important song" he has ever made.

In an interview with Vulture magazine, Sivan said; "I came to the point where I wanted to delve into something a bit more specific about my experience as a gay man. I went into the studio and had to revisit some pretty uncomfortable and sometimes painful memories of what it was like to be 15 years old and in the closet. I started writing this song called "Heaven" about that experience." Sivan added he was inspired by the documentary How to Survive a Plague.

== Music video ==
The music video for "Heaven" was directed by Luke Gilford and released on 19 January 2017. According to a representative, Sivan was going to release the video on 20 January, to coincide with Donald Trump's inauguration. However, the release was forward a day due to an overwhelming response from fans to teasers for the clip.

The black and white clip, sees Sivan being embraced by a man whose face is not shown, although it was later proven that it was the singer's boyfriend, Jacob Bixenman, while being soaked in the rain and pays homage to the LGBTQ movements and accomplishments that have come before him. The clip shows assassinated gay rights leader Harvey Milk alongside footage of Pride parades and same-sex weddings.

Sivan's message that accompanied the clip read; "We have always been here. we will always be here. this video is dedicated to all who’ve come before me and fought for our cause and those who now continue the fight. in dark and light times, let’s love forever."

=== Reception ===
Jenna Romaine from Billboard called the video "powerful" and "stunning". David Renshaw from The Fader called the video "moving".

== Live performances ==
Sivan performed "Heaven" on The Ellen DeGeneres Show on 18 October 2016.

He also performed "Heaven" as a part of his set at We the Fest 2019 in Jakarta on 19 July 2019. During this song, a pride flag illuminates the background.
