= Wild (Troye Sivan song) =

2015 single by Troye Sivan

Single by Troye Sivan

from the EP Wild and the album Blue Neighbourhood
- Released: 3 September 2015
- Genre: Synth-pop
- Length: 3:47
- Label: EMI Australia; Capitol
- Songwriters: Troye Sivan; Alex Hope
- Producer: Hope

Troye Sivan singles chronology
"Papercut" (2015)	"Wild" (2015)	"Youth" (2015)

Music video
- "Wild" on YouTube

"Wild" (stylised in all caps) is a song by Australian singer-songwriter Troye Sivan from his fourth extended play (EP), Wild (2015). It was written by Sivan and Alex Hope, and a revised version features a contribution from Alessia Cara. The song was released on 3 September 2015 and promoted as its lead single. It is also featured on Sivan's debut studio album, Blue Neighbourhood (2015).

== Music video ==
The song's accompanying music video was directed by Tim Mattia and released as part of Sivan's "Blue Neighbourhood" music video trilogy. The trilogy made up of "Wild", "Fools" and "Talk Me Down" was filmed in the Sydney suburb of Kurnell, New South Wales.

== Chart performance ==
The song reached number 16 on the ARIA Charts, becoming his second top 20 single and peaking within the top 40 in New Zealand.

== Charts and certifications ==
=== Weekly charts ===
Weekly chart performance for "Wild"
Chart (2015)	Peak position
Australia (ARIA)	16
Canada Hot 100 (Billboard)	72
Czech Republic Singles Digital (ČNS IFPI)	49
Ireland (IRMA)	62
New Zealand (Recorded Music NZ)	29
Scottish Singles Sales (Official Charts)	50
Spain (Promusicae)	50
Sweden Heatseeker (Sverigetopplistan)	6
UK Singles (Official Charts)	62
US Bubbling Under Hot 100 (Billboard)	4

=== Certifications ===
Certifications for "Wild"
Region	Certification	Certified units/sales
Australia (ARIA)	3× Platinum	210,000^{‡}
Canada (Music Canada)	Platinum	80,000^{‡}
New Zealand (RMNZ)	Platinum	15,000^{*}
United Kingdom (BPI)	Silver	200,000^{‡}
United States (RIAA)	Platinum	1,000,000^{‡}
^{*} Sales figures based on certification alone.^{‡} Sales+streaming figures based on certification alone.

== Release history ==
Release dates and formats for "Wild"
Region	Date	Format	Label	Ref.
Australia	4 September 2015	Digital download	EMI Australia	

== Alessia Cara re-release ==
"Wild"

Single by Troye Sivan featuring Alessia Cara

from the album Blue Neighbourhood
- Released: 23 June 2016
- Length: 3:39
- Label: EMI Australia; Capitol
- Songwriters: Troye Sivan; Alex Hope; Alessia Caracciolo (add.)
- Producer: Hope

Troye Sivan singles chronology
"Talk Me Down" (2016)	"Wild" (2016)	"Heaven" (2016)

Alessia Cara singles chronology
"Wild Things" (2016)	"Wild" (2016)	"Scars to Your Beautiful" (2016)

Music video
- "Wild ft. Alessia Cara" on YouTube

A new version of the song was re-released on 23 June 2016, featuring a new verse from Canadian singer and songwriter Alessia Cara. On 28 June 2016, it impacted top 40 radio stations in the United States as the fourth single from his debut studio album Blue Neighbourhood.

=== Background ===
The concept came about after Sivan met Cara at several music events. He had covered Cara's hit single "Here" for a live radio show and she responded with a cover of his track "Youth". In phone text conversations, the two performers joked about which song was next. Cara told Sivan her favourite song of his was "Wild" and shortly afterwards wrote and recorded a verse in a European studio. When she sent it to Sivan, he says his response was: "This is so good, we have to put it out."

=== Music video ===
On 22 July 2016, a new video for the single was released on Sivan's Vevo and YouTube channel. The video features both singers and was directed by Malia James and produced by Taylor Vandegrift and Danny Lockwood. It was filmed in Toronto, Canada, near Cara's home.

=== Chart performance ===
The re-released new version reached number 26 in its own right on the Australian ARIA Charts.

=== Track listing ===
Digital download
No.	Title	Length
1.	"Wild" (featuring Alessia Cara)	3:39

=== Charts ===
==== Weekly charts ====
Weekly chart performance for "Wild (Remix)"
Chart (2016)	Peak position
Australia (ARIA)	16
Belgium (Ultratip Bubbling Under Flanders)	12
Belgium (Ultratip Bubbling Under Wallonia)	50
US Bubbling Under Hot 100 (Billboard)	4
US Pop Airplay (Billboard)	30

=== Release history ===
Release dates and formats for "Wild (Remix)"
Region	Date	Format	Label	Ref.
United States	23 June 2016	Digital download	EMI Australia; Capitol	
United States	28 June 2016	Top 40 radio	Capitol	
