= Troye Sivan =

Australian singer and actor (born 1995)

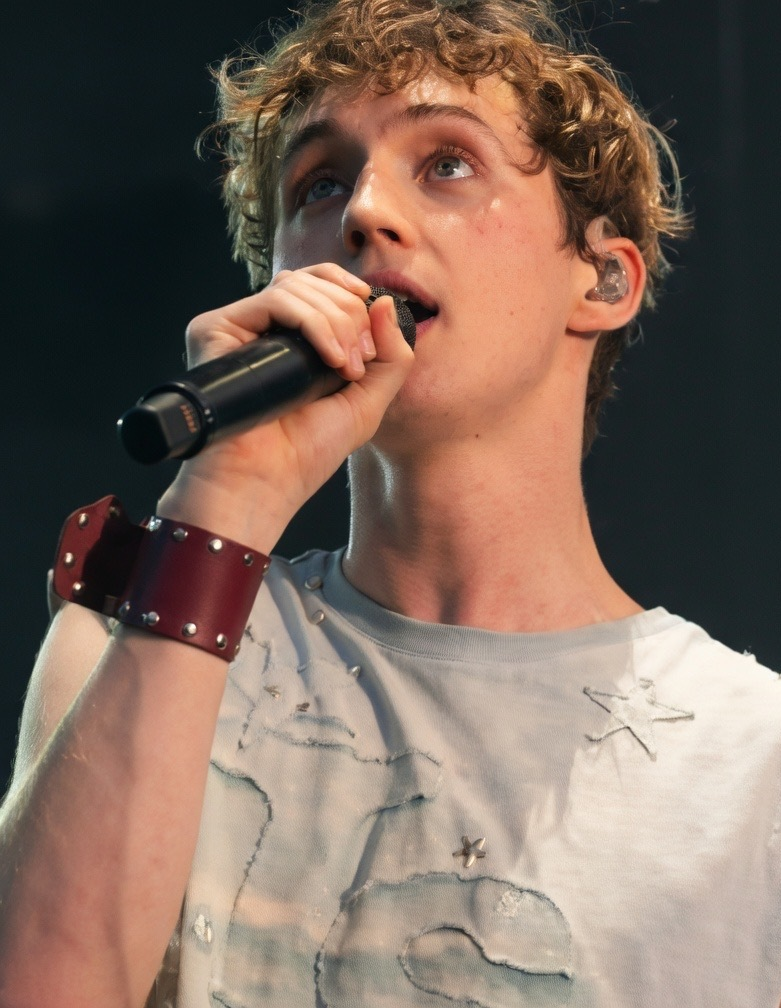
- Sivan in 2024
- Born: Troye Sivan Mellet; 5 June 1995 (age 31); Johannesburg, South Africa
- Occupations: Singer-songwriter; actor
- Years active: 2006–present
- Awards: Full list
- Musical career
- Origin: Perth, Western Australia
- Genres: Pop; synth-pop; electropop; dance-pop
- Instrument: Vocals
- Works: Troye Sivan discography
- Labels: EMI Australia; Capitol; Interscope

YouTube information
- Channel: TroyeSivan
- Years active: 2007–present
- Subscribers: 8.22 million
- Views: 2.22 billion
- Last updated: 15 April 2026
- Website: troyesivan.com

Troye Sivan Mellet (/ˈtrɔɪ sɪˈvɑːn/ TROY sih-VAHN; born 5 June 1995) is an Australian singer-songwriter and actor. After gaining popularity as a singer on YouTube and in Australian talent competitions, Sivan signed with EMI Australia in 2013. He earned early recognition for his extended plays (EPs) TRXYE (2014) and Wild (2015); the former peaked at number five on the US Billboard 200, while his debut single, "Happy Little Pill", reached the top 10 in Australia. As of 2024, Sivan has sold 10 million albums worldwide.

In 2015, Sivan released his first full-length album, Blue Neighbourhood, featuring the multi-platinum single "Youth", which became his first top 40 hit on the US Billboard Hot 100. His second studio album, Bloom (2018), charted near the top in Australia and the US, while its lead single, "My My My!", became Sivan's second number-one single on the Billboard Dance Club Songs chart. His third studio album, Something to Give Each Other (2023), topped the ARIA Albums chart. It produced the singles "Rush" and "Got Me Started", which earned him three Grammy Award nominations. His fourth album, She's the Best (2026), was led by its title track.

As an actor, Sivan portrayed the younger Wolverine in X-Men Origins: Wolverine (2009) and starred as the title character in the Spud film trilogy (2010–2014). In 2017, he became the youngest recipient of the GLAAD Stephen F. Kolzak Award. In 2018, he received a Golden Globe nomination for Best Original Song for "Revelation", from the film Boy Erased, in which he also had a supporting acting role. He has since starred in the film Three Months (2022) and the HBO series The Idol (2023). In 2020, Rolling Stone Australia named him one of the country's 50 greatest artists of all time.

== Early life and education ==
Sivan was born on 5 June 1995 in Johannesburg, South Africa, the son of Laurelle Mellet, a homemaker and former South African fashion model, and Shaun Mellet, an entrepreneur and real estate agent. At age two, Sivan moved to Perth, Western Australia, with his parents and three siblings which his parents claim was due to rising crime in South Africa. He was raised in an Orthodox Jewish family, though he does not consider himself to be religious. His mother converted to Judaism when marrying his father, who is of Lithuanian-Jewish descent including from a grandmother who escaped from Lithuania to Johannesburg as a Holocaust survivor. He attended Carmel School, a private Modern Orthodox school, until 2009, when he started distance education.

== Career ==
=== Music ===
Sivan's musical career started when he sang at the 2006, 2007 and 2008 Channel Seven Perth Telethon. His 2006 performance included a duet with Australian Idol winner Guy Sebastian. Sivan made it to the finals of StarSearch 2007. His debut EP Dare to Dream was released in June 2007. In February 2010, Sivan opened "We Are the World 25 for Haiti (YouTube edition)", the collaborative music charity video produced by Lisa Lavie to help raise money for the victims of the 2010 Haiti earthquake.

On 5 June 2013, Sivan was signed to EMI Australia, a Universal Music Australia label, but kept it a secret until a year later. On 15 August 2014 he released a five-song EP entitled TRXYE, led by its first single "Happy Little Pill", which was released on 25 July 2014. TRXYE debuted at No. 1 on iTunes in over 55 countries. The EP debuted at No. 5 on the Billboard 200 the following week, scoring Sivan his first Top 10 album. "Happy Little Pill" peaked at number 10 on the ARIA Singles Chart and was certified gold by the Australian Recording Industry Association for shipments exceeding 35,000 copies.

Sivan released his second major-label EP, Wild, on 4 September 2015. The EP was supported by a music video trilogy entitled Blue Neighbourhood, comprising the three songs "Wild", "Fools" and "Talk Me Down" and released from September 2015 to December 2015. Next, he recorded a full-length album titled Blue Neighbourhood, which was released on 4 December 2015. The single "Youth" reached number 23 in the Billboard Hot 100. Sivan supported Blue Neighbourhood and Wild with his first tour, 2015's Troye Sivan Live. He followed this with 2016's Blue Neighbourhood Tour and Suburbia Tour. On 26 May 2017, Troye collaborated with Martin Garrix to produce the song "There for You".

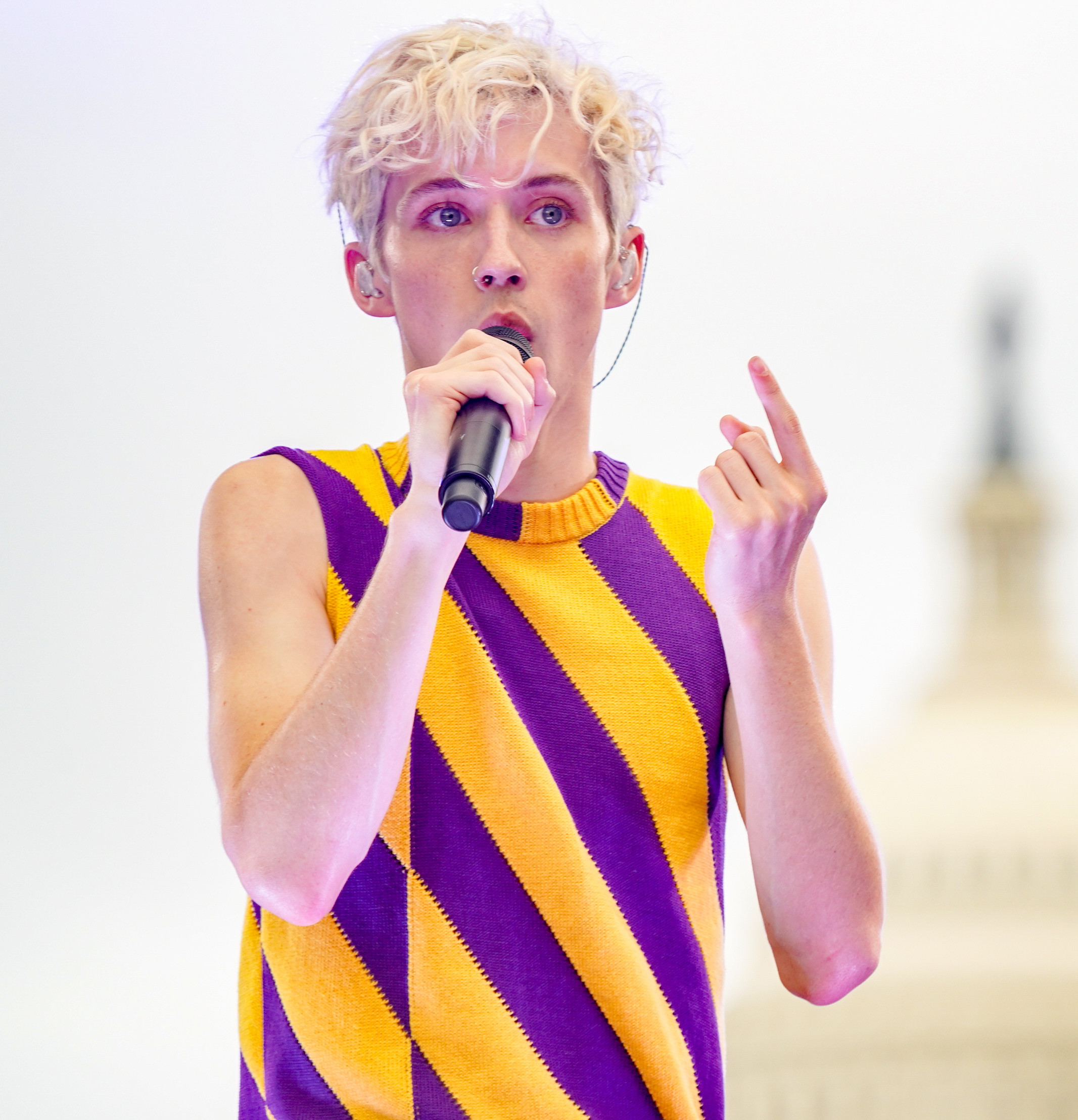
Sivan performing at Capital Pride in Washington, DC, in 2018

On 10 January 2018, Sivan released the single "My My My!", along with an accompanying music video. He confirmed that his second album was inspired by his then-boyfriend, American model Jacob Bixenman. The song was described as a departure from his earlier work, with Pitchfork calling his vocals "assured" and NPR Music describing it as "an infectious celebration of sexual desire". NPR also noted the significance of the song and music video displaying confidence in Sivan's sexuality, writing "it's not every day you see a young, skinny, queer kid get to be completely himself in a music video, and Sivan makes us want to dance along with him." Sivan's first live performance of the song was on 20 January as the musical guest on Saturday Night Live in an episode hosted by Jessica Chastain. Sivan later confirmed that his new album would feature a collaboration with long-time friend Ariana Grande, titled "Dance to This".

On 16 March, his song "Strawberries & Cigarettes" from the Love, Simon soundtrack was released. It received a nomination for the 2018 Satellite Awards for Best Original Song. "Bloom" was released as the third single on 2 May 2018, following "The Good Side". That month, he announced that his second studio album was titled Bloom, while accompanying Taylor Swift as a guest performer at a concert in Pasadena during her Reputation Stadium Tour. The album was released on 31 August 2018. The album's final pre-release track, "Animal", was launched on 9 August 2018. That same year, Sivan received a Golden Globe nomination for Best Original Song for "Revelation", which he recorded and co-wrote for the film Boy Erased. He was also shortlisted for an Academy Award for the song. In October 2018, Sivan collaborated with British singer-songwriter Charli XCX on the single "1999"; the two also performed the single together live on The Tonight Show Starring Jimmy Fallon. A sequel collaboration, titled "2099", was debuted on 6 June 2019 at the two artists' LA Pride event "Go West Fest" and released as a promotional single from Charli XCX's album Charli on 10 September 2019. In January 2019, Sivan released the single "I'm So Tired..." with American singer-songwriter Lauv.

On 1 April 2020, Sivan released "Take Yourself Home", his first single from his fifth EP In a Dream. Sivan worked with freelance artists in need of work during the COVID-19 pandemic to create the visual art for his single. The artists, who Sivan met on Instagram, also designed t-shirts for the single, and all net proceeds were donated to the WHO COVID-19 Solidarity Response Fund and Spotify's COVID-19 Music Relief Project. On 15 July, Sivan released the single "Easy" and announced the release of the concept EP In a Dream. The EP was released on 21 August 2020. In June 2021, he performed songs from the EP for Grubhub's virtual concert series Sound Bites, in support of the NGLCC's efforts in assisting LGBTQ-owned restaurants during the COVID-19 pandemic. On 16 April 2021, his collaboration "You" with Regard and Tate McRae was released. The song topped Billboard's Dance/Electronic Songs chart for eight weeks. Sivan's single "Angel Baby" was released on 10 September. After becoming viral in Southeast Asia, it charted highly in several countries. In February 2022, two original songs Sivan had written for the film Three Months were released. In December 2022, he released a collaboration with PNAU titled "You Know What I Need".

Sivan announced his third studio album, Something to Give Each Other, on 13 July 2023, alongside the release of its lead single, "Rush". On 20 September, the second single, "Got Me Started", was released with an accompanying music video. The album was released on 13 October, along with the third single, "One of Your Girls". On 10 November 2023, Sivan received two Grammy nominations for "Rush": Best Music Video and Best Pop Dance Recording. The album's fourth single, "Honey", was released on 16 May 2024 with remixes by Mura Masa.

On 12 September 2024, Troye was featured on Charli XCX's remix album Brat and It's Completely Different but Also Still Brat, the remix album of Brat, on the song "Talk Talk". A voice note from Dua Lipa is featured in the beginning and end of the song. They embarked on the co-headlining Sweat tour in North America in support of Brat and Something to Give Each Other.

Sivan announced his fourth studio album, She's the Best, on 13 August 2026. The title track was released the following day.

In 2026, Sivan signed with Interscope Records, a subsidiary of Universal Music Group.

=== Acting ===
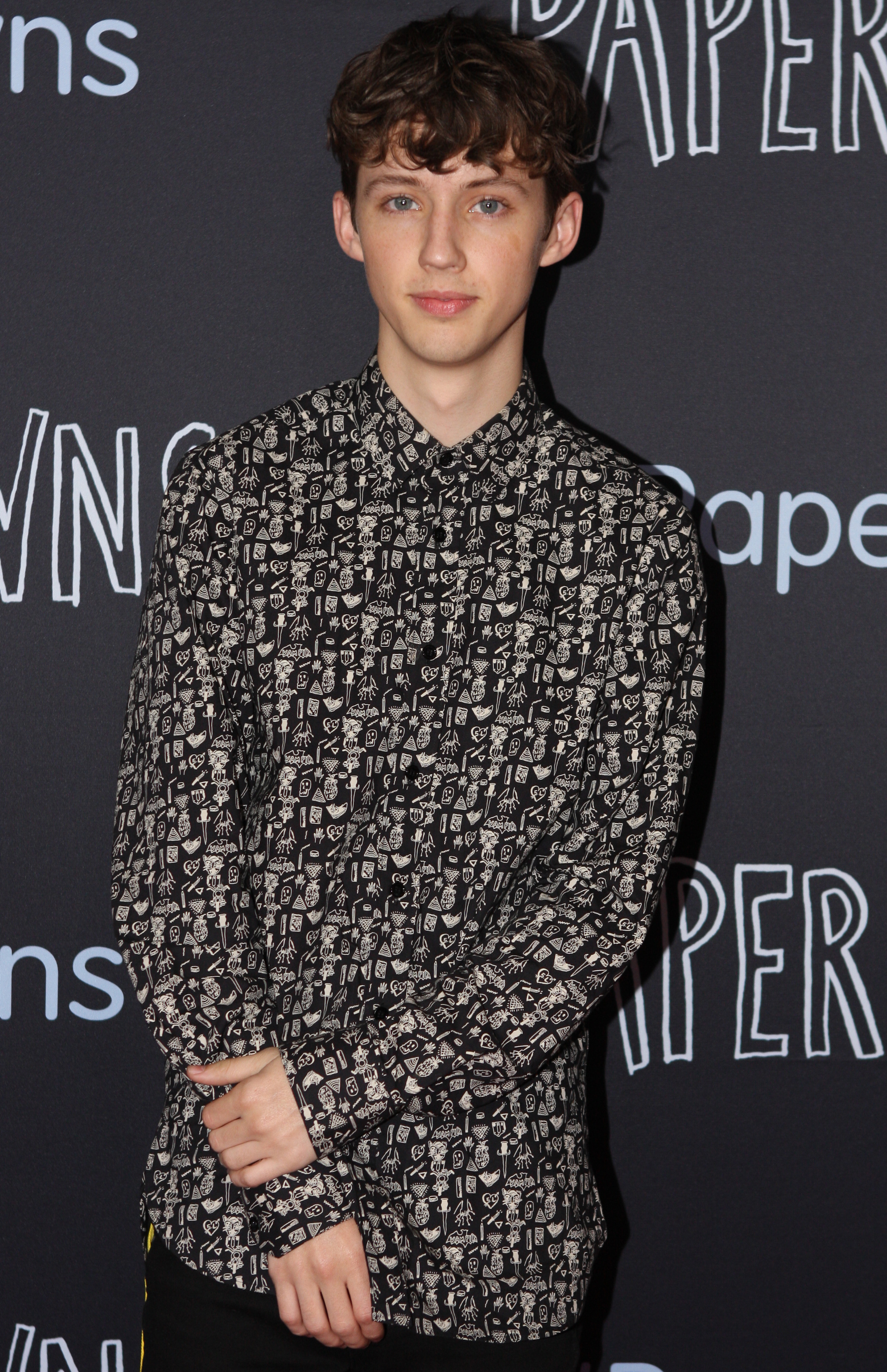
Sivan at the Australian premiere of Paper Towns in 2015

In 2007, Sivan starred as Oliver Twist in a production of Oliver! at the Regal Theatre. In 2008, Sivan was cast in a Western Australian short film, Betrand the Terrible. In February 2008, Sivan was cast as young James Howlett in X-Men Origins: Wolverine. Sivan got the part after videos of his telethon performance were posted on YouTube, catching the attention of a Hollywood agent who contacted Sivan and asked him to send in an audition tape. Though Kodi Smit-McPhee was already cast for this role, he was unable to be a part of the film, due to his commitment to The Road. In July 2009, he auditioned successfully for the lead role in Spud, a film adaptation of the 2005 novel by South African author John van de Ruit. Filming took place in South Africa from early March to mid-April 2010. The film was released in South Africa on 3 December 2010 and was later nominated for six SAFTAs, including a Best Lead Actor in a Feature Film nomination for Sivan.

Sivan appeared in the Western Australian season of Samuel Beckett's absurdist play Waiting for Godot which opened on 28 May 2010. Sivan shared the role of "Boy" with Craig Hyde-Smith, alternating nights. In June 2012, Sivan returned to South Africa to film Spud 2: The Madness Continues, which was released in South Africa on 21 June 2013. Sivan also starred in the third film in the series, Spud 3: Learning to Fly, released on 28 November 2014.

Sivan had a supporting role in the 2018 film Boy Erased. In 2022, he starred as Caleb, a 17-year-old exposed to HIV following a one-night fling on the eve of his high school graduation in the feature film Three Months, which explores the ongoing stigma that HIV-positive persons experience. On 22 November 2021, Sivan was cast as a series regular in the HBO drama series The Idol. The series was cancelled in August 2023 after a single season.

== Other ventures ==
=== YouTube ===
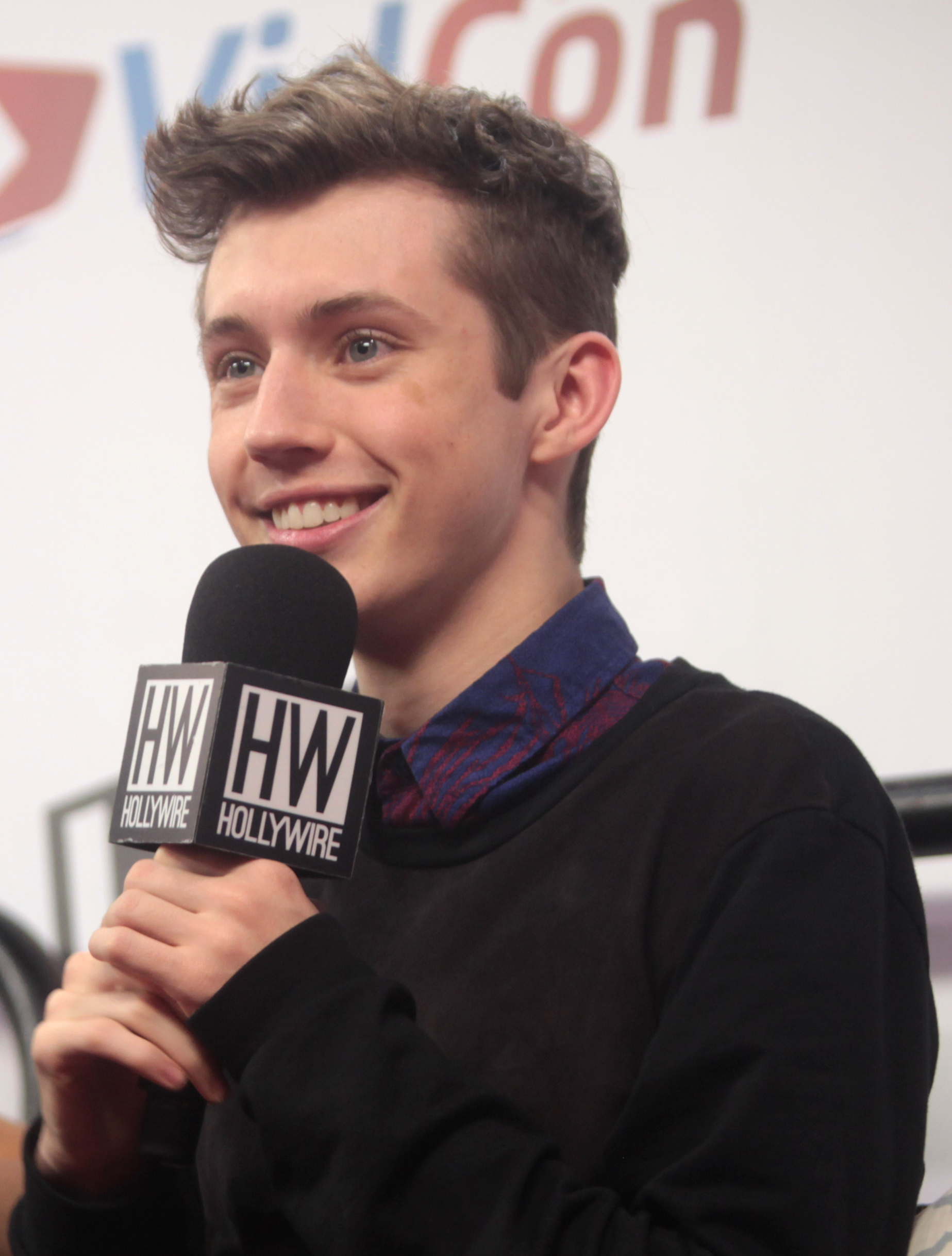
Sivan at VidCon in 2014

In September 2012, Sivan began creating vlogs on the video sharing site YouTube, after having only sung on the site since 2007. At the time of posting his first vlog, Sivan had accumulated 27,000 subscribers in his five years since joining YouTube on 1 October 2007. His first video was an a cappella cover of Declan Galbraith's "Tell Me Why". A YouTube video Sivan made with fellow YouTuber Tyler Oakley, titled "The 'Boyfriend' Tag", earned them a Teen Choice Award in the "Choice Web Collaboration" category. As of November 2023, Sivan had over 8.1 million subscribers and over 1.9 billion total views across his YouTube videos.

=== Endorsements ===
In 2018, Sivan was the face of Valentino's Spring/Summer 2018 collection. In 2019, he was a brand ambassador for MAC's Viva Glam campaign. He also appeared in Calvin Klein's #MyCalvins and #CK50 campaigns that year. Since 2020, he has been a Cartier ambassador. In February 2021, Sivan's capsule t-shirt collection that he designed with Uniqlo was released. On 24 September 2021, he was featured as a model in the third volume of Rihanna's Savage X Fenty Show. In early 2022, he was involved in Beyoncé's Ivy Park's campaign for her capsule collection with Adidas. He has been a brand ambassador for YSL Beauty since 2022. In 2024, Sivan was announced as a brand ambassador for Rabanne.

=== Tsu Lange Yor ===
Following the positive response to a 2021 Architectural Digest tour of his Melbourne home, Sivan sought to launch his own lifestyle brand. In July 2023, it was reported that he, in partnership with his brother Steele Mellet, would launch "an independent luxury lifestyle collection of fragrances and art-driven objects" called Tsu Lange Yor. The name is Yiddish for 'to long years', which comes from his growing up in a Jewish household. The brand focuses on a feeling of "home" and does not sell white-label products.

The brand launched in August 2023 at a pop-up store in Melbourne with household goods, candles and perfumes.

In July 2025, it was announced that Tsu Lange Yor products would receive American distribution by Nordstrom. Co-founder Steele Mellet noted that "[the] UK, Australia and the US are our three major markets". In collaboration with fashion designer Henry Zankov, the brand also expanded into textile products.

== Artistry ==
Sivan's favourite artists include Janet Jackson, Amy Winehouse, Taylor Swift and Lorde. He is also inspired by Michael Jackson and Frank Ocean. He told Wonderland in 2018, "When I think about the songs that I grew up listening to that made me feel ... gay, it was mostly straight women: Cher, Madonna, Miley, Robyn, Lady Gaga. Those are my gay icons, which is a bit strange. I would have loved to have had more queer music growing up. That would have been nice." Sivan also cites Ariana Grande and Christina Aguilera as his inspirations, as his music video for "My My My!" was directly influenced by the one for "Dirrty" (2002).

Sivan's music has been described as "layered electropop with constant tinges of EDM". His baritone voice has received widespread praise, and his work has been compared to that of Lorde and Taylor Swift. In December 2020, Sivan was listed at number 34 in Rolling Stone Australia's "50 Greatest Australian Artists of All Time" issue. Sivan's music is also often described as dance pop. Of his love of the genre, Sivan stated, "dance music is music that you really, really live life to, and it's OK to take your time and let things build and have the kind of restraint to create that tension."

=== Music videos ===
Sivan's music videos frequently feature gay relationships between the characters. Blue Neighbourhood's trilogy followed the narrative of two gay teenagers in a secret relationship while "Youth" featured Sivan with another male love interest. His music video for "Heaven" features footage of historical LGBTQ movements and couples, as well as sensual shots with him and an anonymous man with the running taglines "Without losing a piece of me, how do I get to Heaven?" and "If I'm losing a piece of me, maybe I don't want Heaven". Sivan has said that these portrayals are important to him, especially when he remembers "such vivid memories of the few times I saw any type of LGBTQ relationship on TV or in music videos".

On 16 July 2020, Sivan released a self-directed music video for his second song, "Easy", from his EP In a Dream. A remix of "Easy", featuring country singer-songwriter Kacey Musgraves and producer Mark Ronson, was released alongside a second music video in December 2020.

On 13 July 2023, Sivan released the music video for "Rush", the lead single for Something to Give Each Other, which received widespread acclaim for its unapologetic display of queer culture. The video garnered Sivan his first nomination for the Grammy Award for Best Music Video. Sivan received some criticism for a lack of body diversity among the dancers in the music video; in response, he said "it just wasn't a thought [he and creative director Gordon von Steiner] had."

== Personal life ==
Sivan came out publicly as gay via a YouTube video on 7 August 2013, three years after coming out to his family. He stated that he wanted the video to be out because he did not want his sexuality to be a secret from EMI Australia as he was in negotiations with them at the time for a record deal and had not yet discussed his sexuality with them. The morning after he posted his coming out video, he received a congratulatory email from EMI.

Sivan has a mild form of Marfan syndrome making him "super thin, with long bendy fingers, and a high palate" which he considers "weird". He has also suffered from body image issues. In an interview with Billboard, Sivan said "I think that everyone's body is as beautiful as it is, including my own, and it just sucks to see people talking about other people's bodies."

== Acting credits ==
=== Film ===
Year	Title	Role	Ref.
2009	X-Men Origins: Wolverine	Young James Howlett	
2010	Spud	John "Spud" Milton	
2011	Betrand the Terrible	Ace	
2013	Spud 2: The Madness Continues	John "Spud" Milton	
2014	Spud 3: Learning to Fly	John "Spud" Milton	
2018	Boy Erased	Gary	
2022	Three Months	Caleb	
2023	Trolls Band Together	Floyd (voice)	

=== Television ===
Year	Title	Role	Notes
2006–2008	Channel Seven Perth Telethon	Himself	Opening act
2007	Star Search	Himself	Finalist
2015	The Tonight Show Starring Jimmy Fallon	Himself	Musical guest
2016	The Ellen DeGeneres Show	Himself	Musical guest (season 14, episode 31)
2016	The Late Late Show with James Corden	Himself	Musical guest and interview
2016	The Tonight Show Starring Jimmy Fallon	Himself	Musical guest
2018	The Ellen DeGeneres Show	Himself	Musical guest and interview
2018	Saturday Night Live	Himself	Musical guest; episode: "Jessica Chastain / Troye Sivan"
2019	RuPaul's Drag Race	Himself	Guest judge (season 11, episode 3)
2019	The Kacey Musgraves Christmas Show	Himself	Musical guest
2021	RuPaul's Drag Race Down Under	Himself	Guest judge (season 1, episode 3)
2021	Savage X Fenty Show Vol. 3	Himself	Model
2023	The Idol	Xander	Supporting role

=== Theatre ===
Year	Title	Role	Notes
2007	Oliver!	Oliver Twist	Regal Theatre
2010	Waiting for Godot	Boy	His Majesty's Theatre

== Discography ==
- Blue Neighbourhood (2015)
- Bloom (2018)
- Something to Give Each Other (2023)
- She's the Best (2026)

== Tours ==
=== Headlining ===
- Troye Sivan Live (2015)
- Blue Neighbourhood Tour (2016)
- Suburbia Tour (2016)
- The Bloom Tour (2018–2019)
- Something to Give Each Other Tour (2024)

=== Co-headlining ===
- Sweat Tour (with Charli XCX; 2024)
