= Happy Little Pill =

Single by Troye Sivan

from the EP TRXYE
- Released: 25 July 2014
- Genre: Electropop
- Length: 3:44
- Label: EMI Australia
- Songwriters: Troye Sivan; Brandon Rogers; Tat Tong
- Producers: Tong; Alex JL Hiew; SLUMS

Troye Sivan singles chronology
"Happy Little Pill" (2014)	"Papercut" (2015)

Music video
- "Happy Little Pill" on YouTube

"Happy Little Pill" is the debut single by Australian singer-songwriter Troye Sivan. The song is the first single from TRXYE, his first extended play (EP) released by a major label. It was released digitally on 25 July 2014. The song was written by Troye Sivan, Brandon Rogers, and Tat Tong.

"Happy Little Pill" peaked at number 10 on the Australian ARIA Singles Chart. The single received critical acclaim for its mature sound.

== Background ==
Sivan said of the song, "It's about loneliness and the different ways that people cope with the things that are going on in their lives." He also stated: "I wrote this song during a bit of a rough time for someone super close to me, and for myself, and it still means as much to me as the day I wrote it."

== Music video ==
A music video to accompany the release of "Happy Little Pill" was posted by Troye Sivan, on his Vevo YouTube page. It was directed by Jeremy Koren.

== Critical reception ==
"Happy Little Pill" has garnered acclaim from contemporary music critics. Mike Wass from Idolator praised the song, and said: "'Happy Little Pill' is a surprisingly mature (and dark) pop anthem." Abby Abrams from TIME praised the lyrics and production of the song, and commented: "'Happy Little Pill' seems primed to move the teen into the big leagues, with melancholy lyrics and a downtempo electronic sound that give off a world-weary vibe." Platform called the single "an infectious and brooding synth-pop song which is sure to take over dancefloors across the world" and praised its "profound lyricism."

== Track listing ==
Standard edition
No.	Title	Writer(s)	Length
1.	"Happy Little Pill" (radio edit)	Troye Sivan; Brandon Rogers; Tat Tong	3:44

== Charts ==
=== Weekly charts ===
Chart (2014)	Peak position
Australia (ARIA)	10
Austria (Ö3 Austria Top 40)	47
Belgium (Ultratip Bubbling Under Flanders)	45
Czech Republic Airplay (ČNS IFPI)	45
Canada Hot 100 (Billboard)	50
Denmark (Tracklisten)	11
Finland Download (Latauslista)	1
Germany (GfK)	87
Ireland (IRMA)	11
Netherlands (Single Top 100)	85
New Zealand (Recorded Music NZ)	2
Scottish Singles Sales (Official Charts)	79
Slovakia Airplay (ČNS IFPI)	48
UK Singles (Official Charts)	86
US Billboard Hot 100	92

=== Year-end chart ===
Chart (2014)	Position
Australian Artist Singles (ARIA)	26

== Certifications ==
Region	Certification	Certified units/sales
Australia (ARIA)	Platinum	70,000^{‡}
New Zealand (RMNZ)	Gold	7,500^{*}
^{*} Sales figures based on certification alone.^{‡} Sales+streaming figures based on certification alone.

== Release history ==
Region	Date	Format	Label
Australia	25 July 2014	Digital download	EMI Australia
