= Youth (Troye Sivan song) =

Single by Troye Sivan

from the album Blue Neighbourhood
- Released: 13 November 2015
- Length: 3:05
- Label: EMI Australia; Capitol; Universal
- Songwriters: Troye Sivan; Bram Inscore; Brett McLaughlin; Alexandra Hughes; Alex Hope
- Producers: Bram Inscore; Alex JL Hiew; Slums

Troye Sivan singles chronology
"Wild" (2015)	"Youth" (2015)	"Talk Me Down" (2016)

Music video
- "Youth" on YouTube

"Youth" (stylised in all caps) is a song by Australian singer-songwriter Troye Sivan from his debut studio album Blue Neighbourhood (2015). It was written by Sivan, Bram Inscore, Brett McLaughlin (Leland), Alex Hope and Allie X, and produced by Bram Inscore, Slums and Alex JL Hiew. The song premiered on 12 November 2015 on Shazam Top 20 at 7PM AEST and was officially released on 13 November 2015 as the album's second single.

"Youth" won Sivan's first ever Australian Recording Industry Association (ARIA) Awards in 2016 for Best Video and Song of the Year. Billboard ranked "Youth" at number 11 on their "100 Best Pop Songs of 2016" list.

== Background ==
Sivan said "'Youth' is a song about the joy in naivety and being lost. It's about dropping everything, running away, making mistakes, and loving too hard, and how that's okay. "

== Music video ==
A lyric video was released on 23 November 2015. The video was directed and produced by Scheme Engine and filmed in both Los Angeles and Seattle. Sivan filmed a music video for "Youth" in early February 2016. Later that month, the music video, directed by Malia James, premiered on his Vevo channel on YouTube. Amandla Stenberg and Lia Marie Johnson appear in the video.

== Charts ==
=== Weekly charts ===
Chart (2015–2016)	Peak position
Australia (ARIA)	17
Austria (Ö3 Austria Top 40)	73
Belgium (Ultratop 50 Flanders)	32
Belgium (Ultratip Bubbling Under Wallonia)	28
Canada Hot 100 (Billboard)	47
Canada CHR/Top 40 (Billboard)	38
Czech Republic Airplay (ČNS IFPI)	46
Czech Republic Singles Digital (ČNS IFPI)	24
Germany (GfK)	22
Hungary (Stream Top 40)	30
Ireland (IRMA)	62
Italy (FIMI)	72
Latvia (Latvijas Top 40)	11
Netherlands (Single Top 100)	78
New Zealand (Recorded Music NZ)	23
Portugal (AFP)	40
Slovakia Airplay (ČNS IFPI)	70
Slovakia Singles Digital (ČNS IFPI)	27
South Korea (Gaon)	54
Sweden (Sverigetopplistan)	74
Switzerland (Schweizer Hitparade)	56
UK Singles (Official Charts)	96
US Billboard Hot 100	23
US Dance Club Songs (Billboard)	1
US Pop Airplay (Billboard)	18

=== Year-end charts ===
Chart (2016)	Position
Australia (ARIA)	91
US Dance Club Songs (Billboard)	21
Chart (2019)	Position
South Korea (Gaon)	110

== Certifications ==
Region	Certification	Certified units/sales
Australia (ARIA)	4× Platinum	280,000^{‡}
Brazil (Pro-Música Brasil)	Platinum	60,000^{‡}
Denmark (IFPI Danmark)	Gold	45,000^{‡}
Germany (BVMI)	Gold	200,000^{‡}
Italy (FIMI)	Gold	25,000^{‡}
New Zealand (RMNZ)	2× Platinum	60,000^{‡}
South Korea	—	2,500,000
Sweden (GLF)	Platinum	40,000^{‡}
United Kingdom (BPI)	Gold	400,000^{‡}
United States (RIAA)	2× Platinum	2,000,000^{‡}
^{‡} Sales+streaming figures based on certification alone.

== Release history ==
Country	Date	Format	Label
Worldwide	13 November 2015	Digital download	Universal Music Australia
Italy	11 December 2015	Mainstream radio	Universal
United States	19 January 2016	Mainstream radio	Capitol
United States	4 April 2016	Hot/Modern/AC	Capitol

== See also ==
- List of number-one dance singles of 2016 (U.S.)
