= Peter Thomas (musician) =

American singer, songwriter and record producer

- Also known as: Peter Thomas Walsh
- Genres: Pop; R&B; Dance; Indie pop; K-pop
- Occupations: Singer; songwriter; record producer; multi instrumentalist
- Years active: 2012–present

Peter Thomas Walsh is an American singer, songwriter, and record producer. Based in Los Angeles, California, he has worked with a range of popular artists, including Selena Gomez, Pink, and Sheppard. He is also known as the main collaborator of the singer-songwriter, Betty Who. He has written and produced hit songs including "Walk Me Home" by Pink, "Sparks" by Hilary Duff, and "Somebody Loves You" by Betty Who. In 2018, he launched his career as a singer, releasing Carly Rae Jepsen cover, "Run Away with Me" with his fellow singer-songwriter Leland.

== Personal life ==
Thomas is currently based in Los Angeles, California. He is openly gay.

== Discography ==
=== As lead artist ===
==== Studio albums ====
| Title | Details |
|---|---|
| Attachment | Released: February 7, 2020; Label: Self-released; Format: digital download, streaming |
| Let It All Happen | Released: March 12, 2021; Label: Self-released; Format: digital download, streaming |

==== Extended plays ====
| Title | Details |
|---|---|
| Unfinished | Released: February 5, 2021; Label: Self-released; Format: digital download, streaming |

==== Singles ====
| Title | Year | Album |
|---|---|---|
| "All of You" (with Betty Who) | 2013 | Take Me When You Go |
| "Run Away with Me" (with Leland) | 2018 | Attachment |
| "Watching TV with the Sound off" | 2019 | Attachment |
| "Look at What We've Done" | 2019 | Attachment |
| "If You're Happy Now" | 2019 | Attachment |
| "View" | 2019 | Attachment |
| "No One" (with Gnash) | 2020 | Unfinished and Let It All Happen |
| "Werewolf" | 2020 | Unfinished and Let It All Happen |
| "Cycles" | 2020 | Unfinished and Let It All Happen |

=== Music videos ===
List of music videos, showing year released and directors
| Title | Year | Director(s) | Ref. |
|---|---|---|---|
| "Watching TV with the Sound off" | 2019 | Joe DeSantis | |
| "Look at What We've Done" | 2019 | Joe DeSantis | |
| "If You're Happy Now" | 2019 | Joe DeSantis | |
| "View" | 2019 | Joe DeSantis | |
| "If You're Happy Now" (Sleep Mix) | 2019 | Joe DeSantis | |

== Songwriting and production credits ==
indicates a song that was released as a single.

| Title | Year | Artist(s) | Chart performance | | | | | | | | | | Album | Credits |
| Title | Year | Artist(s) | US | AUS | BEL (FL) | CAN | GER | NZ | SWE | UK | US Dance | US Elec. | Album | Credits |
|---|---|---|---|---|---|---|---|---|---|---|---|---|---|---|
| "Eighteen Cool" | 2012 | Hoodie Allen | — | — | — | — | — | — | — | — | — | — | All American | Writer |
| "Small Town" | 2012 | Hoodie Allen | — | — | — | — | — | — | — | — | — | — | All American | Writer |
| "Fire with Fire" | 2012 | Betty Who | — | — | — | — | — | — | — | — | — | — | Non-album singles | Producer, Writer |
| "Somebody Loves You" | 2012 | Betty Who | 116 | — | — | — | — | — | — | — | 1 | — | The Movement and Take Me When You Go | Producer, Writer |
| "You're in Love" | 2013 | Betty Who | — | — | — | — | — | — | — | — | — | — | The Movement and Take Me When You Go | Producer, Writer |
| "High Society" | 2013 | Betty Who | — | — | — | — | — | — | — | — | — | — | The Movement and Take Me When You Go | Producer, Writer |
| "Right Here" | 2013 | Betty Who | — | — | — | — | — | — | — | — | — | — | The Movement and Take Me When You Go | Producer |
| "Baciami e basta" | 2013 | Elhaida Dani | — | — | — | — | — | — | — | — | — | — | Elhaida Dani | Producer, Writer |
| "Like a Champion" | 2013 | Selena Gomez | — | — | — | — | — | — | — | — | — | — | Stars Dance | Producer, Writer |
| "Gold" | 2013 | Victoria Justice | — | — | — | — | — | — | — | — | — | — | Non-album singles | Writer |
| "Heartbreak Dream" | 2014 | Betty Who | — | — | — | — | — | — | — | — | — | — | Slow Dancing and Take Me When You Go | Producer, Writer |
| "Alone Again" | 2014 | Betty Who | — | — | — | — | — | — | — | — | — | — | Slow Dancing and Take Me When You Go | Producer, Writer |
| "Giving Me Away" | 2014 | Betty Who | — | — | — | — | — | — | — | — | — | — | Slow Dancing and Take Me When You Go | Producer, Writer |
| "Lovin' Start" | 2014 | Betty Who | — | — | — | — | — | — | — | — | — | — | Slow Dancing and Take Me When You Go | Producer, Writer |
| "Silas" | 2014 | Betty Who | — | — | — | — | — | — | — | — | — | — | Slow Dancing and Take Me When You Go | Producer |
| "Catch My Vibe" | 2014 | Academy | — | — | — | — | — | — | — | — | — | — | Non-album singles | Producer, Writer |
| "Salt" (Peter Thomas Remix) | 2014 | Bad Suns | — | — | — | — | — | — | — | — | — | — | Transpose | Remix |
| "All of You" | 2014 | Betty Who | — | — | — | — | — | — | — | — | 1 | — | Take Me When You Go | Producer, Writer |
| "Just Like Me" | 2014 | Betty Who | — | — | — | — | — | — | — | — | — | — | Take Me When You Go | Producer, Writer |
| "Glory Days" | 2014 | Betty Who | — | — | — | — | — | — | — | — | — | — | Take Me When You Go | Producer, Writer |
| "Missing You" | 2014 | Betty Who | — | — | — | — | — | — | — | — | — | — | Take Me When You Go | Producer, Writer |
| "Runaways" | 2014 | Betty Who | — | — | — | — | — | — | — | — | — | — | Take Me When You Go | Producer, Writer |
| "California Rain" | 2014 | Betty Who | — | — | — | — | — | — | — | — | — | — | Take Me When You Go | Producer, Writer |
| "A Night to Remember" | 2014 | Betty Who | — | — | — | — | — | — | — | — | — | — | Take Me When You Go | Producer |
| "Sparks" | 2015 | Hilary Duff | 93 | 104 | — | 63 | — | — | — | — | 6 | — | Breathe In. Breathe Out. | Producer, Writer |
| "All Over" (Peter Thomas Remix) | 2015 | CRUISR | — | — | — | — | — | — | — | — | — | — | CRUISR | Remix |
| "Panoramic" (featuring Jackson Breit) | 2016 | Academy | — | — | — | — | — | — | — | — | — | — | Non-album singles | Writer |
| "Talk Too Much" | 2016 | COIN | — (Note: "Talk Too Much" did not enter the Billboard Hot 100, but did peak at number 8 on the Alternative Songs chart as well as charting on the Rock Airplay and Hot Rock Songs charts at numbers 16 and 28, respectively.) | — | — (Note: "Talk Too Much" did not enter the Canadian Hot 100, but did peak at number 38 on the Hot Canadian rock songs chart.) | — | — | — | — | — | — | — | How Will You Know If You Never Try | Writer |
| "I Love You Always Forever" | 2016 | Betty Who | — | 6 | — | — | — | 33 | — | — | 1 | — | The Valley | Producer |
| "Sweet Talk" | 2016 | Scavenger Hunt | — | — | — | — | — | — | — | — | — | — | Shapes and Outlines | Producer, Writer |
| "Human Touch" | 2016 | Betty Who | — | — | — | — | — | — | — | — | — | — | The Valley | Producer, Writer |
| "Phase Me Out" | 2017 | Vérité | — | — | — | — | — | — | — | — | — | — | Somewhere in Between | Writer |
| "You Can Cry Tomorrow" | 2017 | Betty Who | — | — | — | — | — | — | — | — | — | — | The Valley | Producer, Writer |
| "Mama Say" | 2017 | Betty Who | — | — | — | — | — | — | — | — | — | — | The Valley | Producer, Writer |
| "Wanna Be" | 2017 | Betty Who | — | — | — | — | — | — | — | — | — | — | The Valley | Producer, Writer |
| "Pretending You're Missing Me" | 2017 | Betty Who | — | — | — | — | — | — | — | — | — | — | The Valley | Producer, Writer |
| "Make You Memories" | 2017 | Betty Who | — | — | — | — | — | — | — | — | — | — | The Valley | Producer, Writer |
| "Reunion" | 2017 | Betty Who | — | — | — | — | — | — | — | — | — | — | The Valley | Producer, Writer |
| "Free to Fly" (featuring Warren G) | 2017 | Betty Who | — | — | — | — | — | — | — | — | — | — | The Valley | Producer |
| "Keep Me Crazy" | 2017 | Sheppard | — | 37 | 26 | — | — | — (Note: "Keep Me Crazy" did not enter the Official New Zealand Music Chart, but peaked at number 8 on the New Zealand Heatseekers chart.) | — | — | — | — | Watching the Sky | Producer, Writer |
| "Stay the Night" | 2017 | Jukebox the Ghost | — | — | — | — | — | — | — | — | — | — | Non-album singles | Producer, Writer |
| "Bout You" | 2017 | Vérité | — | — | — | — | — | — | — | — | — | — | Somewhere in Between | Producer |
| "Edge of the Night" | 2017 | Sheppard | — | 142 | — | — | — | — | — | — | — | — | Watching the Sky | Producer, Writer |
| "Where the Love Goes" (featuring Oskar Flood) | 2017 | Anjulie | — | — | — | — | — | — | — | — | — | — | Non-album singles | Writer |
| "The Outfield" | 2017 | The Night Game | — | — | — | — | — | — | — | — | — | — | The Night Game | Writer |
| "Johnny Cash" (featuring Scavenger Hunt) | 2017 | RAC | — | — | — | — | — | — | — | — | — | — | Ego | Writer |
| "Staring at the Sun" | 2017 | TOTEM | — | — | — | — | — | — | — | — | — | — | Non-album singles | Writer |
| "Cameo" | 2017 | Sam Tsui | — | — | — | — | — | — | — | — | — | — | Trust | Producer |
| "A Million Pieces" | 2018 | Sam Tsui | — | — | — | — | — | — | — | — | — | — | Trust | Producer |
| "Running In the Dark" | 2018 | Anton Hagman | — | — | — | — | — | — | — | — | — | — | Non-album singles | Producer, Writer |
| "Everybody's Lonely" | 2018 | Jukebox the Ghost | — (Note: "Everybody's Lonely" did not enter the Billboard Hot 100, but did peak at number 22 on the Alternative Songs chart as well as charting on the Rock Airplay chart at number 26.) | — | — | — | — | — | — | — | — | — | Off to the Races | Producer, Writer |
| "Ignore Me" | 2018 | Betty Who | — | — | — | — | — | — | — | — | — | — | Betty, Pt. 1 and Betty | Producer, Writer |
| "Just Thought You Should Know" | 2018 | Betty Who | — | — | — | — | — | — | — | — | — | — | Betty, Pt. 1 and Betty | Producer, Writer |
| "Emotion" | 2018 | Vindata & R.LUM.R | — | — | — | — | — | — | — | — | — | — | Non-album singles | Writer |
| "All Things" (from "Queer Eye") | 2018 | Betty Who | — | — | — | — | — | — | — | — | — | — | Non-album singles | Producer |
| "Remember Me" | 2018 | Vincint | — | — | — | — | — | — | — | — | — | — | Non-album singles | Producer, Writer |
| "Next Summer" | 2018 | Sophie Elise | — | — | — | — | — | — | — | — | — | — | Non-album singles | Producer, Writer |
| "Between You & Me" | 2018 | Betty Who | — | — | — | — | — | — | — | — | — | — | Betty | Producer, Writer |
| "Cemetery" | 2018 | COIN | — | — | — | — | — | — | — | — | — | — | Dreamland | Writer |
| "American Spirit" | 2019 | Washington | — | — | — | — | — | — | — | — | — | — | Non-album singles | Producer, Writer |
| "I Remember" | 2019 | Betty Who | — | — | — | — | — | — | — | — | — | — | Betty | Producer, Writer |
| "Old Me" | 2019 | Betty Who | — | — | — | — | — | — | — | — | — | — | Betty | Producer, Writer |
| "The One" | 2019 | Betty Who | — | — | — | — | — | — | — | — | — | — | Betty | Producer, Writer |
| "Marry Me" | 2019 | Betty Who | — | — | — | — | — | — | — | — | — | — | Betty | Producer |
| "Language" | 2019 | Betty Who | — | — | — | — | — | — | — | — | — | — | Betty | Producer |
| "Whisper" | 2019 | Betty Who | — | — | — | — | — | — | — | — | — | — | Betty | Producer |
| "Stop Thinking About You" | 2019 | Betty Who | — | — | — | — | — | — | — | — | — | — | Betty | Producer |
| "Walk Me Home" | 2019 | Pink | 49 | 11 | 15 | 17 | 33 | 16 | 35 | 8 | 1 | — | Hurts 2B Human | Producer |
| "Anxiety" | 2019 | Anna Clendening | — | — | — | — | — | — | — | — | — | — | Waves | Producer |
| "Freak Show" | 2019 | Ingrid Michaelson | — | — | — | — | — | — | — | — | — | — | Stranger Songs | Producer, Writer |
| "Blood, Sweat & Tears" | 2019 | Ava Max | — | — | — | — | — | — | — | — | — | — | Non-album singles | Writer |
| "Magic Island" | 2019 | TXT | — | — | — | — | — | — | — | — | — | — | The Dream Chapter: Magic | Producer, Writer |
| "Don't Do Me Like That" | 2020 | Transviolet | — | — | — | — | — | — | — | — | — | — | Born to Rule | Producer, Writer |
| "Outta State" | 2020 | Academy | — | — | — | — | — | — | — | — | — | — | The Beat Generation | Producer, Writer |
| "Boys with Emotions" | 2020 | Felix Sandman | — | — | — | — | — | — | 16 | — | — | — | Melodifestivalen 2020 | Writer |
| "Say It First" | 2020 | B-OK & Michela | — | — | — | — | — | — | — | — | — | — | TBA | Writer |
| "You Can't Fix Me" | 2020 | Yoste | — | — | — | — | — | — | — | — | — | — | A Few Brief Moments | Producer, Writer |
| "Don't Believe in Love" | 2020 | Sheppard | — | — | — | — | — | — | — | — | — | — | Kaleidoscope Eyes | Producer, Writer |
| "City" | 2020 | Zachary Knowles | — | — | — | — | — | — | — | — | — | — | TBA | Producer, Writer |
| "Forever After" | 2020 | Academy | — | — | — | — | — | — | — | — | — | — | TBA | Producer, Writer |
| "Oops (I'm Sorry)" (featuring Gashi and Ty Dolla Sign) | 2020 | Lost Kings | — | — | — | — | — | — | — | — | — | 21 | TBA | Writer |
| "Problems" | 2020 | Anne-Marie | — | — | — | — | — | — | — | — | — | — | Non-album singles | Producer |
| "Don't Remind Me" | 2020 | Academy | — | — | — | — | — | — | — | — | — | — | TBA | Producer, Writer |
| "Fake a Smile" | 2021 | Alan Walker & Salem Ilese | — | — | — | — | — | — | 23 | — | — | — | TBA | Writer |
| "Grape Swisher" | 2021 | Goody Grace | — | — | — | — | — | — | — | — | — | — | Don't Forget Where You Came from | Writer |
| "Gucci Knife" (featuring MASN) | 2021 | Carlie Hanson | — | — | — | — | — | — | — | — | — | — | TBA | Writer, producer |
| "Friendship Street" | 2021 | Academy | — | — | — | — | — | — | — | — | — | — | TBA | Writer, producer |
| "Infinity" | 2021 | Fancy Hagood | — | — | — | — | — | — | — | — | — | — | Love, Victor: Season 2 (Original Soundtrack) | Writer |
| "Horizontal" | 2021 | Alice Longyu Gao | — | — | — | — | — | — | — | — | — | — | Love, Victor: Season 2 (Original Soundtrack) | Writer, producer |
| "Private Life" | 2021 | Allie X | — | — | — | — | — | — | — | — | — | — | Love, Victor: Season 2 (Original Soundtrack) | Writer, producer |
| "Heaven Is A Hand To Hold" | 2021 | Duncan Laurence | — | — | — | — | — | — | — | — | — | — | Love, Victor: Season 2 (Original Soundtrack) | Writer, producer |
| "No More Friends" (featuring Oliver Sykes) | 2021 | Olivia O'Brien | — | — | — | — | — | — | — | — | — | — | Episodes | Writer, producer |
| "Bitter" | 2021 | Wraya | — | — | — | — | — | — | — | — | — | — | TBA | Writer |
| "Trust Issues" | 2021 | Wraya | — | — | — | — | — | — | — | — | — | — | TBA | Writer |
| "Sober" | 2021 | Pretty Sister | — | — | — | — | — | — | — | — | — | — | Catalina | Writer |
| "Dark Times" | 2021 | Ben Platt | — | — | — | — | — | — | — | — | — | — | Reverie | Additional producer |
| "Indiana" | 2021 | Academy | — | — | — | — | — | — | — | — | — | — | TBA | Producer, Writer |
| "Ghost" | 2021 | Wraya | — | — | — | — | — | — | — | — | — | — | TBA | Producer |
| "Panic" | 2021 | Academy | — | — | — | — | — | — | — | — | — | — | TBA | Producer, Writer |
| "On and On" | 2022 | Restless Modern | — | — | — | — | — | — | — | — | — | — | A Likeness Complicit | Producer |
| "Girls In Line For The Bathroom" | 2022 | Carlie Hanson | — | — | — | — | — | — | — | — | — | — | Tough Boy | Writer |
| "Fake Smile" | 2022 | Carlie Hanson | — | — | — | — | — | — | — | — | — | — | Tough Boy | Producer, Writer |
| "I Hate That I'm Addicted to the Internet" | 2022 | Restless Modern | — | — | — | — | — | — | — | — | — | — | A Likeness Complicit | Producer |
| "Cold Charlie" | 2022 | CARR | — | — | — | — | — | — | — | — | — | — | TV Boyfriends | Producer, writer |
| "Mission" | 2022 | Vincint | — | — | — | — | — | — | — | — | — | — | Love, Victor: Season 3 (Original Soundtrack) | Writer |
| "Dinner" | 2022 | Grag Queen | — | — | — | — | — | — | — | — | — | — | Love, Victor: Season 3 (Original Soundtrack) | Writer |
| "Blender" | 2022 | 5 Seconds of Summer | — | — | — | — | — | — (Note: "Blender" did not enter the Official New Zealand Music Chart, but peaked at number 23 on the New Zealand Heatseekers chart.) | — | — | — | — | 5SOS5 | Producer, writer |

== Awards and nominations ==
| Year | Organization | Work | Category | Result | Ref. |
|---|---|---|---|---|---|
| 2020 | Global Awards | "Walk Me Home" | Best Song | Nominated | |
