= Party in the Valley Tour =

2017–18 concert tour by Betty Who

- Tour by Betty Who
- Promotional poster for the tour
- Associated album: The Valley
- Start date: 12 April 2017
- End date: 31 March 2018
- Legs: 3
- No. of shows: 58 in North America

Betty Who concert chronology
- The Convertible Nights Tour (2015); Party in the Valley Tour (2017); Betty: The Tour (2019)

The Party in the Valley Tour was the second concert tour by Australian recording artist Betty Who. The tour supported her second studio album The Valley (2017). The tour began on 12 April 2017, in New Haven, Connecticut and ended on 31 March 2018, in St. Petersburg, Florida.

== Set list ==
This set list is representative of the show on 15 April 2017. It does not represent all dates throughout the tour.

1. "The Valley"
2. "Glory Days"
3. "You Can Cry Tomorrow"
4. "Human Touch"
5. "Make You Memories"
6. "Pretend You're Missing Me"
7. "Heartbreak Dream"
8. "Free to Fly"
9. "Blue Heaven Midnight Crush"
10. "Beautiful"
11. "California Rain"
12. "Wanna Be"
13. "Some Kinda Wonderful"
14. "Just Like Me"
15. "All of You"
16. "Mama Say"
17. "High Society"

Encore

18. "I Love You Always Forever"
19. "Somebody Loves You"

== Shows ==
List of concerts, showing date, city, country, venue, and opening act
Date	City	Country	Venue	Opening Acts
North America
12 April 2017	New Haven	United States	The Ballroom at The Space	Vérité
14 April 2017	New York City	United States	Webster Hall	Vérité
15 April 2017	Boston	United States	Paradise Rock Club	Vérité
16 April 2017	Washington, D.C.	United States	9:30 Club	Vérité
17 April 2017	Philadelphia	United States	Union Transfer	Vérité
19 April 2017	Pittsburgh	United States	Rex Theater	Vérité
20 April 2017	Chicago	United States	Concord Music Hall	Vérité
22 April 2017	Minneapolis	United States	Triple Rock Social Club	Vérité
23 April 2017	Denver	United States	Bluebird Theater	Vérité
24 April 2017	Salt Lake City	United States	Urban Lounge	Vérité
26 April 2017	Seattle	United States	Neumos	Vérité
27 April 2017	Vancouver	Canada	Imperial	Vérité
28 April 2017	Portland	United States	Wonder Ballroom	Vérité
30 April 2017	Sacramento	United States	Harlows	Vérité
2 May 2017	Los Angeles	United States	The Fonda Theatre	Vérité
10 July 2017	Santa Barbara	United States	Soho Music Club	Geographer
11 July 2017	San Diego	United States	The Observatory North Park	Geographer
12 July 2017	Santa Ana	United States	The Observatory OC	Geographer
14 July 2017	Phoenix	United States	Crescent Ballroom	Geographer
15 July 2017	El Paso	United States	Lowbrow Palace	Geographer
17 July 2017	Dallas	United States	Trees	Geographer
18 July 2017	Austin	United States	Vulcan Gas Company	Geographer
19 July 2017	Houston	United States	White Oak Music Hall	Geographer
21 July 2017	New Orleans	United States	Republic New Orleans	Geographer
22 July 2017	Birmingham	United States	Saturn	Geographer
23 July 2017	Atlanta	United States	Terminal West	Geographer
25 July 2017	Nashville	United States	Exit / In	Geographer
26 July 2017	St. Louis	United States	The Ready Room	Geographer
27 July 2017	Madison	United States	Majestic Theater	Geographer
28 July 2017	Indianapolis	United States	The Hi / Fi	Geographer
30 July 2017	Cincinnati	United States	The Woodward Theater	Geographer
31 July 2017	Detroit	United States	The Magic Stick	Geographer
1 August 2017	Cleveland	United States	Beachland Ballroom	Geographer
3 August 2017	Toronto	Canada	The Mod Club	Geographer
4 August 2017	Montreal	Canada	La Salsa Rossa	Geographer
6 August 2017	Brooklyn	United States	Brooklyn Steel	Geographer
24 February 2018	Los Angeles	United States	The Wiltern	Spencer Ludwig and Pretty Sister
25 February 2018	San Jose	United States	The Ritz	Spencer Ludwig and Pretty Sister
27 February 2018	Portland	United States	Wonder Ballroom	Spencer Ludwig and Pretty Sister
28 February 2018	Vancouver	Canada	Imperial	Spencer Ludwig and Pretty Sister
2 March 2018	Salt Lake City	United States	The Complex	Spencer Ludwig and Pretty Sister
3 March 2018	Denver	United States	The Gothic Theater	Spencer Ludwig and Pretty Sister
5 March 2018	Minneapolis	United States	The Fine Line	Spencer Ludwig and Pretty Sister
6 March 2018	Milwaukee	United States	Turner Hall	Spencer Ludwig and Pretty Sister
8 March 2018	Chicago	United States	The Metro	Spencer Ludwig and Pretty Sister
10 March 2018	Columbus	United States	Skully's Music Diner	Spencer Ludwig and Pretty Sister
12 March 2018	Ferndale	United States	Loving Touch	Spencer Ludwig and Pretty Sister
13 March 2018	Toronto	Canada	Phoenix Concert Hall	Spencer Ludwig and Pretty Sister
15 March 2018	Boston	United States	Paradise	Spencer Ludwig and Pretty Sister
16 March 2018	Allston	United States	Brighton Music Hall	Spencer Ludwig and Pretty Sister
18 March 2018	Asbury Park	United States	The Stone Pony	Spencer Ludwig and Pretty Sister
21 March 2018	Washington, D.C.	United States	9:30 Club	Spencer Ludwig and Pretty Sister
23 March 2018	Richmond	United States	The National	Spencer Ludwig and Pretty Sister
24 March 2018	Asheville	United States	The Orange Peel	Spencer Ludwig and Pretty Sister
25 March 2018	Atlanta	United States	Terminal West	Spencer Ludwig and Pretty Sister
27 March 2018	Raleigh	United States	Lincoln Theater	Spencer Ludwig and Pretty Sister
29 March 2018	Orlando	United States	The Social	Spencer Ludwig and Pretty Sister
30 March 2018	Ft. Lauderdale	United States	Culture Room	Spencer Ludwig and Pretty Sister
31 March 2018	St. Petersburg	United States	State Theater	Spencer Ludwig and Pretty Sister
