= Between You & Me (Betty Who song) =

Single by Betty Who

from the album Betty
- Released: 14 November 2018
- Genre: Acoustic pop
- Length: 3:15
- Label: AWAL
- Songwriter(s): Betty Who; JHart; Pretty Sister; Peter Thomas
- Producer(s): Thomas

Betty Who singles chronology
"The Other Side" (2018)	"Between You & Me" (2018)	"I Remember" (2019)

"Between You & Me" is a song by Australian singer-songwriter Betty Who, from her third studio album, Betty (2019). The song was released as the album's third single on 14 November 2018. Who co-wrote the song with JHart, Pretty Sister and Peter Thomas Walsh, the lattermost of whom produced the track. A musical departure from Who's typically upbeat, synth-driven material, "Between You & Me" is an acoustic pop song featuring minimal production and prominent guitar instrumentation throughout; its confessional lyrics describe seeking romance from a friend whose feelings and intentions are unclear.

Who co-wrote the song based on personal experience with past relationships in which she questioned her own feelings, finding this theme relatable to both listeners and her co-writers. The product of an initially unsuccessful writing session, the songwriters stopped writing "Between You & Me" midway because Who was dissatisfied with its electronic direction. The songwriters eventually revisited the song after re-arranging it using only a guitar, ultimately completing the track six months later.

Who opted to release "Between You & Me" as the album's first single over a more upbeat track that had also been considered because it reminds her of her early songwriting career. One of her first singles as an independent artist since departing from RCA Records, Who considers the song's release an expression of her creative freedom. "Between You & Me" has garnered acclaim from music critics, who praised its acoustic production and Who's songwriting. An accompanying music video was released in November 2018, in which Who plays both characters exploring a same-sex relationship.

== Background and writing ==
"Between You & Me" was written by Jessica Newham (Betty Who) with James Abrahart (JHart), Zakariah Stucchi (Pretty Sister) and Peter Thomas Walsh. Thomas Walsh also produced the track. According to Who, "Between You & Me" resulted from an initially unsuccessful session during which they had stopped writing the song midway because the singer was dissatisfied with its electronic direction, asking that they revisit it at a later time. Who and JHart then brainstormed new approaches to the song outside of the studio and proceeded to re-write it using only a guitar. Who explained that this method "completely changed the vibe from what we had been working on earlier", which was "a little bit lifeless ... I wanted to do something that felt different, that feels really meaningful." Who greatly preferred the new acoustic arrangement.

The songwriters did not complete the song until six months later when Who re-discovered it. The singer drew inspiration from personal experience having feelings for others while questioning whether they are legitimate, or if she should express them. Who recalls several "instances in my life where you wish that you could have this really candid conversation with the person you have feelings for but it just goes unsaid", and found this experience to be universal among her co-writers, with whom she discussed how often people must feel similarly. Who believes this experience has grown more common in modern times because of social media, explaining that "human interaction and confrontation has gotten" more difficult.

Revealing that the track makes her feel emotional, the singer identified "Between You & Me" as an ode to how she began writing music originally, recalling a time when she was 14 years-old and using solely a guitar or piano to write about her feelings. Admitting that the song's "soft and demure" nature was a conscious decision to a certain extent, Who explained that she intended "to switch things up" and "emphasize the fact that I just wanna write songs". Who claims its lyrics are "one of my favorite stories I’ve ever told,” expounding, "It feels so good to finally have it out in the world instead of banging around my own brain." Thematically, Who drew similarities between the song and "Just Thought You Should Know", another track written for her then-forthcoming album. A fan of the television series Parks and Recreation, Who also believes the song serves as a suitable anthem for characters Leslie Knope (Amy Poehler) and Ben Wyatt (Adam Scott) before they became a couple.

== Release ==
"Between You & Me" was released on 14 November 2018 by AWAL Recordings, as the lead single from Who's third studio album Betty. It was distributed to several online music services, including Spotify, Apple Music, iTunes, Google Play, Deezer and Tidal. "Between You & Me" was one of Who's first singles as an independent artist following her departure from RCA Records after the release of her second album The Valley (2017). Who chose the song as the album's first single because it reminds her of her early years as a burgeoning singer-songwriter. Who and the album's producers had considered releasing a different song as the lead single but opted to withhold the other track because the singer felt it more suitable for summer, believing that "Between You & Me" "feels like Christmas to me. Like you wanna cuddle up on the couch and drink a really dark red wine to it." Who believes that the song may have been hindered had she still been signed to a major label because it sounds "too different", considering its release to be a "win" and expression of her newfound creative freedom, as well as "another facet of what I do". Who continued, "I just wanna release the music that I wanna release regardless of genre, and especially because of my situation being able to make the record I want to make” without external input. Rolling Stone's Brittany Spanos agreed that the song's release is "A brand new declaration of independence".

Idolator contributor Mike Wass believed that the single's selection indicated that the rest of the album would resemble "a throwback to the bare-bones, super-powered pop" similar to Who's EP The Movement (2013). However, Who contested that the track's acoustic nature was simply an arrangement she felt that song in particular deserved, explaining "It's definitely not an indication of what the rest of the record sounds like, because I think they're all a little bit different. There isn't anything else on the record that is quite like" "Between You & Me", believing that the planned follow-up single would surprise listeners because "it's such a big pop, dance song." Although she agrees that the song's "stripped-back" arrangement is a departure from most of her material, Who explained that each track on Betty was deliberately written to sound different from each other, maintaining that "Between You & Me" "emotionally ... fits really well on the record." "Between You & Me" followed the release of Who's five-track extended play Betty, Pt. 1 (2018).

== Music and lyrics ==
"Between You & Me" is a sensual, emotional acoustic pop song with indie pop influences, lasting three minutes and fifteen seconds (3:15) in duration. Consisting of "plucky", finger-picked acoustic guitars that drive its instrumentation, the song is considered to be a "stripped-back" deviation from the singer's synth-pop repertoire. Beginning with minimal production, the song gradually adopts "a more synth-textured beat," while Who's vocals "remain at the forefront, carrying the emotional weight of the track." Liv Toerkell, writing for The AU Review, agreed that the song "is less the electro house anthem that we are used to ... The mellow guitar play and a quiet synth-textured beat, lay the emotional weight of this stripped-back single entirely onto Betty’s smooth vocals." The same guitar chords are repeated throughout the track, only introducing sparse additional production during its chorus. Music critic Thomas Bleach observed that the song's minimal production mirrors its storyline and emotion. Who believes that "Between You & Me" remains a pop, guitar-driven song with "enough" production.

Mike Nied of Idolator identified the song as a confessional track, beginning with Who singing "It’s too crowded in this bar. We’ve been small-talking so far. I can’t tell if we’re friends. You sure like to make fun of my ex. But we never get past this part." Nicole Engelman of Billboard expressed that, throughout the song, Who longs for "more than friendship" from her friend and love interest. Who sings, "Don’t wanna give myself away, because I’m trying so hard not to say," followed by heartfelt lyrics such as "Just between you and me/I can feel something here/Wondering if you do too.” Who continues "Just between you and me/Can’t help but feeling we’re acting/Like lovers do" using a soft, breathy voice, wondering about her relationship status with her "flirtatious friend" during its hook. Confused by the intentions of her love interest, Who questions how their relationship would progress if they were to explore being intimate with each other for once, beginning "sweet and emotional" before incorporating a sexual "tinge" as the singer wonders "how things could go down," singing, "Why can’t we just address it? Why don’t we start undressing until there’s nothing in between us, in between you and me." The song also discusses themes associated with unrequited love. Florence Johannot of L'Officiel USA likened Who's "raspy but powerful" vocals to those of singers P!nk and Natasha Bedingfield.

According to Rolling Stone's Brittany Spanos, "The verses detail close encounters between the two and her desire for them to make the spark a full-fledged fire." Who described the track as an "inner monologue of everything I wish I could say to that person when you’re in that feeling", elaborating, "the tension between friends that can grow and infest every silence or lingering smile can consume you." However, Who distinguished that the song is "not a confession of love" but rather "a voice in your head narrating your time" together, particularly struggling to verbalize "how you feel when you’re around the person you’re singing to." As such, the protagonist never voices these concerns. Ticketfly described Who's lyrics as "achingly up-close." The Montana Kaimin's Connor Simpson believes that the song exemplifies "The intersection of happiness and anxiety ... familiar to the LGBTQ+ community". Adi Mehta of the Entertainment Voice observed that "Between You & Me"'s lyrics are "suspiciously similar to the refrain of Sisqó’s 'Thong Song'."

== Reception ==
Upon release, "Between You & Me" garnered critical acclaim from several media publications. NewNowNext ranked the song among "5 Songs You Need to Hear Today". Brittany Spanos of Rolling Stone called its hook "infectious". Spanos wrote that, in addition to being "perfect" for "Getting a little closer to a seemingly forbidden crush", the track indicates "a promising start" for the artist. Notion's staff deemed it "an acoustic masterpiece". The AU Review's Liv Toerkell praised Who for successfully delivering "a throwback single, to one’s teenage years, even though it was just released this week." Mike Nied, writing for Idolator, expected the song to be "a serious hit" for the singer with strong airplay potential, encouraging radio stations to play it. Vanyaland's Michael Marotta described "Between You & Me" as "a glistening" track that features Who "clearing her mind and baring her soul." A writer for Contactmusic.com reviewed the song as "an excellent preview of what's to come from Betty Who."

Calling the song "the most well-assembled track" on Betty, The Post critic Halle Weber hailed the track for providing the album with more depth towards the latter half of the LP, describing it as "annoyingly catchy yet simultaneously chill." Weber concluded that "Between You & Me" remains the album's "most impressive" song "because it takes Who out of her comfort zone of old-school-meets-modern dance pop, but she still maintains her signature edge", and found its lustful theme to be a welcome departure from the otherwise "emotionally-charged record." L'Officiel USA's Florence Johannot wrote that the track will "keep [the listener] company on this Friday night" during their walk home. By the end of November 2018, the song had been streamed on Spotify over 400,000 times. By January 2019, the single had amassed more than 500,000 online streams.

== Music video and live performances ==
An accompanying music video for the song was released on 28 November 2018, in which Who stars as a same-sex couple, playing both herself and her love interest as they navigate having strong feelings towards each other. Reprising her role from the music video for her previous single "Taste", in which she had played the same characters, both videos revolve around a relationship between two women. Who herself identifies as bisexual and is an active LGBT ally.

The video explores both "the highs and lows" of the women's relationship. After meeting at a party, the characters proceed to spend more time with and get to know each other in "a will-they-won't-they" dynamic. With a festive Christmas theme, the characters flirt, take photographs and open presents before finally joining each other underneath a mistletoe. Since she was playing both roles, Who was required to film the entire video twice and was surprised to find herself convinced by her own performance, joking, "I can’t believe how bad I wanted me to end up with myself!”

The music video was positively received, particularly by LGBT publications. Out's Glenn Garner described the video as "the cutest queer love story that we need adapted into a feature-length film in time for the holidays". Praising its "powerful pro-LGBT message and striking visuals," Notion hailed the video as an "homage to the year two thousand and gayteen – and proves that next year is going to be just as epic for Australia’s rising pop heroine." Williams of NewNowNext praised the video's "fun concept".

Prior to the beginning of her U. S. tour, Who performed "Between You & Me" live at the Better Sorts Social Club in Boston as part of the Kimpton Nine Zero Hotel's Off the Record series. In September 2019, Who performed the song during the Bustle Rule Breakers 2019 event at the Lefrak Center at Lakeside Prospect Park in Brooklyn, NY.
