= Betty (Betty Who album) =

2019 album by Betty Who

Studio album by Betty Who
- Released: 15 February 2019
- Recorded: 2017–2018
- Genres: Synth-pop; dance-pop
- Length: 42:47
- Label: AWAL
- Producers: Jarrad K; Lyre; The Monsters & Strangerz; Kyle Moorman; Pretty Sister; Peter Thomas

Betty Who chronology
Betty, Pt. 1 (2018)	Betty (2019)	Big! (2022)

Betty Who studio album chronology
The Valley (2017)	Betty (2019)	Big! (2022)

Singles from Betty
- 1. "Ignore Me" Released: 19 January 2018; 2. "Taste" Released: 18 May 2018; 3. "Between You & Me" Released: 14 November 2018; 4. "I Remember" Released: 11 January 2019

Betty is the third studio album by Australian-American singer Betty Who, released on 15 February 2019. The album was preceded by the singles "Ignore Me", "Taste", "Between You & Me", and "I Remember". It is Who's first studio album under the independent record label AWAL, after previously being signed to RCA Records for most of her early career. Betty has been described as a synth-pop and dance-pop album.

== Background and recording ==
On 19 January 2018, Who released "Ignore Me", her first single as an independent artist after parting ways with RCA Records in 2017. She felt it was a necessary step, as the sometimes lagging and slow-paced corporate nature of record labels prevented her from releasing music at the pace she wanted to. In 2018, Who released a remixed version of Widelife's "All Things (Just Keep Getting Better)" to be used as the theme song for season two of the Netflix reboot Queer Eye. A music video was released featuring the cast of Queer Eye and Who.

On 14 November 2018, "Between You and Me" was released as another new single. It was the first single from her then-forthcoming album that had not been previously released on the album's precursory EP. With the release of this single, Betty Who used different shades of blue and photos of herself on her social media profiles to release lyrics to the song. The lyrics that were revealed were "You've got one hand on the wheel", "Sitting at the red light, tensions are high, vibe you could cut with a knife", and "just between you & me, I can feel something here, wondering if you do too". An Instagram post by Betty Who on the day after the release showed that the single already had 22,310 streams on Spotify, and had risen to 31,000 streams two hours later. By 12 December 2018, streams had surpassed 500,000. The music video for this song dropped on 28 November 2018, in which Betty Who plays herself as well as her own love interest. She performed "Language" on Full Frontal with Samantha Bee in August 2019. A music video for "The One" was released on 20 February 2020.

== Release ==
Betty was released on 15 February 2019 to all major digital music stores and streaming platforms. The album saw a physical release on both CD and vinyl on 5 April 2019 and 3 May 2019, respectively.

It peaked at number 24 on the US Independent Albums chart and number 86 on the Top Current Albums charts.

== Critical reception ==
Professional ratings
Review scores
Source	Rating
AllMusic	4/5 stars
Gay Times	5/5 stars
The Music	4/5 stars
PopMatters	7/10

Betty received generally positive reviews from critics, with PopMatters praising the album's exploration of '80s synth-pop as well as comparing it to the works of Carly Rae Jepsen, Robyn, Britney Spears and The 1975.

== Track listing ==
No.	Title	Writer(s)	Producer(s)	Length
1.	"Old Me"	Jessica Newham; Zak Waters; Peter Thomas	Pretty Sister; Thomas; Lyre	2:21
2.	"Do With It"	Newham; Jordan Johnson; Stefan Johnson; Marcus Lomax; Waters	The Monsters & Strangerz; Pretty Sister; Thomas	3:09
3.	"Just Thought You Should Know"	Newham; James Abrahart; Thomas	Kyle Moorman; Thomas	3:23
4.	"I Remember"	Newham; Hailey Collier; Moorman; Thomas	Moorman; Thomas; Lyre	3:35
5.	"Marry Me"	Newham; Evan Bogart; Benjamin Giørtz; Sven Ludwig	Pretty Sister	3:10
6.	"Language"	Newham; Collier; Luke Moellman; Moorman; Jon Sandler; Thomas	Moorman; Thomas	3:10
7.	"Taste"	Newham; Abrahart; Sivert Hjeltnes Hagtvet; Viljar Losnegård; Waters	Pretty Sister	3:22
8.	"All This Woman"	Newham; Jarrad Kritzstein; Waters	Pretty Sister; Jarrad K	3:50
9.	"Between You & Me"	Newham; Abrahart; Thomas; Waters	Thomas; Lyre	3:15
10.	"Ignore Me"	Newham; Brett McLaughlin; Thomas	Thomas; Moorman	3:15
11.	"Whisper"	Newham; Abrahart; Waters	Pretty Sister; Thomas; Lyre	3:06
12.	"The One"	Newham; Waters; Thomas	Pretty Sister; Thomas; Lyre	3:10
13.	"Stop Thinking About You"	Newham; J. Johnson; S. Johnson; Lomax; Waters	Moorman; Thomas; Lyre	3:59
Total length:				42:47

== Charts ==
Chart performance for Betty
Chart (2019)	Peak position
US Independent Albums (Billboard)	24
US Top Current Album Sales (Billboard	86

== Betty, Pt. 1 ==
Betty, Pt. 1

EP by Betty Who
- Released: 15 May 2018
- Recorded: 2017–2018
- Length: 16:41
- Label: AWAL
- Producers: Jarrad K; Kyle Moorman; Pretty Sister; Peter Thomas

Betty Who chronology
The Valley (2017)	Betty, Pt. 1 (2018)	Betty (2019)

Singles from Betty, Pt. 1
- 1. "Ignore Me" Released: 19 January 2018; 2. "Look Back" Released: 9 March 2018; 3. "Taste" Released: 18 May 2018

Betty, Pt.1 is the fourth extended play by Australian singer Betty Who. It was released on 15 June 2018 to digital retailers. The songs "Just Thought You Should Know", "Taste", and "Ignore Me" would later appear on Who's third studio album Betty.

=== Track listing ===
No.	Title	Writer(s)	Producer(s)	Length
1.	"Just Thought You Should Know"	Jessica Newham; James Abrahart; Peter Thomas	Kyle Moorman; Thomas	3:23
2.	"Taste"	Newham; Abrahart; Sivert Hjeltnes Hagtvet; Viljar Losnegård; Zak Waters	Pretty Sister	3:22
3.	"Look Back"	Newham; Leroy Clampitt; Kate Morgan; Jesse St. John		3:04
4.	"Ignore Me"	Newham; Brett McLaughlin; Moorman; Thomas	Thomas; Moorman	3:15
5.	"Friend Like Me"	Newham; Ruston Kelly; Jarrad Kritzstein	Jarrad K	3:37
Total length:				16:41
