= Worlds Apart (Betty Who EP) =

EP / Compilation album by Betty Who
- Released: June 23, 2014
- Genre: Synthpop; power pop
- Length: 15:44
- Label: RCA Records

Betty Who chronology
Spotify Sessions (2014)	Worlds Apart (2014)	Take Me When You Go (2014)

Worlds Apart is the third extended play and first compilation of tracks recorded by Australian-American singer-songwriter Betty Who. The extended play was released in the United Kingdom on 23 June 2014. It was her first release in the United Kingdom. It was released to coincide with Who's "The Hopeless Romantic Tour" which included dates in United Kingdom and the United States throughout May and June 2014.

It contains tracks from Who's previous extended plays, The Movement (2013) and Slow Dancing (2014).

In an interview with Wonderland Magazine, Who explained the title: "Worlds Apart is actually a lyric from the song "Heartbreak Dream"[:] 'In the bridge when you hold me, it feels like you don’t know me, we are worlds apart.' I always like highlighting lyrics in all my songs. It feels like there is at least one lyric that always sneaks by you that you may not pay attention to had it not been highlighted to you initially."

== Reviews ==
Katie Amos of Drunken Werewolf said; "The pounding four-song set stands strong among the upcoming sun-drenched summer anthems of 2014, demanding to be listened to at full volume with the windows rolled down."

Love is Pop website said "...this is the type of release that should please any pop fan. It’s got plenty of mainstream flair yet it also has the vibe of the sort of synth pop that seems to hang out underground these days."

== Track listing ==
No.	Title	Writer(s)	Length
1.	"High Society"	Jess Newham; Peter Thomas	3:51
2.	"Right Here"	Newham; April Bender	3:59
3.	"Heartbreak Dream"	Newham; Thomas	3:50
4.	"You're in Love"	Newham; Thomas	3:59
