= Keep Me Coming =

Keep Me Coming may refer to:

- "Keep Me Coming", a song by Superfruit on Future Friends (2017)
- "Keep Me Comin", a song by Kiss on Creatures of the Night (1982)
- "Keep Me Comin", the third album of Jesse Ed Davis (1973)
