= Zak Waters =

American musician and singer-songwriter

Pretty Sister
- Also known as: Pretty Sister
- Born: Zak Waters; Los Angeles, California, United States
- Origin: Los Angeles, California, United States
- Genres: Pop; R&B; soul; electropop; EDM; nu-disco
- Occupations: Singer; songwriter; record producer; musician
- Instruments: Vocals; piano; guitar; bass
- Years active: 2007–present
- Labels: Manhattan; Magic; Faux; Rostrum; Spinnin'; Warner/Chappell; Universal Motown; Sumerian
- Formerly of: Blueskyreality
- Website: www.prettysistermusic.com

Zak Waters (born January 22) is an American musician, singer-songwriter and record producer. Born in Los Angeles, California, he is also prominently known by the stage name Pretty Sister. Waters began his music career forming the band Blueskyreality. After the group disbanded, Waters started his solo music career, releasing his debut extended play (EP), New Normal (2011).

He featured on Madeon's 2012 multi-platinum single "The City", to positive acclaim, charting at number 20 on the US Hot Dance Club Songs chart and number 16 on the UK Dance Chart. He released his debut studio album, Lip Service, on September 9, 2013. The following year, he released his second EP, Now // Later on Rostrum Records. He collaborated on Adventure Club's single "Fade", which became certified gold by the RIAA. He also collaborated on other popular singles including Adventure Club and David Solano's "Unleash (Life In Color 2014)" and Alex Gaudino and Manufactured Superstars's 2015 single "Lights Go Out". He appeared on the American songwriting competition series Songland in 2020.

As Pretty Sister, he has released one studio album, Catalina (2021), and three extended plays, Z Funk Era, Vol. 1 (2018), Poolside Vibe (2019), and 20 (2020). He has featured on other artists' singles including Nause's platinum-selling 2015 single "Dynamite" and Keljet's "Love At First Site" and LDN Noise's "Tears", which was released in August 2016. He has collaborated and produced for numerous other music artists such as Betty Who, Breathe Carolina, Nathan Sykes, Superfruit and JoJo, among others.

== Music career ==
=== 2007–12: Beginnings and New Normal ===
Zak Waters was born and raised in Los Angeles, California. He first started writing and recording music with the pop rock group Blueskyreality, who signed to Universal Republic Records in 2008. After the group's departure, Waters began writing music as a solo artist. He released his debut single "Unstoppable" on June 21, 2011. He wrote, recorded, and mixed his debut EP album, New Normal, with friend and record producer Jarrad Kritzstein. The album was released on August 2, 2011, and was recorded at The Room Of Requirement and The Woods Studios in Los Angeles.

Waters released the single "Skinny Dippin' in the Deep End" on June 18, 2012. The music video for the single was released the following day. On August 24, 2012, French electronic music producer Madeon released his collaborative single "The City", featuring Zak Waters. To date, "The City" has been Waters' most popular single achieving chart success worldwide, charting at No. 74 on the U.K. Singles chart, No. 20 on the U.S. Billboard Hot Dance Club Songs chart, No. 16 on the U.K. Dance Singles chart, and No. 13 in Hungary.

In October 2012, Waters released a remix of Adam Lambert's single "Trespassing".

=== 2013–14: Lip Service and Now // Later EP ===
He released another solo single, "Runnin' Around", accompanied with its music video, on January 22, 2013. Waters collaborated with the electronic music duo Candyland and released the single "Not Coming Down" on July 8, 2013, through Beatport. A remix EP, Not Coming Down (The Remixes), was later released in April 2014.

On August 27, 2013, Waters released the single "Penelope" and revealed that he would release his debut full-length studio album, Lip Service, on September 9 exclusively on Spotify. In support of the album, he performed with his full live band at The Satellite in Los Angeles for a month-long free residency every Monday night beginning September 2.

On January 28, 2014, Waters released the single "Over You". Canadian electro house music duo Adventure Club released the collaborative single, "Unleash", featuring Zak Waters and David Solano, as part of the Life In Color 2014 celebration on April 2, 2014. Waters released his first EDM-produced single "Out Of My Head", featuring Codi Caraco, on April 17, 2014.

Waters released his cover of R&B singer Ginuwine's 1996 single "Pony", on June 3, 2014, to criticism. He released his second EP, Now // Later, on June 17, 2014, through FAUX and Rostrum Records. The EP features five tracks, two of which are covers and three being previously released singles; "Sleeping in My T-Shirt", "Over You", and "Said and Gone", featuring Audra Mae (previously titled Dear John"), all of which were featured on Waters' studio album Lip Service.

On December 31, 2014, Waters released the single "By the End Of the Night".

=== 2015–18: Z Funk Era ===
Alex Gaudino released the collaborative single, "Lights Go Out", featuring Zak Waters and Manufactured Superstars on April 18, 2015.

Pretty Sister, Zak Waters' solo musical endeavor, was introduced in 2015. Pretty Sister released its first single "Drive" on February 6, 2016. Speaking about the single with Popology Now, Waters says:

"I wrote this song from the perspective of someone who just moved [to LA]. I'll never forget coming back here, smelling the smog and seeing the hazy sunsets over the 405. So when writing the song I thought about what must it be like to have just moved here from Michigan or New York or Detroit? Driving through Laurel Canyon with the palm trees and then sun and the warmth...the feeling of endless possibility and beautiful people all around you...it must be pretty exciting. I grew up in it and shit, it still excites me every day."

Another single, "Come to LA", was released on March 18, 2016. A third single, "West Coast", was released on June 12, 2016. Pretty Sister and LDN Noise premiered the collaborative single, "Tears", on July 1, 2016, through GoodMusicAllDay.

Netherlands based nu-disco producer Keljet released the joint-single "Love At First Sight", featuring Pretty Sister, on August 5, 2016.

Swedish electronic house duo Nause released the dance-pop single, "Dynamite", featuring Pretty Sister on August 30, 2016. "Dynamite" has achieved international mainstream success charting at No. 13 on the Swedish Music Charts, becoming 3× platinum. It also peaked at No. 30 in Poland and became platinum in Norway and certified gold in the Netherlands and Canada. A music video for the song premiered on November 1, 2017.

Waters produced and composed the songs "Sexy Ladies" and "GUY.exe" on web show duo Superfruit's debut studio album, Future Friends, released on September 15, 2017. He also co-wrote and produced American singer Liz Huett's single "H8U", which was released on October 27, 2017.

On October 27, 2017, a new song titled "Feelin Good", which samples the 1981 single "Never Too Much" by American singer Luther Vandross, was released for free on SoundCloud. He toured as support on Betty Who's Party in the Valley Tour from February 24 to March 31, 2018, and on SUP3RFRUIT's Future Friends tour from May 23 to June 13, 2018.

Waters produced Betty Who's single "Taste", which was released on May 18, 2018.

Pretty Sister released the single "Ten$ion", featuring American rapper White Gold, on June 1, 2018. The music video for "Ten$ion" features an appearance from singer Betty Who. He released another single, entitled "New Fire", featuring American singer MarcLo, on July 27, 2018. On August 27, Waters revealed he would be releasing a new EP in 2018. Waters had recording sessions with Betty Who, Scott Hoying, and Rozzi Crane throughout the summer of 2018, resulting in the single "Lose Us" by Rozzi featuring Scott Hoying, released on October 12, 2018, which was produced and co-written by Waters.

Pretty Sister announced its debut EP, Z-Funk Era, Vol. 1, released on November 2, 2018. The following year, Betty Who released her third studio album, Betty, on February 19, 2019, in which nine tracks off the album were produced and co-written by Waters.

=== 2019–20: Poolside Vibe and 20 ===
On May 17, 2019, Pretty Sister released the single, "Kingdom In the Valley". The following month, he released a studio cover of Christina Aguilera's 2000 single "Come On Over Baby (All I Want Is You)", alternatively titled "Come On Over", on June 21.

On July 17, 2019, he released the single "Poolside Vibe", featuring MarcLo. The duo released another song, "Tequila", on September 13. Pretty Sister and MarcLo released a collaborative EP, Poolside Vibe, on October 10.

In March 2020, it was revealed that Waters would serve as a songwriter on the NBC's songwriting competition TV series, Songland. On March 31, 2020, Pretty Sister released a dance-pop cover of Sam Hunt's single "House Party". The following month, he released a four-track extended play, aptly titled 20, on April 10, 2020.

In May 2020, Waters appeared on NBC's Songland where he performed his original track "Bad Things", to which he later uploaded a stripped-down version on YouTube.

On October 16, the single "More Than Friends" by EDM duo Love Thy Brother and Pretty Sister was released. The following week, French house duo Lemaitre released the single "Day 4", also featuring Pretty Sister. He released the Christmas themed single "XXX" on December 25, which served as the lead single from his studio album, Catalina.

=== 2021–present: Catalina ===
Swedish dance music duo Nause released "Crystal Vision", a collaboration which features Pretty Sister and Middle Milk, on January 15, 2021. A lyric video was uploaded on Spinnin Records on January 27.

On January 22, 2021, Pretty Sister released the song "Flirting with Disaster", which serves as the second single from his debut studio album as Pretty Sister, Catalina. "Convenience" was released as the third single from the album on March 5. The fourth and fifth singles "Pull Me Back" and "Diamonds In the Ring" were each released in April and June, respectively.

== Television appearances ==
Zak Waters appeared on the seventh episode of NBC's songwriting competition show Songland, performing his original song "Bad Things", which progressed him into the top-three. OneRepublic frontman Ryan Tedder produced and co-wrote the new version of "Bad Things" to which Waters also performed on the television show.

== Musical influence and sound ==
Zak Waters has been noted for "blending the futuristic funk of Jamiroquai, the pulsing electro-beat of Daft Punk, and the classic groove of Earth, Wind, and Fire." He has been labeled as a DJ, record producer, and a pop artist. Waters incorporates elements of neo-funk, G-funk, electronic dance music, and R&B into his music often identifying as "Z-funk".

== Discography ==
=== As solo artist ===
Studio albums

- Lip Service (2013) (exclusive to Spotify, limited physical CDs)
- Z-Funk Era (2015) (exclusive to Manhattan Recordings in Japan)

EPs

- New Normal (2011)
- Now // Later (2014)
- Limited (2014)

Singles

- "Unstoppable" (2011)
- "Skinny Dippin' In the Deep End" (2012)
- "Runnin' Around" (2013)
- "Penelope" (2013)
- "Over You" (2014)
- "Out Of My Head" featuring Codi Caraco (2014)
- "Pony" (Ginuwine cover) (2014)
- "By the End Of the Night" (2014)

As featured artist

- "The City", performed by Madeon from the album The City (2012)
- "Not Coming Down", performed by Candyland (2013)
- "Show More Love", performed by LENNO from the album Never Stop (2013)
- "Unleash (Life In Color 2014)", performed by Adventure Club and David Solano (2014)
- "Fade", performed by Adventure Club (2014)
- "Lights Go Out", performed by Alex Gaudino and Manufactured Superstars (2015)

=== As Pretty Sister ===
Studio albums

- Catalina (2021)

EPs

- Z-Funk Era, Vol, 1 (2018)
- Poolside Vibe (2019) (with MarcLo)
- 20 (2020)

Singles

- "Pony" (2015)
- "Drive" (2016)
- "Come to LA" (2016)
- "West Coast" (2016)
- "Tears" (2016) (with LDN Noise)
- "Galactic Appeal" (2016) (with Dragonette)
- "Thirsty" (2016)
- "Tension" (2018) (with White Gold)
- "New Fire" (2018) (with MarcLo)
- "Kingdom In the Valley" (2019)
- "Come On Over" (2019) (cover of "Come On Over Baby (All I Want Is You)" by Christina Aguilera)
- "Poolside Vibe" (2019) (with MarcLo)
- "Tequila" (2019) (with MarcLo)
- "Convenience" (2021)

As featured artist

- "Dynamite", performed by Nause (2016)
- "Love At First Sight", performed by Keljet (2016)
- "More Than Friends", performed by Love Thy Brother (2020)
- "Day 4", performed by Lemaitre (2020)
- "Flowerbby", performed by Abhi the Nomad (2021)

=== With Blueskyreality ===
EPs

- The EP (2007)
- The Cabin Sessions (2009)

=== As songwriter and producer ===
Title	Year	Artist(s)	Album	Credits
"Old Italian Love Songs"	2012	Audra Mae	Audra Mae & the Almighty Sound	Co-writer
"Black Cinderella"	2015	Kento Nakajima	Sexy Power 3	Co-writer
"Married to the Music"	2015	SHINee	Married to the Music	Co-writer
"Savior"	2015	SHINee	Married to the Music	Co-writer, producer
"High Heels"	2016	JoJo	Mad Love	Co-writer
"Taken"	2016	Nathan Sykes	Unfinished Business	Producer
"Getaway Car" (featuring Reez & Ray Little)	2016	Breathe Carolina	Sleepless (EP)	Co-writer; producer
"Free to Fly" (featuring Warren G)	2017	Betty Who	The Valley	Co-writer; producer
"Pretend You're Missing Me"	2017	Betty Who	The Valley	Co-writer
"Make You Memories"	2017	Betty Who	The Valley	Producer
"Beautiful" (featuring Superfruit)	2017	Betty Who	The Valley	Co-writer; producer
"You Can Cry Tomorrow"	2017	Betty Who	The Valley	Co-writer
"Sexy Ladies"	2017	Superfruit	Future Friends	Co-writer; producer
"GUY.exe"	2017	Superfruit	Future Friends	Co-writer; producer
"H8U"	2017	Liz Huett	Non-album single	Co-writer; producer
"Marrow"	2017	VINCINT	Non-album single	Producer
"Taste"	2018	Betty Who	Betty, Pt. 1	Producer
"SADE IN THE 90s"	2018	Qveen Herby	EP 3	Co-writer
"LIVIN THE DREAM"	2018	Qveen Herby	EP 3	Co-writer
"Lose Us" (featuring Scott Hoying)	2018	Rozzi	Bad Together	Co-writer; producer
"My Man"	2019	Qveen Herby	EP 5	Co-writer
"The Promise"	2019	Superfruit	Non-album single	Producer
"Old Me"	2019	Betty Who	Betty	Co-writer; producer
"Do With It"	2019	Betty Who	Betty	Co-writer; producer
"Marry Me"	2019	Betty Who	Betty	Co-writer; producer
"All This Woman"	2019	Betty Who	Betty	Co-writer; producer
"Whisper"	2019	Betty Who	Betty	Co-writer; producer
"The One"	2019	Betty Who	Betty	Co-writer; producer
"Between You & Me"	2019	Betty Who	Betty	Co-writer
"Stop Thinking About You"	2019	Betty Who	Betty	Co-writer
"Mine"	2020	VINCINT	Non-album single	Co-writer; producer
"Say"	2020	VINCINT	Non-album single	Co-writer; producer
"Best Friend Song"	2020	Rozzi	Non-album single	Co-writer; producer
"Halftime"	2020	Jordin Sparks	Sounds Like Me (EP)	Co-writer; producer
"Déjà Vu"	2020	Jordin Sparks	Sounds Like Me (EP)	Co-writer; producer
"First Kiss Playlist"	2020	Jordin Sparks	Sounds Like Me (EP)	Co-writer; producer
"Man's World"	2020	Nova Miller	The Passion	Co-writer; producer
"Wake Up At Our Funeral"	2021	Chelsea Collins	Non-album single	Co-writer; producer
"I Can't Go to the Party"	2021	Rozzi	Hymn for the Weekend (EP)	Co-writer; producer
"If I'm Gonna Love You"	2021	Rozzi	Hymn for the Weekend (EP)	Co-writer
"Flower Baby"	2021	Abhi the Nomad (featuring Pretty Sister)	Abhi vs. The Universe	Co-writer
"Time"	2021	Maty Noyes	The Feeling's Mutual	Co-writer; producer
"Mad World"	2021	Maty Noyes	The Feeling's Mutual	Co-writer; producer
"Slow Cookin'"	2021	Willie Jones	Slow Cookin' & Soul Food: The 2 Piece Combo (EP)	Co-writer

=== Remixes ===
Title	Year	Artist(s)
"Trespassing" (Zak Waters Radio Remix)	2012	Adam Lambert
"Heartbeat Slowing Down" (Zak Waters Remix)	2013	The All-American Rejects
"Not Coming Down" (Zak Waters Remix)	2014	Candyland (featuring Zak Waters)
"Some Kind of Wonderful" (Pretty Sister Remix)	2017	Betty Who
"My Friends" (Pretty Sister Remix)	2018	Bohnes
