= Superfruit (duo) =

American music duo

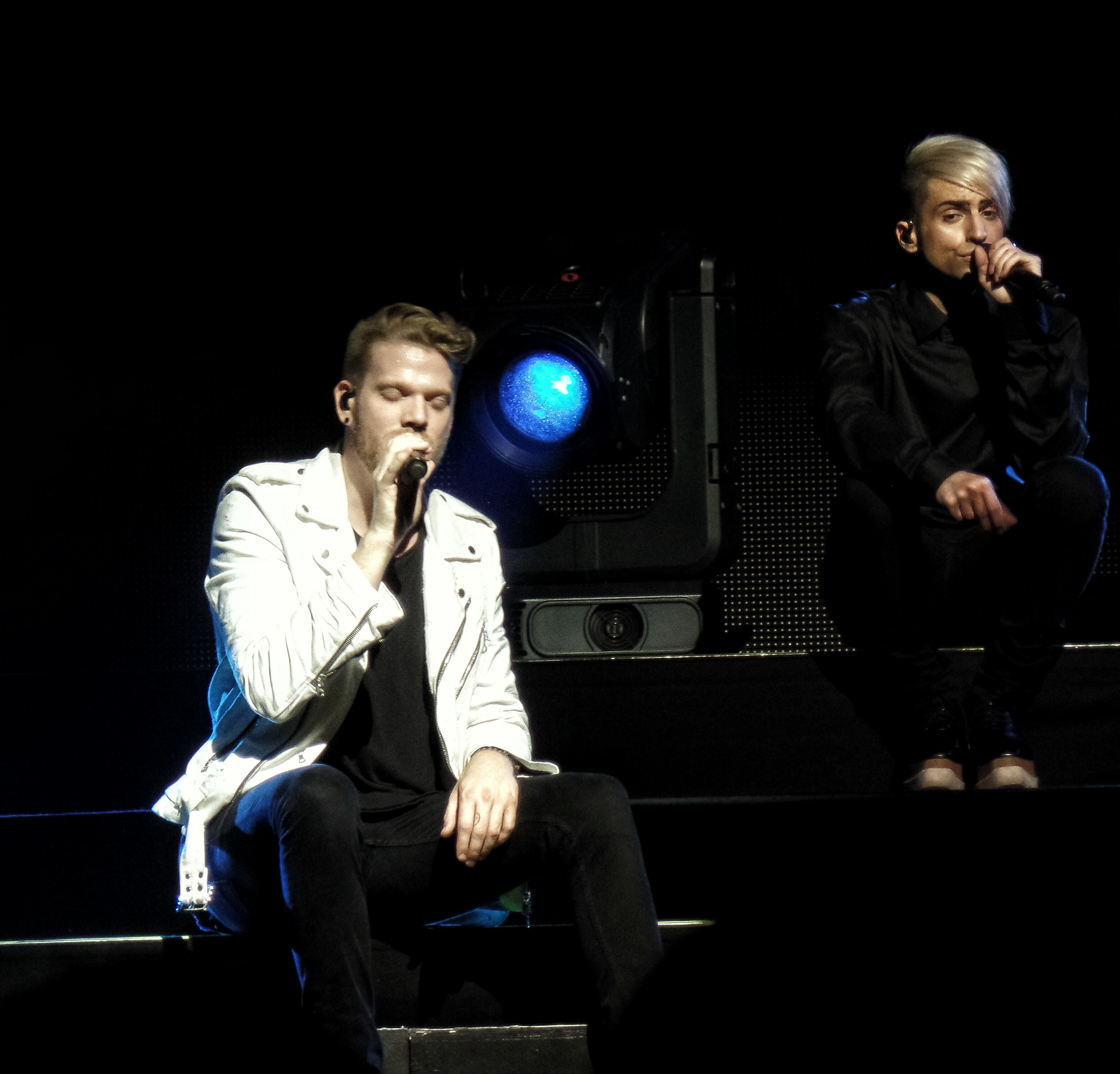
- Mitch Grassi (right) and Scott Hoying (left) performing as part of Pentatonix in June 2016

YouTube information
- Channel: SUPERFRUIT
- Genres: Music; comedy
- Subscribers: 2.34 million
- Views: 511.7 million
- Last updated: July 10, 2023

Superfruit (often stylized as SUP3RFRUIT) is an American musical and comedy duo consisting of Mitch Grassi and Scott Hoying, both known as members of the a cappella group Pentatonix. Superfruit is also the name of their comedy show, featured on their eponymous YouTube channel. Their channel was created in August 2013 with a focus on comedic vlogs and music performances. As of July 2023, the channel has over 2.4 million subscribers and over 481 million views.

In 2016, the duo became more involved in musical activities, with the releases of their first original songs, "Bad 4 Us" on October 18 and "Sweet Life" on November 15. On June 30, 2017, the duo released their first EP, Future Friends: Part One, followed on September 15 by both the EP Future Friends: Part Two, and Future Friends, which acted as a compilation album containing both EPs and Superfruit's debut studio album. Superfruit's sound differs from their a cappella work with Pentatonix as it features electric and electronic instruments, while retaining their usual pop, melody-oriented style.

== YouTube channel ==
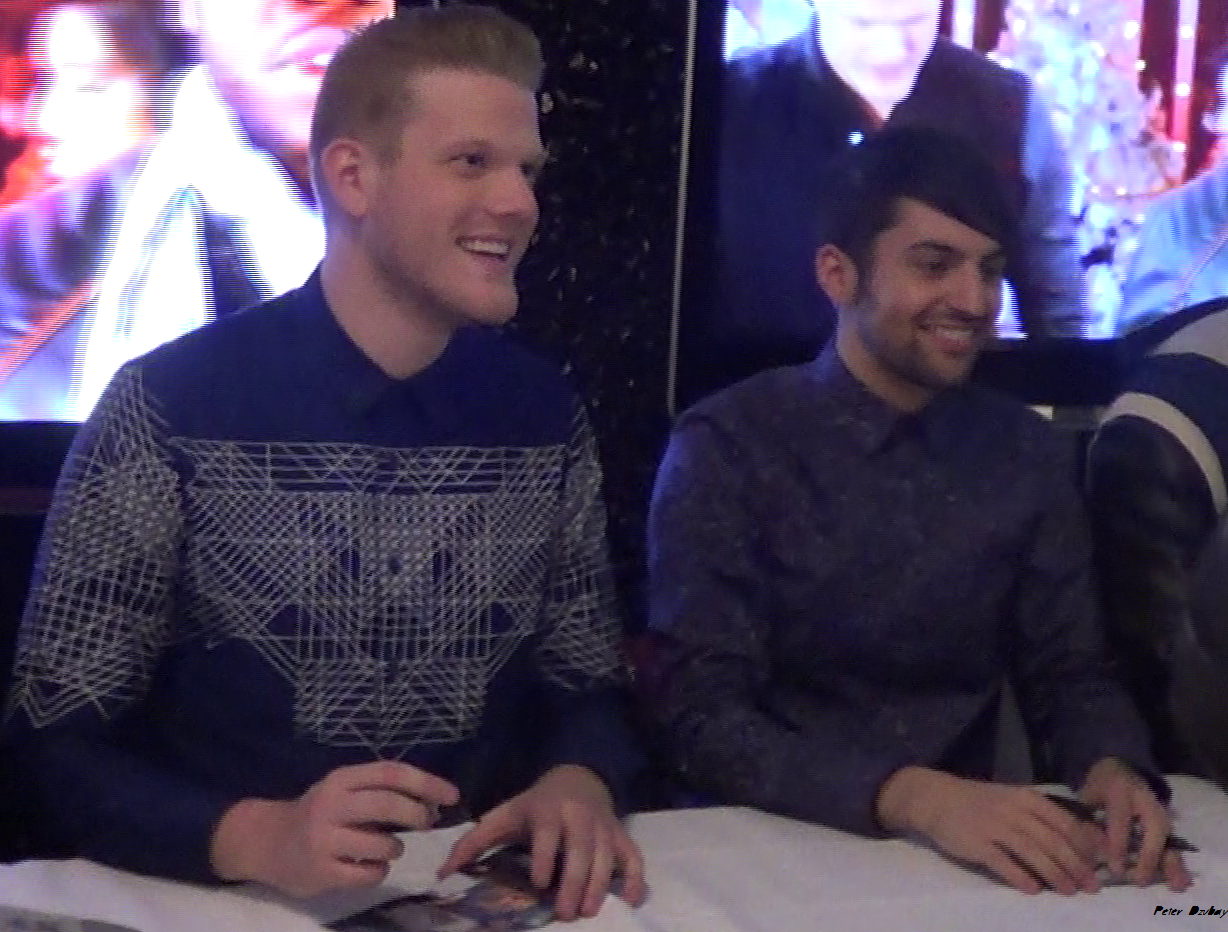
Hoying (left) and Grassi (right) at a signing in New York in 2014.

According to Grassi, he and Hoying were at IHOP and discussed how they wanted to individually start YouTube channels, but eventually decided to launch one together. According to Hoying, the name Superfruit "came from Mitch's random mind". The first Superfruit video was uploaded on August 13, 2013.

Superfruit consists mainly of comedic vlogs and various casual games and competitions, but the channel also features a number of musical projects. Most videos solely feature Hoying and Grassi, but some include other musical artists or non-musical guests. Both Grassi and Hoying identify as gay.

In 2019, ice skater Adam Rippon appeared in Superfruit's "The Promise" music video.

Since 2020, Superfruit's social media have remained dormant, with the exception of re-uploading GUY.exe on October 12, 2021 due to its popularity on TikTok.

== Discography ==
=== Studio albums ===
List of studio albums, with selected information
Title	Details	Peak chart positions	
Title	Details	US	CAN
Future Friends	Released: September 15, 2017; Label: RCA; Formats: CD, digital download, streaming	29	70

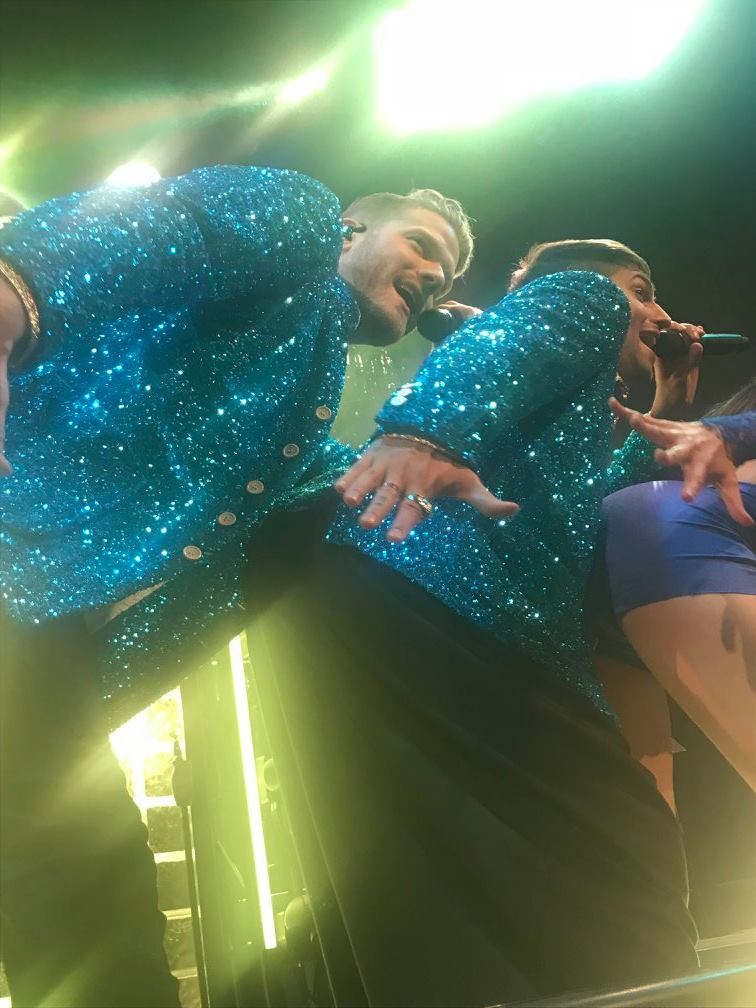
Superfruit performing in New York City, 2018

=== Extended plays ===
List of extended plays, with selected information
Title	Details	Peak chart positions	
Title	Details	US	CAN
Future Friends – Part One	Released: June 30, 2017; Label: RCA; Formats: Digital download, streaming	33	57
Future Friends – Part Two	Released: September 15, 2017; Label: RCA; Formats: Digital download, streaming	–	–

=== Singles ===
List of singles
Title	Year	Album
"The Promise"	2019	Non-album single

== Tours ==
- Future Friends Tour (2018)

== Other notable works ==
Outside of their YouTube channel, Superfruit promoted The SpongeBob Movie: Sponge Out of Water with an MTV commercial in which Grassi receives a tattoo of SpongeBob SquarePants on his arm.

Grassi and Hoying have been featured on other artists' music, such as Betty Who's "Beautiful" from her studio album The Valley. Additionally, Superfruit was featured alongside Kirstin Maldonado on Todrick Hall's "Black & White" from the deluxe edition of Straight Outta Oz.

In January 2018, the duo guest starred on Good Mythical Morning where they played the "Duo or Don't-O Challenge".

== Awards and nominations ==
=== World Choreography Awards ===
Year	Category	Work	Result	Ref.
2017	Best Choreography in a Music Video	Sweet Life	Won	
