= Big! (Betty Who album) =

Studio album by Betty Who
- Released: October 14, 2022
- Studio: The Lodge West (Park City)
- Genre: Dance-pop
- Length: 32:29
- Label: BMG Rights Management
- Producer: Martin Johnson; Brandon Paddock; Branen Rector; Betty Who

Betty Who chronology
Betty (2019)	Big! (2022)

Singles from Big!
- 1. "Blow Out My Candle" Released: June 3, 2022; 2. "She Can Dance" Released: July 19, 2022; 3. "Big" Released: October 12, 2022

Big! is the fourth studio album by American–Australian singer Betty Who, released on October 14, 2022. Upon release, the album received positive reviews from critics.

== Recording and release ==
I am probably the most committed to performance and being myself, and through that trying to lead by example of owning your best and worst features. You know, living into who you were always born to be. I think that that's a big theme of this record and something I really want to encourage others to do; to be able to be themselves in whatever way that means.

—Betty Who on the themes of Big!

Big! is Who's fourth full-length studio album and has lyrical themes about her childhood, growing up as a particularly tall girl and being bullied for it and the process of accepting herself and her body as an adult. The singer considers this album a deeply personal, new phase in her recording career and asked her producers to think of her as a radically different performer, including considering her a gay man when singing some songs. Songwriting on this album also discusses personal "relationships, life expectancies, and experiences" and includes the dance-pop styles that are typical of Who's music as well as lighter pop music influences like Sara Bareilles and John Mayer. The personal details of Who's life captured on the album including writing a song to her 10-year-old self and thanking her in the liner notes and including a voicemail from one of her best friends as a track.

== Critical reception ==
Editors at AllMusic rated this album four out of five stars, naming it among the Best of 2022, with critic Heather Phares writing that the singer "open[s] up like never before" when talking about her experience of being bullied in school and that on this album, "her music has never sounded so complete or satisfying". In Metro Weekly, Sean Maunier gave this album four out of five stars for having "Who's distinct voice... once again at the forefront of the album" and for building on her "already-strong foundation" of pop musicianship.

== Track listing ==
1. "Big" (Ferras Alqaisi, Martin Johnson, Meghan Kabir, Danen Rector, and Betty Who) – 3:36
2. "Weekend" (Johnson, Danen Rector, Geoffrey Warburton, and Who) – 3:33
3. "Hey, It's Betty" (Johnson, Brandon Paddock, Rector, and Who) – 1:20
4. "Blow Out My Candle" (Justin Breit, Johnson, Justin Slaven, and Who) – 2:59
5. "I Can Be Your Man" (Breit, Johnson, Rector, Slaven, and Who) – 3:27
6. "She Can Dance" (Johnson, Paddock, Rector, and Who) – 3:04
7. "Someone Else" (Johnson, Rector, Casey Smith, Peter Thomas, and Who) – 3:34
8. "The Hard Way" (Alqaisi, Johnson, Meghan Kabir, Rector, and Who) – 3:25
9. "One of Us" (Ryland Blackinton, Johnson, Joe London, Boy Matthews, Rector, Thomas, and Who) – 2:44
10. "Amelia's Voicemail" (Johnson, Rector, Who, Amelia Wright) – 0:53
11. "Grown Ups Grow Apart" (Johnson, Paddock, Zak Waters, and Who) – 3:54

== Personnel ==
- Betty Who – vocals, cello, guitar, keyboards, piano, production
- Kate Biel – creative direction
- Jeff Braun – mixing at Anthem House, Nashville, Tennessee, United States
- Zak Cassar – photography
- Adam Grover – mastering at Sterling Sound, Nashville, Tennessee, United States
- Matt Huber – mixing at Anthem House, Nashville, Tennessee, United States
- Martin Johnson – guitar, vocals, keyboards, programming, engineering, production
- Naomi Cooke Johnson – backing vocals
- Brandon Paddock – guitar, keyboards, piano, backing vocals, programming, engineering, production
- Danen Rector – bass guitar, guitar, keyboards, percussion, vocals, programming, engineering, production
- Cliff Tanner – design
- Amelia Wright – vocals

== See also ==
- Lists of 2022 albums
