= Ignore Me =

Single by Betty Who

from the EP Betty, Pt. 1 and the album Betty
- Released: 19 January 2018
- Recorded: 2017–18
- Genre: Electropop; synth-pop
- Length: 3:15
- Songwriter(s): Betty Who; Brett McLaughlin; Kyle Moorman; Peter Thomas
- Producer(s): Peter Thomas; Kyle Moorman

Betty Who singles chronology
"If You're Hearing This" (2017)	"Ignore Me" (2018)	"Look Back" (2018)

Music video
- "Ignore Me" on YouTube

"Ignore Me" is a song by Australian singer and songwriter Betty Who, released as the first single in a series of monthly releases, on 19 January 2018. It was released as the lead single from her third studio album, Betty (2019). "Ignore Me" is Betty's first single as an independent artist, after parting the previous year with her former record label, RCA Records.

The video for the song is a choreographed pop pas de deux-style performance starring Betty Who and Canadian-Iranian model/actor Navid Charkhi. The video is notable for being a one shot video, in which continuous action is filmed by a single camera. Who stated in an interview that the official video version was only their third full take of the choreography.

== Track listing ==
- Digital download
1. "Ignore Me" – 3:15
