= Take Me When You Go =

Studio album by Betty Who
- Released: 3 October 2014
- Recorded: 2012–2014
- Studio: Capitol Studios, LA; Conway Recording Studios, Hollywood, CA; Fort Knox, Sherman Oaks, CA; Pulse Recording, Los Angeles, CA; The Boiler Room, Sherman Oaks, CA; The Bubble, Boston, MA; The Estate, London, UK; The Lodge, West Hollywood, CA; The Rose Cottage, East Greenwich, RI; Westlake Recording Studios, Los Angeles, CA
- Genre: Pop; synth-pop; dance-pop; power pop
- Length: 49:48
- Label: RCA
- Producer: David Ryan Harris; Martin Johnson; Mag; Kyle Moorman; Vaughn Oliver; Brandon Paddock; Starsmith; Peter Thomas

Betty Who chronology
Worlds Apart (2014)	Take Me When You Go (2014)	The Valley (2017)

Singles from Take Me When You Go
- 1. "Somebody Loves You" Released: 30 November 2012; 2. "Heartbreak Dream" Released: 18 February 2014; 3. "All of You" Released: 16 September 2014

Take Me When You Go is the debut studio album by Australian-American recording artist Betty Who, released on 3 October 2014 by RCA Records. The album is preceded by the extended plays The Movement, Slow Dancing and Worlds Apart.

Who writes from the perspective of a millennial learning to navigate breakups, loves of all shapes and sizes, and coming to terms with her own growing maturity. In an interview with Billboard she said "A lot of the relationships that inspired this record ended with me coming to terms with [the fact] that I love myself far too much to be anybody's second choice. That was a huge growth for me that led to the arc, the storyline of this record."

== Commercial performance ==
Take Me When You Go debuted at number 68 on the Billboard 200, selling 5,000 copies in its first week.

== Critical reception ==
Professional ratings
Review scores
Source	Rating
AllMusic	3.5/5 stars
Consequence of Sound	C+
Idolator	4/5
PopMatters	6/10

Take Me When You Go received general acclaim upon release. Heather Phares from AllMusic said; "Take Me When You Go has a lot of appealing moments". Phares complemented "The Whitney Houston-inspired 'Somebody Loves You'", and said "'Heartbreak Dream' remains soaringly romantic and 'Alone Again' continues to charm with its flirtatious yet bittersweet melody and slowly shredding guitar solo, which gives even more cred to Who's '80s devotion." Janine Schaults from Consequence of Sound said "Combining Adele's hopeless romanticism, Pink's spunky streak, and Madonna's early whimsy seems like a potion ready-made for radio domination...Yet, Miss Betty can't shake a 'been there, done that' feel." but added "That's not to say [Who] doesn't conjure exquisite moments. Coincidentally, these fleeting instances of perfection occur when she strips away all the trimmings of a pop princess." Robbie Daw from Idolator said "Bottom line: Betty Who's first album is as good as you hoped. In that regard, she's done her job and delivered on the promise of that first EP from 18 months ago." Enio Chiola from PopMatters said "It's an album filled to the brim with tracks that, on their own, are really quite good, but lack enough diversity to keep you interested for all 13 songs." Chiola complemented tracks "Just Like Me", "High Society", "Glory Days" and "Somebody Loves You".

Brennan Carley from Spin magazine said "Betty is at her absolute best when she lets us see the cracks in her gloss, like on the halting wallop of an album opener 'Just Like Me'" and said the stand out track is "Dreaming About You", adding "[it's] a smart dance album that's both totally of the moment and also mindful of its lengthy list of pop predecessors." Spinalso included the album on their list of the best albums of 2014.

== Track listing ==
No.	Title	Writer(s)	Producer(s)	Length
1.	"Just Like Me"	Betty Who; Peter Thomas; Marco Borrero	Thomas; Mag; Jay Vice^{[a]}	3:38
2.	"High Society"	Who; Thomas	Thomas	4:00
3.	"Glory Days"	Who; Martin Johnson; Thomas	Johnson; Thomas^{[b]}; Brandon Paddock^{[b]}; Kyle Moorman^{[b]}	4:02
4.	"Somebody Loves You"	Who; Thomas	Thomas	3:30
5.	"Missing You"	Who; Claude Kelly; Thomas; Colin Norman	Thomas; Vice^{[a]}; Kelly^{[c]}	3:32
6.	"Better"	Who; Finlay Dow-Smith; Scott Hoffman	Starsmith; Vice^{[a]}	3:48
7.	"All of You"	Who; Thomas	Thomas	3:58
8.	"Runaways"	Who; Thomas; Pete Sallis	Thomas; Vaughn Oliver; Vice^{[a]}	3:29
9.	"A Night to Remember"	Who; Johnson	Johnson; Paddock^{[b]}; Moorman^{[b]}	3:54
10.	"Heartbreak Dream"	Who; Thomas	Thomas; Vice^{[c]}	3:49
11.	"Alone Again"	Who; Thomas	Thomas; David Ryan Harris; Vice^{[c]}	3:46
12.	"Dreaming About You"	Who; Johnson	Thomas; Johnson; Paddock^{[b]}; Moorman^{[b]}	3:49
13.	"California Rain"	Who; Thomas	Thomas; Vice^{[a]}	4:33

Deluxe edition bonus tracks
No.	Title	Length
14.	"You're in Love"	3:54
15.	"Lovin' Start"	4:12
16.	"Silas"	4:48
17.	"Giving Me Away"	3:56
18.	"Right Here"	3:59

Notes

- ^{^a} signifies a vocal producer
- ^{^b} signifies an additional producer
- ^{^c} signifies an additional vocal producer

== Personnel ==
Credits adapted from the liner notes of Take Me When You Go.

- Betty Who – vocals (all tracks); gang vocals (tracks 1, 3); keyboards (track 12); additional instrumentation, piano, programming (track 13); executive producer
- Helene Valvatne Andås – back tray image
- John August – backing vocals, gang vocals (tracks 3, 12); additional programming (track 12)
- Pran Bandi – engineering (track 4)
- Lindsey Cook – A&R
- Chris Gehringer – mastering
- Serban Ghenea – mixing (tracks 2–4, 9, 12)
- Erwin Gorostiza – creative director
- John Hanes – engineering for mix (tracks 2–4, 9, 12)
- David Ryan Harris – additional instrumentation, guitar, guitar solo, keyboards, production, programming (track 11)
- Michelle Holme – art direction, design
- Marcus Johnson – engineering assistance (tracks 3, 9, 12)
- Martin Johnson – acoustic guitar (track 3); additional instrumentation, backing vocals, gang vocals, keyboards, piano (tracks 3, 12); bass, electric guitar, engineering, percussion, production, programming (tracks 3, 9, 12)
- Claude Kelly – additional vocal production (track 5)
- Manya Kuzemchenko – cover design
- Mag – additional instrumentation, bass, guitar, keyboards, piano, production, programming (track 1)
- Shane McCauley – photography
- Molly McCook – additional backing vocals (track 12)
- Kyle Moorman – additional production, engineering (tracks 3, 9, 12); programming (tracks 3, 12); gang vocals (track 3)
- Vaughn Oliver – mixing (tracks 7, 8); additional instrumentation, guitar, keyboards, production, programming (track 8)
- Brandon Paddock – additional production, engineering, programming (tracks 3, 9, 12); gang vocals (tracks 3, 12); bass (track 9)
- Nick Price – gang vocals (track 4)
- Mike Roberts – additional engineering (track 1); engineering (tracks 2, 4); mixing (tracks 10, 11)
- Max Schad – mixing (tracks 5, 13)
- Ethan Schiff – management
- John Schmidt – engineering assistance (track 9)
- Starsmith – drum programming, keyboards, mixing, production, synthesizer (track 6)
- Peter Thomas – bass (track 1); additional instrumentation, programming (tracks 1, 2, 4, 5, 8, 10–13); keyboards (tracks 1, 2, 4, 5, 8, 10, 11); production (track 1, 2, 4, 7, 8, 10–13); guitar (tracks 1, 2, 4, 8, 10–12); gang vocals (tracks 1, 3); piano (tracks 1, 13); additional production (track 3); executive producer
- Jay Vice – engineering (tracks 1, 13); vocal production (tracks 1, 5, 6, 8, 13); additional vocal production (tracks 10, 11); additional programming (track 13)
- Eric Von – engineering (tracks 10, 11)
- Miles Walker – mixing (track 1)

== Charts ==
Chart (2014)	Peak position
Australian Hitseekers Albums (ARIA)	4
US Billboard 200	68

== Release history ==
Region	Date	Formats	Label	Ref.
Germany	3 October 2014	CD; digital download	Sony	
United States	7 October 2014	CD; digital download	RCA	
Australia	7 November 2014	CD; digital download	Sony	
