= Future Friends =

Debut studio album by Superfruit

Studio album / Compilation album by Superfruit
- Released: September 15, 2017
- Recorded: 2016–2017
- Genre: Synth-pop; electro house; power pop; dance-pop
- Length: 55:08
- Label: RCA
- Producer: Jussifer; Danny L Harle; Pretty Sister; Caitlin Notey; Brian Jones; SLATERS; Robopop; Daniel Crean; Shawn Wasabi; Valley Girl; NoiseClub; SOPHIE; Wendy Wang

Superfruit chronology
Future Friends – Part Two (2017)	Future Friends (2017)

Future Friends is the only studio album by American musical duo Superfruit. It was released on September 15, 2017 through RCA Records. The album is the latter release in the duo's Future Friends series that includes two extended plays, one released on June 30, 2017, and another released concurrently with the album. The album serves as a compilation album, containing the entire contents of both of the extended plays, a bonus track, and an additional remix not seen on either of the other releases. In 2021, the song 'GUY.exe' from the album went viral on TikTok as a challenge where people would show off their fit and muscular bodies.

== Track listing ==
No.	Title	Writer(s)	Producer(s)	Length
1.	"Imaginary Parties"	Al Carlson; Alex Craig; Mitch Grassi; Scott Hoying	SLATERS	3:14
2.	"Bad 4 Us"	Grassi; Hoying; Brian Robert Jones; Caitlin Notey	Notey; Jones	3:47
3.	"Worth It (Perfect)"	Grassi; Jakob Bjørn-Hansen; Danny L Harle; Hoying; Caroline Polachek	Danny L Harle	2:57
4.	"Vacation"	Grassi; Hoying; Jones; Notey	Notey; Jones	3:48
5.	"Sexy Ladies"	Grassi; Hoying; Zak Waters	Pretty Sister	3:36
6.	"Heartthrob"	Grassi; Hoying; Jesse Thomas; Daniel Omelio	Robopop	2:58
7.	"Future Friends"	Grassi; Hoying; Jussi Ilmari Karvinen; Katie Pearlman	Jussifer	3:23
8.	"How You Feeling?"	Grassi; Hoying; Shawn Wasabi; Justin Tranter; Daniel Crean	Crean; Wasabi	3:27
9.	"Hurry Up!"	Grassi; Hoying; Nate Campany; Kyle Shearer	Valley Girl	3:27
10.	"Deny U"	Grassi; Hoying; Karvinen; Polachek	Jussifer	3:26
11.	"Goodbye from Lonely"	Grassi; Hoying; Rob McCurdy; Christopher Petrosino	NoiseClub	3:51
12.	"GUY.exe"	Grassi; Hoying; Waters	Pretty Sister	3:42
13.	"Fantasy" (featuring Amber Liu)	Sarah Hudson; Harle; Sophie Xeon; John Hill; Liu	SOPHIE; Harle	3:32
14.	"Keep Me Coming"	Grassi; Hoying; Harle; Polachek	Harle	2:45
15.	"Everything" (featuring Inara George)	Grassi; Hoying; George; Wendy Wang	Wang	3:45
16.	"Future Friends" (Brian Robert Jones Choir Remix)	Grassi; Hoying; Karvinen; Pearlman	Jussifer	3:32
Total length:				55:08

== Charts ==
Chart (2017)	Peak position
Canadian Albums (Billboard)	70
US Billboard 200	29
