= Slow Dancing (EP) =

EP by Betty Who
- Released: April 8, 2014
- Genre: Synthpop; power pop
- Length: 20:34
- Label: RCA Records

Betty Who chronology
The Movement (2013)	Slow Dancing (2014)	Spotify Sessions (2014)

Singles from Slow Dancing
- 1. "Heartbreak Dream" Released: 18 February 2014

Slow Dancing is the second extended play by Australian-American pop singer, Betty Who. The extended play was released on 8 April 2014 and peaked at number 57 on the Billboard 200.

== Critical reception ==
Heather Phares from AllMusic gave the EP 4 out of 5, saying: "On Slow Dancing, Who seems capable of going in any direction and doing it well. Many artists might need an entire album to cover as much musical and emotional range as she does in these five songs, which spend equal time honing the sound she introduced on The Movement and showing she can do even more. The bouncy 'Alone Again' shows that her ever-so-slightly '80s-tinged sound has legs and never feels overly retro. Meanwhile, 'Heartbreak Dream' and 'Giving Me Away' walk the line between happy and heartbroken so skillfully that better-known artists like Katy Perry would love to call them their own. Who puts her spin on smooth R&B with 'Lovin Start,' which evokes her '80s and '90s inspirations as well as contemporaries like HAIM, while 'Silas,' an affecting acoustic ballad, reaffirms her voice sounds good in virtually any setting. Even though Slow Dancing ventures into more subdued territory than The Movement, it's just as triumphant and ramps up expectations for Betty Who's debut album."

== Slow Dancing Tour ==
Who announced a 22-date tour date on 3 February 2014.

- March 22: Philadelphia (Underground Arts)
- March 23: Washington (Rock & Roll Hotel)
- March 24: Nashville (The High Watt)
- March 26: Atlanta (Masquerade (Purgatory Stage))
- March 27: New Orleans (Hi Ho Lounge)
- March 28: Houston (Fitzgerald's)
- March 29: Dallas (Three Links)
- April 1: Los Angeles (Troubadour)
- April 2: San Francisco (Slims)
- April 4: Portland (Bunk Bar)
- April 5: Seattle (Barboza)
- April 6: Vancouver (The Media Club)
- April 8: Salt Lake City (Bar Deluxe)
- April 9: Denver (Larimer Lounge)
- April 10: Omaha (Waiting Room)
- April 11: Minneapolis (The Whole Music Club)
- April 12: Chicago (Lincoln Hall)
- April 14: Detroit (Magic Stick)
- April 15: Toronto (The Garrison)
- April 16: Brooklyn (Il Motore)
- April 17: Boston (Brighton Music Hall)
- April 18: Brooklyn (Music Hall of Williamsburg)

== Track listing ==
No.	Title	Writer(s)	Length
1.	"Heartbreak Dream"	Jess Newham; Peter Thomas	3:50
2.	"Alone Again"	Newham; Thomas	3:47
3.	"Giving Me Away"		3:57
4.	"Lovin' Start"		4:12
5.	"Silas"		4:48

All songs were included on the deluxe edition of Betty Who's debut album, Take Me When You Go (2014).

== Charts ==
Chart (2014)	Peak position
US Billboard 200	57
