= Widelife =

Canadian electronic music duo

- Origin: Toronto, Ontario, Canada
- Genres: Dance
- Years active: 2002–2005
- Labels: Nervous Records, Capitol
- Past members: Ian J. Nieman; Rachid Wehbi

Widelife is a Canadian electronic music songwriting and production team consisting of Ian J. Nieman and Rachid Wehbi. They are best known for their single "All Things (Just Keep Getting Better)", which was the theme song for the television show Queer Eye for the Straight Guy.

== History ==
Widelife collaborated with Thunderpuss on their release "Six Feet Under". They then released a single, "I Don't Want You", which topped Billboard magazine's Hot Dance Music/Club Play chart in October 2002.

The duo was soon asked to remix songs by Mariah Carey, Lamya, Deborah Cox, Soluna, and LeAnn Rimes. Their next writing and production effort, "Body (Reach Out)" with vocals by Faith Trent, also went to number 2 on the Billboard dance charts.

The duo composed the theme song for the television series Queer Eye for the Straight Guy, titled "All Things (Just Keep Getting Better)". Featuring Simone Denny on vocals, the track was released as the lead single from the soundtrack to the television series, reached number two on world dance charts, and peaked in the top 20 on the Australian singles chart in April 2004. The track was performed by the duo on The Tonight Show with Jay Leno and was also featured in the episode of South Park entitled "South Park Is Gay!".

Widelife later developed the theme music for the television shows Knock First and for Trio's "24 w/".

== Discography ==
=== Singles ===
Year	Single	Peak chart positions		Album
Year	Single	AUS	US Dance	Album
2001	"Six Feet Under"	—	—	Singles only
2002	"I Don't Want You"	—	1	Singles only
2002	"Body (Reach Out)"	—	2	Singles only
2003	"All Things (Just Keep Getting Better)"	12	5	Singles only
"—" denotes releases that did not chart

=== Remixes ===
Year	Single	Peak chart positions	Album
Year	Single	US Dance	Album
1998	"Faith Hill - This Kiss"	—	Remixes
2002	"Lamya - Empires"	1	Remixes
2002	"Deborah Cox - Mr. Lonely"	1	Remixes
2002	"Heather Headley - He Is"	4	Remixes
2002	"Thunderpuss - Head"	1	Remixes
2002	"Soluna - Mi Amor"	—	Remixes
2002	"LeAnn Rimes - Tic Toc"	10	Remixes
2002	"Suddenly"	—	Remixes
2003	"Rockik - Memories"	31	Remixes
2003	"You Got Me Movin'"	—	Remixes
2003	"LeAnn Rimes - We Can"	19	Remixes
2003	"Haru - Haru"	5	Remixes
2003	"Nelly Furtado - Powerless"	5	Remixes
2015	"Tori Kelly - Hollow"	3	Remixes
2021	"Mariah Carey - The One"	—	Remixes
"—" denotes releases that did not chart

== Awards ==
Widelife won a Juno Award in 2005 for "Dance Recording of the Year" for "All Things". Widelife was nominated for "Best Underground Dance Track" and "Best New Dance Artist Group" at the IDMA 31st Annual International Dance Music Awards.

== See also ==
- List of number-one dance hits (United States)
- List of artists who reached number one on the US Dance chart
