= All Things (Just Keep Getting Better) =

2003 single by Widelife

Single by Widelife and Simone Denny

from the album Queer Eye for the Straight Guy
- Released: June 2003
- Length: 2:45
- Label: Capitol
- Songwriters: Ian J Nieman; Rachid Wehbi
- Producers: Ian J Nieman; Rachid Wehbi

Widelife singles chronology
"Body (Reach Out)" (2002)	"All Things (Just Keep Getting Better)" (2003)

"All Things (Just Keep Getting Better)" is a song composed by Canadian electronic music production team Widelife with Simone Denny of Love Inc. on vocals. It was the theme song for the television series Queer Eye for the Straight Guy and was an official song of the 2021 CONCACAF Gold Cup.

== Release ==
Released as the lead single for the Queer Eye soundtrack, the song peaked at number five on the US Billboard Dance Club Play chart and number 12 in Australia, where it was the 13th-most-successful dance hit of 2004.

Widelife performed this single on The Tonight Show with Jay Leno. The song was officially remixed by HQ2 (Hex Hector & Mac Quayle), Barry Harris, and Jason Nevins, and appeared in an episode of South Park, titled "South Park Is Gay!".

== Accolades ==
In 2005, Widelife won the Juno Award for Dance Recording of the Year for "All Things".

== Track listings ==
Australasian CD single

1. "All Things (Just Keep Getting Better)" (original version) – 2:45
2. "All Things (Just Keep Getting Better)" (H2Q club mix) – 7:32
3. "All Things (Just Keep Getting Better)" (Jason Nevins Big Room remix) – 9:30
4. "All Things (Just Keep Getting Better)" (Jason Nevins Hands Up mix) – 6:42
5. "All Things (Just Keep Getting Better)" (Barry Harris Club Interpretation mix) – 9:28

== Credits and personnel ==
Credits are taken from the US promo CD liner notes.

Studio

- Mixed at Townhouse Studios (London, England)

Personnel

- Ian J Nieman, Rachid Wehbi – writing, production
- Widelife – recording
- Jeremy Wheatley – additional production, mixing
- Giulio Pierucci – additional programming
- Rob Eric – executive production

== Charts ==
=== Weekly charts ===
Chart (2004)	Peak position
Australia (ARIA)	12
Australian Dance (ARIA)	1
US Dance Club Play (Billboard)	5
US Dance Radio Airplay (Billboard)	7
US Dance Singles Sales (Billboard)	25

=== Year-end charts ===
Chart (2004)	Position
Australian Dance (ARIA)	13

== Release history ==
Region	Date	Format(s)	Label(s)	Ref.
United States	June 2003	12-inch vinyl	Capitol	
Australia	22 March 2004	CD	Capitol	

== Betty Who version ==
In 2018, a remixed version by Betty Who was released as the theme song for season two of the Netflix reboot, Queer Eye; however, it was never actually used in any episodes. A music video was released featuring the cast of Queer Eye, Jonathan Van Ness, Karamo Brown, Antoni Porowski, Bobby Berk, and Tan France.
