= Heartbreak Dream =

Single by Betty Who

from the EP Slow Dancing, and Worlds Apart and the album Take Me When You Go
- B-side: "Somebody Loves You" (acoustic)
- Released: 18 February 2014
- Genre: Synth-pop; pop
- Length: 3:50
- Label: RCA
- Songwriter(s): Betty Who; Peter Thomas
- Producer(s): Peter Thomas

Betty Who singles chronology
"Somebody Loves You" (2012)	"Heartbreak Dream" (2014)	"All of You" (2015)

Music video
- "Heartbreak Dream" on YouTube

"Heartbreak Dream" is the song by Australian recording artist Betty Who. It was released on 18 February 2014 with a limited edition CD single in North America in April 2014 as the lead single from her second extended play, Slow Dancing (2014), her third extended play, Worlds Apart (2015), and her debut studio album, Take Me When You Go (2014). The song is used over the end credits of the 2015 film Pitch Perfect 2.

Who describes "Heartbreak Dream" as being about "the kind of relationship that you probably should end but for some reason [you can’t]."

== Music video ==
The music video was released on 2 April 2014. It features Who in concert and interacting with fans.

== Critical reception ==
Jamieson Cox from Entertainment Time said; "There’s a remarkable density and confidence to “Heartbreak Dream”: Who applies layers and layers of hooks like a cake decorator with a heavy fondant hand, but trusts in her voice to soar above the fray. In a remarkable show of personality, it does: she’s tender and tough in equal measure, balancing defiance and reflection on a relationship that’s souring. It’s tough to draw complex situations with nuance and depth over the course of a four-minute pop song, but Who makes it look easy with “Heartbreak Dream” — this is another strong effort from a star in the making."

Josh Terry of Consequence of Sound said; "While the song deals with the unromantic and complex sides to relationships, it manages to wrap its sense of melancholy in bouncing pop euphoria."

Robbie Daw from Idolator said; "Is it possible for a song about heartbreak to sound this upbeat? Betty Who makes it seem effortless."

Nic Kelly from Project U (in a review of the extended play) said "'Heartbreak Dream' follows the single 'Somebody Loves You' in its size and romanticism. It’s real ‘close the curtains, make sure the door’s locked and jump around your room singing it’ stuff. 'In a moment, you were everything to me. In this moment, we’re living in a heartbreak dream,' Betty wails over a massive pop jam which would stand an entire Allphones Arena up to sing and dance along."

== Track listings ==
Digital download

1. "Heartbreak Dream" – 3:50

Limited edition CD single(RCA – 088843-04577-7)

1. "Heartbreak Dream"
2. "Somebody Loves You" (Acoustic)
