= The Valley (Betty Who album) =

Studio album by Betty Who
- Released: 24 March 2017
- Recorded: 2015–2017
- Studio: Henson Recordings Studios, Hollywood, California; Peter Thomas Home Studio; Sucasa Recording Studios, Sherman Oaks, California; The Pool House, Los Angeles, California
- Genre: Pop
- Length: 44:10
- Label: RCA
- Producer: Peter Thomas; Pretty Sister; Pop & Oak; Trevor Brown; Zaire Koalo; Oliver "Oligee" Goldstein; Vaughn Oliver; CJ Baran; Kyle Moorman; The Monsters & Strangerz; Mstr Rogers; Robopop

Betty Who chronology
Take Me When You Go (2014)	The Valley (2017)	Betty, Pt. 1 (2018)

Singles from The Valley
- 1. "I Love You Always Forever" Released: 3 June 2016; 2. "Human Touch" Released: 11 November 2016; 3. "Some Kinda Wonderful" Released: 3 February 2017; 4. "You Can Cry Tomorrow" Released: 3 March 2017; 5. "Mama Say" Released: 17 March 2017

The Valley is the second studio album by Australian-American singer Betty Who, released on 24 March 2017 by RCA Records. The album is preceded by the singles "I Love You Always Forever", "Human Touch", "Some Kinda Wonderful", "You Can Cry Tomorrow", and "Mama Say".

== Background and recording ==
On 3 June 2016, Who released a cover of Donna Lewis' hit 1996 single "I Love You Always Forever", produced by her frequent collaborator and former schoolmate Peter Thomas. Who's cover was recorded after being encouraged by a record label executive, mentioned in conversation after rediscovering the original version a few years prior. When asked as if this was the first offering from her upcoming second studio album, she commented "I was desperate to put out new music and it is really a kind of exhausting and sometimes impossibly-busy process to try and get a song out into the world. ‘I Love You Always Forever’ was sort of like a peace offering...", implying that it was a release independent from the album. However, this proved false when the album's track listing was made available and the song was included. The song charted within the top ten of the ARIA Charts, and peaked at number one on the Australian RadioCheck chart and the Billboard US Dance Club Songs chart.

In November 2016, Who released the album's proper first single, "Human Touch", and for the next several months, teased the album's release in several interviews with different media outlets. In a December interview with Billboard magazine, she revealed the album featured production from new collaborators like Australian songwriter Robopop, American duo Pop & Oak, and Mstr Rogers, among others. A month later, on 30 January 2017, the album's official title, The Valley, was announced in conjunction with the album's supporting tour, the Party in the Valley Tour. The album and the tour were also announced alongside the album's second single, "Some Kinda Wonderful", the video for which she was seen shooting in the days preceding the announcement.

== Reception ==
Heather Phares from AllMusic gave the album three-and-a-half out of five stars and felt that "The Valley is a closer fit with the mainstream pop landscape of the 2010s than anything she's done before", adding "The album's best moments let her emotive, expressive singing shine on songs that are all the more joyous because they're so relatable, whether it's the breakup recovery anthem 'You Can Cry Tomorrow' or the celebratory Superfruit collaboration 'Beautiful'".

David from AuspOp gave the album 4 out to 5, writing that "It's obvious to me hearing her music that she is a classically trained musician. There is considered attention to the underpinnings of each song." David praised "Mama Say" for "mixing pop with '80s synths and fun lyrics", described "Wanna Be" as Who "wishing she was with someone who is taken" and opined that "Blue Heaven Midnight Crush" could be "pulled straight out of a movie from the '80s", adding Who is "immensely talented".

Mac McNaughton from The Music gave the album 3 out of 5 saying the album is “Glistening with pop polish” and complimented "Free to Fly".

== Track listing ==
No.	Title	Writer(s)	Producer(s)	Length
1.	"The Valley"	Jessica Anne Newham	Betty Who^{[c]}	1:28
2.	"Some Kinda Wonderful"	Newham; Warren "Oak" Felder; Trevor Brown; William Simmons	Oak; Trevorious^{[a]}; Zaire Koalo^{[a]}	3:13
3.	"You Can Cry Tomorrow"	Newham; Oliver Goldstein; Vaughn Oliver; Peter Thomas; Zak Waters	Oliver; Thomas^{[a]}	3:52
4.	"Mama Say"	Newham; Thomas; Christopher J Baran; Fransisca Hall	Thomas; CJ Baran; Kuk Harrell^{[c]}	3:11
5.	"Human Touch"	Newham; Thomas; Kyle Moorman	Thomas; Moorman	3:33
6.	"Free to Fly" (featuring Warren G)	Newham; Waters; Justin Tranter; Warren Griffin III; Raymond Grigsby; Sean Paul Joseph; Cedric Leonard; Craig Love; Robert McDowell; Jonathan Smith	Pretty Sister; Thomas^{[b]}; Emily Wright^{[c]}	3:22
7.	"Wanna Be"	Newham; Thomas; Alexandra Tamposi	Thomas; Wright^{[c]}	3:30
8.	"Pretend You're Missing Me"	Newham; Waters; Jordan Johnson; Stefan Johnson; Marcus Lomax; Thomas Eriksen	The Monsters & Strangerz	3:56
9.	"Blue Heaven Midnight Crush"	Newham; Jarrad Rogers; Hall	Mstr Rogers; Wright^{[c]}	3:39
10.	"Make You Memories"	Newham; Thomas; Waters; Tranter	Thomas; Pretty Sister; Wright^{[c]}	3:25
11.	"Reunion"	Newham; Daniel Omeilo; Thomas	Thomas; Robopop; Wright^{[c]}	3:46
12.	"Beautiful" (featuring Superfruit)	Newham; Waters	Pretty Sister	3:33
13.	"I Love You Always Forever"	Donna Lewis	Thomas	3:42
Total length:				44:10

Notes

- ^{^[a]} signifies a co-producer
- ^{^[b]} signifies an additional producer
- ^{^[c]} signifies a vocal producer

== Charts ==
Chart performance for The Valley
Chart (2017)	Peak position
Australian Albums (ARIA)	58
US Billboard 200	105
