= Betty Who =

Australian musician (born 1991)

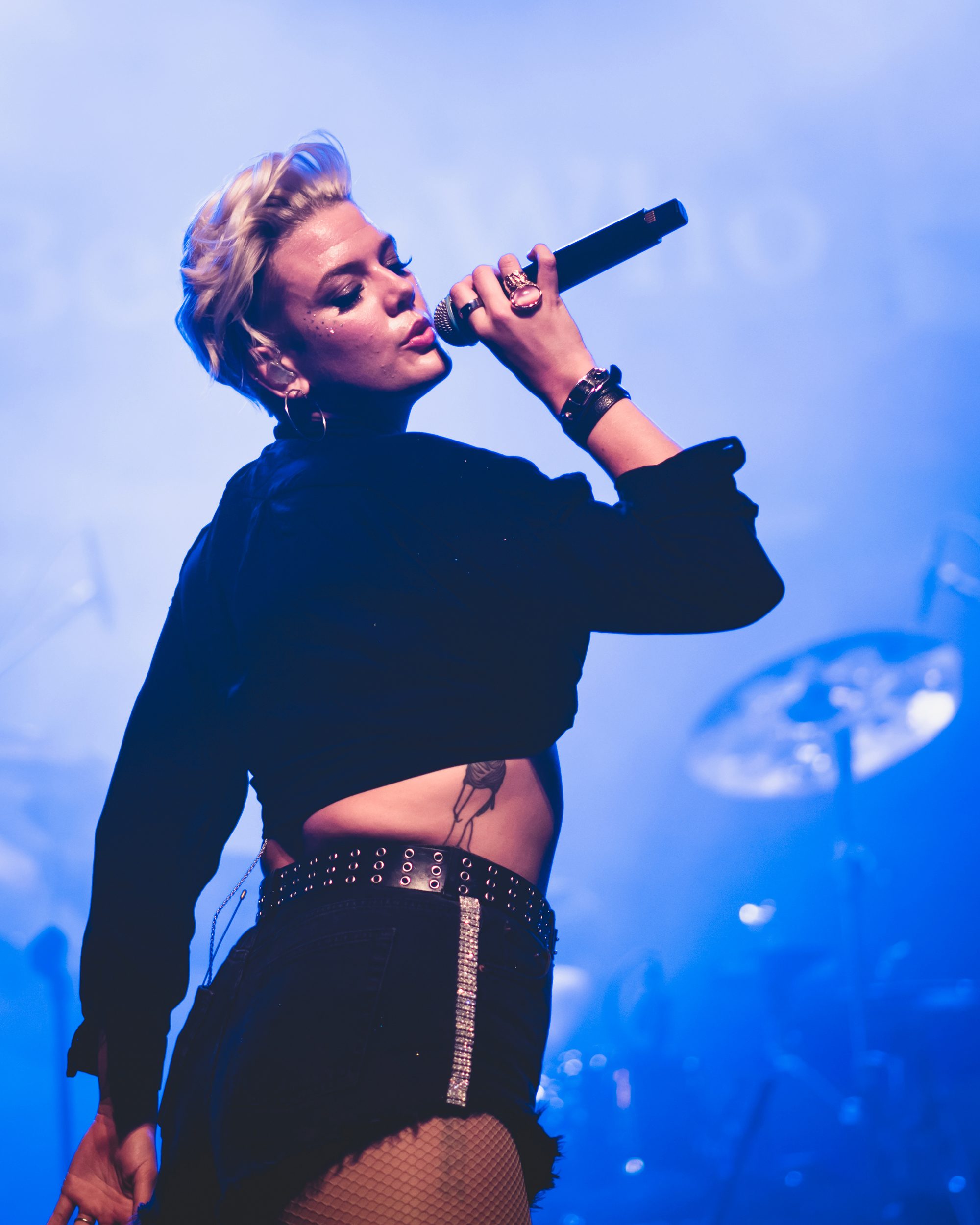
- Betty Who in 2019

Background information
- Born: Jessica Anne Newham; 5 October 1991 (age 35); Sydney, New South Wales, Australia
- Genres: Pop; dance-pop; synth-pop; electropop
- Occupations: Musician; singer; songwriter
- Instruments: Vocals; keyboard; guitar; cello
- Years active: 2010–present
- Labels: RCA; AWAL; BMG Rights Management
- Website: www.bettywhomusic.com

Jessica Anne Newham (born 5 October 1991), known by her stage name Betty Who, is an Australian musician and singer. After independently releasing her debut single, "Somebody Loves You" (2012), and her debut extended play, The Movement (2013), she signed with RCA Records and later released her debut studio album, Take Me When You Go (2014). Her second studio album, The Valley (2017), saw the commercial success of her cover of "I Love You Always Forever", which peaked inside the top ten in Australia and reached the top of the Billboard Dance Club Songs chart in the United States.

Who made her Broadway debut in Hadestown at the Walter Kerr Theater on 5 September 2023. She played the role of Persephone until 4 February 2024.

In 2024, she is a guest star from the children's television in Yo Gabba Gabbaland and played the character of the Wind and performed the song, I am the Wind.

== Early life ==
Jessica Anne Newham was born in Sydney, Australia, where she lived until her mid-teens. Trained since the age of four as a cellist, she moved to the United States in 2007 to attend Interlochen Center for the Arts in Michigan.

Newham is also self-taught on piano and guitar, wrote her first songs at age 14, and began performing as a singer-songwriter two years later. Her stage name comes from the title of a song she composed at age 16 about unrequited love.

After school at Ascham in Sydney and Frensham in the Southern Highlands, NSW, Newham attended Berklee College of Music in Boston. During her first semester, she met producer Peter Thomas who was also attending Berklee. Thomas suggested pairing Newham's songwriting with a more dreamy, anthemic production style. The two began writing new material together and developed Newham's sound over the next two years.

== Career ==
=== 2010–2013: Career beginnings, "Somebody Loves You" and The Movement ===
As Betty Who, Newham's debut single "Somebody Loves You" was initially released independently as a free download, and was premiered by pop music blogger and at-the-time official Grammy blogger Arjan Writes on 30 November 2012. Co-written by Newham and Thomas, and produced by Thomas, the song garnered immediate praise, spreading quickly online and being featured by other well-known outlets including Socialite Life, Pop on And On, and Popservations. A music video, directed by Evan Savitt, was released on 22 January 2013, and an official remix by acclaimed indie pop producer FM Attack was released on 11 March 2013.

Newham's debut EP, The Movement, was released on 17 April 2013. An independent, free-download release initially, the EP's huge success online helped lead to a large amount of major label interest, before she ultimately signed with RCA Records. It premiered on Billboard on 9 April 2013, one week prior to its official release date.

On 11 September 2013, Spencer Stout uploaded a YouTube video of him proposing to his boyfriend Dustin in a flash mob dance routine at a Salt Lake City, Utah Home Depot. The video, which featured "Somebody Loves You" became a viral hit online. The attention of the video coupled with the track's official iTunes release, led to the song debuting at number 44 on the overall iTunes Charts, as well as debuting as the number 4 most viral song on Spotify.

Who signed to RCA Records on 15 September 2013.

=== 2014–2017: Take Me When You Go and The Valley ===
On 8 March 2014, "Somebody Loves You" reached number one on Billboard's Dance/Club Play Songs chart.

In April 2014, Who released her second EP, Slow Dancing, which made it to number one on the iTunes pop music charts. The first single from that EP, titled "Heartbreak Dream", was released on iTunes and Google Play on 18 February 2014. The song is used over the end credits of the 2015 film Pitch Perfect 2.

Who has praised Katy Perry, Robyn and Miley Cyrus as influences. She told Variance Magazine in 2014 that they "make pop that's generational. They're making the pop music of our generation that's going to stick around. People are going to look back and be like, 'Oh my God, it's Robyn's Body Talk album. That's one of the best pop albums of the last 10 years.'" Who supported Katy Perry and Kylie Minogue on part of the Australia leg of The Prismatic World Tour and Kiss Me Once Tour respectively. In 2014, Who made her American television debut when she performed "Somebody Loves You" on Watch What Happens: Live.

In late August 2014, Who made the announcement that her full-length debut album, Take Me When You Go, would be released on 7 October 2014. She also released the track list with the announcement. Thirteen songs, four of them being taken from her previous EPs, appeared on the album. From the album, the track "All of You" was her second number one on the US Dance chart, peaking at number one on 21 February 2015.

On 3 June 2016, Who released a cover of Donna Lewis' "I Love You Always Forever". It became her third number one on the Billboard Dance Club Songs chart, and proved to be her breakthrough hit in Australia, reaching number 6 on the ARIA Singles Chart.

On 24 March 2017, Who's second album, The Valley was released.

=== 2018–2020: Betty ===
On 19 January 2018, Who released "Ignore Me", which is Who's first single as an independent artist, after parting in 2017 with RCA Records. On 16 February 2018, the singer released a cover of Kylie Minogue's "Come Into My World" for Made in Australia compilation by Amazon Music. In 2018, Who released a remixed version of Widelife's "All Things (Just Keep Getting Better)" to be used as the theme song for season two of the Netflix reboot Queer Eye. A music video was released featuring the cast of Queer Eye and Who.

On 15 June 2018, Betty, Pt. 1, Who's third EP, was released containing the singles "Ignore Me", "Look Back" and "Taste" as well as two other previously unreleased songs: "Just Thought You Should Know" and "Friend Like Me".

On 14 November 2018, "Between You & Me" was released as another new single. It was the first single from the new album Betty that had not been previously released on the Betty, Pt 1 EP. With the release of this single, Betty Who used different shades of blue and photos of herself on her social media profiles to release lyrics to the song. The lyrics that were revealed were "You've got one hand on the wheel", "Sitting at the red light, tensions are high, vibe you could cut with a knife", and "just between you & me, I can feel something here, wondering if you do too". An Instagram post by Betty Who on the day after the release showed that the single already had 22,310 streams on Spotify, and had risen to 31,000 streams two hours later. By 12 December 2018, streams had surpassed 500,000. The music video for this song dropped on 28 November 2018, in which Betty Who plays herself as well as her own love interest. On 10 January 2019, "I Remember" was released as the fifth single from the album, with the music video for the song being released on 24 January.

In June 2020, she launched a Patreon to fund new music and give fans access to exclusive content. That September, Who made her acting debut in the comedy-drama film Unpregnant portraying Kira Matthews, a character she described as "a totally badass, confident and queer race car driver".

=== 2022-present: The One That Got Away and Big! ===
In May 2022, it was revealed that Who would be making her reality TV debut by hosting the new dating show The One That Got Away. Produced by Amazon Studios and Fulwell 73 and executive produced by Elan Gale, the series is set to premiere on 24 June 2022. The show is a time-traveling, experimental dating series where six people searching for their soulmates are given the chance to explore a lifetime of missed connections as, one by one, people from their pasts enter through "The Portal" to surprise them and take their shot at love.

On 3 June 2022, Who released her first single in over two years titled "Blow Out My Candle". The music video, directed by Tyler Cunningham, made its broadcast premiere on MTV and finds Who embracing the '80s aesthetic as she dances around in a Jamie Lee Curtis-inspired workout leotard, sweatband, and high socks as she sings about self confidence and love. Speaking of the delay in her return due to the COVID-19 pandemic, Who stated: "It's been a long couple years for all of us. 'Blow Out My Candle' is the story I want to share most. The feeling I held onto in the darkest moments of the last couple years." The song is the lead single to her upcoming fourth studio album, set for release in late 2022. Big! followed later in the year.

On 5 September 2023, she made her Broadway debut in the musical Hadestown as Persephone.

== Artistry ==
Who is an alto, whose vocal delivery has been described as "breathy". As a multi-instrumentalist, she has played cello, piano, and guitar since childhood, having taught herself the latter two. Several critics have noted that Who's work is heavily influenced by 1980s music. The singer admitted she is strongly biased towards "big-sounding 1980s synth-pop", a sound she cultivated with songwriting-producing partner Peter Thomas. The Phoenix New Times music critic Benjamin Leatherman described Who as equally "influenced by ’80s synth music and ’90s dance-pop as she is by the maximalist production style of Max Martin". AllMusic biographer Heather Phares said the singer "makes big-hearted pop music" while "Borrowing sounds and styles from the '80s onward and putting her own joyous stamp on them". The artist has described her songwriting method as "taking influences from [past] music and mixing it in with the emotions I’m actually living through". Who has also cited 1990s pop acts such as Britney Spears and the Backstreet Boys as musical influences. PopMatters' Evan Sawdey summarized her work as "a streamlined, full-pastel celebration of her favorite dance-pop idols".

Who is primarily a pop, dance-pop, and synth-pop singer, which starkly contrasts her classical music training. CBS News described her debut album, Take Me When You Go, as a combination of "dance hits, love songs and ballads – all with a hint of synthesizer, drums and keyboard", whereas Betty was her most diverse body of work upon its release. Josh Rogosin of NPR, who served as audio engineer for Who's Tiny Desk Concert in 2019, observed that "When all the studio production is stripped away, what's left are intricate melodies that soar through Betty's impressive vocal range and relatable lyrics". According to Sam Lansky of Idolator, she frequently combines heartbreaking lyrics with infectious melodies, spunk, and "massive" hooks. Who's artistry has been compared to the works of female artists such as Cyndi Lauper, Robyn, Pink, Katy Perry, Madonna, and Whitney Houston, with Houston's death in 2012 inspiring the writing of her debut single, "Somebody Loves You". Who has also cited Joni Mitchell and Carole King as songwriting influences, as well as singer-songwriters Missy Higgins and Ingrid Michaelson. She recalled that early in her career, she was criticized as unoriginal for closely resembling Pink, and noted that female artists are often held to an expectation of originality that male artists are not.

Who's output has been generally acclaimed by music critics and the press. In 2013, Lansky hailed her as "the next great pop star", before she had released a full-length album. Following her successful debut, in 2014 Edward Helmore of The Guardian hailed Who as "the latest bright young thing to provide a lesson in how to construct a career with few of the conventional components", describing her as "a singer whose talent and following has come naturally, rather than under the direction of a pop Svengali or management team that oversees every tweet or Instagram picture". Meanwhile, music consultant Andy Gershon labeled her "an accidental pop star" due to her perceived authenticity and way in which she initially established a strong following and fanbase with little involvement from a record company. Comparing her public profile and potential to that of dance-pop contemporary Carly Rae Jepsen, Sawdey observed that Who continues to fall short of mainstream success despite positive reviews and constantly selling out smaller venues, describing her as "a guilty pop secret that only a select few knew about".

Who cites actress Marilyn Monroe as one of her main fashion inspirations, crediting her size with helping her appreciate her own body type.

== Personal life ==
Who describes herself as a "queer, bisexual". In 2014, Who began dating photographer Zak Cassar, son of director and producer Jon Cassar. The couple announced their engagement on 21 November 2017. They were married in 2020. Who is a dual citizen of Australia and the United States. In 2025 Who came out as non-binary. Her comments about Renée Rapp sparked backlash and were widely criticised, with multiple outlets and commentators describing them as lesbophobic.

== Discography ==
=== Studio albums ===
List of studio albums, with selected chart positions and certifications
Title	Album details	Peak chart positions		
Title	Album details	AUS	US	US Indie
Take Me When You Go	Released: 3 October 2014; Label: RCA; Formats: CD, digital download	— (Note: Take Me When You Go did not chart in the top 100 of the Australian albums chart, but reached number 4 on the Hitseekers albums chart.)	68	—
The Valley	Released: 24 March 2017; Label: RCA; Formats: CD, digital download, LP	58	105	—
Betty	Released: 15 February 2019; Label: AWAL; Formats: CD, Digital download, LP	—	— (Note: Betty did not chart on the Billboard 200, but peaked at number 86 on the Top Current Albums chart.)	24
Big!	Released: 14 October 2022; Label: BMG; Formats: CD, Digital download, LP	—	—	—
"—" denotes releases that did not chart or were not released in that territory.

=== Extended plays ===
Title	Details	Peak chart positions	
Title	Details	US	US Heat.
The Movement	Released: 16 April 2013 (independent); Re-released: 17 September 2013 (RCA); Label: RCA, Sony Music Entertainment; Format: Digital download	—	22
Slow Dancing	Released: 8 April 2014; Label: RCA, Sony Music Entertainment; Format: Digital download	57	— (Note: Since Take Me When You Go charted in the top 100 of the Billboard 200 in 2014 all of Who's subsequent releases are ineligible for the Heatseekers Albums chart.)
Spotify Sessions	Released: 6 June 2014; Label: RCA Records / Sony Music Entertainment; Format: Streaming	—	—
Worlds Apart	Released: 23 June 2014 (United Kingdom); Label: RCA / Sony Music Entertainment; Format: Digital download	—	—
Betty, Pt. 1	Released: 15 June 2018; Label: AWAL; Format: Digital download	—	—
Love Yourself	Released: 7 November 2025; Label: Betty Who; Format: Digital download	—	—

=== Singles ===
==== As lead artist ====
Singles as lead artist, showing year released and album name
Title	Year	Peak chart positions				Certifications	Album
Title	Year	AUS	NZ	US Bub.	US Dance	Certifications	Album
"Somebody Loves You"	2012	—	—	16	1		The Movement and Take Me When You Go
"Heartbreak Dream"	2014	—	—	—	—		Slow Dancing, Worlds Apart, and Take Me When You Go
"All of You"	2015	—	—	—	1		Take Me When You Go
"I Love You Always Forever"	2016	6	33	—	1	ARIA: 2× Platinum	The Valley
"Human Touch"	2016	—	—	—	—		The Valley
"Some Kinda Wonderful"	2017	—	—	—	—		The Valley
"You Can Cry Tomorrow"	2017	—	—	—	—		The Valley
"Mama Say"	2017	—	—	—	—		The Valley
"If You're Hearing This" (with Hook N Sling & Parson James)	2017	—	—	—	—		Non-album single
"Ignore Me"	2018	—	—	—	—		Betty, Pt. 1 and Betty
"Look Back"	2018	—	—	—	—		Betty, Pt. 1
"Taste"	2018	—	—	—	—		Betty, Pt. 1 and Betty
"All Things (Just Keep Getting Better)" (from Queer Eye)	2018	—	—	—	—		Non-album singles
"The Other Side" (from Sierra Burgess Is a Loser)	2018	—	—	—	—		Non-album singles
"Between You & Me"	2018	—	—	—	—		Betty
"I Remember"	2019	—	—	—	—		Betty
"Merry Christmas, Happy Holidays"	2020	—	—	—	—		Non-album single
"Blow Out My Candle"	2022	—	—	—	—		Big!
"She Can Dance" (solo or Brabo remix featuring Pabllo Vittar)	2022	—	—	—	—		Big!
"Big"	2022	—	—	—	—		Big!
"Running Up That Hill"	2023	—	—	—	—		Non-album single
"Run!"	2025	—	—	—	—		Love Yourself
"Sweat"	2025	—	—	—	—		Love Yourself
"Fabulous"	2025	—	—	—	—		Love Yourself
"—" denotes a single that failed to chart.

==== As featured artist ====
Singles as lead artist, showing year released and album name
Title	Year	Album
"Heaven" (Troye Sivan featuring Betty Who)	2016	Blue Neighbourhood
"Rocket Girl" (Lemaitre featuring Betty Who)	2018	Non-album single
"Dust" (Matt Simons featuring Betty Who)	2019	After the Landslide
"Lovely" (Fly By Midnight featuring Betty Who)	2019	Happy About Everything Else...
"End of My Rope" (MisterWives featuring Betty Who)	2024	Nosebleeds: Encore

=== Album appearances ===
Title	Year	Album	Other artist(s)
"Heartbreak Dream"	2015	Pitch Perfect 2 (Special edition)	—N/a
"Higher"	2018	Future	Don Diablo
"The Other Side"	2018	Sierra Burgess Is a Loser	—N/a
"Easy"	2018	Samurai Sessions Vol. 3	Miyavi, RAC

=== Remixes ===
Title	Year	Artist
"Neon Lights"	2013	Demi Lovato

=== Music videos ===
Title	Year	Director
"Somebody Loves You"	2013	Evan Savitt
"Heartbreak Dream"	2014	
"Somebody Loves You" (New version)	2014	
"All of You"	2015	
"I Love You Always Forever"	2016	
"Human Touch" (acoustic version) (featuring Jarryd James)	2016	George Sloan
"Some Kinda Wonderful"	2017	
"Mama Say"	2017	
"Human Touch"	2017	
"Human Touch" (To the Beat with Kurt Hugo Schneider)	2017	
"Ignore Me"	2018	Mark McCune & Mariana McCune
"Taste"	2018	Jake Wilson
"Between You & Me"	2018	
"I Remember"	2019	Jake Wilson
"Just Thought You Should Know" (stripped version)	2019	
"The One"	2020	
"Blow Out My Candle"	2022	Tyler Cunningham
"She Can Dance"	2022	Aerin Moreno

== Awards ==
Year	Association	Category	Nominated work	Result
2014	NewNowNext Awards	Best New Musician	Herself	Won

== See also ==
- List of number-one dance hits (United States)
- List of artists who reached number one on the US Dance chart
