= All of You (Betty Who song) =

Single by Betty Who

from the album Take Me When You Go
- Released: 10 March 2015
- Recorded: 2013
- Genre: Dance-pop
- Length: 3:58
- Label: RCA Records
- Songwriter(s): Betty Who, Peter Thomas
- Producer(s): Peter Thomas

Betty Who singles chronology
| "Heartbreak Dream" (2014) | "All of You" (2015) | "I Love You Always Forever" (2016) |

Music video
- "All of You" on YouTube

"All of You" is a song by Australian recording artist Betty Who. The song first appeared on SoundCloud in December 2013, and was later re-recorded and included on her debut studio album, Take Me When You Go (2014). The video was released in January 2015 and a remix single on 10 March 2015.

On 21 February 2015, "All of You" became Who's second number one single on the Billboard Dance/Club Play Songs chart.

== Critical reception ==
Sam Lansky from Idolator said "All of You" is “a deliriously euphoric dance-pop gem that rushes and crashes gloriously”.

== Music videos ==
A music video for "All of You" was released on YouTube on 8 January 2015.

== Track listings ==
2015 remixes

1. "All of You" (Hector Fonseca Remix) – 5:11
2. "All of You" (Wideboys Remix) – 3:25
3. "All of You" (The Jane Doze Remix radio edit) – 3:45
4. "All of You" (The Love Club Remix) – 5:02
5. "All of You" (Shèmce Remix) – 5:21

== Charts ==
| Chart (2015) | Peak position |
|---|---|
| US Dance Club Songs (Billboard) | 1 |
