= Human Touch (Betty Who song) =

Single by Betty Who

from the album The Valley
- Released: 11 November 2016
- Recorded: 2015–16
- Genre: Pop; dance; electropop; tropical pop
- Length: 3:34
- Label: RCA
- Songwriter(s): Betty Who; Peter Thomas; Kyle Moorman
- Producer(s): Peter Thomas; Kyle Moorman

Betty Who singles chronology
"Heaven" (2016)	"Human Touch" (2016)	"Some Kinda Wonderful" (2017)

"Human Touch" is a song by Australian singer and songwriter Betty Who, released by RCA Records as the second single from her second studio album, The Valley, on 11 November 2016. The music video for the song was released on July 18, 2017.

== Background ==
Who stated that she did not originally like the track when she first wrote it, adding that multiple versions of the song were created during its development ("about 100"), leading her to stepping away from it for a few months. She later added that it is one of her favourite songs on The Valley and "the thing [she looks] the most forward to during any show". "Human Touch" was made available for digital download and streaming as The Valley's second single on 11 November 2016.

== Composition and lyrics ==
"Human Touch" is a "Major Lazer-style" pop, dance, and electropop track with a "soaring" chorus and a BPM of 103. It has been described as "relatable" and "excessively fun" and compared to works of Justin Bieber and The Chainsmokers. Lyrically, it talks about "the thrill of touch with an on-again, off-again flame" and "post-breakup sex".

== Music video ==
The single's music video, directed and choreographed by Khasan Brailsford, premiered on 18 July 2017. In it, "the Australian singer turns the bedroom into a dancefloor with some fierce moves". Who also talked to Entertainment Weekly, saying "I had so much fun dancing with the most gorgeous men in the world AND getting to play dress up. There are wigs. And abs. What more could I have asked for? This shoot was a blast and I’m so excited to see what people think!"
