= The Movement (EP) =

EP by Betty Who
- Released: April 16, 2013; September 17, 2013 (re-release)
- Genre: Synth-pop; power pop
- Length: 15:24
- Label: Self-released; RCA (re-release)

Betty Who chronology
The Movement (2013)	Slow Dancing (2014)

Singles from The Movement
- 1. "Somebody Loves You" Released: 30 November 2012

The Movement is the debut extended play (EP) by Australian-American singer-songwriter Betty Who. The EP was self-released on 16 April 2013 as a free download.

The EP received favorable reviews from several magazines and blogs upon release. Idolator described the EP as "A spine-tinglingly euphoric 80's pop nugget," Indie pop blog All Things Go claimed she was "charting new musical territory," and the UK outlet Popjustice called it "the best proper EP so far of 2013." Elle Magazine named her "Your Next Pop Obsession" on 5 August 2013, and TIME chose Newham as one of 14 Musical Acts To Watch in 2014.

On 15 September 2013, it was announced Who had signed with RCA Records. The EP was re-released digitally via RCA Records on 17 September 2013.

== Reviews ==
Sam Lanky of Idolator gave the EP a positive review saying; "The four-track EP is led by single "Somebody Loves You," a spine-tinglingly euphoric '80s pop nugget with a singalong chorus catchier than most of what's on mainstream radio. Weirder still is that the other three tracks are equally impressive: The luminous "You're In Love" evokes the new Tegan and Sara album, while "Right Here" is dreamily lush; "High Society" is an injection of New Order synth-pop with a rich, cinematic chorus. It's absolutely perfect pop, and it's absolutely - incredibly! - free".

== Track listing ==
All production done by Peter Thomas.

No.	Title	Writer(s)	Length
1.	"Somebody Loves You"	Jessica Newham; Peter Thomas	3:37
2.	"You're in Love"	Newham; Thomas	3:55
3.	"Right Here"	Newham; April Bender	4:00
4.	"High Society"	Newham; Thomas	3:52
Total length:			15:24

All songs were included on the deluxe edition of Betty Who's debut album, Take Me When You Go (2014).

== Charts ==
The extended play debuted at number 22 on the Billboard Heatseekers Album chart for the week commencing 26 April 2014.

Chart (2014)	Peak position
US Heatseekers Albums	22
