= Måneskin discography =

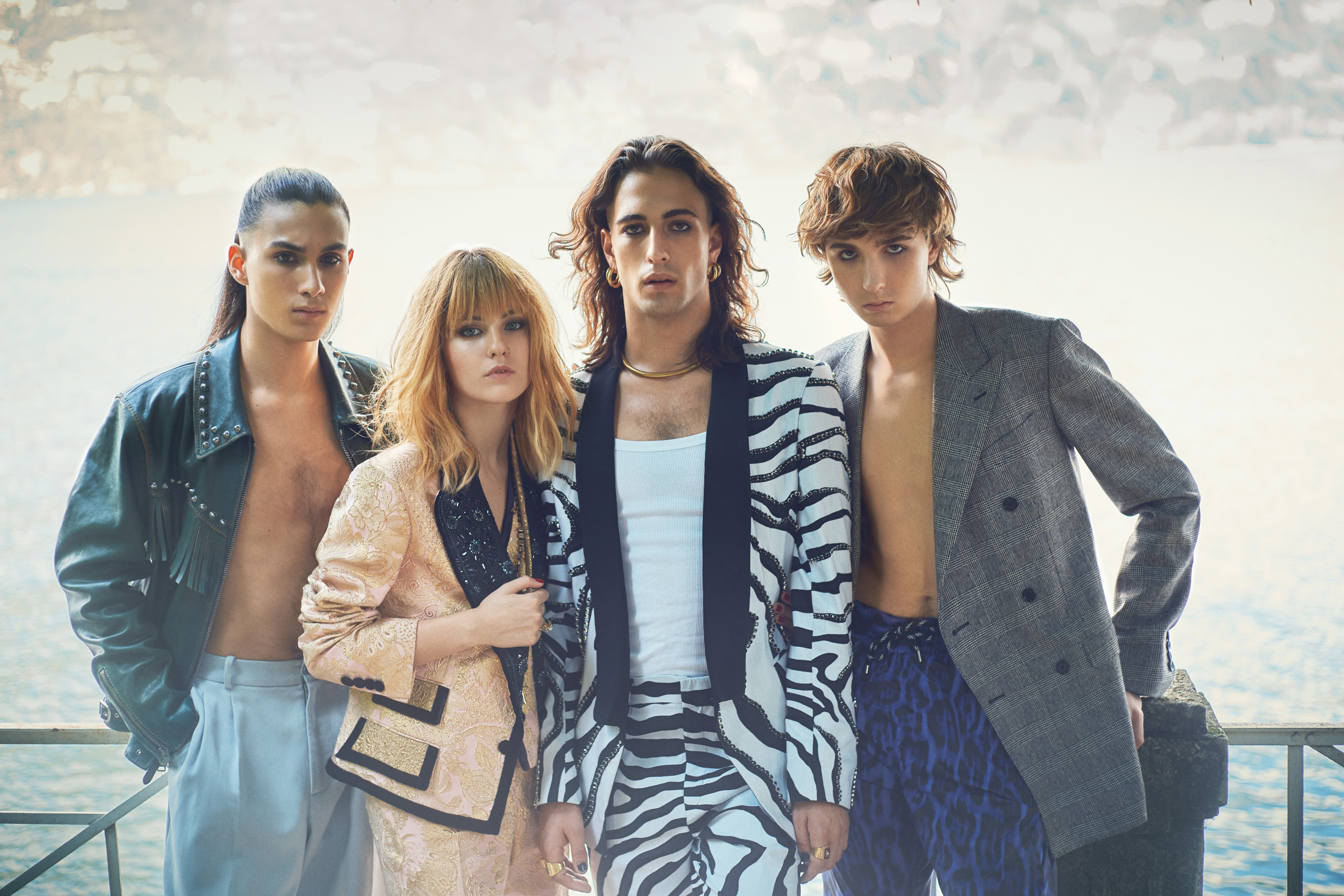
- Måneskin in 2018
- Studio albums: 3
- EPs: 2
- Singles: 17

The discography of Italian rock band Måneskin consists of three studio albums, two extended plays and seventeen singles. They have topped the Italian music charts on five occasions (with two singles and its three studio albums), and collected a lot of certifications from FIMI, selling over two million records in Italy alone.

After their victory at the Eurovision Song Contest 2021 with "Zitti e buoni", their releases entered numerous European and global weekly charts, and subsequently collected multiple international recording certifications. Among those certifications, "I Wanna Be Your Slave" and their cover of "Beggin'" were certified platinum by the BPI, and the former was also certified platinum and the latter triple platinum by the RIAA, totaling sales of over five million copies internationally.

== Albums ==
=== Studio albums ===
List of studio albums, with chart positions and certifications
Title	Details	Peak chart positions										Certifications
Title	Details	ITA	BEL (FL)	FIN	GER	NLD	NOR	SWE	SWI	UK	US	Certifications
Il ballo della vita	Released: 26 October 2018; Label: Sony Italy; Formats: CD, download, streaming, vinyl	1	7	5	37	7	20	27	15	—	—	FIMI: 5× Platinum
Teatro d'ira: Vol. I	Released: 19 March 2021; Label: RCA, Sony Italy; Formats: CD, download, streaming, vinyl	1	3	1	11	2	2	1	5	49	— (Note: Teatro d'ira: Vol. I did not enter the Billboard 200, but peaked at number four on the Heatseekers Albums.)	FIMI: 5× Platinum; BPI: Silver; IFPI NOR: Platinum; IFPI SWE: Platinum; NVPI: Gold
Rush!	Released: 20 January 2023; Label: Epic, Sony Italy; Formats: CD, download, streaming, vinyl	1	1	4	3	1	6	8	1	5	18	FIMI: 2× Platinum; BPI: Gold; BRMA: Gold
"—" denotes a recording that did not chart or was not released.

=== Reissues ===
List of reissue albums with details
Title	Details	Peak chart positions
Title	Details	ITA
Rush! (Are U Coming?)	Released: 10 November 2023; Label: Epic, Sony Italy; Format: CD, digital download, vinyl	3

=== Live albums ===
List of live albums with details
Title	Details	Peak chart positions	Sales
Title	Details	JPN	Sales
Live in Japan: Rush! World Tour	Released: 31 July 2024; Label: Sony Music Japan; Format: 2×CD	24	JPN: 2,990

== Extended plays ==
List of extended plays, with chart positions and certifications
Title	Details	Peak chart positions										Certifications
Title	Details	ITA	BEL (FL)	CAN	FIN	GER	LIT	NOR	SWE	SWI	US	Certifications
Chosen	Released: 15 December 2017; Label: Sony Italy; Formats: CD, download, streaming, vinyl	3	9	21	2	93	3	11	7	49	103	FIMI: 3× Platinum; MC: Gold
City Sessions (Amazon Music Live)	Released: 12 May 2023; Label: Epic, Sony Italy; Formats: Download, streaming	—	—	—	—	—	—	—	—	—	—	
"—" denotes a recording that did not chart or was not released.

== Singles ==
=== As lead artist ===
List of singles, with chart positions, certifications and album name
Title	Year	Peak chart positions										Certifications	Album
Title	Year	ITA	FIN	GER	LIT	NLD	NOR	SWE	SWI	UK	WW	Certifications	Album
"Chosen"	2017	2	—	—	15	—	—	—	—	—	—	FIMI: 2× Platinum	Chosen
"Morirò da re"	2018	2	—	—	6	—	—	—	—	—	—	FIMI: 3× Platinum	Il ballo della vita
"Torna a casa"	2018	1	14	—	5	—	—	— (Note: "Torna a casa" did not enter the Swedish Singellista Chart, but peaked at number 15 on the Swedish Heatseeker Chart.)	—	—	—	FIMI: 5× Platinum	Il ballo della vita
"Fear for Nobody"	2019	26	—	—	25	—	—	—	—	—	—	FIMI: Gold	Il ballo della vita
"L'altra dimensione"	2019	6	—	—	20	—	—	—	—	—	—	FIMI: Platinum	Il ballo della vita
"Le parole lontane"	2019	5	—	—	30	—	—	—	—	—	—	FIMI: Platinum	Il ballo della vita
"Vent'anni"	2020	12	—	—	9	—	—	—	—	—	—	FIMI: 2× Platinum	Teatro d'ira: Vol. I
"Zitti e buoni"	2021	2	1	9	1	1	2	1	2	17	22	FIMI: 5× Platinum; BPI: Silver; BVMI: Gold; IFPI NOR: Platinum; IFPI SWE: 2× Platinum; IFPI SWI: Platinum	Teatro d'ira: Vol. I
"I Wanna Be Your Slave"	2021	7	1	3	2	3	2	4	6	5	13	FIMI: 4× Platinum; BPI: 2× Platinum; BVMI: Platinum; IFPI NOR: Platinum; IFPI SWE: 2× Platinum; RIAA: Platinum	Teatro d'ira: Vol. I
"Mammamia"	2021	6	12	60	2	48	28	30	33	53	67	FIMI: Platinum	Rush!
"Supermodel"	2022	11	9	49	3	29	—	23	18	43	114	FIMI: 2× Platinum; BPI: Silver; IFPI SWE: Gold; IFPI SWI: Gold; RIAA: Gold	Rush!
"If I Can Dream"	2022	—	—	—	95	—	—	—	—	—	—		Elvis (Original Motion Picture Soundtrack)
"The Loneliest"	2022	1	—	82	2	30	37	48	13	—	75	FIMI: 3× Platinum; IFPI SWI: Gold	Rush!
"Gossip" (featuring Tom Morello)	2023	24	—	—	6	86	—	—	61	—	— (Note: "Gossip" did not enter the Billboard Global 200, but peaked at number 167 on the Global Excl. US.)	FIMI: Platinum; RIAA: Gold	Rush!
"Baby Said"	2023	99	—	—	18	—	—	—	—	—	—	FIMI: Gold	Rush!
"Honey (Are U Coming?)"	2023	32	—	80	20	—	—	—	43	75	170	FIMI: Gold	Rush! (Are U Coming?)
"Valentine"	2023	65	—	—	24	—	—	—	—	—	—		Rush! (Are U Coming?)
"—" denotes a recording that did not chart or was not released.

=== As featured artist ===
List of singles as featured artist, with chart positions, certifications and album name
Title	Year	Peaks	Album
Title	Year	ITA	Album
"Stato di natura" (Francesca Michielin featuring Måneskin)	2020	99	Feat (stato di natura)

=== Promotional singles ===
List of promotional singles
Title	Year	Album
"La fine"	2022	Rush!

== Other charted and certified songs ==
List of other charted songs, with chart positions, certifications and album name
Title	Year	Peak chart positions										Certification	Album
Title	Year	ITA	GER	IRL	LIT	NLD	SWE	SWI	UK	US	WW	Certification	Album
"Recovery"	2017	89	—	—	42	—	—	—	—	—	—	FIMI: Gold	Chosen
"Vengo dalla Luna"	2017	65	—	—	35	—	—	—	—	—	—	FIMI: Platinum	Chosen
"Beggin'"	2017	15	1	3	1	1	5	1	6	13	3	FIMI: 4× Platinum; BPI: 2× Platinum; BVMI: 3× Gold; IFPI SWE: 2× Platinum; IFPI SWI: Gold; RIAA: 4× Platinum	Chosen
"Let's Get It Started"	2017	84	—	—	37	—	—	—	—	—	—	FIMI: Gold	Chosen
"Somebody Told Me"	2017	58	—	—	25	—	—	—	—	—	—	FIMI: Gold	Chosen
"New Song"	2018	23	—	—	52	—	—	—	—	—	—		Il ballo della vita
"Sh*t Blvd"	2018	24	—	—	87	—	—	—	—	—	—		Il ballo della vita
"Immortale" (featuring Vegas Jones)	2018	18	—	—	—	—	—	—	—	—	—		Il ballo della vita
"Lasciami stare"	2018	36	—	—	—	—	—	—	—	—	—		Il ballo della vita
"Are You Ready?"	2018	41	—	—	41	—	—	—	—	—	—	FIMI: Gold	Il ballo della vita
"Close to the Top"	2018	6	—	—	—	—	—	—	—	—	—		Il ballo della vita
"Niente da dire"	2018	50	—	—	—	—	—	—	—	—	—		Il ballo della vita
"Coraline"	2021	13	—	96	3	63	— (Note: "Coraline" did not enter the Swedish Singellista Chart, but peaked at number one on the Swedish Heatseeker Chart.)	91	—	—	— (Note: "Coraline" did not enter the Billboard Global 200, but peaked at number 157 on the Global Excl. US.)	FIMI: 2× Platinum	Teatro d'ira: Vol. I
"Lividi sui gomiti"	2021	68	—	—	29	—	—	—	—	—	—		Teatro d'ira: Vol. I
"In nome del padre"	2021	72	—	—	38	—	—	—	—	—	—		Teatro d'ira: Vol. I
"For Your Love"	2021	92	—	—	13	—	—	—	—	—	—		Teatro d'ira: Vol. I
"La paura del buio"	2021	83	—	—	17	—	—	—	—	—	—	FIMI: Gold	Teatro d'ira: Vol. I
"Own My Mind"	2023	—	—	—	82	—	—	—	—	—	—		Rush!
"Timezone"	2023	—	—	—	75	—	—	—	—	—	—		Rush!
"Gasoline"	2023	—	—	—	47	—	—	—	—	—	—		Rush!
"Feel"	2023	—	—	—	97	—	—	—	—	—	—		Rush!
"—" denotes a recording that did not chart or was not released.
