= List of songs recorded by Måneskin =

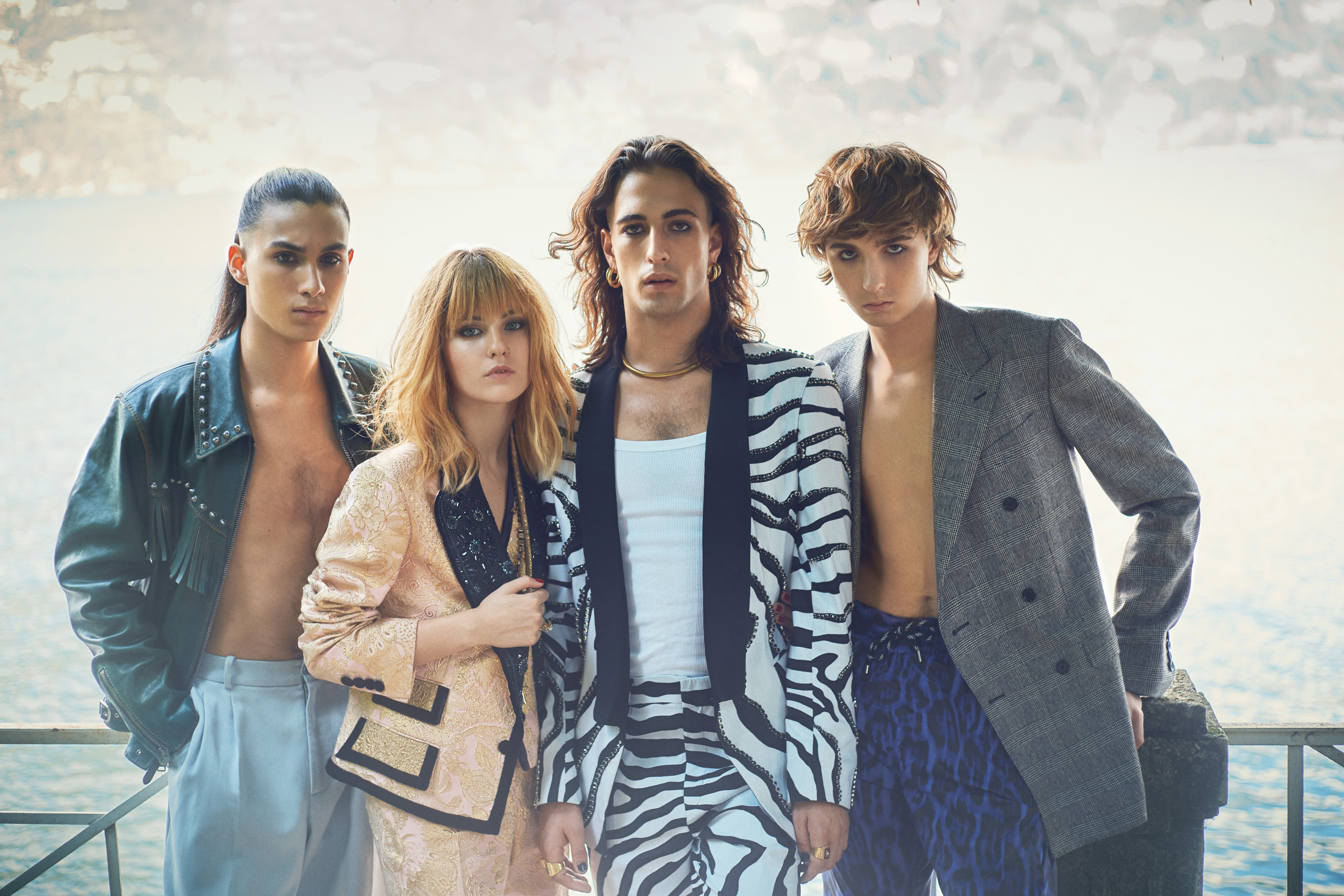
Members of Måneskin pictured in 2018; from left to right: Ethan Torchio, Victoria De Angelis, Damiano David and Thomas Raggi.

Italian rock band Måneskin has been officially formed in 2016 by the vocalist Damiano David, bassist Victoria De Angelis, guitarist Thomas Raggi, and drummer Ethan Torchio. Initially, they performed as baskers and published their covers on YouTube. In 2017, they took part in eleventh season of the Italian talent show X Factor, where they performed such covers as "Beggin'" by the Four Seasons, "Take Me Out" by Franz Ferdinand, "Somebody Told Me" by the Killers and "Let's Get It Started" by The Black Eyed Peas. as well as their original alternative rock song "Chosen". Later that year, "Chosen" was released as the band's debut single. It, alongside covers performed in the talent show and another original song "Recovery", composed Måneskin's first extended play Chosen. The following year, the group released their debut album Il ballo della vita (2018), which was a funk rock and pop rock effort, containing influences of reggae and ska. The album features two prominent figures in its lyricism, a muse "Marlena" and a man who wants to be with her until the very end.

For their 2021 album Teatro d'ira: Vol. I, Måneskin took a direction to hard rock and glam rock genres. With the title translating to "theatre of wrath", the lyrics focus on venting and rebelling against anything that might have failed them. Examples of hard rock influence on the project can be heard on songs such as "Zitti e buoni" and "I Wanna Be Your Slave", while the album also contains more dimmed tracks such as power ballad "Vent'anni" and "Coraline". Following the band's victory on Eurovision Song Contest 2021, they recorded an alternate version of "I Wanna Be Your Slave" with American punk-rock singer Iggy Pop, while their cover of "Beggin'" became widely popular. Måneskin's subsequent release was "Mammamia", a club-oriented dance-punk and rock "banger". In 2022, they began working on their third studio album with Swedish producer Max Martin, writing around ten tracks with him. One of them was pushed as a single―inspired by California sound "Supermodel", which is a pop rock song with grunge intro.

Besides their own projects, Måneskin collaborated with Francesca Michielin on a song "Stato di natura", as well as they contributed to the soundtrack Elvis with a cover of Elvis Presley's "If I Can Dream".

== Songs ==
Key
†	Indicates a cover of another artist's previous work
#	Indicates songs sung in Italian

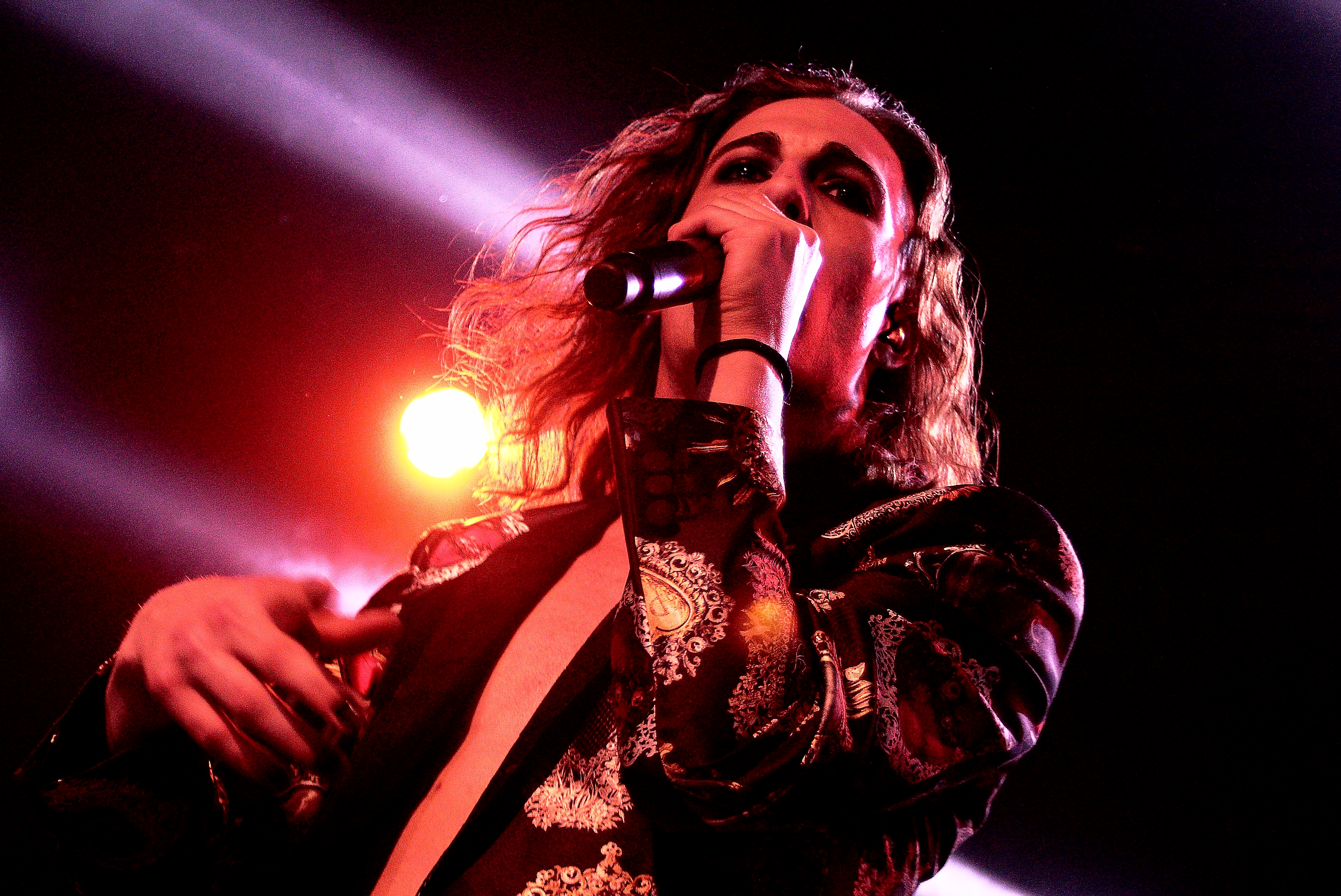
Måneskin's frontman, Damiano David (pictured), solely wrote most of the band's material.

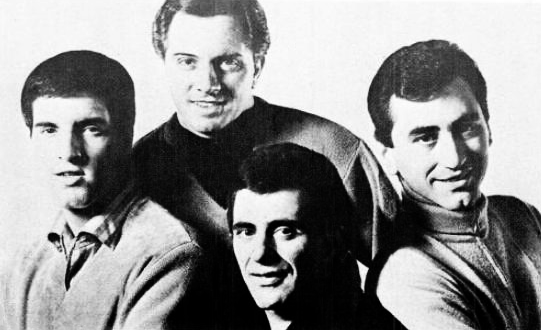
Måneskin covered "Beggin'" by the Four Seasons (pictured).

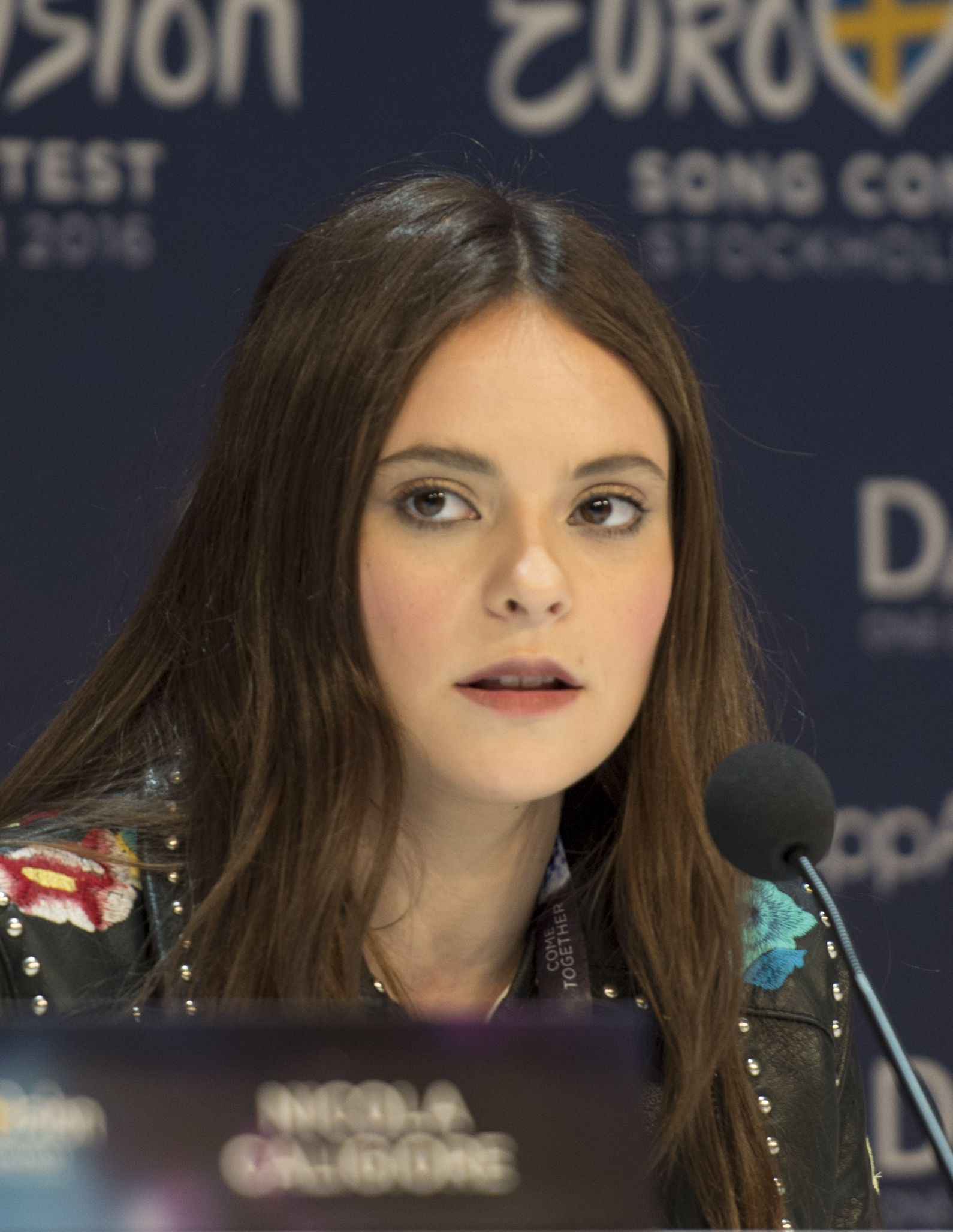
Francesca Michielin (pictured) collaborated with Måneskin on a song "Stato di natura".

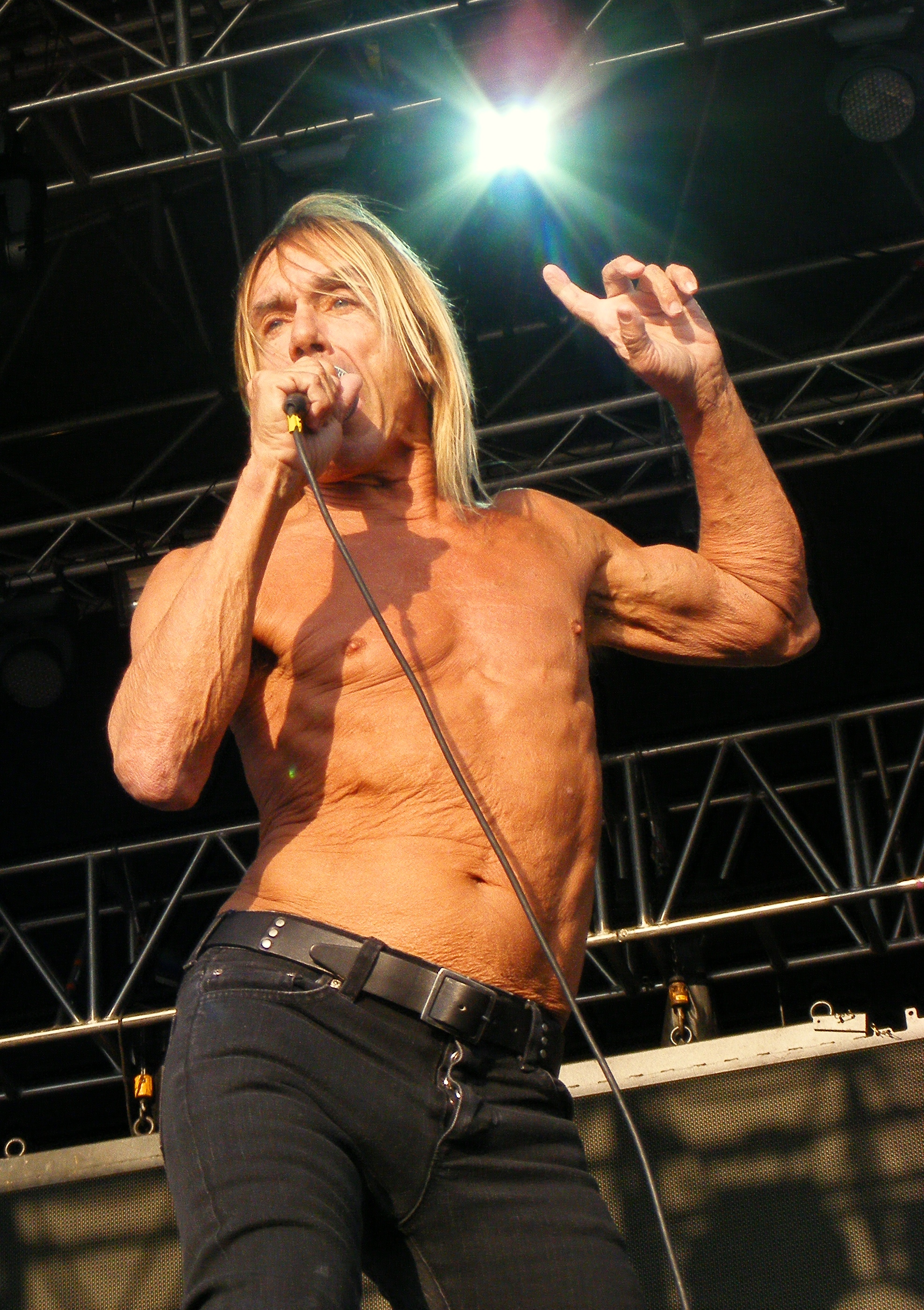
Iggy Pop (pictured) was featured on remix of "I Wanna Be Your Slave".

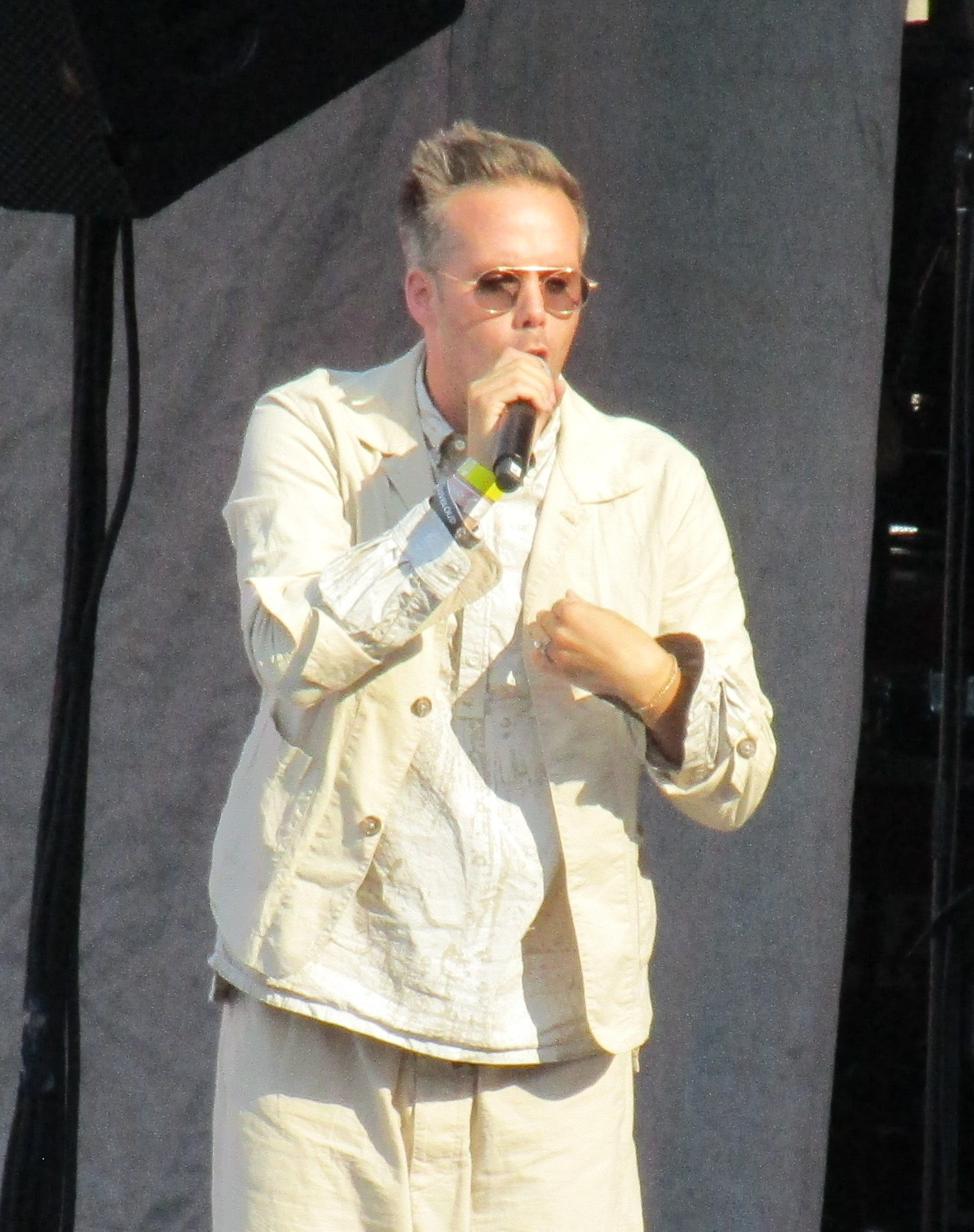
Justin Tranter (pictured) co-wrote "Supermodel".

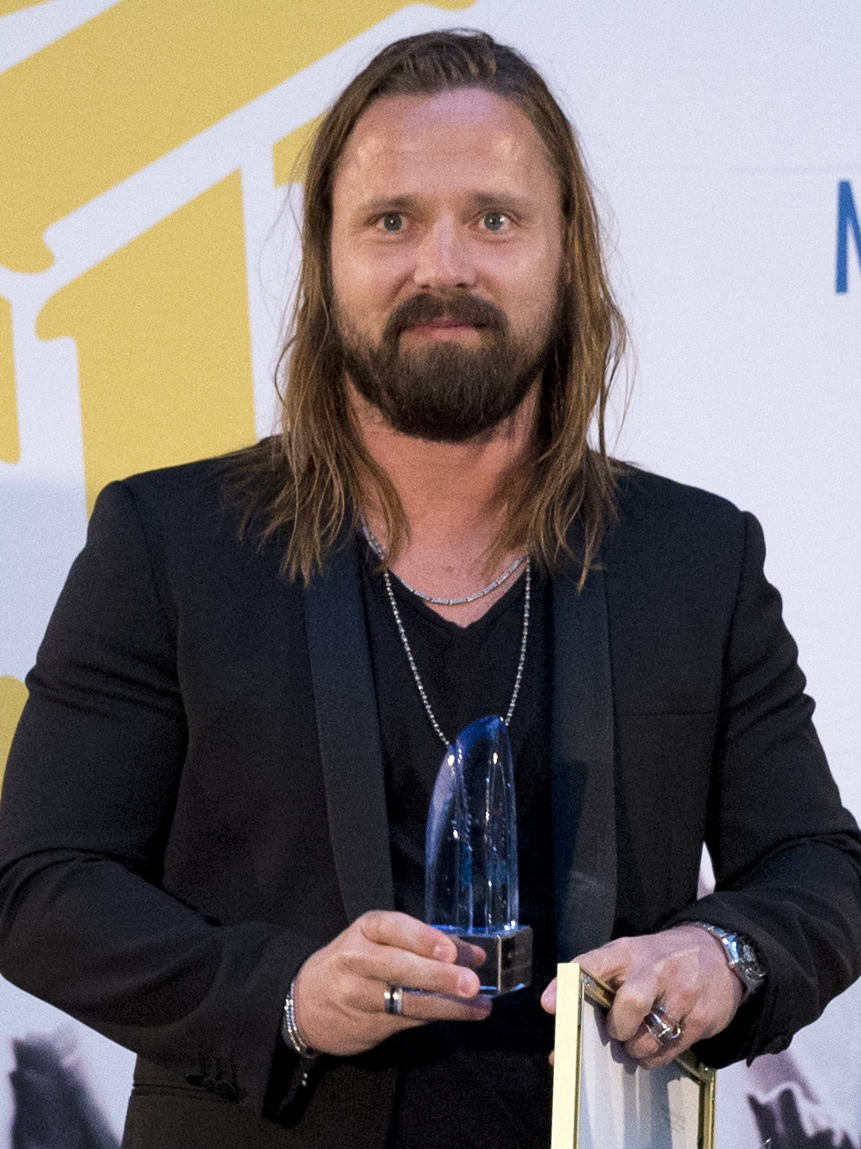
Måneskin worked with Max Martin (pictured) for their third upcoming studio album.

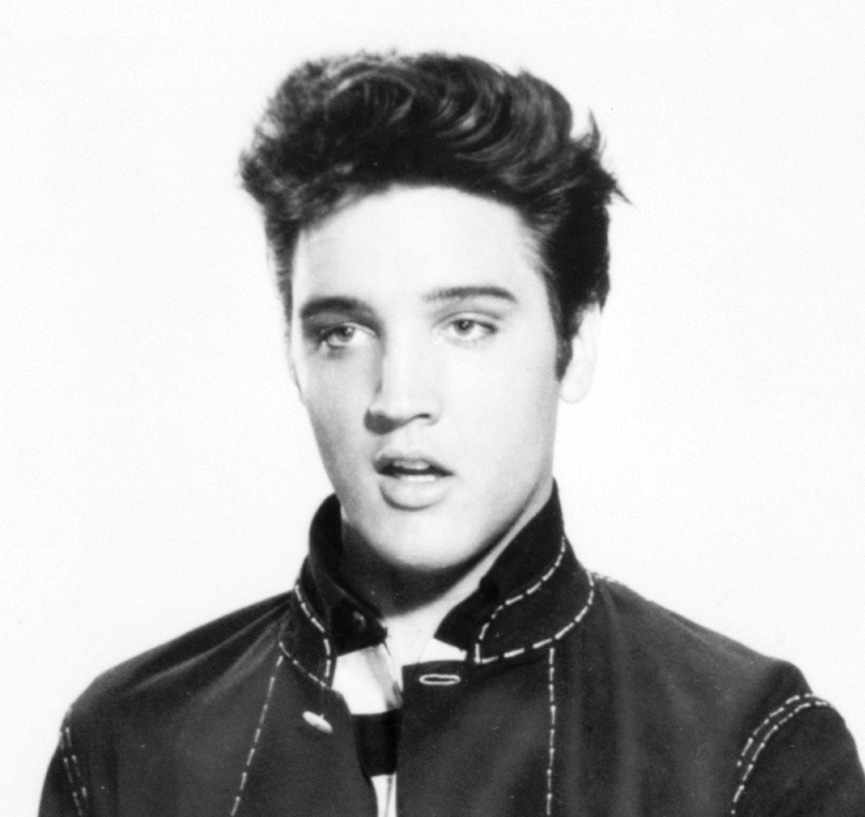
Måneskin contributed to the soundtrack of 2022 biographical film about Elvis Presley (pictured) with a cover of his song "If I Can Dream".

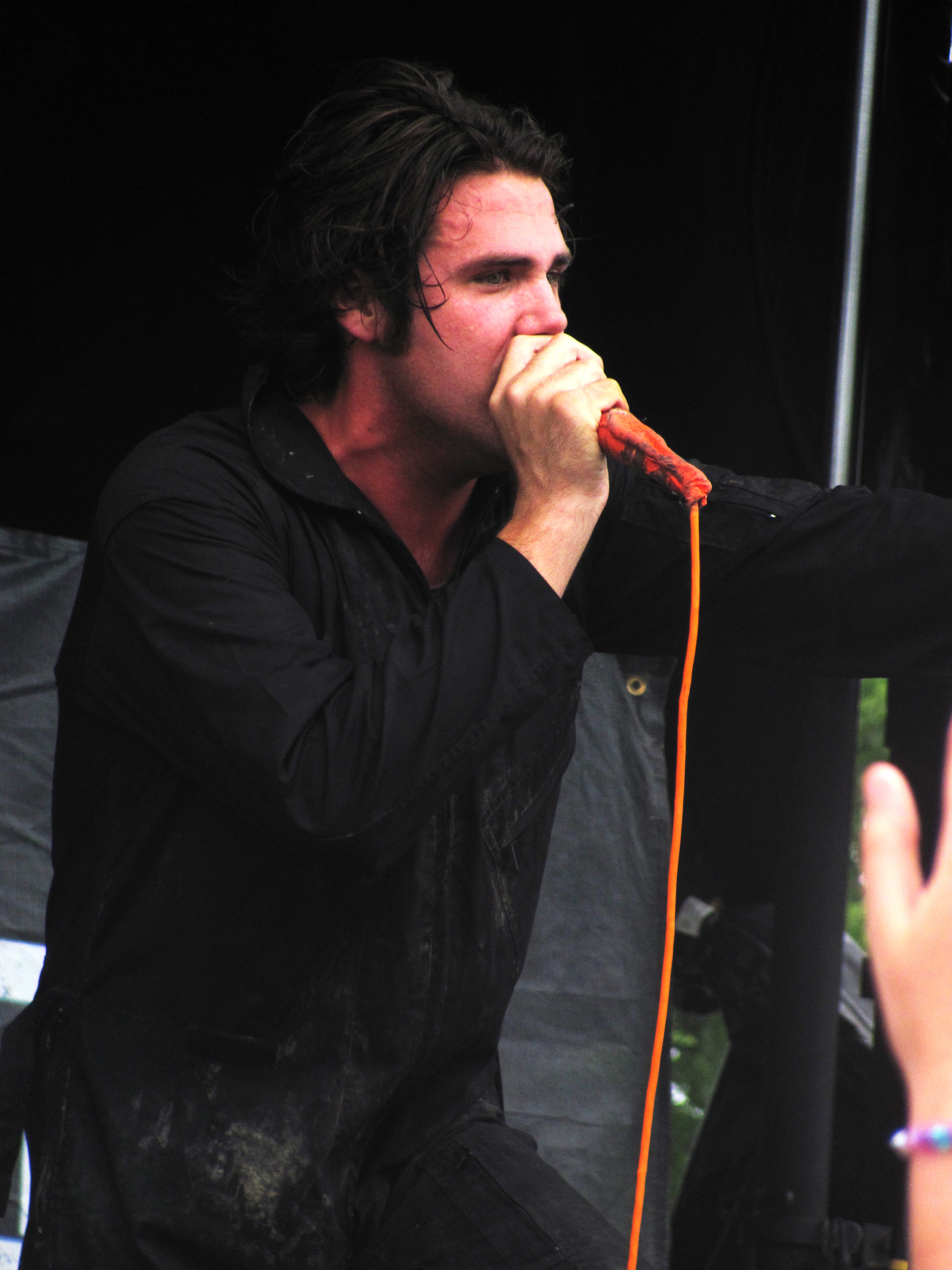
"The Loneliest" was co-written by Jason Evigan (pictured).

List of songs, lyricists, composers, originating album, and year released
Song	Lyricist(s)	Composer(s)	Album	Year	Ref.
"Chosen"	Damiano David	Victoria De Angelis; Thomas Raggi; Ethan Torchio	Chosen	2017	
"Recovery"	Damiano David	Victoria De Angelis; Thomas Raggi; Ethan Torchio	Chosen	2017	
"Vengo dalla Luna" # †	Diego Perrone; Michele Salvemini	Diego Perrone; Michele Salvemini	Chosen	2017	
"Beggin'" †	Bob Gaudio; Peggy Farina	Bob Gaudio; Peggy Farina	Chosen	2017	
"Let's Get It Started" †	will.i.am apl.de.ap Taboo; Terence Yoshiaki; Michael Fratantuno; George Pajon, Jr.	will.i.am apl.de.ap Taboo; Terence Yoshiaki; Michael Fratantuno; George Pajon, Jr.	Chosen	2017	
"Somebody Told Me" †	Brandon Flowers; Mark Stoermer; Dave Keuning; Ronnie Vannucci Jr.	Brandon Flowers; Mark Stoermer; Dave Keuning; Ronnie Vannucci Jr.	Chosen	2017	
"You Need Me, I Don't Need You" †	Ed Sheeran	Ed Sheeran	Chosen	2017	
"New Song"	Damiano David	Damiano David	Il ballo della vita	2018	
"Torna a casa" #	Damiano David	Damiano David	Il ballo della vita	2018	
"L'altra dimensione" #	Damiano David	Damiano David	Il ballo della vita	2018	
"Sh*t Blvd"	Damiano David	Damiano David	Il ballo della vita	2018	
"Fear for Nobody"	Damiano David	Damiano David	Il ballo della vita	2018	
"Le parole lontane" #	Damiano David	Damiano David	Il ballo della vita	2018	
"Immortale" # (featuring Vegas Jones)	Damiano David; Matteo Privitera	Luigi Florio	Il ballo della vita	2018	
"Lasciami stare" #	Damiano David	Damiano David	Il ballo della vita	2018	
"Are You Ready?"	Damiano David	Damiano David	Il ballo della vita	2018	
"Close to the Top"	Damiano David	Damiano David	Il ballo della vita	2018	
"Niente da dire" #	Damiano David	Damiano David	Il ballo della vita	2018	
"Morirò da re" #	Damiano David	Damiano David	Il ballo della vita	2018	
"Stato di natura" # (with Francesca Michielin)	Francesca Michielin; Damiano David	Francesca Michielin; Damiano David; Victoria De Angelis; Thomas Raggi; Ethan Torchio	Feat (stato di natura)	2020	
"Zitti e buoni" #	Damiano David	Damiano David; Victoria De Angelis; Thomas Raggi; Ethan Torchio	Teatro d'ira: Vol. I	2021	
"Coraline"	Damiano David	Damiano David; Victoria De Angelis; Thomas Raggi; Ethan Torchio	Teatro d'ira: Vol. I	2021	
"Lividi sui gomiti" #	Damiano David	Damiano David; Victoria De Angelis; Thomas Raggi; Ethan Torchio	Teatro d'ira: Vol. I	2021	
"I Wanna Be Your Slave" (Note: A remix featuring Iggy Pop was released as a stand-alone single and later, it was added to the track list of Japanese edition of Teatro d'ira: Vol. I.)	Damiano David	Damiano David; Victoria De Angelis; Thomas Raggi; Ethan Torchio	Teatro d'ira: Vol. I	2021	
"In nome del padre" #	Damiano David	Damiano David; Victoria De Angelis; Thomas Raggi; Ethan Torchio	Teatro d'ira: Vol. I	2021	
"For Your Love"	Damiano David	Damiano David; Victoria De Angelis; Thomas Raggi; Ethan Torchio	Teatro d'ira: Vol. I	2021	
"La paura del buio" #	Damiano David	Damiano David; Victoria De Angelis; Thomas Raggi; Ethan Torchio	Teatro d'ira: Vol. I	2021	
"Vent'anni" #	Damiano David	Damiano David; Victoria De Angelis; Thomas Raggi; Ethan Torchio	Teatro d'ira: Vol. I	2020	
"Mammamia"	Damiano David	Damiano David; Victoria De Angelis; Thomas Raggi; Ethan Torchio	Rush!	2021	
"Supermodel"	Damiano David; Victoria De Angelis; Thomas Raggi; Ethan Torchio; Justin Tranter; Max Martin; Rami Yacoub; Sylvester Sivertsen	Damiano David; Victoria De Angelis; Thomas Raggi; Ethan Torchio; Justin Tranter; Max Martin; Rami Yacoub; Sylvester Sivertsen	Rush!	2022	
"If I Can Dream" †	Walter Earl Brown	Walter Earl Brown	Elvis (Original Motion Picture Soundtrack)	2022	
"Own My Mind"	Damiano David; Victoria De Angelis; Thomas Raggi; Ethan Torchio; Nate Cyphert	Damiano David; Victoria De Angelis; Thomas Raggi; Ethan Torchio; Benjamin Berger; Ryan Rabin	Rush!	2023	
"Gossip" (featuring Tom Morello)	Damiano David; Victoria De Angelis; Thomas Raggi; Ethan Torchio; Madison Love	Damiano David; Victoria De Angelis; Thomas Raggi; Ethan Torchio; Joseph Janiak	Rush!	2023	
"Timezone"	Damiano David; Victoria De Angelis; Thomas Raggi; Ethan Torchio; Justin Tranter	Damiano David; Victoria De Angelis; Thomas Raggi; Ethan Torchio; Rami Yacoub; Sylvester Sivertsen	Rush!	2023	
"Bla Bla Bla"	Damiano David; Victoria De Angelis; Thomas Raggi; Ethan Torchio; Pablo Bowman	Damiano David; Victoria De Angelis; Thomas Raggi; Ethan Torchio; Peter Rycroft	Rush!	2023	
"Baby Said"	Damiano David; Victoria De Angelis; Thomas Raggi; Ethan Torchio; Justin Tranter	Damiano David; Victoria De Angelis; Thomas Raggi; Ethan Torchio; Max Martin; Rami Yacoub; Sylvester Sivertsen	Rush!	2023	
"Gasoline"	Damiano David; Victoria De Angelis; Thomas Raggi; Ethan Torchio; Justin Tranter	Damiano David; Victoria De Angelis; Thomas Raggi; Ethan Torchio; Rami Yacoub; Sylvester Sivertsen	Rush!	2023	
"Feel"	Damiano David; Victoria De Angelis; Thomas Raggi; Ethan Torchio; Savan Kotecha	Damiano David; Victoria De Angelis; Thomas Raggi; Ethan Torchio; Mattias Larsson; Robin Fredriksson	Rush!	2023	
"Don't Wanna Sleep"	Damiano David; Victoria De Angelis; Thomas Raggi; Ethan Torchio; Justin Tranter	Damiano David; Victoria De Angelis; Thomas Raggi; Ethan Torchio; Max Martin; Rami Yacoub; Sylvester Sivertsen	Rush!	2023	
"Kool Kids"	Damiano David; Victoria De Angelis; Thomas Raggi; Ethan Torchio	Damiano David; Victoria De Angelis; Thomas Raggi; Ethan Torchio	Rush!	2023	
"If Not for You"	Damiano David; Victoria De Angelis; Thomas Raggi; Ethan Torchio; Savan Kotecha	Damiano David; Victoria De Angelis; Thomas Raggi; Ethan Torchio; Max Martin; Rami Yacoub; Sylvester Sivertsen	Rush!	2023	
"Read Your Diary"	Damiano David; Victoria De Angelis; Thomas Raggi; Ethan Torchio; Justin Tranter	Damiano David; Victoria De Angelis; Thomas Raggi; Ethan Torchio; Rami Yacoub; Sylvester Sivertsen	Rush!	2023	
"Mark Chapman" #	Damiano David; Victoria De Angelis; Thomas Raggi; Ethan Torchio	Damiano David; Victoria De Angelis; Thomas Raggi; Ethan Torchio	Rush!	2023	
"La fine" #	Damiano David; Victoria De Angelis; Thomas Raggi; Ethan Torchio	Damiano David; Victoria De Angelis; Thomas Raggi; Ethan Torchio	Rush!	2023	
"Il dono della vita" #	Damiano David; Victoria De Angelis; Thomas Raggi; Ethan Torchio	Damiano David; Victoria De Angelis; Thomas Raggi; Ethan Torchio	Rush!	2023	
"The Loneliest"	Damiano David; Victoria De Angelis; Thomas Raggi; Ethan Torchio; James Abrahart; Jason Evigan; Rami Yacoub; Sarah Hudson	Damiano David; Victoria De Angelis; Thomas Raggi; Ethan Torchio; James Abrahart; Jason Evigan; Rami Yacoub; Sarah Hudson	Rush!	2022	
"Touch Me" (Note: A demo version first appeared as a b-side with "Mammamia" 12" single in 2021)	Damiano David; Victoria De Angelis; Thomas Raggi; Ethan Torchio	Damiano David; Victoria De Angelis; Thomas Raggi; Ethan Torchio	Rush! (Japan Version)	2021	
"Honey (Are U Coming?)"	Damiano David; Victoria De Angelis; Thomas Raggi; Ethan Torchio; Rami Yacoub; Justin Tranter; Sylvester Sivertsen; Jussi Karvinen; Cxloe		Rush! (Are U Coming?)	2023	
"Valentine"	Damiano David; Victoria De Angelis; Thomas Raggi; Ethan Torchio; Joseph Wander; Theo Hutchcraft		Rush! (Are U Coming?)	2023	
"Off My Face"	Damiano David; Victoria De Angelis; Thomas Raggi; Ethan Torchio; Benjamin Berger; DFA; Ruth-Anne Cunningham; Ryan Rabin		Rush! (Are U Coming?)	2023	
"The Driver"	Damiano David; Victoria De Angelis; Thomas Raggi; Ethan Torchio; Dave Pittenger; Jordan Riley		Rush! (Are U Coming?)	2023	
"Trastevere"	Damiano David; Victoria De Angelis; Thomas Raggi; Ethan Torchio		Rush! (Are U Coming?)	2023	
"Jolene" † (with Dolly Parton)	Dolly Parton		Rockstar; Download Exclusive Version & Deluxe Edition only	2023	
