= Beggin' (Måneskin recording) =

2017 single by Måneskin

- Live version cover

Promotional single by Måneskin

from the EP Chosen
- Released: December 8, 2017
- Recorded: 2017
- Studio: Metropolis Studio Milano
- Genre: Funk rock; glam rock
- Length: 3:31
- Label: Sony; RCA
- Songwriters: Bob Gaudio; Peggy Farina
- Producer: Lucio Fabbri

"Beggin'" is a song by Italian band Måneskin, a cover of the song of the same name originally by the Four Seasons. It was first displayed during the eleventh season of X Factor Italia, where the group was coached by Manuel Agnelli. A studio version of the song later appeared on their debut extended play Chosen, released in 2017.

== Recording ==
Recording sessions for the Chosen EP took place at the Metropolis in Milan, and mostly occurred at night, while the band was still competing on the show, and lasted only a few days. They were held at the recording studio owned by Lucio Fabbri, who served as the track's producer. Fabbri described the recording process for "Beggin'" as the result of a low-budget session. The song was "almost recorded live", in a spontaneous manner that, according to him, helped to preserve the "human component, which disappeared in today's music, often processed and filtered". Their cover largely follows the structure of the Madcon version, including the rap verse. Although it was not released as a single, it peaked at number 39 on the Italian Singles Chart and in 2018 received a gold certification by FIMI in their native country.

== Popular culture ==
Following the band's Eurovision victory in late May 2021, the song alongside the band's other releases started appearing on music charts across Europe and beyond; viral success for the song on video sharing service TikTok soon followed. "Beggin'" reached number one on the weekly charts in Austria, the Czech Republic, Germany, Greece, Lithuania, Netherlands, Portugal, Slovakia and Switzerland, the top five in Australia, Finland, France, Hungary, Ireland, Malaysia, New Zealand, Norway and Sweden, and the top ten in Canada, Denmark, India, Philippines, Singapore and the United Kingdom.

On its first charting week on the UK Singles Chart (issue date June 24, 2021), the song debuted at number 73, but in the following The Official Chart: First Look Top 20, it moved 56 places to number 17. In the second charting week it peaked at number 10, becoming the band's third UK Top 20 hit in less than a month, and as their song "I Wanna Be Your Slave" charted again in the Top 10 it was the first time they simultaneously had two songs in the Top 10 of the UK Singles Chart, thus becoming the first Italian act and the first Eurovision-associated act to achieve this. On its third charting week in the UK it peaked at number 7. It debuted on the Billboard Hot 100 at number 78, later peaking at number 13, and has also reached the top five on the Billboard Global 200 and Global Excl. US charts.

Their cover received a nomination for Favorite Trending Song at the American Music Awards of 2021, where they also performed the song, eventually losing to Megan Thee Stallion's "Body". They also performed the song on The Ellen DeGeneres Show, during the January 22, 2022, episode of Saturday Night Live, during the twenty-first season of The Voice USA, and on the final of the fifteenth season of X Factor Italia, returning as guests four years after their first performance there as contestants. Måneskin also made an appearance on The Tonight Show starring Jimmy Fallon with both Beggin' and I Wanna Be Your Slave.

A live recording of the song was released as a digital single on September 27, 2021.

== Personnel ==
- Damiano David – vocals
- Victoria De Angelis – bass guitar
- Thomas Raggi – electric guitar
- Ethan Torchio – drums

== Charts ==
=== Weekly charts ===
2017–2023 weekly chart performance for "Beggin'"
Chart (2017–2023)	Peak position
Argentina (Argentina Hot 100)	24
Australia (ARIA)	3
Austria (Ö3 Austria Top 40)	1
Belgium (Ultratop 50 Flanders)	4
Belgium (Ultratop 50 Wallonia)	21
Bolivia (Monitor Latino)	10
Brazil (Top 100 Brasil)	41
Canada (Canadian Hot 100)	9
Canada Rock (Billboard)	27
CIS Airplay (TopHit)	37
Costa Rica (Monitor Latino)	8
Czech Republic Singles Digital (ČNS IFPI)	1
Denmark (Tracklisten)	4
El Salvador (Monitor Latino)	7
Euro Digital Songs (Billboard)	5
Finland (Suomen virallinen lista)	3
France (SNEP)	5
Germany (GfK)	1
Global 200 (Billboard)	3
Greece International (IFPI)	1
Hungary (Rádiós Top 40)	33
Hungary (Single Top 40)	4
Hungary (Stream Top 40)	2
Iceland (Tónlistinn)	6
India International (IMI)	4
Ireland (IRMA)	3
Israel International Airplay (Media Forest)	9
Italy (FIMI)	2
Japan Hot Overseas (Billboard Japan)	11
Latvia (EHR)	2
Lithuania (AGATA)	1
Malaysia (RIM)	4
Mexico Airplay (Billboard)	5
Netherlands (Dutch Top 40)	15
Netherlands (Single Top 100)	1
New Zealand (Recorded Music NZ)	3
North Macedonia Airplay (Radiomonitor)	18
Norway (VG-lista)	2
Panama (PRODUCE)	14
Portugal (AFP)	1
Romania Airplay (TopHit)	70
Russia Airplay (TopHit)	54
Singapore (RIAS)	6
Slovakia Airplay (ČNS IFPI)	30
Slovakia Singles Digital (ČNS IFPI)	1
South Africa (RISA)	13
Spain (Promusicae)	17
Sweden (Sverigetopplistan)	5
Switzerland (Schweizer Hitparade)	1
Ukraine Airplay (TopHit)	12
UK Singles (Official Charts)	6
US Billboard Hot 100	13
US Adult Contemporary (Billboard)	20
US Adult Top 40 (Billboard)	5
US Hot Rock & Alternative Songs (Billboard)	2
US Mainstream Top 40 (Billboard)	3
US Rock Airplay (Billboard)	1
US Rolling Stone Top 100	18

2024 weekly chart performance for "Beggin'"
Chart (2024)	Peak position
Romania Airplay (TopHit)	73
Ukraine Airplay (TopHit)	61

2025 weekly chart performance for "Beggin'"
Chart (2025)	Peak position
Romania Airplay (TopHit)	65

==== Monthly charts ====
2021 monthly chart performance for "Beggin'"
Chart (2021)	Peak position
CIS Airplay (TopHit)	49
Czech Republic (Singles Digitál Top 100)	1
Russia Airplay (TopHit)	65
Slovakia (Rádio Top 100)	41
Slovakia (Singles Digitál Top 100)	1
Ukraine Airplay (TopHit)	20

2022 monthly chart performance for "Beggin'"
Chart (2022)	Peak position
CIS Airplay (TopHit)	51
Czech Republic (Singles Digitál Top 100)	36
Russia Airplay (TopHit)	77
Slovakia (Rádio Top 100)	76
Slovakia (Singles Digitál Top 100)	53
Ukraine Airplay (TopHit)	16

2023 monthly chart performance for "Beggin'"
Chart (2023)	Peak position
Romania Airplay (TopHit)	88
Ukraine Airplay (TopHit)	67

2024 monthly chart performance for "Beggin'"
Chart (2024)	Peak position
Romania Airplay (TopHit)	97
Ukraine Airplay (TopHit)	71

2025 monthly chart performance for "Beggin'"
Chart (2025)	Peak position
Romania Airplay (TopHit)	80

==== Year-end charts ====
2021 year-end chart performance for "Beggin'"
Chart (2021)	Position
Australia (ARIA)	21
Austria (Ö3 Austria Top 40)	5
Belgium (Ultratop Flanders)	36
Belgium (Ultratop Wallonia)	85
Brazil Streaming (Pro-Música Brasil)	73
Canada (Canadian Hot 100)	30
Denmark (Tracklisten)	32
France (SNEP)	39
Germany (Official German Charts)	14
Global 200 (Billboard)	25
Hungary (Single Top 40)	16
Hungary (Stream Top 40)	11
Ireland (IRMA)	36
Italy (FIMI)	43
Netherlands (Dutch Top 40)	89
Netherlands (Single Top 100)	30
New Zealand (Recorded Music NZ)	30
Portugal (AFP)	17
Spain (PROMUSICAE)	67
Sweden (Sverigetopplistan)	37
Switzerland (Schweizer Hitparade)	13
UK Singles (OCC)	51
US Billboard Hot 100	66
US Hot Rock & Alternative Songs (Billboard)	8
US Mainstream Top 40 (Billboard)	35
US Rock Airplay (Billboard)	23

2022 year-end chart performance for "Beggin'"
Chart (2022)	Position
Austria (Ö3 Austria Top 40)	63
Belgium (Ultratop Flanders)	151
Belgium (Ultratop Wallonia)	152
Brazil Streaming (Pro-Música Brasil)	186
Canada (Canadian Hot 100)	70
France (SNEP)	156
Global 200 (Billboard)	70
Lithuania (AGATA)	53
Switzerland (Schweizer Hitparade)	100
Ukraine Airplay (TopHit)	94
US Adult Top 40 (Billboard)	23
US Hot Rock & Alternative Songs (Billboard)	13
US Rock Airplay (Billboard)	3

2023 year-end chart performance for "Beggin'"
Chart (2023)	Position
Ukraine Airplay (TopHit)	147

2024 year-end chart performance for "Beggin'"
Chart (2024)	Position
Romania Airplay (TopHit)	163

2025 year-end chart performance for "Beggin'"
Chart (2025)	Position
Romania Airplay (TopHit)	194

== Certifications ==
Certifications and sales for "Beggin'"
Region	Certification	Certified units/sales
Australia (ARIA)	4× Platinum	280,000^{‡}
Austria (IFPI Austria)	3× Platinum	90,000^{‡}
Belgium (BRMA)	Platinum	40,000^{‡}
Brazil (Pro-Música Brasil)	2× Diamond	320,000^{‡}
Canada (Music Canada)	5× Platinum	400,000^{‡}
Denmark (IFPI Danmark)	Platinum	90,000^{‡}
France (SNEP)	Diamond	333,333^{‡}
Germany (BVMI)	3× Gold	600,000^{‡}
Hungary (MAHASZ)	9× Platinum	27,000^{‡}
Italy (FIMI)	4× Platinum	400,000^{‡}
Mexico (AMPROFON)	Diamond	300,000^{‡}
New Zealand (RMNZ)	4× Platinum	120,000^{‡}
Norway (IFPI Norway)	Platinum	60,000^{‡}
Poland (ZPAV)	4× Platinum	200,000^{‡}
Portugal (AFP)	3× Platinum	30,000^{‡}
Spain (Promusicae)	3× Platinum	180,000^{‡}
Switzerland (IFPI Switzerland)	Gold	10,000^{‡}
United Kingdom (BPI)	2× Platinum	1,200,000^{‡}
United States (RIAA)	4× Platinum	4,000,000^{‡}
Streaming
Greece (IFPI Greece)	2× Platinum	4,000,000^{†}
Sweden (GLF)	2× Platinum	16,000,000^{†}
^{‡} Sales+streaming figures based on certification alone.^{†} Streaming-only figures based on certification alone.

== See also ==
- List of number-one hits of 2021 (Austria)
- List of number-one hits of 2021 (Germany)
- List of number-one hits of 2021 (Switzerland)
- List of number-one singles of 2021 (Portugal)
- List of top 10 singles for 2021 in Australia
- List of top 10 singles in 2021 (Ireland)
- List of UK top-ten singles in 2021
