= L'altra dimensione =

Single by Måneskin

from the album Il ballo della vita
- Language: Italian
- Released: 10 April 2019
- Length: 2:06
- Label: Sony; RCA
- Songwriter: Damiano David
- Producers: Måneskin; Fabrizio Ferraguzzo

Måneskin singles chronology
"Fear for Nobody" (2019)	"L'altra dimensione" (2019)	"Le parole lontane" (2019)

Music video
- "L'altra dimensione" on YouTube

"L'altra dimensione" (lit. 'The other dimension') is a song by Italian group Måneskin. It was included in their debut album Il ballo della vita and released as a single on 10 April 2019 by Sony Music.

== Music video ==
The music video for "L'altra dimensione", directed by Antonio Usbergo and Niccolò Celaia, premiered on 11 April 2019 via Måneskin's YouTube channel.

== Charts ==
Chart performance for "L'altra dimensione"
Chart (2018–2021)	Peak position
Greece (IFPI)	37
Italy (FIMI)	6
Lithuania (AGATA)	20

== Certifications ==
Region	Certification	Certified units/sales
Italy (FIMI)	Platinum	50,000^{‡}
^{‡} Sales+streaming figures based on certification alone.
