= Teatro d'ira: Vol. I =

Studio album by Måneskin
- Released: 19 March 2021
- Studios: Mulino Recording (Acquapendente, Italy)
- Genre: Pop rock • hard rock
- Length: 29:03
- Languages: Italian; English
- Labels: Sony; RCA
- Producers: Måneskin; Fabrizio Ferraguzzo

Måneskin chronology
Il ballo della vita (2018)	Teatro d'ira: Vol. I (2021)	Rush! (2023)

Singles from Teatro d'ira: Vol. I
- 1. "Vent'anni" Released: 30 October 2020; 2. "Zitti e buoni" Released: 3 March 2021; 3. "I Wanna Be Your Slave" Released: 16 July 2021

Teatro d'ira: Vol. I is the second studio album by Italian rock band Måneskin. It was released on 19 March 2021 through RCA and Sony. It includes the singles "Vent'anni" and the Sanremo and Eurovision 2021-winning "Zitti e buoni", as well as the songs "I Wanna Be Your Slave" and "Coraline".

Following Måneskin's victory at the Eurovision Song Contest 2021 with "Zitti e buoni", the album started appearing on weekly charts across Europe. It peaked at number one on the Italian albums chart, and was certified quintuple platinum by FIMI. It also reached number one on the Finnish, Lithuanian, and Swedish album charts and reached the top ten of the charts in fourteen other territories. It has since received three other gold music certifications in three other countries.

== Description ==
From late 2019 until spring 2020, the band lived in London where they refined their playing skills, music style and worked on new material. This is the first part of a larger recording project entirely written by the four members of the group. Unlike the previous album Il ballo della vita (2018), the album was recorded entirely live in order to recreate the same atmosphere that Måneskin felt during the concerts held in previous years and can be heard in 1970s bootleg recordings.

According to the band, the project's title "Teatro d'ira" (transl. "theatre of wrath") and meaning are of "cathartic anger aimed at oppressions and oppressors, which leads to venting and rebelling against everything that makes you feel wrong and which, as a result, leads to a rebirth and change. We wanted to place this very powerful force in a context, that of the theater, which in the common imagination is perceived as elegant and calm. We like this antithesis: a contrast that lives when the curtain opens and, instead of a show or a ballet, we find ourselves catapulted into this explosion of energy. Theatre is a metaphor to represent art, the place where this powerful impulse generates something artistic and positive."

This concept was reiterated by the group during the presentation of the album: "Each piece was composed entirely by us, from the first to the last note. It will be a record out of the canons, we are aware of it but we screwed it up to give you the most sincere and real version of ourselves, because the music is the only thing that matters, and this time it will be only her to speak. For now, make yourself comfortable in the armchairs, the Theatre of Wrath is about to raise its curtain."

Unlike the previous album which was inspired by their muse "Marlena", this album was inspired by them. Album lyrics are dealing with various topics related to the young generation. With "Vent'anni" and "Zitti e buoni" being social manifestos about individuality, others like "I Wanna Be Your Slave" talk about duality in love relationships, and "La paura del buio" about people who fear both the unknown and other people for being different.

== Release ==
The album was released by Sony Music and RCA Records, packaged as a digipak including 12-page booklet with lyrics. It was also released in a vinyl edition.

=== Commercial performance ===
A week after its release, the album topped the FIMI Albums Chart and was certified Platinum for selling over 70,000 copies. Following the band's victory at the Eurovision Song Contest 2021, the album and its tracks - in particular, its single "Zitti e buoni" and songs "I Wanna Be Your Slave" and "Coraline" - started to enter weekly charts across Europe and beyond. By 27 May 2021, the album's tracks accumulated over 100 million streams on Spotify, and grew to over 340 million streams by 15 June. The album subsequently reached Top 15 on the Billboard World Albums Chart. On 9 July it topped the UK Rock & Metal Albums Chart.

== Reception ==
In Rockol's 8.5/10 review, Mattia Marzi praised members playing and writing skills. According to him, it has influences of power trios from the 1970s, and Sonic Youth up to Arctic Monkeys, with individual tracks going from hard rock "Zitti e buoni", dance-rock "I Wanna Be Your Slave", power ballad "Vent'anni", gothic rock "Coraline", and garage rock "Lividi sui gomiti". He concludes it is full of "anger and fury, including biting guitar strings, powerful bass lines, hard hits on the drums. And the over-the-top interpretation of Damiano. You still have time to get on the wagon."

In Rolling Stone Italia, Claudio Tedesco's review praised the arrogance of their 20s, to be an artistic step forward in comparison to the previous studio album, the quality of their playing and production, and that are using music and lyrics to strongly say something about diversity, fragility, phobias, sex, desire for revenge, representing a world of losers like the girl from "Coraline". He criticized that it can still be heard their musical influences, although this cannot be taken into account for them because they are still young, that in some tracks Damiano is vocally overdoing the emotions but it will be appreciated in this period of time, and that sounds better in Italian than in English songs "I Wanna Be Your Slave" and "For Your Love".

In laut.de's 4/5 review, Philipp Kause found it difficult to locate their style which is somewhere between alternative-funk rock and hard rock, almost heavy metal; he saw a similarity to Red Hot Chili Peppers. That the lyrics are emotional and charged as should be in rock'n'roll, sometimes delivered in rap rock fashion, and it is good that the lyrics are mainly in Italian rather than in the English language because many nuances and metaphors used in the lyrics which also share philosophical messages would not work well in English. In conclusion, he stated that band members "bring a considerable amount with them in order not to go down in history as a one hit wonder: appealing potential as a performer, accurate craft and compositional skills."

In Ondarock's 5/10 review, Antonio Silvestri was more critical than the others, concluding the quartet is still young but ambitious and led by talented frontman Damiano David whose voice stands out, and that the album is definitely an artistic growth and only with successive recordings from the project Teatro d'ira this album will give a definitive verdict on their future and impact.

It was elected by Loudwire as the 39th best rock/metal album of 2021. At the 15th CD Shop Awards the album was awarded as Best Work by an international artist.

== Track listing ==
All tracks are written by Damiano David, Victoria De Angelis, Thomas Raggi, and Ethan Torchio.

Teatro d'ira: Vol. I track listing
No.	Title	Length
1.	"Zitti e buoni"	3:14
2.	"Coraline"	5:00
3.	"Lividi sui gomiti"	2:45
4.	"I Wanna Be Your Slave"	2:53
5.	"In nome del padre"	3:39
6.	"For Your Love"	3:50
7.	"La paura del buio"	3:29
8.	"Vent'anni"	4:13
Total length:		29:03

Japanese edition bonus track
No.	Title	Length
9.	"I Wanna Be Your Slave" (featuring Iggy Pop)	2:53
Total length:		31:56

Japanese special edition bonus tracks
No.	Title	Length
9.	"I Wanna Be Your Slave" (featuring Iggy Pop)	2:53
10.	"For Your Love" (live at Roxy Los Angeles)	4:24
11.	"I Wanna Be Your Slave" (live at Roxy Los Angeles)	5:22
12.	"Mammamia" (live at Roxy Los Angeles)	3:05
13.	"Beggin'" (live at Roxy Los Angeles)	3:17
Total length:		52:04

== Personnel ==
Måneskin

- Damiano David – vocals, rhythm guitar on "Vent'anni"
- Victoria De Angelis – bass
- Thomas Raggi – lead guitar
- Ethan Torchio – drums

Production and design

- Måneskin – production
- Fabrizio Ferraguzzo – production
- Enrico La Falce – recording, mixing, mastering
- Luca Pellegrini – recording
- Enrico Brun – additional production
- Corrado "Mecna" Grilli – graphic design
- Gabriele Giussani – photography

== Charts ==
=== Weekly charts ===
Weekly chart performance for Teatro d'ira: Vol. I
Chart (2021–2023)	Peak position
Austrian Albums (Ö3 Austria)	5
Belgian Albums (Ultratop Flanders)	3
Belgian Albums (Ultratop Wallonia)	3
Canadian Albums (Billboard)	62
Croatian International Albums (HDU)	1
Czech Albums (ČNS IFPI)	3
Danish Albums (Hitlisten)	4
Dutch Albums (Album Top 100)	2
Finnish Albums (Suomen virallinen lista)	1
French Albums (SNEP)	25
German Albums (Offizielle Top 100)	11
Greek Albums (IFPI)	7
Hungarian Albums (MAHASZ)	39
Icelandic Albums (Tónlistinn)	2
Irish Albums (Official Charts)	29
Italian Albums (FIMI)	1
Japanese Albums (Oricon)	49
Japanese Hot Albums (Billboard Japan)	48
Japanese Rock Albums (Oricon)	9
Latvian Albums (LAIPA)	2
Lithuanian Albums (AGATA)	1
Norwegian Albums (VG-lista)	2
Polish Albums (ZPAV)	4
Portuguese Albums (AFP)	6
Scottish Albums (Official Charts)	24
Slovak Albums (ČNS IFPI)	3
Spanish Albums (Promusicae)	8
Swedish Albums (Sverigetopplistan)	1
Swiss Albums (Schweizer Hitparade)	5
UK Albums (Official Charts)	49
UK Rock & Metal Albums (Official Charts)	1
US Hard Rock Albums (Billboard)	19
US Heatseekers Albums (Billboard)	4
US World Albums (Billboard)	7

=== Year-end charts ===
2021 year-end chart performance for Teatro d'ira: Vol. I
Chart (2021)	Position
Austrian Albums (Ö3 Austria)	21
Belgian Albums (Ultratop Flanders)	20
Belgian Albums (Ultratop Wallonia)	70
Danish Albums (Hitlisten)	50
Dutch Albums (Album Top 100)	14
French Albums (SNEP)	182
Icelandic Albums (Tónlistinn)	9
Italian Albums (FIMI)	3
Norwegian Albums (VG-lista)	11
Polish Albums (ZPAV)	23
Portuguese Albums (AFP)	89
Spanish Albums (PROMUSICAE)	52
Swedish Albums (Sverigetopplistan)	10
Swiss Albums (Schweizer Hitparade)	32

2022 year-end chart performance for Teatro d'ira: Vol. I
Chart (2022)	Position
Belgian Albums (Ultratop Flanders)	73
Belgian Albums (Ultratop Wallonia)	112
Italian Albums (FIMI)	14
Lithuanian Albums (AGATA)	5
Portuguese Albums (AFP)	77
Spanish Albums (PROMUSICAE)	84

2023 year-end chart performance for Teatro d'ira: Vol. I
Chart (2023)	Position
Belgian Albums (Ultratop Flanders)	178
Belgian Albums (Ultratop Wallonia)	138
Italian Albums (FIMI)	70

== Certifications ==
Certifications for Teatro d'ira: Vol. I
Region	Certification	Certified units/sales
Brazil (Pro-Música Brasil)	Platinum	40,000^{‡}
Denmark (IFPI Danmark)	Platinum	20,000^{‡}
France (SNEP)	Platinum	100,000^{‡}
Italy (FIMI)	5× Platinum	250,000^{‡}
Netherlands (NVPI)	Gold	20,000^{‡}
New Zealand (RMNZ)	Gold	7,500^{‡}
Norway (IFPI Norway)	Platinum	20,000^{‡}
Poland (ZPAV)	3× Platinum	60,000^{‡}
Spain (Promusicae)	Gold	20,000^{‡}
Sweden (GLF)	Platinum	30,000^{‡}
United Kingdom (BPI)	Silver	60,000^{‡}
^{‡} Sales+streaming figures based on certification alone.

== Release history ==
Release dates and formats for Teatro d'ira: Vol. I
Country	Date	Format(s)	Label	Ref.
World	19 March 2021	Digital download, streaming	Sony; RCA	
Europe	19 March 2021	CD	Sony; RCA	
Italy	19 March 2021	LP	Sony; RCA	
Italy	16 April 2021	LP	Sony; RCA	
Japan	13 October 2021	CD (Japanese edition)	Sony; RCA	
