= Chosen (Måneskin song) =

Single by Måneskin

from the EP Chosen
- Released: 24 November 2017
- Studio: L'Isola Studios, Metropolis Recording Studio, Milan
- Genre: Alternative rock; funk rock
- Length: 2:40
- Label: Sony; RCA
- Composers: Victoria De Angelis; Thomas Raggi; Ethan Torchio
- Lyricist: Damiano David
- Producer: Måneskin

Måneskin singles chronology
"Chosen" (2017)	"Morirò da re" (2018)

Music video
- "Chosen" on YouTube

"Chosen" is the debut single by Italian group Måneskin. It was released on 24 November 2017 by Sony Music and was included in their debut EP with the same name.

The band originally performed an early version of Chosen during the auditions of the eleventh season of X Factor Italia. The final song premiered on 23 November 2017 during the fifth episode of the live show

The main riff for this song was written by bassist Victoria De Angelis, and the rest originated from that.

== Music video ==
The music video for "Chosen", directed by Trilathera, premiered on 13 December 2017 via Måneskin's official YouTube channel.

== Charts ==
Chart performance for "Chosen"
Chart (2017–2021)	Peak position
Greece (IFPI)	34
Italy (FIMI)	2
Lithuania (AGATA)	15
UK Vinyl Singles (OCC)	9

== Certifications ==
Certifications for "Chosen"
Region	Certification	Certified units/sales
Italy (FIMI)	2× Platinum	100,000^{‡}
^{‡} Sales+streaming figures based on certification alone.
