= Torna a casa =

Single by Måneskin

from the album Il ballo della vita
- Language: Italian
- Released: 28 September 2018
- Genre: Rock
- Length: 3:50
- Label: Sony; RCA
- Songwriter: Damiano David
- Producers: Måneskin; Fabrizio Ferraguzzo

Måneskin singles chronology
"Morirò da re" (2018)	"Torna a casa" (2018)	"Fear for Nobody" (2019)

Music video
- "Torna a casa" on YouTube

"Torna a casa" (lit. 'Come back home') is a rock ballad song by Italian group Måneskin. It was released on 28 September 2018 by Sony Music and was included in their debut album Il ballo della vita.

The single topped the FIMI chart in Italy and received the quintuple platinum certification. By July 2025, the music video on YouTube has gathered more than 185 million views.

== Music video ==
The music video for "Torna a casa", directed by Giacomo Triglia and shot inside Villa Arconati, premiered on 1 October 2018 via Måneskin's official YouTube channel. It featured dancers Francesca Stelladiplastica and Silvia Bonavigo.

== Charts ==
Chart performance for "Torna a casa"
Chart (2018–2021)	Peak position
Finland (Suomen virallinen lista)	14
Greece (IFPI)	11
Italy (FIMI)	1
Lithuania (AGATA)	5
Portugal (AFP)	83
Sweden Heatseeker (Sverigetopplistan)	15

== Certifications ==
Certifications for "Torna a casa"
Region	Certification	Certified units/sales
Brazil (Pro-Música Brasil)	Gold	20,000^{‡}
Italy (FIMI)	5× Platinum	250,000^{‡}
Poland (ZPAV)	Gold	25,000^{‡}
^{‡} Sales+streaming figures based on certification alone.
