= Il ballo della vita =

Studio album by Måneskin
- Released: 26 October 2018
- Recorded: 2018
- Studios: Officine Meccaniche, The Sound of Violins in Milan
- Genres: Funk rock; pop rock
- Length: 34:11
- Languages: Italian; English
- Labels: Sony; RCA
- Producers: Måneskin, Fabrizio Ferraguzzo

Måneskin chronology
Chosen (2017)	Il ballo della vita (2018)	Teatro d'ira: Vol. I (2021)

Singles from Il ballo della vita
- 1. "Morirò da re" Released: 23 March 2018; 2. "Torna a casa" Released: 28 September 2018; 3. "Fear for Nobody" Released: 18 January 2019; 4. "L'altra dimensione" Released: 10 April 2019; 5. "Le parole lontane" Released: 13 September 2019

Il ballo della vita (lit. 'The dance of life') is the debut studio album by Italian rock band Måneskin. It was released on 26 October 2018. The album peaked at number one on the Italian Albums Chart, managed to reach Top 20 on European music charts, and received a triple platinum certification by FIMI. The album includes the hit singles "Morirò da re", "Torna a casa", "Fear for Nobody", "L'altra dimensione" and "Le parole lontane".

== Description ==
Like in the previous EP Chosen, Il ballo della vita is a modern Italian pop rock record with influences from funk, reggae and ska. In an The Upcoming interview, the band cited Led Zeppelin, Arctic Monkeys, Harry Styles, Red Hot Chili Peppers and Bruno Mars as inspirations for the album.

The album's title is meaning a "celebration of youth, of freedom". The central figure of the album's lyrics is the fictional muse "Marlena", a "woman who represents beauty and the message we want to communicate: a message of freedom of choice, of attitude, of style to which we have tried to give a face, a name and a voice". Another protagonist is a man who wants to be with her until the very end. According to frontman Damiano David, she is also a "personification of the fear of not being able to be oneself. Man is security, believing in oneself, like a father or an older brother, and he takes this woman into an objectively uncomfortable situation to bring her to a better version: not changing her, but making her accept herself, her aspirations".

Five out of twelve songs in the album contain lyrics in English: "New Song", "Sh*t Blvd", single "Fear for Nobody", "Are You Ready?" and "Close to the Top".

== Promotion ==
In October 2018, the band released This Is Måneskin, a documentary film which delved into the band's career beginnings, personal life and the creative process of producing the album.

The album was promoted by their first career tour which was held between 2018 and 2019, and which had sold-out over 70 dates with more than 140,000 tickets, including their first European tour with eleven sold-out dates in Spain, France, Switzerland, Germany, Belgium and the United Kingdom.

== Commercial performance ==
By May 2019, the tracks accumulated more than 196 million streams on Spotify. Following the band's win at the Eurovision Song Contest 2021 with the song "Zitti e buoni" (from their succeeding album Teatro d'ira: Vol. I), the album entered charts outside Italy (and Switzerland) for the first time.

== Track listing ==
All lyrics and music written by Damiano David, except "Immortale" whose lyrics were written by David and Matteo Privitera, and music composed by Luigi Florio.

No.	Title	Length
1.	"New Song"	3:33
2.	"Torna a casa"	3:50
3.	"L'altra dimensione"	2:06
4.	"Sh*t Blvd"	3:22
5.	"Fear for Nobody"	2:30
6.	"Le parole lontane"	3:25
7.	"Immortale" (featuring Vegas Jones)	2:31
8.	"Lasciami stare"	2:49
9.	"Are You Ready?"	2:34
10.	"Close to the Top"	2:18
11.	"Niente da dire"	2:36
12.	"Morirò da re"	2:37
Total length:		34:11

== Personnel ==
Credits are adapted from the album's liner notes.

Måneskin

- Damiano David – vocals
- Victoria De Angelis – bass
- Thomas Raggi – electric guitar, acoustic guitar, resophonic guitar
- Ethan Torchio – drums, percussion, drum machine

Additional musicians

- Fabrizio Ferraguzzo – wind arrangements, orchestration, synth, programming, Juno, drum machine, lap steel guitar
- Enrico Brun – orchestration, synth, Hammond organ, Moog, Mellotron, Juno, piano, Solina, programming, Farfisa
- Riccardo Jeeba Gibertini – trumpet, flugelhorn, trombone, wind arrangements
- Marco Zaghi – tenor saxophone, baritone, flute, wind arrangements
- Andrea Di Cesare – violin, viola
- Mattia Boschi – violoncello

Production and design

- Måneskin – production, arrangement
- Fabrizio Ferraguzzo – production, mixing, mastering
- Riccardo Damian – recording
- Enrico La Falce – mixing, mastering
- Corrado Grilli – graphic design
- Paolo Sant'Ambrogio – photography

== Charts ==
=== Weekly charts ===
Weekly chart performance for Il ballo della vita
Chart (2018–2021)	Peak position
Austrian Albums (Ö3 Austria)	14
Belgian Albums (Ultratop Flanders)	7
Belgian Albums (Ultratop Wallonia)	19
Croatian International Albums (HDU)	2
Dutch Albums (Album Top 100)	7
Finnish Albums (Suomen virallinen lista)	5
German Albums (Offizielle Top 100)	37
Icelandic Albums (Tónlistinn)	14
Italian Albums (FIMI)	1
Lithuanian Albums (AGATA)	2
Norwegian Albums (VG-lista)	20
Polish Albums (ZPAV)	9
Spanish Albums (Promusicae)	35
Swedish Albums (Sverigetopplistan)	27
Swiss Albums (Schweizer Hitparade)	15
UK Album Downloads (OCC)	46

=== Year-end charts ===
Chart (2018)	Position
Italian Albums (FIMI)	5

Chart (2019)	Position
Italian Albums (FIMI)	27

Chart (2021)	Position
Austrian Albums (Ö3 Austria)	66
Belgian Albums (Ultratop Flanders)	68
Belgian Albums (Ultratop Wallonia)	163
Dutch Albums (Album Top 100)	96
Italian Albums (FIMI)	22

Chart (2022)	Position
Italian Albums (FIMI)	52
Lithuanian Albums (AGATA)	34

== Certifications ==
Certifications for Il ballo della vita
Region	Certification	Certified units/sales
France (SNEP)	Gold	50,000^{‡}
Italy (FIMI)	5× Platinum	250,000^{‡}
Poland (ZPAV)	Platinum	20,000^{‡}
^{‡} Sales+streaming figures based on certification alone.
