= Le parole lontane =

Single by Måneskin

from the album Il ballo della vita
- Language: Italian
- Released: 13 September 2019
- Genre: Rock
- Length: 3:25
- Label: Sony; RCA
- Songwriter: Damiano David
- Producers: Måneskin; Fabrizio Ferraguzzo

Måneskin singles chronology
"L'altra dimensione" (2019)	"Le parole lontane" (2019)	"Stato di natura" (2020)

Music video
- "Le parole lontane" on YouTube

"Le parole lontane" (lit. 'Distant words') is a rock ballad song by Italian group Måneskin. It was included in their debut album Il ballo della vita and released as a single on 13 September 2019 by Sony Music.

== Music video ==
The music video for "Le parole lontane", directed by Giacomo Triglia, premiered on 13 September 2019 via Måneskin's official YouTube channel.

== Charts ==
Chart performance for "Le parole lontane"
Chart (2018–2021)	Peak position
Greece (IFPI)	57
Italy (FIMI)	5
Lithuania (AGATA)	30

== Certifications ==
Region	Certification	Certified units/sales
Italy (FIMI)	Platinum	70,000^{‡}
^{‡} Sales+streaming figures based on certification alone.
