= Fear for Nobody =

Single by Måneskin

from the album Il ballo della vita
- Released: 11 January 2019
- Length: 2:30
- Label: Sony; RCA
- Songwriter: Damiano David
- Producers: Måneskin; Fabrizio Ferraguzzo

Måneskin singles chronology
"Torna a casa" (2018)	"Fear for Nobody" (2019)	"L'altra dimensione" (2019)

Music video
- "Fear for Nobody" on YouTube

"Fear for Nobody" is a song by Italian group Måneskin. It was included in their debut album Il ballo della vita and released as a single on 11 January 2019 by Sony Music.

== Music video ==
The music video for "Fear for Nobody", directed by Qwerty, premiered on 18 January 2019 via Måneskin's YouTube channel.

== Charts ==
Chart performance for "Fear for Nobody"
Chart (2018–2021)	Peak position
Greece (IFPI)	61
Italy (FIMI)	26
Lithuania (AGATA)	25

== Certifications ==
Region	Certification	Certified units/sales
Italy (FIMI)	Gold	35,000^{‡}
^{‡} Sales+streaming figures based on certification alone.
