= Morirò da re =

Single by Måneskin

from the album Il ballo della vita
- Language: Italian
- Released: 23 March 2018
- Genre: Alternative rock
- Length: 2:37
- Label: Sony; RCA
- Songwriter: Damiano David
- Producers: Måneskin; Fabrizio Ferraguzzo

Måneskin singles chronology
"Chosen" (2017)	"Morirò da re" (2018)	"Torna a casa" (2018)

Music video
- "Morirò da re" on YouTube

"Morirò da re" (lit. 'I'll die like a king') is a song by Italian group Måneskin. It was released on 23 March 2018 by Sony Music as the lead single from their debut album Il ballo della vita.

== Description ==
Appearing as the final track of the album, the song represents the first unpublished publication of the group to feature Italian language and was composed during the days off from the first tour held following their success at "X Factor (Italian TV series)". Regarding the meaning of the text, the Måneskin themselves explained that it concerns redemption:

From evil, good can be born. Good can be born by believing in oneself and never giving up. With our badly judged arrogance we want to send a message to our generation: be sure of yourself.

== Music video ==
The music video for "Morirò da re", directed by Antonio Usbergo and Niccolò Celaia, premiered on 26 March 2018 via Måneskin's YouTube channel.

== Charts ==
Weekly chart performance for "Morirò da re"
Chart (2018–2021)	Peak position
Greece (IFPI)	12
Italy (FIMI)	2
Lithuania (AGATA)	6
Portugal (AFP)	143

== Certifications ==
Certifications for "Morirò da re"
Region	Certification	Certified units/sales
Brazil (Pro-Música Brasil)	Gold	20,000^{‡}
Italy (FIMI)	3× Platinum	150,000^{‡}
^{‡} Sales+streaming figures based on certification alone.
