= Vent'anni (Måneskin song) =

Single by Måneskin

from the album Teatro d'ira: Vol. I
- Language: Italian
- Written: 2020
- Released: 30 October 2020
- Genre: Power ballad
- Length: 4:13
- Label: Sony; RCA
- Songwriters: Damiano David; Victoria De Angelis; Thomas Raggi; Ethan Torchio
- Producers: Måneskin; Fabrizio Ferraguzzo

Måneskin singles chronology
"Stato di natura" (2020)	"Vent'anni" (2020)	"Zitti e buoni" (2021)

Music video
- "Vent'anni" on YouTube

"Vent'anni" (lit. 'Twenty years') is a power ballad and seventh single by Italian group Måneskin. It was released on 30 October 2020 by Sony Music and was included in their second album Teatro d'ira: Vol. I. It received the double platinum certification by FIMI.

== Description ==
The band wrote the song during their stay in London in spring of 2020, during the COVID-19 lockdowns. The lyrics were written by the band's frontman Damiano David. It is dedicated to their generation, with his mature alter ego giving advice that David "would have liked to hear from someone older now that I am twenty years old". They tackle the anxieties and frustrations of feeling like a nobody, making mistakes, the uncertainty of the future, to not think in black-and-white because "you will be someone if you remain different from others". From a musical point of view it is a melodic power ballad.

== Music video ==
The music video for "Vent'anni", directed by Giulio Rosati, premiered on 6 November 2020 via Måneskin's YouTube channel.

== Charts ==
=== Weekly charts ===
Weekly chart performance for "Vent'anni"
Chart (2020–2021)	Peak position
Greece International (IFPI)	14
Italy (FIMI)	12
Lithuania (AGATA)	9
Portugal (AFP)	112
San Marino (SMRRTV Top 50)	33

=== Year-end charts ===
Year-end chart performance for "Vent'anni"
Chart (2021)	Position
Italy (FIMI)	73

== Certifications ==
Certifications for "Vent'anni"
Region	Certification	Certified units/sales
Italy (FIMI)	2× Platinum	140,000^{‡}
^{‡} Sales+streaming figures based on certification alone.
