= Coraline (song) =

Song by Måneskin

from the album Teatro d'ira: Vol. I
- Language: Italian
- Released: 19 March 2021
- Studio: Mulino Recording Studio in Acquapendente
- Genre: Hard rock • power ballad
- Length: 5:00
- Label: Sony; RCA
- Songwriters: Damiano David; Victoria De Angelis; Thomas Raggi; Ethan Torchio
- Producers: Fabrizio Ferraguzzo, Måneskin

"Coraline" is a rock ballad by Italian rock band Måneskin, from their second studio album, Teatro d'ira: Vol. I (2021). Although it was not released as a single it reached a Top 5 position in Finland, Greece and Lithuania. It received the double platinum certification by FIMI.

== Overview ==
The rock ballad was initially written in a hotel room by band's vocalist Damiano David and guitarist Thomas Raggi. According to Thomas Raggi, the song has a progressive composition with an arpeggio. The voice and acoustic guitar from the beginning are later met with electric guitar, bass guitar and drums in a "very theatrical way". According to Ethan Torchio it is a "story with a beginning, a development and an end". As explained by lyrics writer, Damiano David, the girl's name is unrelated to the same-titled novel Coraline by Neil Gaiman, but rather it was inspired by a true story. It is talking about a fragile girl's life which is withering, a knight-errant who is helpless in front of her suffering, and that the "tale ends badly, there is no happy ending".

== Charts ==
Chart performance for "Coraline"
| Chart (2021) | Peak position |
|---|---|
| Austria (Ö3 Austria Top 40) | 65 |
| Czech Republic Singles Digital (ČNS IFPI) | 72 |
| Euro Digital Songs (Billboard) | 17 |
| Finland (Suomen virallinen lista) | 5 |
| Global Excl. U.S. (Billboard) | 157 |
| Greece International (IFPI) | 5 |
| Ireland (IRMA) | 96 |
| Italy (FIMI) | 13 |
| Latvia (LaIPA) | 26 |
| Lithuania (AGATA) | 3 |
| Netherlands (Single Top 100) | 63 |
| Portugal (AFP) | 52 |
| Slovakia (Singles Digitál Top 100) | 83 |
| Spain (PROMUSICAE) | 91 |
| Sweden Heatseeker (Sverigetopplistan) | 1 |
| Switzerland (Schweizer Hitparade) | 91 |
| Ukraine (Tophit) | 97 |

== Certifications ==
Certifications for "Coraline"
| Region | Certification | Certified units/sales |
|---|---|---|
| Brazil (Pro-Música Brasil) | Platinum | 40,000^{‡} |
| France (SNEP) | Gold | 100,000^{‡} |
| Italy (FIMI) | 2× Platinum | 200,000^{‡} |
| Poland (ZPAV) | Platinum | 50,000^{‡} |
| Spain (Promusicae) | Gold | 30,000^{‡} |
^{‡} Sales+streaming figures based on certification alone.
