= Chosen (EP) =

EP by Måneskin
- Released: 8 December 2017
- Studios: L'Isola Studios, Metropolis Recording Studio, Milan
- Genre: Rock
- Length: 20:49
- Language: Italian • English
- Labels: Sony; RCA
- Producers: Måneskin; Lucio Fabbri

Måneskin chronology
Chosen (2017)	Il ballo della vita (2018)

Singles from Chosen
- 1. "Chosen" Released: 24 November 2017

Chosen is the debut extended play by Italian rock band Måneskin. It was released on 8 December 2017 and peaked at number 3 on the Italian Albums Chart.

The EP includes the single with the same name and another original song ("Recovery"), both in English, and various cover songs performed during the eleventh season of X Factor Italia. The EP was certified platinum and in addition its tracks collected two platinum and four gold certifications by FIMI.

Outside Italy and post-Eurovision success, the band's rock cover of "Beggin'" by The Four Seasons became the most popular song from the record and it currently sits at 2.2 billion Spotify streams as of now.

== Track listing ==
Chosen track listing
No.	Title	Lyrics	Music	Length
1.	"Chosen"	Damiano David	Victoria De Angelis; Thomas Raggi; Ethan Torchio	2:42
2.	"Recovery"	Damiano David	Victoria De Angelis; Thomas Raggi; Ethan Torchio	2:55
3.	"Vengo dalla Luna" (Caparezza cover)			3:04
4.	"Beggin'" (The Four Seasons cover)			3:31
5.	"Let's Get It Started" (Black Eyed Peas cover)			2:26
6.	"Somebody Told Me" (The Killers cover)			2:41
7.	"You Need Me, I Don't Need You" (Ed Sheeran cover)			3:30

== Personnel ==
Måneskin

- Damiano David – vocals
- Victoria De Angelis – bass guitar
- Thomas Raggi – electric guitar
- Ethan Torchio – drums

Production and design

- Måneskin – production (tracks 1 and 2)
- Lucio Fabbri – production (tracks 3–7)
- Donato Romano – engineering (track 1)
- Antonio Baglio – mastering (track 1)
- Alessandro Marcantoni – recording (tracks 3–7)
- Pietro Caramelli, Claudio Giussani – mastering (tracks 3–7)
- Cirasa – artwork
- Riccardo Ambrosio – photography

== Charts ==
=== Weekly charts ===
Weekly chart performance for Chosen
Chart (2017–2023)	Peak position
Austrian Albums (Ö3 Austria)	20
Belgian Albums (Ultratop Flanders)	9
Belgian Albums (Ultratop Wallonia)	33
Canadian Albums (Billboard)	21
Danish Albums (Hitlisten)	6
Finnish Albums (Suomen virallinen lista)	2
German Albums (Offizielle Top 100)	93
Icelandic Albums (Tónlistinn)	15
Italian Albums (FIMI)	3
Latvian Albums (LAIPA)	6
Lithuanian Albums (AGATA)	2
Norwegian Albums (VG-lista)	11
Polish Albums (ZPAV)	8
Swedish Albums (Sverigetopplistan)	7
Swiss Albums (Schweizer Hitparade)	49
US Billboard 200	103
US Top Rock Albums (Billboard)	14
US World Albums (Billboard)	2

=== Year-end charts ===
2017 year-end chart performance for Chosen
Chart (2017)	Position
Italian Albums (FIMI)	66

2018 year-end chart performance for Chosen
Chart (2018)	Position
Italian Albums (FIMI)	24

2021 year-end chart performance for Chosen
Chart (2021)	Position
Belgian Albums (Ultratop Flanders)	114
Danish Albums (Hitlisten)	76
Icelandic Albums (Tónlistinn)	73
Italian Albums (FIMI)	32
Swedish Albums (Sverigetopplistan)	78
US Top Rock Albums (Billboard)	59

2022 year-end chart performance for Chosen
Chart (2022)	Position
Italian Albums (FIMI)	73
Lithuanian Albums (AGATA)	19

== Certifications ==
Certifications for Chosen
Region	Certification	Certified units/sales
Canada (Music Canada)	Gold	40,000^{‡}
Denmark (IFPI Danmark)	Gold	10,000^{‡}
France (SNEP)	Gold	50,000^{‡}
Italy (FIMI)	3× Platinum	150,000^{‡}
New Zealand (RMNZ)	Gold	7,500^{‡}
Poland (ZPAV)	Platinum	20,000^{‡}
^{‡} Sales+streaming figures based on certification alone.
