= Måneskin =

Italian rock band

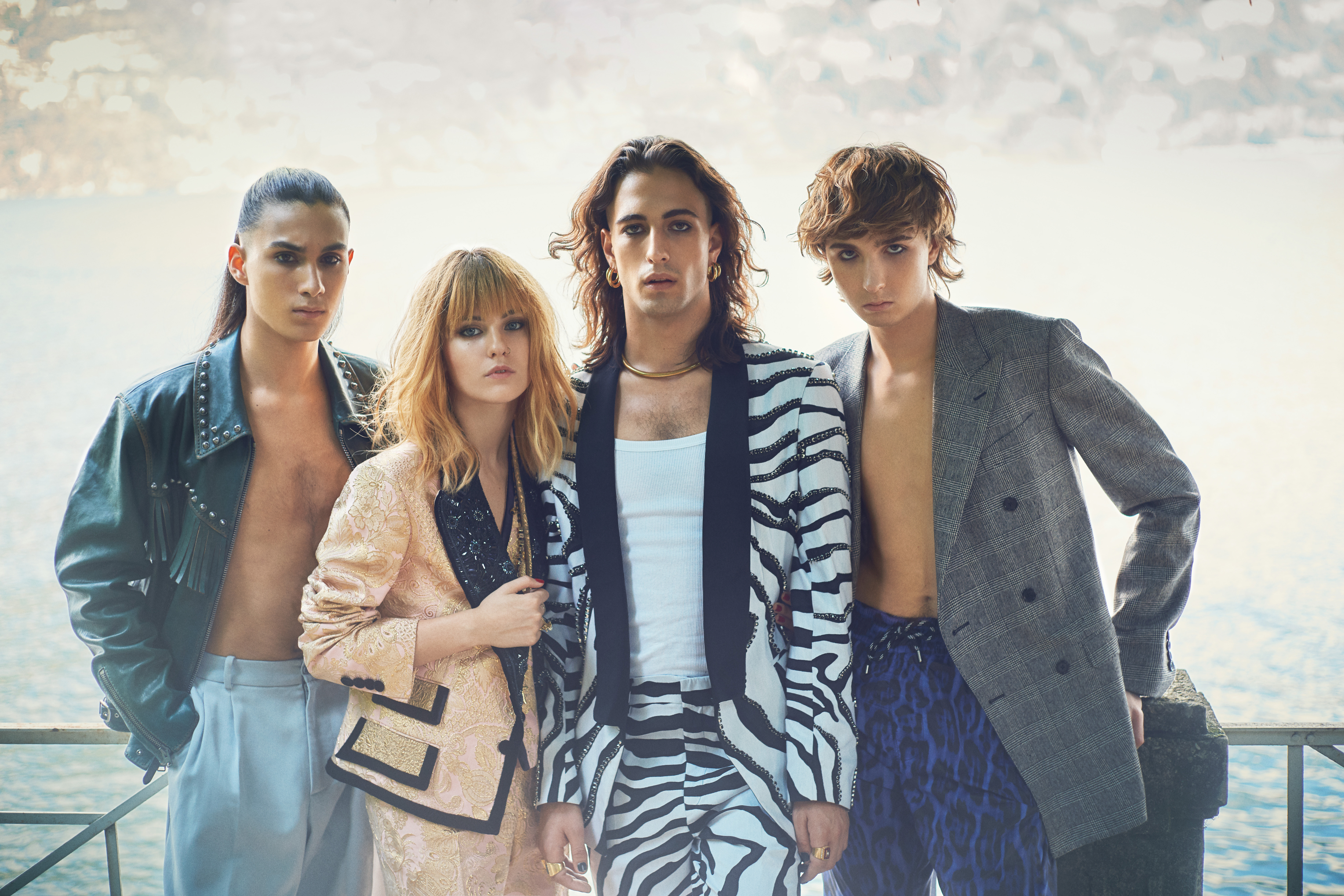
- Måneskin promotional photo, 2018; from left to right: Ethan Torchio, Victoria De Angelis, Damiano David and Thomas Raggi

Background information
- Origin: Rome, Italy
- Genres: Pop rock; alternative rock; glam rock; hard rock; funk rock
- Years active: 2016–2024 (Note: Indefinite hiatus)
- Labels: RCA; Sony; Epic
- Members: Damiano David; Victoria De Angelis; Thomas Raggi; Ethan Torchio

Måneskin (Note: English: /ˈmoʊnəskɪn/ MOH-nə-skin, Italian: [ˈmɔːneskin, ˈmaː-]; literal Danish for 'moonlight', pronounced [ˈmɔːnəˌske̝nˀ].) is an Italian rock band formed in Rome in 2016. The band is composed of lead vocalist Damiano David, bassist Victoria De Angelis, guitarist Thomas Raggi, and drummer Ethan Torchio. Performing in the streets in their early days, Måneskin rose to prominence after coming in second in the eleventh season of the Italian version of X Factor in 2017, where they were coached by Manuel Agnelli. Their international breakthrough occurred when the foursome won the Eurovision Song Contest 2021 for Italy, after also winning the Sanremo Music Festival, with the song "Zitti e buoni".

Måneskin has released the studio albums Il ballo della vita (2018), Teatro d'ira: Vol. I (2021), and Rush! (2023), and the extended play Chosen (2017). They have received 34 platinum and seven gold certifications from FIMI, and had sold over a million records in Italy before their post-Eurovision breakthrough. Previously, the band's most successful Italian single was "Torna a casa". In 2021, Måneskin became the first Italian rock band to reach the top 10 on the UK Singles Chart, with the songs "Zitti e buoni", "I Wanna Be Your Slave" and a cover of The Four Seasons' "Beggin'" reaching the top 10 on the Billboard Global Excl. U.S. chart, receiving multiple international certifications for sales of over three million copies internationally, and four million in total. They received their first Grammy nomination in the Best New Artist category at the 2023 Grammy Awards.

As of 2022, Måneskin have sold an estimated 40 million copies worldwide and garnered four billion streams across all streaming platforms, and six diamond, 133 platinum, and 34 gold certifications. The band has been on an unannounced hiatus since 2024, with each member pursuing solo ventures in the meantime, and a reunion is scheduled for 2027.

== History ==
=== 2015–2016: Formation ===
Members Damiano David, Victoria De Angelis, and Thomas Raggi first met each other as students during their high school days in Rome, with Ethan Torchio from nearby Frosinone soon joining them when they inquired on Facebook in a "Musicians Wanted" advert for a drummer to complete the line-up. Although the band's origins can be traced to 2015, it was officially formed in 2016 when the members had to choose the band's name because they had decided to register for Pulse, a local music contest for emerging bands. While brainstorming, De Angelis, who is half Danish, was asked by her bandmates to toss out some Danish words, and they agreed on Måneskin ('moonlight'), although its meaning is not related to the band itself. The Pulse contest also marked a turning point in their career, since they had to start writing their own songs. The competition led them to perform at the Felt music club & school in front of 200–300 people, and they later went on to win first prize.

They later performed as buskers in the streets of the Colli Portuensi district of Rome, as well as in the historical centre of Rome, including in Via del Corso. One of their first live concerts outside their native city took place in Faenza, at the 2016 Meeting of Independent Record Labels. Approximately 33 people attended the show. After a trip to Denmark, during which the band also performed some live shows, Måneskin strengthened their cohesiveness, and started to play together for several hours a day.

=== 2017–2019: X Factor and Il ballo della vita ===
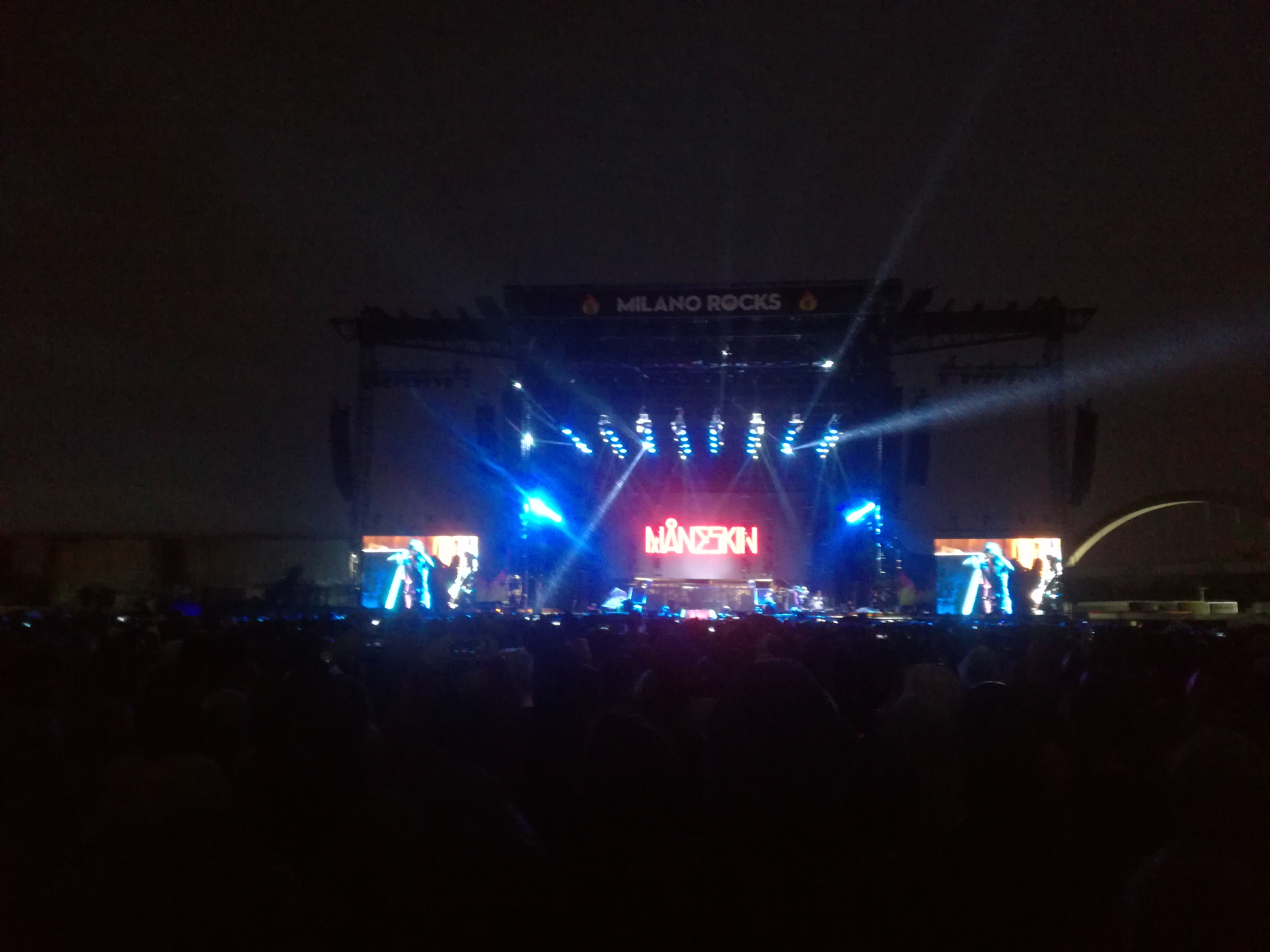
Måneskin performing in Milan, 2018

In 2017, they took part in the eleventh season of the Italian talent show X Factor, under the guidance of mentor Manuel Agnelli, finishing in second place behind Lorenzo Licitra. There they covered "Beggin'" by the Four Seasons, "Take Me Out" by Franz Ferdinand, and "Somebody Told Me" by the Killers, among others. The original song they performed during the show, "Chosen", was released as a single on 24 November 2017 by Sony Music and charted at number two on the Italian FIMI Singles Chart. It was included in the extended play of the same title, released in mid-December 2017 and mainly consisting of covers previously performed during the X Factor live shows. The EP was later certified double platinum by FIMI.

On 23 March 2018, the band released their first Italian-language single, "Morirò da re", which continued their commercial success. Måneskin's first full-length studio album, featuring "Morirò da re" and preceded by the ballad single "Torna a casa", was released on 26 September 2018. Both the album, titled Il ballo della vita, and the single "Torna a casa" topped the charts in Italy. To promote the album, the band theatrically released a documentary film, titled This Is Måneskin. The film premiered in Italy on 26 October 2018.

In January 2019, the band released their fourth single "Fear for Nobody", while in April 2019 their fifth single "L'altra dimensione" rose to fourth on the FIMI Singles Chart. Their sixth single "Le parole lontane", which was released in September 2019, reached top 5 of the FIMI Singles Chart and was certified platinum. During their first tour, held between 2018 and 2019, they sold-out over 70 dates along with selling more than 140,000 tickets, a figure that also included their first European tour with eleven sold-out dates in Spain, France, Switzerland, Germany, Belgium and the United Kingdom.

=== 2020–2021: Teatro d'ira: Vol. I, Eurovision and global recognition ===
The band's logo, used between 2020 and 2021

From late 2019 until spring 2020, the band lived in London where they worked on their music style and new material. In October 2020, their seventh single "Vent'anni" was released. On 6 March 2021, the band won the Sanremo Music Festival 2021 with the song "Zitti e buoni", ahead of runners-up Francesca Michielin and Fedez, and Ermal Meta. Their win was viewed by many to be a surprise, as rock is considered an atypical contesting music genre in the history of the Festival. Prior to Sanremo, the band announced their second studio album Teatro d'ira: Vol. I, which was released on 19 March 2021.

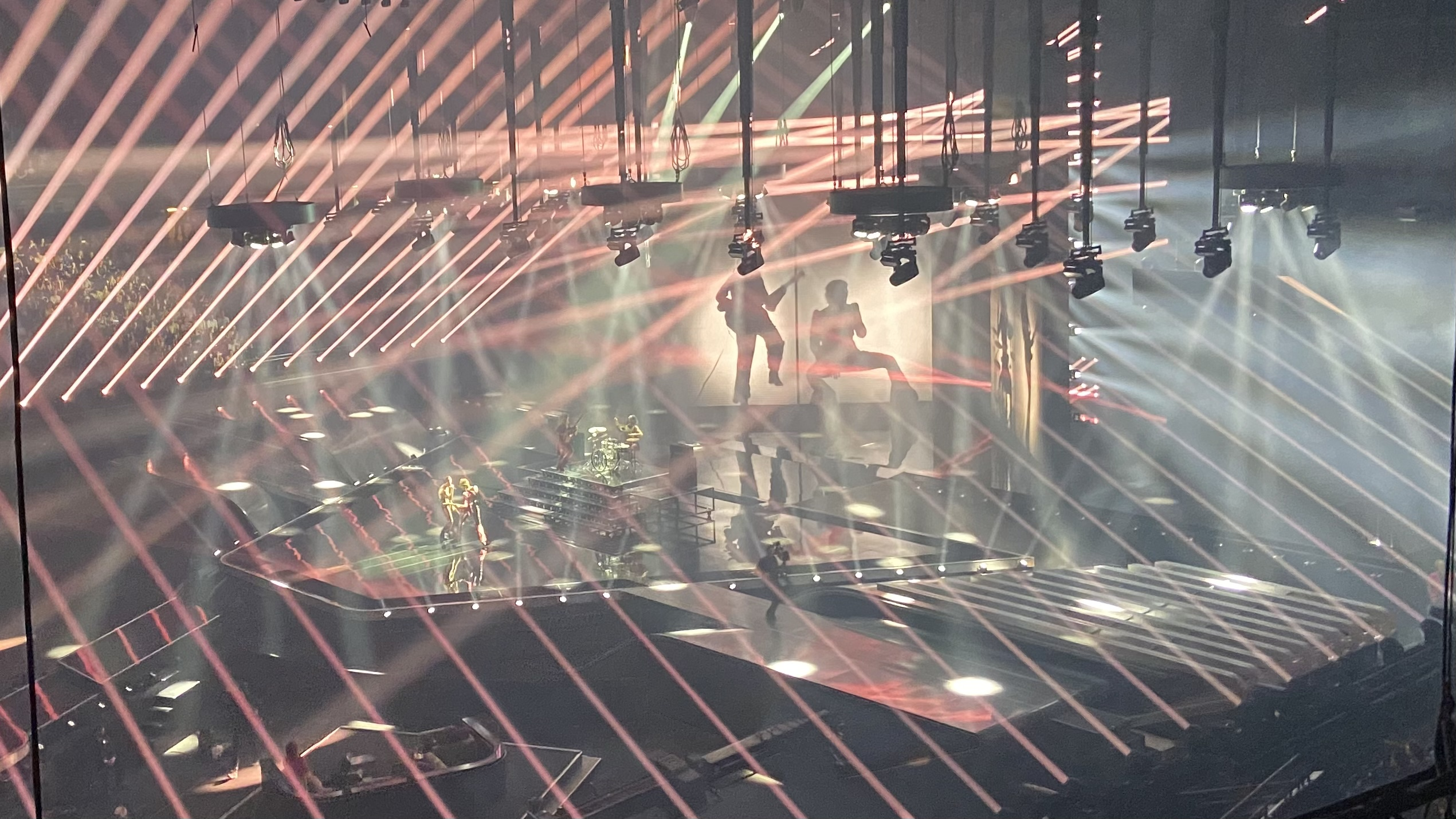
The band performing "Zitti e buoni" during a rehearsal for the Eurovision Song Contest 2021

As the winners of Sanremo 2021, Måneskin was designated as the Italian representatives at the Eurovision Song Contest 2021, held in Rotterdam, Netherlands, with "Zitti e buoni". On 15 May, Italy climbed to the top of the betting odds to win the contest, surpassing competitors from France, Switzerland and Malta, all of whom had occupied the top spot at one point between the release date of their songs and the night of the grand final. On 22 May, the band confirmed the predictions by going on to win the contest with an energetic performance, having received a total of 524 points, thus giving Italy its third Eurovision triumph after Gigliola Cinquetti in 1964 and Toto Cutugno in 1990. Måneskin also became the first band and "Zitti e buoni" the first rock song to win the contest since Lordi with "Hard Rock Hallelujah" for Finland in 2006. Upon accepting the winner's trophy, Damiano shouted into the microphone:

We just want to say to the whole of Europe, to the whole world. Rock and Roll never dies!

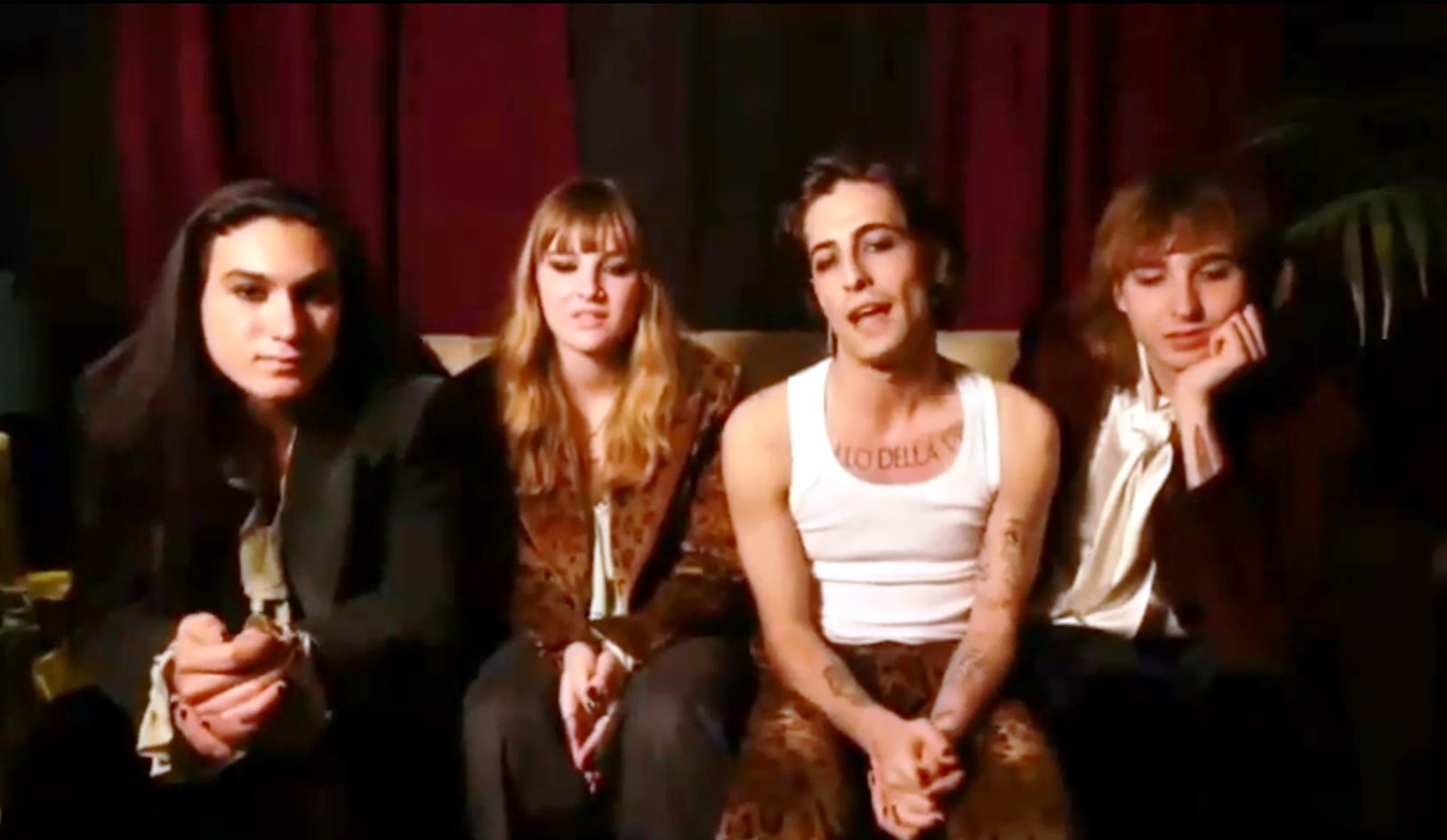
Måneskin in 2021

After the contest, the album Teatro d'ira: Vol. I, its single "Zitti e buoni", tracks "I Wanna Be Your Slave" and "Coraline", as well as other releases from the band entered weekly charts across Europe and beyond, including several Spotify global charts. "Zitti e buoni" and "I Wanna Be Your Slave" also entered the top ten of the Billboard Global Excl. U.S. chart. "Zitti e buoni" also became the first Italian-language song in 30 years to chart on the top 20 of the UK Singles Chart, peaking at number 17, as well as "I Wanna Be Your Slave" peaking at number five, which was the first song by an Italian rock band to reach the UK top ten, thus making the band the first Eurovision winners since Celine Dion to have two songs in the UK top 40, and a top 10 hit with a non-contest song. Their 2017 cover of the Four Seasons "Beggin'" also peaked at number six, thus making them the first Italian act and the first Eurovision-associated act to have two songs charting in the top ten of the UK Singles Chart at the same time. "Beggin'" later debuted on the US Billboard Hot 100 chart at number 78 and went on to peak at number 13, making them the second Eurovision-winning act in recent history to break into the chart.

The band went on a European promotional tour between June and July, and performed at a number of open-air summer music festivals in 2021, including Rock for People and Nova Rock Festival. A live recording of "Beggin'", recorded at Ronquières Festival 2021, was released as a digital single on 27 September 2021. The band's tenth single "Mammamia" was released on 8 October. On 26 October, they made their US television debut performing "Beggin'" on The Tonight Show Starring Jimmy Fallon, and later in November performed on The Ellen DeGeneres Show, the MTV Europe Music Awards where they won the award for Best Rock act, and at the American Music Awards. During this period, they also held a sold-out London concert at the O2 Academy Islington, sold-out US concerts at the Roxy Theatre and Bowery Ballroom, and opened for the Rolling Stones at Las Vegas' Allegiant Stadium.

=== 2022–2024: Rush! ===
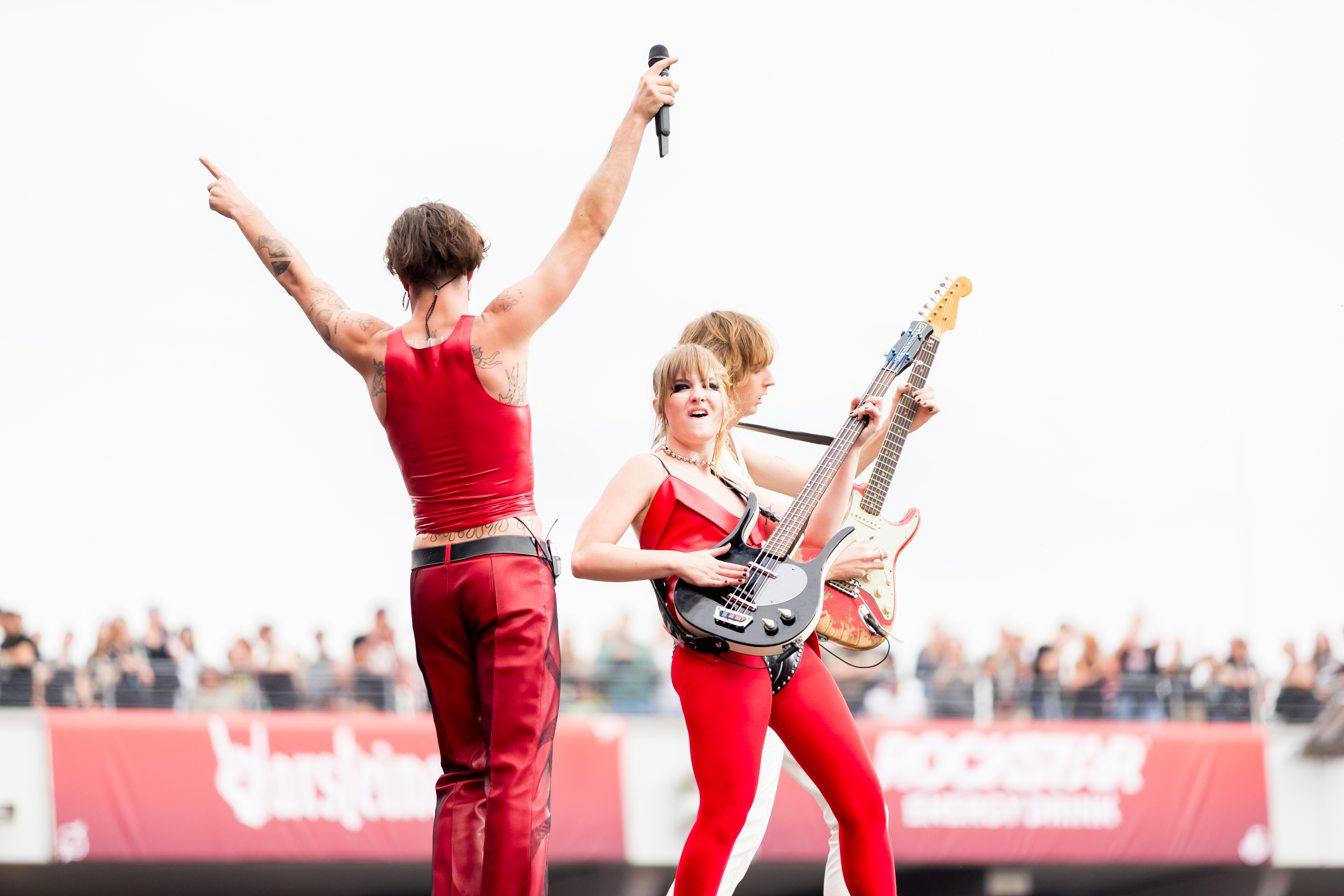
The group performing at Rock am Ring in 2022

On 22 January 2022, Måneskin was the musical guest on Saturday Night Live. The band's eleventh single "Supermodel" was released on 13 May, and was performed at the final of the Eurovision Song Contest 2022, held in Turin the following day. They also performed a short rendition of "If I Can Dream" which was later included in the soundtrack of the film Elvis. The band performed "Supermodel" with Jimmy Fallon subbing for an ill DeAngelis on The Tonight Show Starring Jimmy Fallon on 20 May, and at the 2022 MTV Video Music Awards (where the band won the Best Alternative Video category for "I Wanna Be Your Slave") on 28 August. Måneskin embarked on the Loud Kids Tour Gets Louder, which visited Japan, the Americas, and Europe between fall 2022 and summer 2023.

Their twelfth single "The Loneliest" was released on 7 October, and won on 12 September 2023 for Best Rock Video at the 2023 MTV Video Music Awards. The band's third studio album, Rush!, was released on 20 January 2023. They were nominated for the Best New Artist category for the 65th Annual Grammy Awards, but lost to jazz singer Samara Joy. "La fine" was released as a promotional single from Rush! on 16 December. On 13 January 2023, the band released the single and music video for "Gossip", featuring Tom Morello. In February 2023, Variety ran a profile piece on Måneskin, referring to them as "the biggest rock band to emerge in years", and The New York Times followed with its own profile that September, calling them "almost certainly the biggest Italian rock band of all time."

The band made their debut at the Glastonbury Festival in June 2023, followed by the Rush! World Tour, which visited Europe, the Americas, Oceania and Asia from September to December 2023. On 1 September, they released the single "Honey (Are U Coming?)", which was later included in Rush! (Are U Coming?), a reissue of Rush! that was released on 10 November.

=== 2024–present: Hiatus, solo projects and planned reunion ===
Måneskin paused their activities in 2024 because the members pursued individual projects, although the band did not formally break up. During the hiatus, Damiano David released his debut solo album, Funny Little Fears, in 2025, while guitarist Thomas Raggi released his solo album Masquerade later that year. In August 2026, the band was announced as a planned guest act for the 2027 Sanremo Music Festival.

== Musical style and influences ==
According to Damiano David, the group is "a translation of the music of the past into modernity". Måneskin's music has been classified as pop rock, alternative rock, glam rock, hard rock and funk rock. Their music style changed from a pop rock sound with funk influences on their first studio album, to hard rock on their second studio album, as heard in "Zitti e buoni". Their look and sound have been compared to 1970s rock music. The band members have cited various musical and fashion influences, including Led Zeppelin, Fleetwood Mac, Nirvana, Perry Farrell, Radiohead, Franz Ferdinand, David Bowie, Aerosmith, Black Sabbath, Gentle Giant, the Rolling Stones, the Doors, Arctic Monkeys, Red Hot Chili Peppers, IDLES, Harry Styles, Bruno Mars, R.E.M. and Italian rock bands Marlene Kuntz, Verdena and Afterhours.

== Band members ==
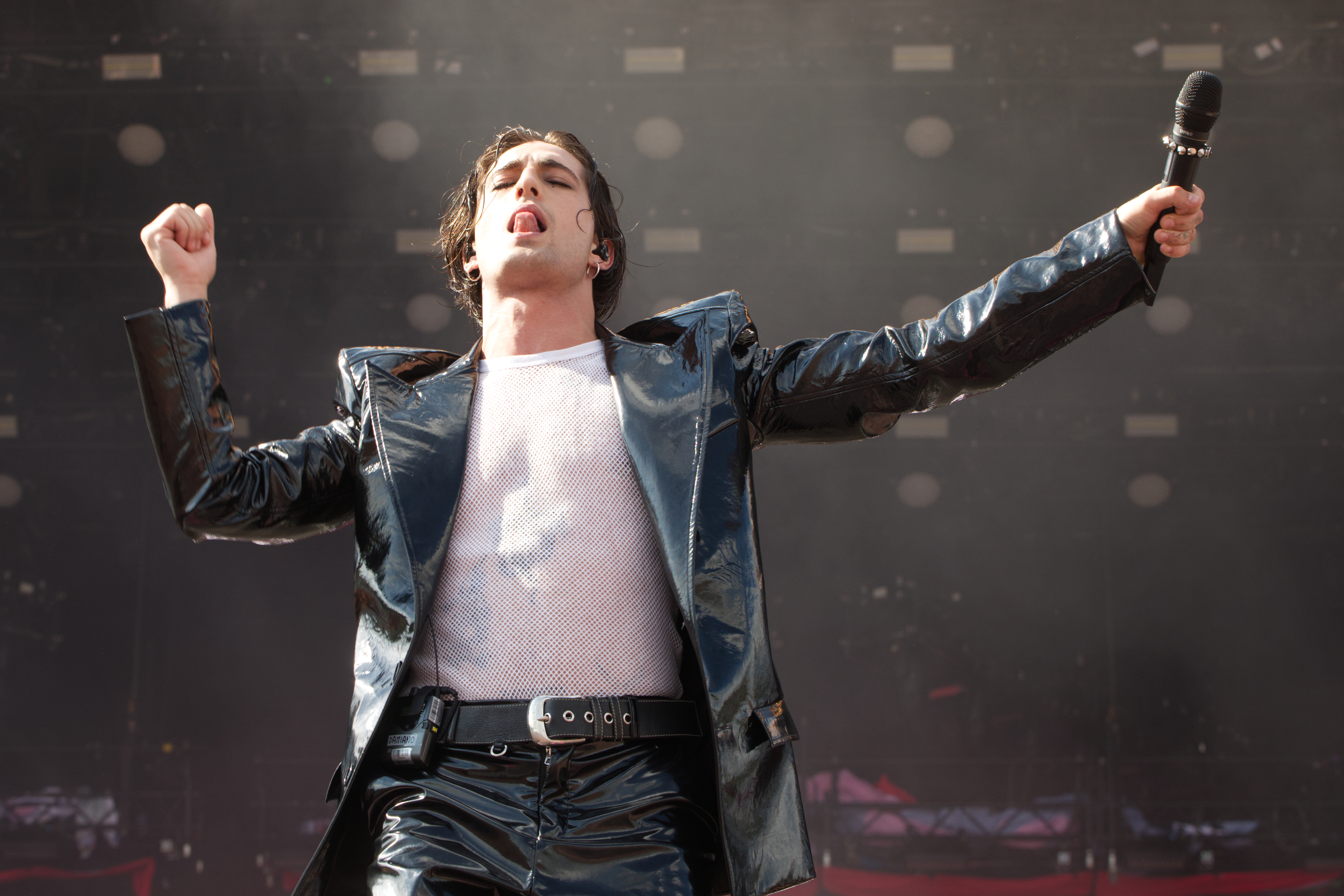
Damiano David

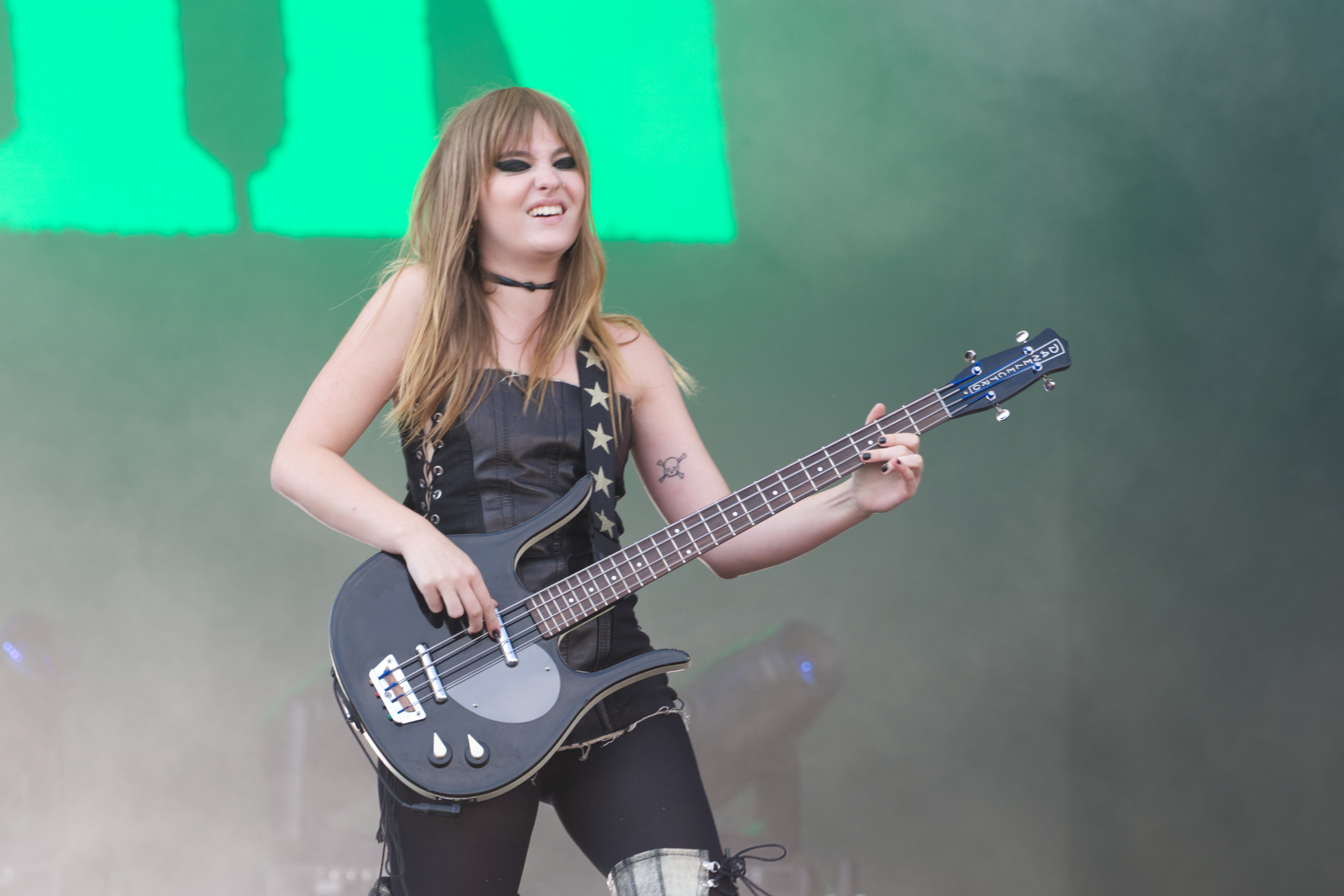
Victoria De Angelis

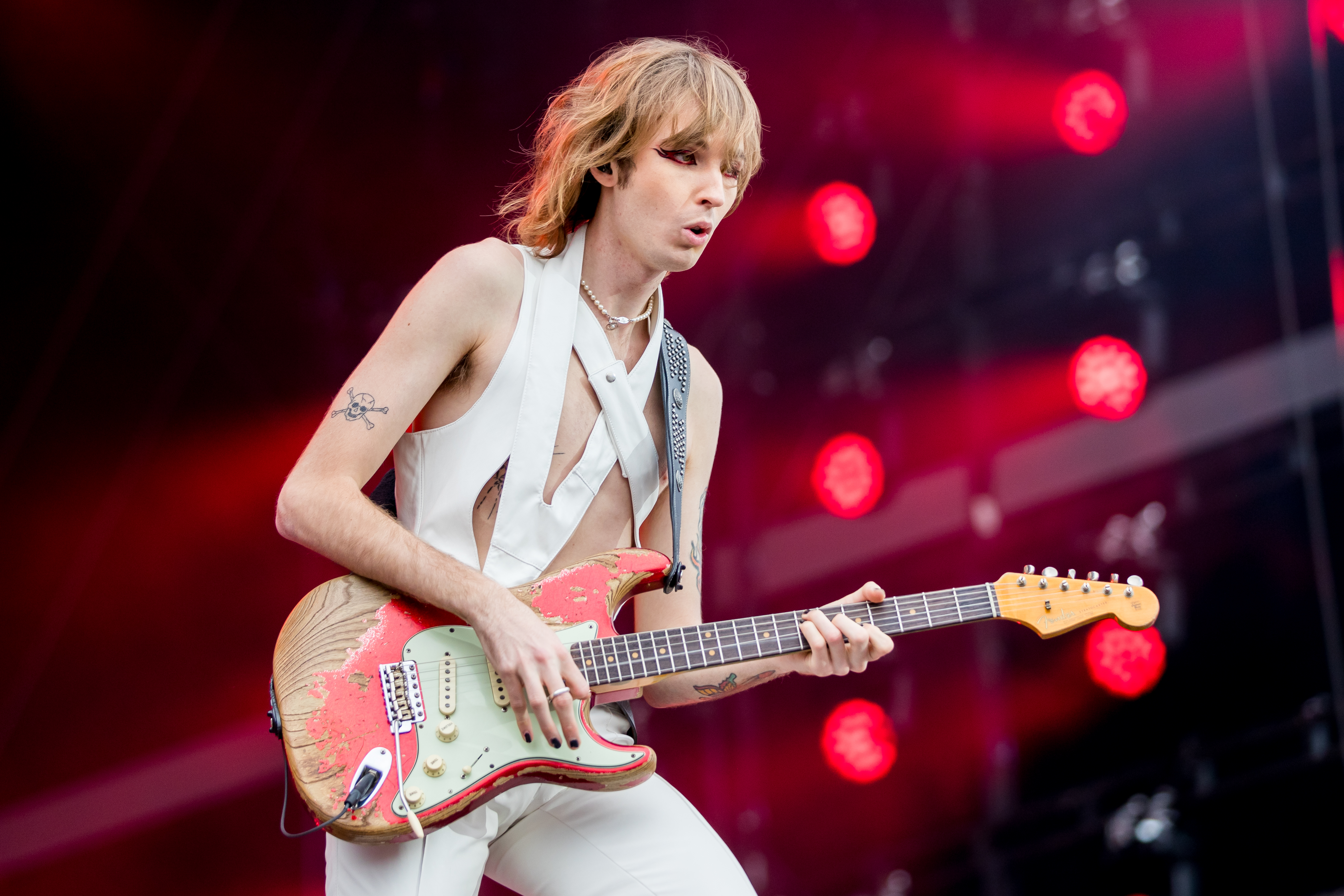
Thomas Raggi

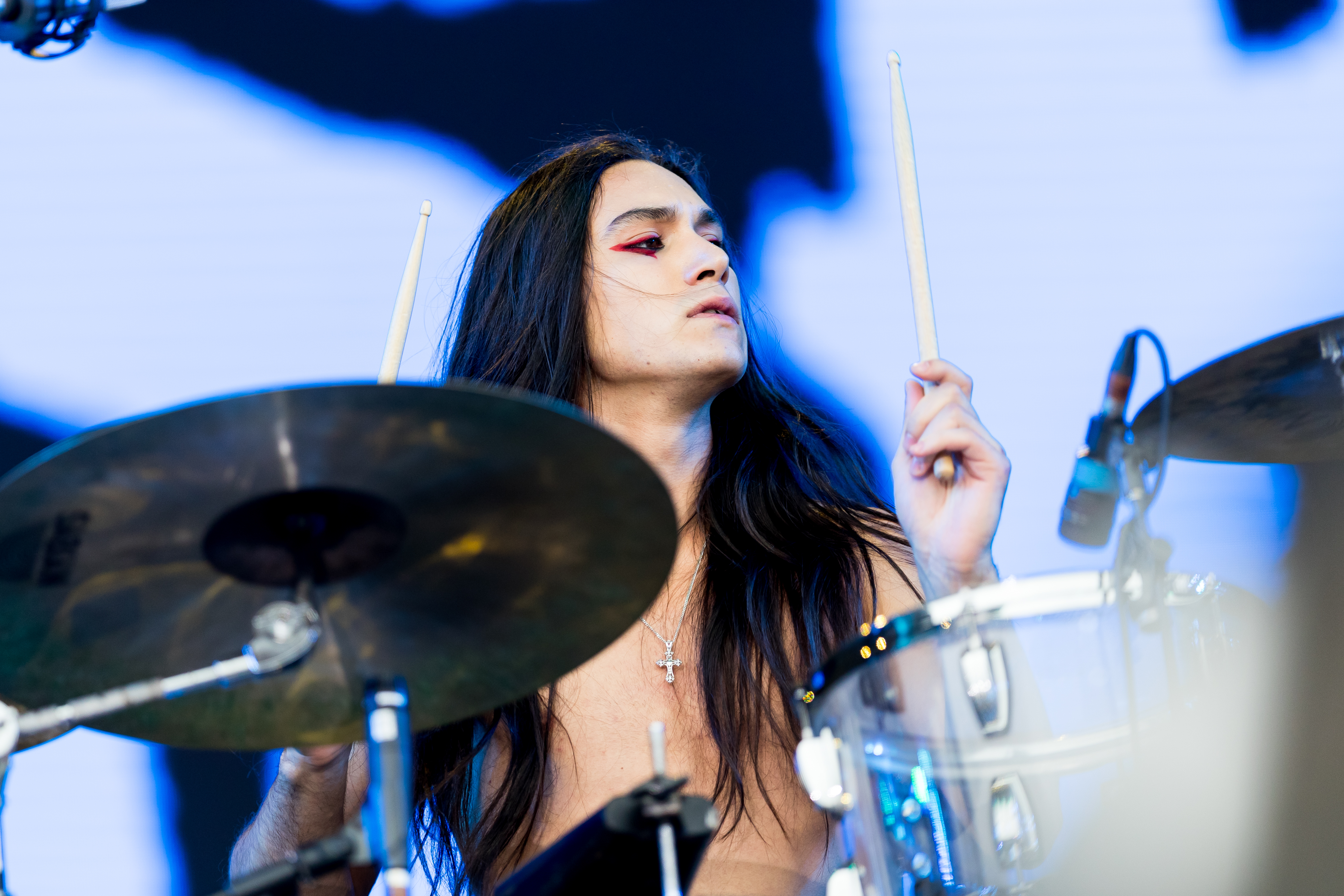
Ethan Torchio

- Damiano David – lead vocals, occasional guitars
- Thomas Raggi - guitars
- Ethan Torchio - drums, percussion, guitars
- Victoria De Angelis – bass, backing vocals

== Discography ==
Studio albums

- Il ballo della vita (2018)
- Teatro d'ira: Vol. I (2021)
- Rush! (2023)

== Filmography ==
Films
Year	Title	Role	Notes	Ref.
2018	This Is Måneskin	Themselves	Documentary	

Television
Year	Title	Role	Notes
2017	X Factor	Contestants	Runner-up (season 11)
2021	The Ellen DeGeneres Show	Themselves (musical guest)	Episode: 8 November 2021
2022	Saturday Night Live	Themselves	Episode: "Will Forte/Måneskin"
2022	Sanremo Music Festival	Themselves (musical guest)	First night: 1 February 2022
2022	Eurovision Song Contest 2022	Themselves (musical guest)	Final: 14 May 2022
2022	The Tonight Show Starring Jimmy Fallon	Themselves (musical guest)	Episode: 20 May 2022
2023	The Tonight Show Starring Jimmy Fallon	Themselves (interview and musical guest with Tom Morello)	Episode: 26 January 2023
2023	The Late Late Show with James Corden	Themselves (musical guest)	Episode: 31 January 2023
2023	Sanremo Music Festival	Themselves (musical guest with Tom Morello)	Third night: 9 February 2023

== Tours ==
- Il Ballo della Vita Tour (2018–2019)
- Loud Kids Tour (2022–2023)
- Rush! World Tour (2023)

== Awards and nominations ==
Year	Award	Category	Work	Result
2018	Wind Music Awards	Album Award	Chosen	Won
2018	Wind Music Awards	Single Award	"Chosen"	Won
2019	SEAT Music Awards	Album Award	Il ballo della vita	Won
2019	SEAT Music Awards	Single Award	"Torna a casa"	Won
2019	SEAT Music Awards	Live Award	Il ballo della vita tour	Won
2019	Nickelodeon Kids' Choice Awards	Italian Favourite Artist	Themselves	Nominated
2021	Sanremo Music Festival	Big Artists	"Zitti e buoni"	1st place
2021	Eurovision Song Contest	—N/a	"Zitti e buoni"	1st place
2021	LOS40 Music Awards	Best International New Act	Themselves	Nominated
2021	NRJ Music Awards	International Group/Duo of the Year	Themselves	Nominated
2021	MTV Europe Music Awards	Best Group	Themselves	Nominated
2021	MTV Europe Music Awards	Best Rock	Themselves	Won
2021	MTV Europe Music Awards	Best Italian Act	Themselves	Nominated
2021	American Music Awards	Favorite Trending Song	"Beggin'"	Nominated
2021	Danish Music Awards	International Hit of the Year	"I Wanna Be Your Slave"	Nominated
2022	Berlin Music Video Awards	Most Trashy	"Mammamia"	Nominated
2022	Brit Awards	International Group	Themselves	Nominated
2022	Brit Awards	International Song of the Year	"I Wanna Be Your Slave"	Nominated
2022	Premios Odeón	Best International New Artist	Themselves	Won
2022	iHeartRadio Music Awards	Best New Pop Artist	Themselves	Nominated
2022	iHeartRadio Music Awards	Best New Alternative Artist	Themselves	Won
2022	iHeartRadio Music Awards	TikTok Bop of the Year	"Beggin'"	Nominated
2022	NME Awards	Best Band in the World	Themselves	Nominated
2022	Billboard Music Awards	Top Rock Artist	Themselves	Nominated
2022	Billboard Music Awards	Top Rock Song	"Beggin'"	Won
2022	Swiss Music Awards	Best International Group	Themselves	Nominated
2022	Swiss Music Awards	Best International Breaking Act	Themselves	Nominated
2022	Žebřík Music Awards	Best International Discovery	Themselves	1st place
2022	Žebřík Music Awards	Best International Action	Themselves, "Rock for People Hope"	1st place
2022	MTV Video Music Awards	Best New Artist	Themselves	Nominated
2022	MTV Video Music Awards	Best Alternative	"I Wanna Be Your Slave"	Won
2022	MTV Video Music Awards	Group of the Year	Themselves	Nominated
2022	TIM Music Awards	Special Award for Achievements in the World	Themselves	Won
2022	MTV Europe Music Awards	Best Rock	Themselves	Nominated
2022	MTV Europe Music Awards	Best Italian Act	Themselves	Nominated
2022	NRJ Music Awards	International Group/Duo of the Year	Themselves	Nominated
2022	American Music Awards	New Artist of the Year	Themselves	Nominated
2022	American Music Awards	Favorite Pop Duo or Group	Themselves	Nominated
2022	American Music Awards	Favorite Rock Artist	Themselves	Nominated
2022	American Music Awards	Favorite Rock Song	"Beggin'"	Won
2022	UK Music Video Awards	Best Rock Video - International	"Supermodel"	Nominated
2022	MTV Video Music Awards Japan	Best New Artist Video – International	"Supermodel"	Won
2022	People's Choice Awards	The Group of 2022	Themselves	Nominated
2023	Grammy Awards	Best New Artist	Themselves	Nominated
2023	iHeartRadio Music Awards	Best Duo/Group of the Year	Themselves	Nominated
2023	iHeartRadio Music Awards	Alternative Artist of the Year	Themselves	Nominated
2023	MTV Video Music Awards	Best Rock Video	"The Loneliest"	Won
2023	MTV Video Music Awards	Group of the Year	Themselves	Nominated
2023	MTV Europe Music Awards	Best Group	Themselves	Nominated
2023	MTV Europe Music Awards	Best Rock	Themselves	Won
2023	MTV Europe Music Awards	Best Live	Themselves	Nominated
2023	MTV Europe Music Awards	Best Italian Act	Themselves	Won
2023	NRJ Music Awards	International Group/Duo of the Year	Themselves	Nominated
2023	NRJ Music Awards	International Song of the Year	"The Loneliest"	Nominated
2023	NRJ Music Awards	International Video of the Year	"The Loneliest"	Nominated
2023	NRJ Music Awards	Most Played Artist on Radio	Themselves	Won
2024	iHeartRadio Music Awards	Best Duo/Group of the Year	Themselves	Nominated
2024	iHeartRadio Music Awards	Favorite Tour Style	Rush! World Tour	Nominated

== Notes ==
Awards
Preceded by Diodato	Sanremo Music Festival winner 2021	Succeeded by Mahmood and Blanco
Preceded by Diodato with "Fai rumore"	Italy in the Eurovision Song Contest; 2021	Succeeded by Mahmood and Blanco with "Brividi"
Preceded by (Netherlands) Duncan Laurence with "Arcade" (2019)	Winner of the Eurovision Song Contest; 2021	Succeeded by (Ukraine) Kalush Orchestra with "Stefania"
