= Straight No Chaser =

Straight No Chaser may refer to:

== Music ==
=== Songs ===
- "Straight, No Chaser" (composition), 1951, by jazz musician Thelonious Monk
- "Straight No Chaser", a song by Bush from the album Razorblade Suitcase

=== Albums ===
- Straight, No Chaser (Thelonious Monk album), 1967
- Straight, No Chaser (Joe Henderson album), 1968
- Straight No Chaser (Mr Hudson album), 2009
- Straight, No Chaser (Reks album) and its title track, 2012

=== Groups ===
- Straight No Chaser (group), an American a cappella group
- Straight No Chaser, former name of the college a cappella group Another Round

=== Other media ===
- Straight No Chaser (magazine), a British music magazine
- Thelonious Monk: Straight, No Chaser, a 1988 documentary film

== Other uses ==
- A combination of two common bartending terms

== See also ==
- Straight No Chase, a 1998 album by Dungeon Family associates P.A.
