= Zombie Lady =

2025 single by Damiano David

Single by Damiano David

from the album Funny Little Fears
- Released: 16 May 2025
- Genre: Pop rock; synth-pop
- Length: 3:08
- Label: Sony Italy; Arista
- Songwriters: Damiano David; Jason Evigan; Sarah Hudson; Mark Schick; Cleo Tighe
- Producers: Jason Evigan; Mark Schick

Damiano David singles chronology
"Next Summer" (2025)	"Zombie Lady" (2025)	"The First Time" (2025)

Music video
- "Zombie Lady" on YouTube

"Zombie Lady" is a song by Italian singer and songwriter Damiano David. It was released through Sony Music Italy and Arista Records on 16 May 2025, as the fourth single from his debut studio album, Funny Little Fears (2025). He wrote the song alongside Jason Evigan, Sarah Hudson, Mark Schick, and Cleo Tighe, with Evigan and Schick also producing the track. It features uncredited vocals from American singer and actress Dove Cameron, David's wife. The song is a dark romantic ballad which blends gothic imagery with ideas of a forever kind of love that is emotional and intense. The song became David's second number one single in Poland.

== Background and release ==
After rising to fame as the frontman of the rock band Måneskin, winning the 2021 Eurovision Song Contest, and releasing three studio albums, David began his solo career with the release of "Silverlines" and "Born with a Broken Heart", as well as a cover version of Mark Ronson and Miley Cyrus' "Nothing Breaks Like a Heart" for Valentine's Day 2025. The singer reported that he would be embarking on his first solo concert tour in 2025. At an intimate show in New York, he previewed the songs "Next Summer", "Voices", and "The Bruise", which he confirmed would all appear on his then-untitled debut album.

Funny Little Fears was officially announced on 12 March 2025, with "Zombie Lady" featuring as the third track. The song was released to online platforms and radio stations as the album's fourth single on 16 March 2025.

== Composition ==
"Zombie Lady" is an '80s-inspired atmospheric pop rock song featuring driving beats, moody synths, gritty guitar riffs, and David's emotive vocals, which are paired with the ethereal backing vocals of American singer Dove Cameron. Lyrically, the song details a haunting yet romantic love which evokes a mix of obsession and devotion. The song includes two references the 2005 animated film Corpse Bride, naming both main characters Emily and Victor (with David comparing himself and his lover to the couple), and alluding to the scene near the end of the film where Emily turns into a kaleidoscope of butterflies.

In an interview with the Los Angeles Times, David confirmed that the film was the primary inspiration for the song, stating “I'm a big fan of Tim Burton's movie] Corpse Bride, and I always rooted for the zombie lady somehow. I was watching it with my girlfriend, and I thought: What would happen if I was with another girl and she popped out from a grave?"

== Music video ==
An official visual video for the song premiered on 16 May 2025.

== Charts ==
=== Weekly charts ===
Weekly chart performance for "Zombie Lady"
Chart (2025–2026)	Peak position
Belgium (Ultratop 50 Wallonia)	40
CIS Airplay (TopHit)	96
Croatia International Airplay (Top lista)	44
Czech Republic Airplay (ČNS IFPI)	11
Italy Airplay (EarOne)	5
Poland (Polish Airplay Top 100)	1
US Hot Rock & Alternative Songs (Billboard)	50

=== Year-end charts ===
Year-end chart performance for "Zombie Lady"
Chart (2025)	Position
Poland (Polish Airplay Top 100)	14

== Cover versions ==
In 2026, Italian composer Giacomo Bucci included an orchestral arrangement of "Zombie Lady" on Mainstream Overtures, his album of orchestral reinterpretations of contemporary pop hits, released on 6 March 2026.
