= Funny Little Fears World Tour =

2025 concert tour by Damiano David

- Tour by Damiano David
- Promotional poster for the tour
- Location: Asia; Australia; Europe; North America; South America
- Associated album: Funny Little Fears
- Start date: 11 September 2025
- End date: 16 December 2025
- Legs: 1
- No. of shows: 34

The Funny Little Fears World Tour was a concert tour by Italian singer Damiano David, in support of his debut studio album, Funny Little Fears (2025). Consisting of 34 shows, it passed through Asia, Australia, Europe, North America, and South America. The tour began in Warsaw, Poland, on 11 September 2025, and concluded in Silver Spring, Maryland, United States, on 16 December 2025.

== Background ==
Damiano David launched his solo musical career with his debut single, "Silverlines", in September 2024, followed by "Born with a Broken Heart" in October. On 9 December 2024, David announced that he would be embarking on his first solo concert tour in the following year. General sale began on 16 December, five days after the ticket presales. After the initial 31 dates, shows in London and New York were added due to high demand, and venues in Barcelona, Madrid, Paris, and Toronto were upgraded. In a press release, David stated: "I'm absolutely blown away by your response to this tour so far. I cannot wait to sing and dance with you all next year."

== Shows ==
List of concerts, showing date, city, country, and venue
| Date (2025) | City | Country | Venue |
|---|---|---|---|
| 11 September | Warsaw | Poland | COS Torwar |
| 13 September | Berlin | Germany | Uber Eats Music Hall |
| 15 September | Amsterdam | Netherlands | AFAS Live |
| 17 September | Cologne | Germany | Palladium Köln |
| 21 September | Barcelona | Spain | Sant Jordi Club |
| 22 September | Madrid | Spain | Movistar Arena |
| 26 September | Paris | France | Adidas Arena |
| 28 September | London | England | Roundhouse |
| 29 September | London | England | Roundhouse |
| 2 October | Brussels | Belgium | Forest National |
| 4 October | Zurich | Switzerland | Halle 622 |
| 7 October | Milan | Italy | Unipol Forum |
| 11 October | Rome | Italy | Palazzo dello Sport |
| 12 October | Rome | Italy | Palazzo dello Sport |
| 22 October | Sydney | Australia | Enmore Theatre |
| 24 October | Melbourne | Australia | Forum Melbourne |
| 27 October | Tokyo | Japan | Tokyo Garden Theater |
| 29 October | Osaka | Japan | Zepp Osaka Bayside |
| 7 November | São Paulo | Brazil | Tokio Marine Hall |
| 9 November | Santiago | Chile | Teatro Caupolicán |
| 11 November | Buenos Aires | Argentina | Complejo C Art Media |
| 13 November | Bogotá | Colombia | Teatro Royal Center |
| 17 November | Mexico City | Mexico | Auditorio BB |
| 21 November | Seattle | United States | Paramount Theatre |
| 23 November | San Francisco | United States | The Masonic |
| 25 November | Los Angeles | United States | The Wiltern |
| 29 November | Chicago | United States | Riviera Theatre |
| 30 November | Detroit | United States | The Fillmore Detroit |
| 2 December | Toronto | Canada | Coca-Cola Coliseum |
| 4 December | Montreal | Canada | M Telus |
| 6 December | Philadelphia | United States | The Fillmore |
| 8 December | Brooklyn | United States | Brooklyn Paramount |
| 9 December | Brooklyn | United States | Brooklyn Paramount |
| 16 December | Silver Spring | United States | The Fillmore |
