= Another Round (disambiguation) =

Another Round is a 2020 Danish film.

Another Round may also refer to:

- Another Round (album), a 2010 album and the title song by Jaheim
- Another Round, a 2002 album by The Irish Rovers
- "Another Round" (Fat Joe song), 2011
- Another Round (group), a collegiate a cappella group
- Another Round (podcast), a podcast hosted by Tracy Clayton and Heben Nigatu
