= Christmas Cheer =

Christmas Cheer or variants may refer to:

== Film and TV ==
- "Christmas Cheers", an episode of Cheers

== Music ==
- Christmas Cheer, a 1996 album by Ken Navarro
- Christmas Cheer, a 2008 album by The Boxmasters
- "Christmas Cheer (Everything's Going to be Alright)", a song by Strawbs from album The Broken Hearted Bride
- Christmas Cheers, a 2009 album by Straight No Chaser

== See also ==
- "Saucy Limericks & Christmas Cheer", a poem by Kenneth Rexroth
