= With a Twist =

With a Twist may refer to:

- A twist, a type of cocktail garnish
- With a Twist (Todd Rundgren album)
- With a Twist (Straight No Chaser album)
- With a Twist, album by Alison Limerick 1994
