= What Christmas Means to Me =

American Christmas song (various)

Song by Stevie Wonder

from the album Someday at Christmas
- Published: 1967
- Genre: Christmas
- Length: 2:25
- Label: Tamla
- Composers: Allen Story, Anna Gordy Gaye, George Gordy
- Lyricists: Allen Story, Anna Gordy Gaye, George Gordy

"What Christmas Means to Me" is a Christmas song written by Allen Story, Anna Gordy Gaye, and George Gordy and performed by Stevie Wonder. It was included on B-side of Wonder's eighth studio album Someday at Christmas published in 1967. The most-covered version was It has been recorded by many artists, including Paul Young, Pentatonix, Cher and re-recorded by Wonder with John Legend for A Legendary Christmas.

== Critical reception ==
The original Wonder version of "What Christmas Means to Me" received positive reviews from music critics. The song was included on Billboard's list of "The 100 Best Christmas Songs of All Time"; Billboard's writer Jason Lipshutz wrote that the song "moves briskly enough to not get bogged down in sentimentality, but tons of emotional modern holiday songs" with "a jaunty piano line, tinkling bells and his signature harmonica". The Daily Telegraph prised the "slippery Funk Brothers bass propping up a prominent snare drum", on a "upbeat melody before blowing us out with harmonica playing that is ripe with earthly delights".

== Charts ==
=== Stevie Wonder version ===
==== Weekly charts ====
Weekly chart performance for "What Christmas Means to Me" by Stevie Wonder
Chart (1967–2024)	Peak position
Australia (ARIA)	45
France (SNEP)	84
Global 200 (Billboard)	89
Lithuania (AGATA)	89
Netherlands (Single Top 100)	54
Portugal (AFP)	169
Switzerland (Schweizer Hitparade)	72
UK Singles (Official Charts)	57
US Holiday 100 (Billboard)	42
US Digital Song Sales (Billboard)	40
US R&B/Hip-Hop Streaming Songs (Billboard)	42

==== All-time charts ====
All-time chart performance for "What Christmas Means to Me" by Stevie Wonder
Chart	Position
US Holiday 100 (Billboard)	95

==== Certifications ====
Certifications for "What Christmas Means to Me" by Stevie Wonder
Region	Certification	Certified units/sales
New Zealand (RMNZ)	Gold	15,000^{‡}
United Kingdom (BPI)	Gold	400,000^{‡}
^{‡} Sales+streaming figures based on certification alone.

=== Pentatonix version ===
==== Weekly charts ====
Weekly chart performance for "What Christmas Means to Me" by Pentatonix
Chart (2018)	Peak position
Canada AC (Billboard)	39
Canada Hot AC (Billboard)	50
US Adult Contemporary (Billboard)	6
US Holiday Digital Song Sales (Billboard)	26

=== John Legend and Stevie Wonder version ===
==== Weekly charts ====
Weekly chart performance for "What Christmas Means to Me" by John Legend and Stevie Wonder
Chart (2018–2025)	Peak position
Canada AC (Billboard)	7
Global 200 (Billboard)	91
Italy (FIMI)	97
Netherlands (Single Top 100)	64
Portugal (AFP)	103
US Bubbling Under Hot 100 (Billboard)	1
US Holiday 100 (Billboard)	34
US Hot R&B/Hip-Hop Songs (Billboard)	49
US Streaming Songs (Billboard)	32
US Christian Airplay (Billboard)	46

==== All-time charts ====
All-time chart performance for "What Christmas Means to Me" by Stevie Wonder
Chart	Position
US Holiday 100 (Billboard)	76

== Cher version ==
"What Christmas Means to Me"

Song by Cher and Stevie Wonder

from the album Christmas
- Released: October 20, 2023
- Length: 2:35
- Label: Warner
- Songwriters: Anna Gaye; Allen Story; George Gordy
- Producer: Mark Taylor

Audio video
- "What Christmas Means to Me" on YouTube

American singer Cher's version of the song featuring Stevie Wonder was recorded for her 2023 album Christmas.

=== Charts ===
Weekly chart performance for "What Christmas Means to Me"
Chart (2023–2024)	Peak position
Canada AC (Billboard)	4
France (SNEP)	163
Ireland (IRMA)	94
New Zealand Hot Singles (RMNZ)	21
Sweden (Sverigetopplistan)	57
UK Singles (Official Charts)	95

== Other cover versions ==
- Paul Young (1992) on A Very Special Christmas 2
- Hanson (1997) on Snowed In
- Mary-Kate and Ashley Olsen with Sean Holt (1999) on Cool Yule: A Christmas Party With Friends
- En Vogue (2002) on The Gift of Christmas
- Holiday Express (2002) on Live
- Jessica Simpson (2004) on ReJoyce: The Christmas Album
- Natalie Grant (2005) on Believe
- Charm City Sound (2007) on Christmas Lights
- Darlene Love (2007) on It's Christmas, Of Course
- Mandisa (2007) on Christmas Joy EP - also appeared on It's Christmas in 2008
- Jason Yeager (2008) on My Christmas Wish
- Overboard (2008) on Tidings
- Sensational Soul Cruisers (2008) on Save Your Soul EP
- Rahsaan Patterson (2008) on The Ultimate Gift
- Michael McDonald (2009) on This Christmas – listed as "That's What Christmas Means to Me"
- Karel King (2010) on Lights, Love, and Laughter
- Trijntje Oosterhuis (2010) on This Is The Season
- University of Wisconsin Madhatters (2010) on Cheer On Tap
- Nick Lachey featuring The Sing-Off Contestants (2010) on The Sing Off: Season 2, Episode 5, The Finale
- Coastline (2011) on An Undeniably Merry Coastline Christmas
- J Grace (2011) on Christmas Eve
- CeeLo Green (2012) on Cee Lo's Magic Moment
- The Empty Pockets (2012) on A Holiday Staycation
- Rhonda Thomas (2012) on Little Drummer Girl
- Klarc Whitson
- Sugarlick
- Sugar Beats on A Sugar Beats Christmas – Cool Christmas Songs for Kids
- Ballroom Orchestra & Singers
- Jennette McCurdy in the 2012 Macy's Thanksgiving Day Parade.
- Two Angels (2013) on How Angels Celebrate Christmas
- Train (2015) on Christmas in Tahoe
- The Mrs (2015) single release
- Straight No Chaser (2016) on I'll Have Another... Christmas Album
- Pentatonix (2018) on Christmas Is Here!
- John Legend (2018) on A Legendary Christmas
- Ginger Root (2018) as a single release
- Gaia (2021) as a single release
- Joss Stone (2022) on Merry Christmas, Love
- Hannah Waddingham (2023) on Hannah Waddingham: Home For Christmas
- Cher (2023) on Christmas
- Tyler Shaw (2024) on A Tyler Shaw Christmas

== Similar titles ==
- "What Christmas Means to Me" - written by Chiquita Mullins, Claude Hill, Moses Dillard, and Sharon Michalsky
  - Al Green (1983) on The Christmas Album – also appeared on White Christmas in 1986
- "What Christmas Means to Me" - written by Steve Romanoff
  - Schooner Fare (1987) on Home for the Holidays
- "What Christmas Means to Me" - written by Joey Miskulin
  - Frankie Yankovic (1994) on Christmas Memories
- "What Christmas Means to Me" - written by Bob Stewart
  - Karen Newman (1994) on What Christmas Means to Me
- "What Christmas Means to Me" - written by Amayz
  - Amayz (2007) on Everyday Like Christmas
- "That's What Christmas Means to Me" - written by Nick Acquaviva and Ted Varnick
  - Eddie Fisher (1952) on Christmas with Eddie Fisher
- "That's What Christmas Means to Me" - written by Wendell B
  - Wendell B (2007) on Save a Little Room for Me
- "That's What Christmas Means to Me" - written by Harry Revel
  - Featured in the film It Happened on Fifth Avenue (1947)
- "That's What Christmas Means to Me" - written by Jerome Schoolar
  - Biscuit Brothers (2007) on Have a Merry Musical Christmas
