= Sarah Hudson =

American singer

- Born: Sarah Theresa Hudson; March 24, 1984 (age 42); Los Angeles, California, U.S.
- Occupation: Singer-songwriter
- Years active: 2003–present
- Father: Mark Hudson
- Relatives: Bill Hudson (uncle); Brett Hudson (uncle); Oliver Hudson (cousin); Kate Hudson (cousin)
- Musical career
- Genres: Pop; rock; club; electronica
- Labels: EMI; S-Curve

Sarah Theresa Hudson (born March 24, 1984) is an American pop singer-songwriter, and creator of the club-pop music project Ultraviolet Sound.

== Music career ==
=== 2004–2006: Debut album ===
Hudson's previous record label, S-Curve Records, folded before her debut album, Naked Truth (2004), was officially released. Collaborators include Desmond Child, Eric Bazilian, Billy Mann, Ozzy Osbourne and Aerosmith vocalist Steven Tyler. In conjunction with the album, Hudson was featured in Interview, Women's Wear Daily, YM, Seventeen, Teen Vogue and Elle.

=== 2007–2011: Ultraviolet Sound ===
Work began in early 2007 on Hudson's new "club pop" music project under the name Ultraviolet Sound. The group, also known as UVS, released their first full-length record, O.C.D. (Obsessive Compulsive Dancing), in April 2009 independently. The band secured sponsorship of O.C.D from Adidas Originals and garnered a total of 135,000 downloads. UVS released another album worldwide in 2011 entitled "Ultraviolet Sound". Their first single "Suck My Kiss" was released digitally on iTunes along with three remixes. Followed by the release of their second single "Girl Talk" which was the #1 release at Top 40 radio from an independent label in 2011, playing on over 50 Top 40 stations. In 2012, they released a collaboration with DJ Kill The Noise called "Dying". UVS played a 35-city US tour with Family Force 5, shows with DJs Kill The Noise, Treasure Fingers, Ludachrist, SebastiAn, Kavinsky and more. They also played several one-off shows with Lady Gaga, a SXSW performance on a bill with Robyn, N.E.R.D, Katy Perry and shows with many other top artists. They received multiple posts from celebrity blogger Perez Hilton, and heard their cover of "Two of Hearts" in rotation on top dance stations around the country. Ultraviolet Sound took their music international in March 2010 with a 20-date U.K. tour. Sarah had a featuring and co-write on EDM artist Brillz's record called "Fuzzy Peach" and EDM artists Kill The Noise and Brillz's record "Saturn" which was released on Skrillex's label OWSLA, featured in Rolling Stone and continues to be played by high-profile DJs around the world.

=== Present: Songwriting and a solo project ===
Sarah Hudson is currently signed to Prescription Songs/AAM as a songwriter. A song she co-wrote with Katy Perry, Dr. Luke, Max Martin and Cirkut entitled "Dark Horse" became Perry's third single off her album, Prism. "Dark Horse" has been a commercial success, charting at number one on the US Billboard Hot 100. The song topped the charts for four weeks straight and has sold 7.9 million copies so far, making it one of the top-selling digital singles of all time. Sarah also co-wrote "Black Widow" by Iggy Azalea and Rita Ora which has recently been certified 2× platinum by the RIAA and peaked at number three on the US Billboard Hot 100 charts. Hudson has currently penned "Get On Your Knees" by Nicki Minaj featuring Ariana Grande, "Swish Swish" by Katy Perry & Nicki Minaj, "The Feeling" by Justin Bieber featuring Halsey, "Banshee" by Santigold, "San Francisco" by 5 Seconds of Summer and many more cuts on the hit records of today. On April 7, 2017, Hudson released a solo EP titled Songs from the Sea.

== Television career ==
Hudson was featured on Frontline in its report "The Way The Music Died." She has also appeared on a Season 1 episode of Project Runway, during a challenge where the contestants had to design a rocker fashion with which she would portray her image. She was touted as an "up and coming rock star".

== Discography ==
=== Albums ===
- 2004: Naked Truth
- 2009: O.C.D. (Obsessive Compulsive Dancing) (as Ultraviolet Sound)
- 2011: Ultraviolet Sound (as Ultraviolet Sound)

=== Extended plays ===
- 2007: Fast, Cheap and Out of Control (as Ultraviolet Sound)
- 2017: Songs from the Sea (as Sarah Hudson)

=== Singles ===
- 2005: "Girl on the Verge" (as Sarah Hudson)
- 2011: "Suck My Kiss" (as Ultraviolet Sound)
- 2011: "Girl Talk" (as Ultraviolet Sound)
- 2012: "Neon Child" (as Ultraviolet Sound)

=== Music videos ===
- 2005: "Girl on the Verge" (as Sarah Hudson)
- 2009: "Gimme My Electro" (as Ultraviolet Sound)
- 2011: "Suck My Kiss" (as Ultraviolet Sound)
- 2011: "Girl Talk" (as Ultraviolet Sound)
- 2011: "Video Megamix" (as Ultraviolet Sound)

=== Songwriting credits ===
Year	Artist	Song	Album	Ref.
2003	Nika	"Pieza Perfecta"	Quién Dijo Que Era El Fin	
2007	Ashley Tisdale	"Unlove You"	Headstrong	
2008	Jeffree Star	"Miss Boombox"	Cupcakes Taste Like Violence - EP	
2009	Jeffree Star	"Beauty Killer"	Beauty Killer	
2012	Jeffree Star	"Blow Me"	Virginity - EP	
2012	Kill The Noise	"Saturn" feat. Brillz and Sarah Hudson	Blvck Mvgic - EP	
2013	Katy Perry	"Dark Horse" feat. Juicy J	Prism	
2014	Sidibe	"Cry of the Wild"	Metaphysical - EP	
2014	Iggy Azalea	"Black Widow" feat. Rita Ora	The New Classic	
2014	Ferras	"Speak in Tongues"	Ferras - EP	
2014	Ferras	"Champagne"	Ferras - EP	
2014	Ferras	"King of Sabotage"	Ferras - EP	
2014	Ferras	"Legends Never Die" feat. Katy Perry	Ferras - EP	
2014	Nicki Minaj	"Get on Your Knees" feat. Ariana Grande	The Pinkprint	
2015	Jussie Smollett	"Born To Love U"	Empire: Season 2 Soundtrack	
2015	5 Seconds of Summer	"San Francisco"	Sounds Good Feels Good	
2015	Justin Bieber	"The Feeling" feat. Halsey	Purpose	
2015	Katy Perry	"Every Day Is a Holiday"	Non-album single	
2016	Santigold	"Banshee"	99¢	
2016	Andy Black	"Drown Me Out"	The Shadow Side	
2016	Andy Black	"The Void"	The Shadow Side	
2016	Tommie Sunshine	"Can't Get Enough" with Halfway House	Non-album single	
2016	Idina Menzel	"Queen of Swords"	Idina	
2016	Bro Safari	"Reality" feat. Sarah Hudson	Collisions - EP	
2016	Liz	"Cross Your Heart"	Cross Your Heart	
2017	Erika Jayne	"Xxpensive"	Non-album single	
2017	Charli XCX	"Babygirl" feat. Uffie	Number 1 Angel	
2017	New Kids on the Block	"Thankful"	Thankful - EP	
2017	Helene Fischer	"Wir brechen das Schweigen"	Helene Fischer	
2017	Katy Perry	"Swish Swish" feat. Nicki Minaj	Witness	
2017	Dua Lipa	"Genesis"	Dua Lipa	
2017	Katy Perry	"Hey Hey Hey"	Witness	
2017	Katy Perry	"Mind Maze"	Witness	
2017	Katy Perry	"Miss You More"	Witness	
2017	Katy Perry	"Tsunami"	Witness	
2017	Katy Perry	"Bigger Than Me"	Witness	
2017	Katy Perry	"Pendulum"	Witness	
2017	Katy Perry	"Dance With the Devil"	Witness	
2017	Katy Perry	"Act My Age"	Witness	
2017	Adam Lambert	"Two Fux"	Non-album single	
2017	Dev	"Come At Me"	I Only See You When I'm Dreamin'	
2017	Superfruit	"Fantasy" feat. Amber Liu	Future Friends	
2017	Snails	"Into The Light" feat. Sarah Hudson	The Shell	
2018	The Neighbourhood	"Dust"	To Imagine - EP	
2018	The Neighbourhood	"Heaven"	To Imagine - EP	
2018	Camila Cabello	"Something's Gotta Give"	Camila	
2018	Ferras	"Coming Back Around"	Non-album single	
2018	The Neighbourhood	"Blue"	The Neighbourhood	
2018	Tinashe	"Salt"	Joyride	
2018	Liz	"Super Duper Nova"	Non-album single	
2018	LSDREAM	"Godspeed" feat. Sarah Hudson	Voyager	
2018	Ghost	"Pro Memoria"	Prequelle	
2018	J Soul Brothers	"Future" with BloodPop	Future	
2018	Years & Years	"Palo Santo"	Palo Santo	
2018	Years & Years	"Karma"	Palo Santo	
2018	Against the Current	"Personal"	Past Lives	
2018	Liz	"Pandemonium"	Non-album single	
2018	Against the Current	"Voices"	Past Lives	
2018	The Knocks	"Retrograded"	New York Narcotic	
2018	Kim Petras	"Close Your Eyes"	Turn Off The Light, Vol. 1 - EP	
2018	Kim Petras	"Turn Off the Light" feat. Elvira, Mistress of the Dark	Turn Off The Light, Vol. 1 - EP	
2018	Kim Petras	"Tell Me It's a Nightmare"	Turn Off The Light, Vol. 1 - EP	
2018	Kim Petras	"In the Next Life"	Turn Off The Light, Vol. 1 - EP	
2018	Alma	"Cowboy"	Non-album single	
2018	Brooke Candy	"Nuts" feat. Lil Aaron	Non-album single	
2018	Little Mix	"The National Manthem"	LM5	
2018	Sasha Alex Sloan	"Version of Me"	Loser - EP	
2019	LSDREAM	"Om Namo" feat. Sarah Hudson	Renegades of Light	
2019	Julian David	"17 Für Die Ewigkeit"	Ohne Limit	
2019	Illenium	"Good Things Fall Apart" with Jon Bellion	Ascend	
2019	DallasK	"I Know"	Non-album single	
2019	RAYE	"South East London"	Rapman Presents: Blue Story	
2020	Dua Lipa	"Physical"	Future Nostalgia	
2020	Dua Lipa	"Levitating" solo or feat. DaBaby	Future Nostalgia	
2020	Alma	"LA Money"	Have U Seen Her?	
2020	Alma	"Loser"	Have U Seen Her?	
2020	BUNT.	"Unbreakable" feat. Clarence Coffee Jr.	Non-album single	
2020	Now United	"Nobody Fools Me Twice"	Non-album single	
2020	Katy Perry	"What Makes a Woman"	Smile	
2020	Dua Lipa	"Love Is Religion"	Club Future Nostalgia	
2021	Dua Lipa	"If It Ain't Me"	Future Nostalgia: Moonlight Edition	
2021	Dua Lipa	"Not My Problem" feat. JID	Future Nostalgia: Moonlight Edition	
2021	Aleyna Tilki	"Retrograde"	Non-album single	
2021	Pop Smoke	"Demeanor" feat. Dua Lipa	Faith	
2021	LVCRFT	"Every Night" feat. JHart, Sarah Hudson and Jake Miller	The Return	
2021	Troye Sivan	"Angel Baby"	Non-album single	
2021	Young Bombs	"U Up?" feat. Stondon Massey	Non-album single	
2022	Megan Thee Stallion	"Sweetest Pie" with Dua Lipa	Traumazine	
2022	Cheat Codes	"Afraid of Love" with Stondon Massey	Hellraisers, Part 3	
2022	Classy	"Super Cool"	Class Is Over - EP	
2022	Noah Cyrus	"Mr. Percocet"	The Hardest Part	
2022	Key	"Bound"	Gasoline	
2022	5 Seconds of Summer	"Bad Omens"	5SOS5	
2022	Måneskin	"The Loneliest"	Rush!	
2022	Leah Kate	"Hot All the Time"	Alive and Unwell - EP	
2022	Illenium	"Worst Day" with MAX	Illenium	
2022	Leah Kate	"But I Lied"	Alive and Unwell: Deluxe Edition	
2023	Jessie Ware	"Pearls"	That! Feels Good!	
2023	Oliver Heldens	"10 Out of 10" with Kylie Minogue	Tension	
2023	Kim Petras	"Castle in The Sky"	Feed the Beast	
2023	Cher	"DJ Play a Christmas Song"	Christmas	
2023	Cher	"Angels in The Snow"	Christmas	
2023	Cher	"Drop Top Sleigh Ride" with Tyga	Christmas	
2023	Bludnymph	"Body Parts"	Drool - EP	
2023	The Struts	"Do What You Want"	Pretty Vicious	
2024	Audien	"21" with Jason Ross	Non-album single	
2024	RLY	"Safe & Sound"	Generation - EP	
2024	Pnau	"All the Time"	Hyperbolic	
2024	Channel Tres	"Cactus Water"	Head Rush	
2024	Adam Lambert	"Wet Dream"	Afters - EP	
2024	Mette	"Muscle"	Non-album single	
2024	Katy Perry	"Lifetimes"	143	
2024	Katy Perry	"Crush"	143	
2024	Katy Perry	"Nirvana"	143	
2024	Katy Perry	"Artificial" feat. JID	143	
2024	Katy Perry	"Truth"	143	
2024	Katy Perry	"I Woke Up"	1432	
2024	Damiano David	"Silverlines"	Funny Little Fears	
2024	Kylie Minogue	"Someone For Me" solo or with YouNotUs	Tension II	
2024	Damiano David	"Born with a Broken Heart"	Funny Little Fears	
2025	Alok	"Last Night I Dreamt I Fell in Love" with Kylie Minogue	Non-album single	
2025	Damiano David	"Next Summer"	Funny Little Fears	
2025	Damiano David	"Zombie Lady"	Funny Little Fears	
2025	Damiano David	"The Bruise" feat. Suki Waterhouse	Funny Little Fears	
2025	Damiano David	"Tango"	Funny Little Fears	
2025	Damiano David	"The First Time"	Funny Little Fears	
2025	Damiano David	"Solitude (No One Understands Me)"	Funny Little Fears	
2025	Damiano David	"Mysterious Girl"	Funny Little Fears	
2025	Kyra Machida	"DNA"	Blonde - EP	
2025	Demi Lovato	"Here All Night"	It's Not That Deep	
2025	5 Seconds of Summer	"Not OK"	Everyone's a Star!	
2025	PinkPantheress	"Stateside + Kylie Minogue" with Kylie Minogue	Fancy Some More?	
2025	Demi Lovato	"Frequency"	It's Not That Deep	
2025	5 Seconds of Summer	"No. 1 Obsession"	Everyone's a Star!	
2025	5 Seconds of Summer	"Evolve"	Everyone's a Star!	
2025	Kevin Jonas	"Changing"	Non-album single	
2025	Kylie Minogue	"Hot in December"	Kylie Christmas (Fully Wrapped)	
2025	Jade	"Church"	That's Showbiz Baby! The Encore	
2025	Cher	"Christmas is Here"	Non-album single	
2026	Demi Lovato	"Low Rise Jeans"	It's Not That Deep (Unless You Want It To Be)	
2026	Demi Lovato	"Love Controller"	It's Not That Deep (Unless You Want It To Be)	
2026	Demi Lovato	"After Hours"	It's Not That Deep (Unless You Want It To Be)	
2026	Kevin Jonas	"Little Things"	Non-album single	
2026	Bebe Rexha	"Tokyo"	Dirty Blonde	

== Filmography ==
- Frontline (2004)
- Project Runway (2005)
- Phineas and Ferb the Movie: Candace Against the Universe (2020) - voice of Ernox, singer of "Girls Day Out"
