= Next Summer (song) =

2025 single by Damiano David

Single by Damiano David

from the album Funny Little Fears
- Released: 28 February 2025
- Genre: Pop
- Length: 2:45
- Label: Sony Italy; Arista
- Songwriters: Damiano David; Jason Evigan; Mark Schick; Sarah Hudson
- Producers: Jason Evigan; Mark Schick

Damiano David singles chronology
"Born with a Broken Heart" (2024)	"Next Summer" (2025)	"Zombie Lady" (2025)

Music video
- "Next Summer" on YouTube

"Next Summer" is a song by the Italian singer Damiano David. It was released through Sony Music Italy and Arista Records on 28 February 2025, as the third single from David's debut studio album, Funny Little Fears (2025). He wrote the song alongside Sarah Hudson and its producers, Jason Evigan and Mark Schick. An acoustic ballad, it is about psychological trauma and personal struggles. A music video for "Next Summer" premiered hours after the single's release; it was filmed in an Italian prison and depicts David as an inmate. He performed the song on Jimmy Kimmel Live! on 19 March 2025.

== Background and release ==
In 2024, Damiano David started his solo musical career with the release of "Silverlines" and "Born with a Broken Heart", as well as a cover version of "Nothing Breaks Like a Heart" (2018) for Valentine's Day 2025, originally performed by Mark Ronson and Miley Cyrus. The singer reported that he would be embarking on his first solo concert tour in 2025. At an intimate concert in New York, he previewed a few songs from his debut album, with the titles of "Next Summer", "Voices", and "The Bruise". David announced his third single, "Next Summer", on 19 February 2025. It was released on 28 February to digital platforms and Italian radio airplay, while a music video premiered hours after on his YouTube channel. The video was filmed in an Italian prison and stars David as an inmate.

== Composition ==
"Next Summer" was written by David, Sarah Hudson, Jason Evigan, and Mark Schick, while the production was handled by the latter two. With a duration of two minutes and forty-five seconds, it is a pop acoustic ballad. It was written while David was in Los Angeles in mid-2024. The lyrical content of "Next Summer" centers on psychological trauma and personal struggles. While releasing the single, David stated that it is "an allegory of life": "How sometimes we can be prisoners of ourselves, our fears, our insecurities, our inability to change."

== Live performances ==
David performed "Next Summer" on Jimmy Kimmel Live! on 19 March 2025.

== Charts ==
=== Weekly charts ===
Weekly chart performance for "Next Summer"
Chart (2025)	Peak position
Belarus Airplay (TopHit)	1
Belgium (Ultratop 50 Flanders)	6
Belgium (Ultratop 50 Wallonia)	8
CIS Airplay (TopHit)	8
Croatia International Airplay (Top lista)	20
Czech Republic Airplay (ČNS IFPI)	2
Estonia Airplay (TopHit)	23
Finland Airplay (Radiosoittolista)	7
France (SNEP)	52
Germany Airplay (BVMI)	72
Greece International (IFPI)	46
Greece Airplay (IFPI)	14
Italy (FIMI)	50
Japan Hot Overseas (Billboard Japan)	14
Kazakhstan Airplay (TopHit)	4
Lithuania Airplay (TopHit)	33
Moldova Airplay (TopHit)	4
North Macedonia Airplay (Radiomonitor)	2
Poland Airplay (OLiS)	1
Poland Streaming (OLiS)	86
Portugal (AFP)	154
Romania Airplay (UPFR)	9
Romania Airplay (Media Forest)	4
Russia Airplay (TopHit)	7
San Marino Airplay (SMRTV Top 50)	12
Slovakia Airplay (ČNS IFPI)	26
Spain Airplay (Promusicae)	16
Switzerland (Schweizer Hitparade)	60
Switzerland Airplay (IFPI Schweiz)	2
Ukraine Airplay (TopHit)	3
UK Singles Downloads (Official Charts)	95

=== Monthly charts ===
Monthly chart performance for "Next Summer"
Chart (2025)	Peak position
Belarus Airplay (TopHit)	2
CIS Airplay (TopHit)	10
Estonia Airplay (TopHit)	32
Kazakhstan Airplay (TopHit)	7
Lithuania Airplay (TopHit)	61
Moldova Airplay (TopHit)	5
Romania Airplay (TopHit)	12
Russia Airplay (TopHit)	12
Ukraine Airplay (TopHit)	7

=== Year-end charts ===
Year-end chart performance for "Next Summer"
Chart (2025)	Position
Belarus Airplay (TopHit)	19
Belgium (Ultratop 50 Flanders)	36
Belgium (Ultratop 50 Wallonia)	37
CIS Airplay (TopHit)	13
Estonia Airplay (TopHit)	114
France (SNEP)	117
Kazakhstan Airplay (TopHit)	9
Lithuania Airplay (TopHit)	98
Moldova Airplay (TopHit)	26
Poland (Polish Airplay Top 100)	20
Romania Airplay (TopHit)	23
Russia Airplay (TopHit)	14

== Certifications ==
Certifications for "Next Summer"
Region	Certification	Certified units/sales
Belgium (BRMA)	Gold	20,000^{‡}
France (SNEP)	Platinum	200,000^{‡}
Switzerland (IFPI Switzerland)	Gold	15,000^{‡}
^{‡} Sales+streaming figures based on certification alone.

== Release history ==
Release dates and formats for "Next Summer"
Region	Date	Format	Label	Ref.
Various	28 February 2025	Digital download; streaming	Sony Italy; Arista	
Italy	28 February 2025	Radio airplay	Sony Italy	
