= I'll Have Another... Christmas Album =

Studio album by Straight No Chaser
- Released: October 28, 2016
- Genre: Christmas, Acappella
- Length: 45:56
- Label: Atlantic
- Producer: Ryan Ahlwardt

Straight No Chaser chronology
The New Old Fashioned (2015)	I'll Have Another... Christmas Album (2016)	One Shot (2018)

I'll Have Another... Christmas Album is the sixth studio album by American men's singing group Straight No Chaser. It was released in the United States on October 28, 2016, and peaked at number 53 on the US Billboard 200.

== Track listing ==
No.	Title	Length
1.	"All I Want For Christmas Is You"	3:41
2.	"Mary, Did You Know?"	3:30
3.	"Feels Like Christmas" (feat. Jana Kramer)	2:59
4.	"Do You Hear What I Hear?"	3:59
5.	"Joy To The World"	3:08
6.	"Have Yourself A Merry Little Christmas"	3:20
7.	"Run Run Rudolf"	2:08
8.	"The Greatest Gift Of All"	3:42
9.	"Up On The Housetop"	2:48
10.	"Sing We Now of Christmas"	2:05
11.	"Mele Kalikimaka"	2:44
12.	"Christmas Lights"	3:24
13.	"Lully Lullay (Coventry Carol)"	2:51
14.	"Winter Wonderland"	2:23
15.	"To Christmas! (The Drinking Song)"	3:14

Target exclusive edition bonus tracks
No.	Title	Length
16.	"What Christmas Means To Me"	3:00
17.	"Go Tell It On The Mountain"	2:40

== Charts ==
Chart (2016)	Peak position
U.S. Billboard 200	53

== Release history ==
Region	Release date	Label
United States	October 28, 2016	Atlantic Records
