= Holiday Spirits =

Studio album by Straight No Chaser
- Released: October 28, 2008 (US)
- Recorded: 2008
- Genre: A cappella; Christmas
- Length: 43:15
- Label: Atlantic

Straight No Chaser chronology
Holiday Spirits (2008)	Christmas Cheers (2009)

Holiday Spirits is the debut studio album by the American men's a cappella singing group Straight No Chaser. It was released in the US on October 28, 2008, by Atlantic Records. It peaked at No. 46 on the U.S. Billboard 200.

== Track listing ==
No.	Title	Length
1.	"Santa Claus Is Coming To Town"	2:37
2.	"Jingle Bell Rock"	2:06
3.	"The Christmas Song"	3:14
4.	"This Christmas"	3:01
5.	"Christmas Wish"	3:46
6.	"Hark! The Herald Angels Sing/Angels We Have Heard On High"	4:19
7.	"Little Saint Nick"	2:14
8.	"The 12 Days Of Christmas" (Live)	3:43
9.	"Indiana Christmas"	3:25
10.	"Sweet Little Jesus Boy"	3:16
11.	"Christmas (Baby Please Come Home)"	3:12
12.	"Carol Of The Bells"	2:13
13.	"Silent Night"	3:34
14.	"Auld Lang Syne"	2:35

== Chart performance ==
Chart (2009)	Peak position
U.S. Billboard 200	46

== Certifications ==
Region	Certification	Certified units/sales
United States (RIAA)	Gold	500,000^{‡}
^{‡} Sales+streaming figures based on certification alone.

== Release history ==
Region	Release date	Label
United States	October 28, 2008	Atlantic Records
United Kingdom	October 27, 2008	Atlantic Records
