= Under the Influence (Straight No Chaser album) =

Studio album by Straight No Chaser
- Released: May 7, 2013
- Genre: Pop rock
- Length: 36:38
- Label: Atco Records, Atlantic Records
- Producer: Mark Kibble, Steve Lunt

Straight No Chaser chronology
With a Twist (2010)	Under the Influence (2013)	The New Old Fashioned (2015)

Under the Influence is the fourth studio album by American men's singing group Straight No Chaser. It was released in the US on May 7, 2013, and peaked at number 28 on the U.S. Billboard 200. In 2014, the album was reissued as a version called the Under the Influence (Ultimate Edition), which included the all tracks from the original album and the Holiday Edition EP.

== Holiday edition ==
Later the same year, Straight No Chaser released a follow-up holiday EP titled Under the Influence: Holiday Edition on October 29, 2013, teaming up with several featured artists, such as Paul McCartney, Colbie Caillat, CeeLo Green, and Otis Redding. This EP reached number 33 on the Billboard 200, and number 4 on the Billboard Top Holiday Albums chart.

For the 2014 holiday season, the group recorded a new comedic holiday duet titled "Text Me Merry Christmas" with Kristen Bell, and reissued the EP to include the track.

== Track listing ==
No.	Title	Length
1.	"I Want You Back" (feat. Sara Bareilles)	3:02
2.	"Rolling in the Deep"	3:26
3.	"Against All Odds (Take a Look at Me Now)" (feat. Phil Collins)	3:20
4.	"Signed, Sealed, Delivered (I'm Yours)" (feat. Stevie Wonder)	2:50
5.	"Don't Let the Sun Go Down on Me" (feat. Elton John)	2:35
6.	"Some Nights/We Are Young"	3:39
7.	"I Won't Give Up" (feat. Jason Mraz)	4:02
8.	"This Is How a Heart Breaks" (feat. Rob Thomas)	3:19
9.	"Kiss from a Rose" (feat. Seal)	4:10
10.	"Jolene" (feat. Dolly Parton)	2:45
11.	"Hallelujah"	3:30
12.	"Somebody That I Used To Know" (Deluxe Edition)	3:16
13.	"Soldier" (Deluxe Edition)	3:33
14.	"Lego House" (Deluxe Edition)	2:59
15.	"Use Me/Ain't No Sunshine" (Deluxe Edition)	3:36
16.	"Everyday" (Deluxe Edition)	2:25
17.	"What I'd Say/Hit the Road Jack/Mas Que Nada" (Deluxe Edition)	3:00

Holiday Edition
No.	Title	Length
1.	"Text Me Merry Christmas" (feat. Kristen Bell) (Reissue, Ultimate Edition)	2:40
2.	"Every Day Is Christmas" (feat. Colbie Caillat)	4:36
3.	"White Christmas" (feat. CeeLo Green)	3:09
4.	"Merry Christmas Baby" (feat. Otis Redding)	2:44
5.	"Wonderful Christmastime" (feat. Paul McCartney)	3:30
6.	"Home by Christmas Day"	2:44
7.	"Nutcracker"	3:07
8.	"Song for Santa"	3:30
9.	"Amazing Grace"	3:47

== Chart performance ==
Release	Chart (2013)	Peak position
Original	U.S. Billboard 200	28
Holiday EP	U.S. Billboard 200	33
Holiday EP	U.S. Billboard Top Holiday Albums	4

== Release history ==
Release	Region	Release date	Label
Initial Release	United States	May 7, 2013	Atlantic Records
Holiday Edition	United States	October 29, 2013	Atlantic Records
Holiday Edition Reissue	United States	November 18, 2014	Atlantic Records
Ultimate Edition	United States	November 18, 2014	Atlantic Records

== Reception ==
The Washington Post called the original album a fun listen, although there was nothing cutting edge to the album.
