= Funny Little Fears =

- Standard edition cover

Studio album by Damiano David
- Released: 16 May 2025
- Genres: Pop; pop rock
- Length: 48:42
- Labels: Sony Italy; Arista
- Producers: Connor McDonough; Labrinth; Jackson Rau; Jason Evigan; John Hill; Mark Schick; Riley McDonough; Ryan Daly; Sammy Witte

Singles from Funny Little Fears
- 1. "Silverlines" Released: 27 September 2024; 2. "Born with a Broken Heart" Released: 25 October 2024; 3. "Next Summer" Released: 28 February 2025; 4. "Zombie Lady" Released: 16 May 2025; 5. "The First Time" Released: 4 June 2025

Singles from Funny Little Fears (Dreams)
- 1. "Talk to Me" Released: 11 September 2025

Funny Little Fears (stylized as FUNNY little FEARS) is the debut studio album by the Italian singer and songwriter Damiano David. It was released through Sony Music Italy and Arista Records on 16 May 2025, as his first work besides his career as the lead vocalist of the rock band Måneskin. Featuring a pop and pop rock sound, Funny Little Fears centers its lyrical themes on self-insecurities. The singers Suki Waterhouse and D4vd appear as featured artists, each on one track.

The album was supported by five singles; "Silverlines", "Born with a Broken Heart", "Next Summer", "Zombie Lady", and "The First Time" reached the top ten in Belgium and received certifications internationally. Upon its release, Funny Little Fears received mixed reviews from music critics regarding its production and David's departure from rock music. Commercially, the album peaked at number one in Belgium while reaching the main record charts in other 20 countries, and was certified gold in France, Italy and Poland.

A deluxe edition of the album, titled Funny Little Fears (Dreams), was released on 11 September 2025. It includes five new tracks, featuring the single "Talk to Me" with Tyla and Nile Rodgers, as well as a collaboration with Albert Hammond Jr. To promote the album, David embarked on his first solo concert tour, which began on 11 September 2025 and concluded on 16 December 2025.

== Background and composition ==
In 2024, Damiano David stated that he had written over seventy songs in Hollywood, Los Angeles following the end of a romantic relationship in 2023. The album consists of fourteen tracks written and composed by David himself with numerous songwriters, including Ferras, Labrinth and Noah Cyrus. In an interview with Rockol, the artist said about the production and writing of the album:

"Fears have always been a tremendous block in my life, something I have been so ashamed of that I have isolated myself. This album gave me the opportunity to make these fears a beautiful thing, an additional opportunity to make music and connect with people. [...] Here the need came from a strong feeling of feeling wrong, of not being able to read and correct myself. Music is about throwing thoughts on a paper, then when I reread, it's like I'm a third person and I have a clearer view of everything. The album was a way for me to understand the reason and the fears when I put myself in my brain. It was therapeutic. [...] All the production comes from collaborations. It's part of the art to recognise when a piece speaks to you, when you have the feeling that someone is telling your story. For me, music is a game and collaborating with others is an added value."

== Release and promotion ==
"Silverlines" was released on 27 September 2024 as the lead single from the album and David's debut solo song. Produced by Labrinth, it was released alongside a music video directed by Nono + Rodrigo. The album's second single, "Born with a Broken Heart", premiered on 25 October 2024 with an accompanying Aerin Moreno-directed video. "Next Summer", the third single, was released on 28 February 2025; its accompanying music video sees David portraying an inmate in an Italian prison.

David announced Funny Little Fears on social media on 11 March 2025. He also shared its cover artwork and track listing. The album is set to be released on 16 May 2025 by Sony Music Italy and Arista Records. It will be issued digitally as well as to CD and vinyl LP formats. In promotion of Funny Little Fears, David will embark on his first solo concert tour. Consisting of 34 dates, it will pass through Asia, Australia, Europe, North America, and South America. It began on 11 September 2025 in Warsaw, Poland, and concluded on 16 December 2025 in Silver Spring, Maryland, United States. On the same date as the start of the tour, David released a deluxe edition of the album, titled Funny Little Fears (Dreams). It added five new tracks and was supported by the single "Talk to Me", in collaboration with the South African singer Tyla and the American musician Nile Rodgers.

In April 2026, following the arrest of D4vd who was charged with the killing of Celeste Rivas Hernandez, David removed D4vd's verse from "Tangerine".

== Reception ==
Professional ratings
Review scores
Source	Rating
DIY	3/5 stars
Kerrang!	3/5 stars
NME	4/5 stars
Rockol	7/10
The Irish Times	4/5 stars

The album received generally positive reviews from international music critics, which praised its production and lyric writing.

Kerrang! remarked, "Nothing wrong with that and nothing wrong with FUNNY little FEARS, but its success will depend on whether existing fans are as free-thinking as this talented artist clearly is," rating the album three out of five. In a positive review, Ed Power of The Irish Times stated that although "the world was not crying out for a solo project", the album is "a beautifully overwrought collection that is full of twinkling Eurobeats" in which "David isn’t doing Måneskin 2.0. Instead he's hell-bent on bringing the listener to pop heaven".

Italian music critics gave mixed reviews to the album, with some supporting David's direction into pop, and others criticising the production and songwriting; some regarded him as an "Italian Harry Styles".

== Track listing ==
Funny Little Fears track listing
No.	Title	Writer(s)	Producer(s)	Length
1.	"Voices"	Damiano David; Cleo Tighe; Castle; Sammy Witte; John Hill	Hill; Witte	3:33
2.	"Next Summer"	David; Sarah Hudson; Mark Schick; Jason Evigan	J. Evigan^{[p]}; Schick^{[p]}	2:45
3.	"Zombie Lady"	David; Hudson; Schick; J. Evigan; Tighe	J. Evigan^{[p]}; Schick^{[p]}	3:09
4.	"The Bruise" (featuring Suki Waterhouse)	J. Evigan; Victoria Evigan; Noah Cyrus; Hudson	J. Evigan^{[p]}; Schick^{[v]}	3:35
5.	"Sick of Myself"	David; Jackson Rau	Rau^{[p]}; Schick^{[v]}	3:37
6.	"Angel"	David; Riley McDonough; Connor McDonough; Ryan Daly; Ryan Wheeler	Daly; C. McDonough; Daly; R. McDonough	2:42
7.	"Tango"	David; Hudson; Schick; J. Evigan	J. Evigan^{[p]}; Schick^{[v]}	3:12
8.	"Born with a Broken Heart"	David; Hudson; Schick; J. Evigan	J. Evigan^{[p]}; Schick^{[v]}	3:28
9.	"Tangerine" (featuring D4vd (Note: Replaced with a solo version on album reissues.))	David; Amy Allen; John Ryan; Witte; Hill; David Anthony Burke	Hill; Witte	3:22
10.	"Mars"	David; Schick; J. Evigan; Pablo Bowman	J. Evigan^{[p]}; Schick^{[v]}	5:01
11.	"The First Time"	David; Hudson; Schick; J. Evigan; Rau; C. McDonough; R. McDonough	C. McDonough; R. McDonough; J. Evigan^{[p]}; Schick^{[p]}; Rau	3:39
12.	"Perfect Life"	David; Rau	Rau^{[p]}; Schick^{[v]}	3:31
13.	"Silverlines"	David; Ferras Alqaisi; Labrinth; Hudson	Labrinth	3:17
14.	"Solitude (No One Understands Me)"	David; Hudson; Schick; J. Evigan; Rau; C. McDonough; R. McDonough	J. Evigan^{[p]}; Schick^{[p]}; Rau; C. McDonough; R. McDonough	4:04
Total length:				48:42

Funny Little Fears Japanese CD edition additional track listing
No.	Title	Length
15.	"Voices" (live in New York)

Funny Little Fears (Dreams) deluxe edition additional track listing
No.	Title	Writer(s)	Producer(s)	Length
1.	"Talk to Me" (featuring Tyla and Nile Rodgers)	David; Hill; Sarah Aarons; Witte	Hill; Witte	3:13
2.	"Cinnamon" (featuring Albert Hammond Jr.)	David; Hammond; C. McDonough; R. McDonough; Daly; Evigan; Toby McDonough; Wheeler	C. McDonough; R. McDonough; Daly; Evigan	2:24
3.	"Naked"	David; R. McDonough; C. McDonough; Daly; T. McDonough; Evigan; Wheeler	R. McDonough; C. McDonough; Daly; Evigan	2:37
4.	"Mysterious Girl"	David; Hudson; Schick; Evigan	Schick; Evigan	3:21
5.	"Over"	Evigan; Evan Blair; Romans	Blair	2:41

Funny Little Fears (Dreams) Spotify edition track listing
No.	Title	Length
20.	"Nothing Breaks Like a Heart" (Spotify Singles; Mark Ronson and Miley Cyrus cover)	3:38

Japanese Deluxe Extended edition includes song Voices as track 21 Live version Notes

- ^{^[p]} signifies a primary and vocal producer.
- ^{^[v]} signifies a vocal producer.
- D4vd's feature on "Tangerine" was removed and replaced with a solo version at an undocumented date due to his involvement and arrest in the killing of Celeste Rivas Hernandez.
- "Silverlines" is not included on vinyl pressings of the album.

== Personnel ==
Credits adapted from the album's liner notes.

=== Musicians ===
- Damiano David – lead vocals (all tracks), backing vocals (tracks 1, 2, 5, 8, 9, 11, 12, 14)
- Tommy King – piano (tracks 1, 2, 7, 8, 10, 11); drums, keyboards (1)
- Rob Moose – strings (tracks 1, 2, 8, 10)
- John Hill – drums, programming, keyboards, acoustic guitar (tracks 1, 9); drum programming (9)
- Sammy Witte – programming, keyboards (tracks 1, 9); piano (1)
- Cleo Tighe – backing vocals (track 1)
- Daniel Aged – bass (track 1)
- Evan Jackson – horns (track 1)
- Jason Evigan – keyboards, electric guitars, programming (tracks 2–4, 7, 8, 10, 11, 14); acoustic guitars (2–4, 7, 8, 10, 11), backing vocals (2, 4, 8, 11, 14), drums (4, 14)
- Mark Schick – keyboards, electric guitars, programming (tracks 2, 3, 7, 8, 10, 11, 14); acoustic guitars (2, 3, 7, 8, 10, 11), backing vocals (2, 8, 11, 14), bass (14), piano (14)
- Joey Waronker – drums (tracks 2, 7, 8, 10, 11)
- Justin Meldal-Johnsen – bass (tracks 2, 7, 8, 10, 11)
- Michael Romero – brass horns (tracks 2, 8, 10)
- Sarah Hudson – backing vocals (tracks 2, 8, 11, 14)
- Dove Cameron – backing vocals (track 3)
- Mike Elizondo – bass (track 4)
- Alna Hofmeyr – backing vocals (4)
- Jackson Rau – backing vocals (tracks 5, 11, 12); drums, programming, guitars, keyboards (5, 12); piano (5, 14) bass (12)
- Connor McDonough – keyboards (tracks 6, 14); drums, piano, guitars, additional vocals (6); programming, backing vocals (11, 14)
- Riley McDonough – guitars, additional vocals (track 6); backing vocals (11, 14), acoustic guitars (14)
- Ryan Daly – drums, piano, keyboards, guitars, additional vocals (track 6)
- Ryan Winkler – bass (track 6)
- Anders Mouridsen – bass, electric guitar, slide guitar, pedal steel (track 9)
- Grace Kelly – saxophone (track 11)

=== Technical ===
- Serban Ghenea – mixing (tracks 1, 2, 8)
- Mitch McCarthy – mixing (tracks 3, 7, 9, 11)
- Tom Elmhirst – mixing (tracks 4, 10)
- Nathan Dantzler – mastering (tracks 2–5, 7, 8, 10, 11, 14)
- Jon Yeston – engineering (tracks 1, 9)
- Sammy Witte – engineering (tracks 1, 9)
- Jackson Rau – engineering (tracks 2, 3, 7, 8, 10–12, 14)
- Jeremy Hatcher – engineering (tracks 2, 3, 7, 8, 10, 11)
- Mark Schick – engineering (tracks 2–5, 7, 8, 10–12, 14)
- Jason Evigan – engineering (tracks 2–5, 7, 8, 10, 11, 14)
- Connor McDonough – engineering (tracks 6, 11, 14)
- Ryan Daly – engineering (track 6)
- Riley McDonough – engineering (track 6)
- Walker Steele – engineering assistance (track 9)

=== Visuals ===
- Damiano David – creative direction
- Fabrizio Ferraguzzo – creative direction
- Alessandro Fabrizio – creative direction
- Damon Baker – photography
- Davide Rossi Doria – cover design, back design
- Michele Potenza – styling
- Marco Steri – hairstyling

== Charts ==
=== Weekly charts ===
Weekly chart performance for Funny Little Fears
Chart (2025)	Peak position
Australian Albums (ARIA)	95
Austrian Albums (Ö3 Austria)	3
Belgian Albums (Ultratop Flanders)	1
Belgian Albums (Ultratop Wallonia)	1
Croatian International Albums (HDU)	10
Dutch Albums (Album Top 100)	5
Finnish Albums (Suomen virallinen lista)	29
French Albums (SNEP)	2
German Albums (Offizielle Top 100)	5
Greek Albums (IFPI)	46
Hungarian Albums (MAHASZ)	5
Italian Albums (FIMI)	4
Japanese Albums (Oricon)	27
Japanese Digital Albums (Oricon)	30
Japanese Rock Albums (Oricon)	4
Japanese Download Albums (Billboard Japan)	29
Japanese Top Albums Sales (Billboard Japan)	28
Lithuanian Albums (AGATA)	16
Norwegian Albums (VG-lista)	34
Polish Albums (ZPAV)	3
Portuguese Albums (AFP)	3
Scottish Albums (Official Charts)	13
Spanish Albums (PROMUSICAE)	4
Swedish Albums (Sverigetopplistan)	48
Swiss Albums (Schweizer Hitparade)	2
UK Albums (Official Charts)	68
US Top Album Sales (Billboard)	22

Weekly chart performance for Funny Little Fears (Dreams)
Chart (2025)	Peak position
Portuguese Albums (AFP)	148

=== Monthly charts ===
Monthly chart performance for Funny Little Fears
Chart (2025)	Peak position
Japanese Rock Albums (Oricon)	18

=== Year-end charts ===
Year-end chart performance for Funny Little Fears
Chart (2025)	Position
Belgian Albums (Ultratop Flanders)	75
Belgian Albums (Ultratop Wallonia)	22
French Albums (SNEP)	37
Polish Albums (ZPAV)	67
Swiss Albums (Schweizer Hitparade)	68

== Certifications ==
Certifications for Funny Little Fears
Region	Certification	Certified units/sales
Belgium (BRMA)	Gold	10,000^{‡}
France (SNEP)	Platinum	100,000^{‡}
Italy (FIMI)	Platinum	50,000^{‡}
Poland (ZPAV)	Gold	15,000^{‡}
Portugal (AFP)	Gold	3,500^{‡}
Spain (Promusicae)	Gold	20,000^{‡}
^{‡} Sales+streaming figures based on certification alone.

== Release history ==
Release history and formats for Funny Little Fears
Region	Date	Format(s)	Label(s)	Ref.
Various	16 May 2025	CD; LP	Sony Italy; Arista	
Various	16 May 2025	Digital download; streaming	Sony Italy; Arista	
