= Little Things (Kevin Jonas song) =

2026 single by Kevin Jonas

Single by Kevin Jonas
- Released: May 15, 2026
- Genre: Pop
- Length: 2:56
- Label: PKJ Records; Hollywood Records
- Songwriters: Ferras Alqaisi; James Abrahart; Sarah Hudson; Jason Evigan; Mark Schick
- Producers: Jason Evigan; Mark Schick

Kevin Jonas singles chronology
"Changing" (2025)	"Little Things" (2026)

"Little Things" is a song by American singer and musician Kevin Jonas. It was released by PKJ Records on May 15, 2026. The song is Jonas' second official release as a solo artist, after the release of his debut solo single, "Changing", in November 2025.

== Background and release ==
On May 4, 2026, Jonas announced the single and its release date, and debuted the song live two days before its release, on May 13, 2026, in São Paulo, Brazil, during the South America run of the Jonas20: Greetings from Your Hometown Tour.

"Little Things" is a song dedicated to Jonas' wife Danielle, and their marriage of nearly two decades. In a statement on the song's release day, May 15, 2026, Jonas says, "Whereas 'Changing' felt like a new beginning, 'Little Things' is less of an introduction to me and more a continuation of who I am. My wife and I have been married for 17 years. There are little moments during our time together that trigger my joy and happiness and remind me exactly why I’m still with her."

== Critical reception ==
Buddy Iahn of The Music Universe says, "The track is so intimate that you can hear the fretboard squeak between chord changes on his acoustic guitar. Backed by a breezy keyboard loop, he discloses all of his favorite idiosyncrasies (and a few secrets) at the heart of a nearly two-decade marriage to his wife Danielle." Iahn also concludes, "The song sounds like a peek through your favorite couple's iPhone camera roll."

Zangba Thomson of Bong Mines Entertainment summarizes that the song "is an acoustic-driven pop release built around intimate songwriting, warm guitar textures, and reflections on long-term love. The single continues Kevin Jonas' emerging solo era while positioning him within the growing wave of emotionally grounded adult pop storytelling."
