= A Legendary Christmas =

Studio album by John Legend
- Released: October 26, 2018
- Genre: Christmas
- Length: 49:44
- Label: Columbia
- Producer: John Roger Stephens

John Legend chronology
Darkness and Light (2016)	A Legendary Christmas (2018)	Bigger Love (2020)

Singles from A Legendary Christmas
- 1. "Bring Me Love" Released: October 11, 2018; 2. "Have Yourself a Merry Little Christmas" Released: October 11, 2018

A Legendary Christmas is the first Christmas album and seventh studio album by American singer John Legend, it was released on October 26, 2018. Featuring artists such as Esperanza Spalding and Stevie Wonder, the album was promoted by a tour of the same name from November to December 2018. It received a nomination for Best Traditional Pop Vocal Album at the 2020 Grammy Awards.

== Background ==
The album is Legend's first holiday album, which he announced on October 1, 2018, via social media. His tweet wrote "This winter, get ready for A Legendary Christmas! I have a brand new Christmas album coming out accompanied by #ALegendaryChristmas Tour!". Prior to the album's announcement, Legend had just become the first African-American male to win an EGOT – an Emmy, a Grammy, an Oscar and a Tony. Legend has previously said of his intention to create a Christmas album, he said "I just made a new Christmas album. I've wanted to do this for a long time." On October 11, 2018, Legend premiered two lead singles from the album, "Bring Me Love" and "Have Yourself a Merry Little Christmas" simultaneously on VEVO. The album was re-released on November 8, 2019 with four additional tracks.

== Composition ==
Wonder features on the first song, "What Christmas Means to Me", in which he plays the harmonica, while Spalding sings on "Have Yourself a Merry Little Christmas". Featuring fourteen songs, the album is composed of eight that are "Christmas classics" and six that are original tracks by Legend. The album is executive-produced by neo-soul singer/producer Raphael Saadiq. All string arrangements by Matt Jones, including "Happy Xmas (War Is Over)" on the Super Deluxe Edition which featured an improvised solo by violinist Scott Tixier.

== Reception ==
Entertainment Weekly ranked the album 10th on its list of the "Best Christmas Albums of all Time", writing that Legend "bring his rich R&B roots to a holiday record" and prising the album features with Clarkson, Spalding, and Wonder. In 2022 Billboard listed This Christmas Day as the 4th "Best Christmas Albums of the 21st Century".

== Commercial performance ==
In John Legend's home country of the United States, A Legendary Christmas debuted at number 26 on the Billboard 200 with 20,000 album-equivalent units, which included 19,000 pure album sales. Eventually, the album rose to 22

== Track listing ==
All tracks produced by Raphael Saadiq.

A Legendary Christmas
No.	Title	Writer(s)	Length
1.	"What Christmas Means to Me" (featuring Stevie Wonder)	Anna Gordy Gaye; George Gordy; Allen Story	2:41
2.	"Silver Bells"	Jay Livingston; Ray Evans	3:16
3.	"Have Yourself a Merry Little Christmas" (featuring Esperanza Spalding)	Hugh Martin; Ralph Blane	3:43
4.	"No Place Like Home"	John Stephens; Ruth-Anne Cunningham	3:57
5.	"Bring Me Love"	Stephens; Walter E. Rollins; Steve Nelson; Meghan Trainor	3:19
6.	"Merry Christmas Baby/Give Love on Christmas Day"	Lou Baxter; Johnny Moore; Deke Richards; Alphonzo Mizell; Frederick Perren; Christine Perren	3:50
7.	"Christmas Time Is Here"	Lee Mendelson; Vince Guaraldi	3:20
8.	"Waiting for Christmas"	Stephens; Daniel Wilson; Raphael Saadiq	2:35
9.	"Purple Snowflakes"	Clarence Pauling; David Hamilton	2:49
10.	"The Christmas Song (Chestnuts Roasting on an Open Fire)"	Robert Wells; Mel Tormé	4:15
11.	"Please Come Home for Christmas"	Charles Brown; Gene Redd	4:08
12.	"Wrap Me Up in Your Love"	Stephens; Wayne Hector; Saadiq	3:45
13.	"By Christmas Eve"	Stephens; Amy Wadge; Daniel Lafrombe	3:51
14.	"Merry Merry Christmas"	Stephens; Earl Johnson IV; Saadiq	4:15
Total length:			49:44

Japanese bonus tracks
No.	Title	Length
15.	"O Come, All Ye Faithful"	4:24
16.	"No Place Like Home" (acoustic demo)	3:54
Total length:		58:09

A Legendary Christmas – Deluxe Edition
No.	Title	Writer(s)	Length
1.	"What Christmas Means to Me" (featuring Stevie Wonder on Harmonica)	Anna Gordy Gaye; George Gordy; Allen Story	2:41
2.	"Bring Me Love"	John Stephens; Walter E. Rollins; Steve Nelson; Meghan Trainor	3:19
3.	"This Christmas"	Donny Hathaway; Nadine McKinnor	3:03
4.	"My Favorite Things"	Rodgers and Hammerstein	2:54
5.	"Baby, It's Cold Outside" (featuring Kelly Clarkson)	Frank Loesser	3:38
6.	"Christmas in New Orleans"	Joe Van Winkle; Richard M. Sherman	3:48
7.	"Silver Bells"	Jay Livingston; Ray Evans	3:16
8.	"Have Yourself a Merry Little Christmas" (featuring Esperanza Spalding)	Hugh Martin; Ralph Blane	3:43
9.	"No Place Like Home"	Stephens; Ruth-Anne Cunningham	3:57
10.	"Merry Christmas Baby/Give Love on Christmas Day"	Lou Baxter; Johnny Moore; Deke Richards; Alphonzo Mizell; Frederick Perren; Christine Perren	3:50
11.	"Christmas Time Is Here"	Lee Mendelson; Vince Guaraldi	3:20
12.	"By Christmas Eve"	Stephens; Amy Wadge; Daniel Lafrombe	3:51
13.	"Purple Snowflakes"	Clarence Pauling; David Hamilton	2:49
14.	"The Christmas Song (Chestnuts Roasting on an Open Fire)"	Robert Wells; Mel Tormé	4:15
15.	"Please Come Home for Christmas"	Charles Brown; Gene Redd	4:08
16.	"Wrap Me Up in Your Love"	Stephens; Wayne Hector; Saadiq	3:45
17.	"Waiting for Christmas"	Stephens; Daniel Wilson; Raphael Saadiq	2:35
18.	"Merry Merry Christmas"	Stephens; Earl Johnson IV; Saadiq	4:15
Total length:			63:12

iTunes Deluxe Edition bonus track
No.	Title	Writer(s)	Length
9.	"Happy Xmas (War Is Over)"	John Lennon; Yoko Ono	3:30

A Legendary Christmas – Super Deluxe Edition
No.	Title	Writer(s)	Length
1.	"What Christmas Means to Me" (featuring Stevie Wonder)	Anna Gordy Gaye; George Gordy; Allen Story	2:41
2.	"Bring Me Love"	John Stephens; Walter E. Rollins; Steve Nelson; Meghan Trainor	3:19
3.	"This Christmas"	Donny Hathaway; Nadine McKinnor	3:03
4.	"My Favorite Things"	Rodgers and Hammerstein	2:54
5.	"Baby, It's Cold Outside" (featuring Kelly Clarkson)	Frank Loesser	3:38
6.	"Christmas in New Orleans"	Joe Van Winkle; Richard M. Sherman	3:48
7.	"Silver Bells"	Jay Livingston; Ray Evans	3:16
8.	"Have Yourself a Merry Little Christmas" (featuring Esperanza Spalding)	Hugh Martin; Ralph Blane	3:43
9.	"Happy Xmas (War Is Over)"	John Lennon; Yoko Ono	3:30
10.	"No Place Like Home"	Stephens; Ruth-Anne Cunningham	3:57
11.	"Merry Christmas Baby/Give Love on Christmas Day"	Lou Baxter; Johnny Moore; Deke Richards; Alphonzo Mizell; Frederick Perren; Christine Perren	3:50
12.	"Christmas Time Is Here"	Lee Mendelson; Vince Guaraldi	3:20
13.	"By Christmas Eve"	Stephens; Amy Wadge; Daniel Lafrombe	3:51
14.	"Purple Snowflakes"	Clarence Pauling; David Hamilton	2:49
15.	"The Christmas Song (Chestnuts Roasting on an Open Fire)"	Robert Wells; Mel Tormé	4:15
16.	"Please Come Home for Christmas"	Charles Brown; Gene Redd	4:08
17.	"Wrap Me Up in Your Love"	Stephens; Wayne Hector; Saadiq	3:45
18.	"Waiting for Christmas"	Stephens; Daniel Wilson; Raphael Saadiq	2:35
19.	"Merry Merry Christmas"	Stephens; Earl Johnson IV; Saadiq	4:15
20.	"O Come, All Ye Faithful"	Traditional	4:24
21.	"No Place Like Home (Acoustic Demo)"	Stephens; Cunningham	3:53
22.	"Give Love on Christmas Day (Piano Version) [Recorded Live at Spotify Studios NYC]"	Berry Gordy Jr.; Fonce Mizell; Freddie Perren; Deke Richards; Christine Perren	3:45
23.	"Let It Snow"	Jule Styne	2:00
24.	"O Holy Night"	Traditional	3:21
25.	"Jesus, What a Wonderful Child"	Traditional	2:49
26.	"Winter Wonderland"	Felix Bernard	1:52
27.	"It Don't Have to Change" (featuring The Stephens Family)	Stephens; Dave Tozer	3:23
28.	"What a Wonderful World"	Bob Thiele; George David Weiss	2:16
Total length:			94:25

Notes

- "Baby, It's Cold Outside" contains additional writing by John Legend and Natasha Rothwell.

== Charts ==
=== Weekly charts ===
Chart (2018–2025)	Peak position
Australian Albums (ARIA)	39
Belgian Albums (Ultratop Flanders)	132
Canadian Albums (Billboard)	44
Dutch Albums (Album Top 100)	23
Italian Albums (FIMI)	77
Japanese Albums (Oricon)	196
Portuguese Streaming Albums (AFP)	147
Scottish Albums (Official Charts)	76
Swedish Albums (Sverigetopplistan)	17
US Billboard 200	22
US Top Holiday Albums (Billboard)	1
US Top R&B/Hip-Hop Albums (Billboard)	8

=== Year-end charts ===
Chart (2019)	Position
US Top R&B/Hip-Hop Albums (Billboard)	91
Chart (2020)	Position
US Top R&B/Hip-Hop Albums (Billboard)	91

== Certifications ==
Region	Certification	Certified units/sales
United States (RIAA)	Gold	500,000^{‡}
^{‡} Sales+streaming figures based on certification alone.
