= Text Me Merry Christmas =

Single by Straight No Chaser featuring Kristen Bell

from the album Under the Influence (Holiday edition)
- Released: November 17, 2014
- Genre: A capella, Christmas
- Length: 2:40
- Label: Atlantic Records
- Songwriters: Adam Schlesinger, David Javerbaum

Music video
- "Text Me Merry Christmas" on YouTube

"Text Me Merry Christmas" is a song performed by Straight No Chaser and Kristen Bell. It was written by Adam Schlesinger and David Javerbaum. The song was released on November 17, 2014.

== Lyrics ==
Written to convey "how informal communication has become", the group picked Bell immediately upon deciding the song should be a duet. Bell found it "a blast" to perform in the a cappella style. Bell's male counterpart is Michael Luginbill. The song touches on a common theme for Christmas music, that of being apart.

== Reception ==
Upon release, Billboard called the tune both "catchy" and "goofy". Within three days of its release, the official YouTube video had garnered 1.7 million views. The song reached number 56 on the Billboard Holiday 100 on December 19, 2014. The song gained popularity within South Korea and remains a known Christmas song in Korea with K-pop artists covering it.

== Charts ==
Chart performance for "Text Me Merry Christmas"
Chart (2014–2021)	Peak position
South Korea (Gaon)	55
US Adult Contemporary (Billboard)	30
US Holiday 100 (Billboard)	56
