= DJ Play a Christmas Song =

2023 single by Cher

Single by Cher

from the album Christmas
- Released: October 6, 2023
- Genre: Dance-pop; Christmas; disco
- Length: 3:29
- Label: Warner
- Songwriters: Sarah Hudson; Jesse Saint John; Brett McLaughlin; James Abrahart; Mark Schick; Lionel Crasta
- Producer: Mark Taylor

Cher singles chronology
"Chiquitita" (2020)	"DJ Play a Christmas Song" (2023)	"Christmas Is Here" (2025)

Lyric video
- "DJ Play a Christmas Song" on YouTube

"DJ Play a Christmas Song" is a song by American singer and actress Cher, released as the lead single of her twenty-seventh studio album Christmas. The song was digitally released on October 6, 2023, by Warner. It was produced by Mark Taylor, with lyrics written by Sarah Hudson, Jessie Saint John, Brett McLaughlin, James Abrahart, Mark Schick and Lionel Crasta. It became Cher's first entry on the US Billboard Hot 100 in 21 years, peaking at number 90 on the chart. It also reached the top of both the US Billboard Dance/Electronic Digital Song Sales and Adult Contemporary charts, making Cher the only solo artist to have at least one number-one song on any Billboard chart in each of the last seven decades.

== Composition ==
The song is performed in the key of G♭ major with a tempo of 134 beats per minute in common time. It follows a chord progression of G♭sus2 – B♭m7 – C♭(add 2) – D♭sus, with a key change to A♭ major for the last two choruses. Cher’s vocals span from G♭3 to C5 in the song. Cher once again applies AutoTune to her vocals, as she had previously done on her 1998 song "Believe," on which she famously used the effect.

== Promotion and performances ==
Cher debuted "DJ Play a Christmas Song" on October 3, 2023, at Silencio nightclub in Paris, performing at a private event hosted by Rabanne and H&M. She later performed the song during the Macy's Thanksgiving Day Parade on November 23, 2023. Cher performed "DJ Play a Christmas Song" on the German TV show Wetten, dass..? on November 25, 2023. She taped her performance for the 91st annual Christmas in Rockefeller Center Christmas Tree Lighting on November 19, 2023, and it aired on NBC on November 29, 2023. On December 1, 2023, Cher appeared on The Graham Norton Show, being interviewed and performing the single. She performed the song on the finale of Strictly Come Dancing on December 16, 2023. Cher also performed the song for the iHeartRadio's Jingle Ball on December 8, 2023 at Madison Square Garden. Cher performed the song on the Christmas episode of Saturday Night Live on December 20, 2025.

== Critical reception ==
The song received a positive review from Attitude's Jamie Tabberer, who gave the song four out of five stars, calling it a "cut-glass powerhouse pop-dance banger".

== Commercial performance ==
"DJ Play a Christmas Song" debuted at number 94 on the US Billboard Hot 100 the week of December 30, 2023, becoming Cher's first entry on the Hot 100 since "Song for the Lonely" in May 2002. It rose to number 90 the following week. The song entered the US Billboard Dance/Electronic Digital Song Sales chart at number three, becoming her highest-peaking song on that chart. Weeks later, it climbed to number one, making Cher the only solo artist to have had a number-one song on at least one Billboard chart in each of the last seven decades. The song also topped the US Billboard Adult Contemporary chart, making it her first single since "If I Could Turn Back Time" (1989) to top the chart and spent four consecutive weeks at the top.

In the UK, the song peaked at number 18 on the Official Singles Chart, becoming Cher's first single to reach the top 20 since her song "The Music's No Good Without You" (2001). Additionally, Cher became the oldest female artist to have a top-40 hit with new material, as well as being the only solo artist to have a top-40 hit in the UK in seven consecutive decades. The song returned to the UK top 40 in 2024 reaching number 39, and again in 2025 reaching number 37.

In Germany, the song entered the German Singles chart at number 92, and rose to number 62 the following week. In Australia it entered the ARIA Singles Chart at number 45.

== Track listing ==
Digital download and streaming – Single

1. "DJ Play a Christmas Song" – 3:29

Digital download and streaming – DJ Mixes

1. "DJ Play a Christmas Song" (Robin Schulz Remix) – 3:30
2. "DJ Play a Christmas Song" (Chrome Tapes) – 5:10
3. "DJ Play a Christmas Song" (Chrome Tapes Instrumental) – 5:10
4. "DJ Play a Christmas Song" (7th Heaven Club Mix) – 6:41
5. "DJ Play a Christmas Song" (7th Heaven Club Edit) – 3:47
6. "DJ Play a Christmas Song" (Guy Scheiman Remix) – 6:02
7. "DJ Play a Christmas Song" (Extended) – 5:15
8. "DJ Play a Christmas Song" (Extended Instrumental) – 5:15

== Personnel ==
Credits are adapted from the liner notes of Christmas.

- Cher – lead vocals
- Rita Campbell – background vocals
- Ash Soan – drums
- Adam Phillips – guitar
- Mark Taylor – producer, keyboards, programming, mixing
- Paul Meehan – keyboards, programming
- Alex Arias – vocal engineer
- Gabe Burch – vocal engineer
- Peter Jensen – assistant vocal engineer
- Stephen Marcussen – mastering
- Sarah Hudson – songwriter
- Jessie Saint John – songwriter
- Brett McLaughlin – songwriter
- James Abrahart – songwriter
- Mark Schick – songwriter
- Lionel Crasta – songwriter

== Charts ==
=== Weekly charts ===
Weekly chart performance for "DJ Play a Christmas Song"
Chart (2023–2025)	Peak position
Australia (ARIA)	45
Austria (Ö3 Austria Top 40)	58
Canada Hot 100 (Billboard)	53
Canada AC (Billboard)	9
Croatia Airplay (HRT)	34
Germany (GfK)	62
Global 200 (Billboard)	93
Ireland (IRMA)	12
Lebanon (Lebanese Top 20)	9
Lithuania (AGATA)	82
Netherlands (Single Top 100)	100
New Zealand (Recorded Music NZ)	39
Sweden Heatseeker (Sverigetopplistan)	1
Sweden (DigiListan)	9
Switzerland (Schweizer Hitparade)	61
UK Singles (Official Charts)	18
US Billboard Hot 100	90
US Adult Contemporary (Billboard)	1
US Holiday 100 (Billboard)	82
US Hot Dance/Electronic Songs (Billboard)	3
US Pop Airplay (Billboard)	40

=== Year-end charts ===
Year-end chart performance for "DJ Play a Christmas Song"
Chart (2024)	Position
US Adult Contemporary (Billboard)	30
US Hot Dance/Electronic Songs (Billboard)	43

== Certifications ==
Certifications for "DJ Play a Christmas Song"
Region	Certification	Certified units/sales
United Kingdom (BPI)	Silver	200,000^{‡}
^{‡} Sales+streaming figures based on certification alone.

== Remix with Kelly Clarkson ==
"DJ Play a Christmas Song" (remix with Kelly Clarkson)

Single by Cher and Kelly Clarkson
- Released: November 8, 2024
- Genre: Christmas
- Length: 4:02
- Label: Warner
- Songwriters: Sarah Hudson; Jesse Saint; John Brett McLaughlin; James Abrahart; Mark Schick; Lionel Crasta
- Producer: Mark Taylor

Kelly Clarkson singles chronology
"You for Christmas" (2024)	"DJ Play a Christmas Song" (remix with Kelly Clarkson) (2024)	"Where Have You Been" (2025)

On November 8, 2024, a new version with Kelly Clarkson was released.

=== Background ===
Prior to the remix's release, Clarkson first covered the song as part of her Kellyoke segment on her talk show on December 19, 2023. Cher responded to Clarkson's rendition on her X account claiming that Clarkson had "aced it".

=== Commercial performance ===
The remix with Clarkson entered the Billboard Dance/Electronic Digital Song Sales chart at number three on November 23, 2024, making it Clarkson's first entry on the chart.

=== Track listing ===
Digital download and streaming – Single

1. "DJ Play a Christmas Song" – 4:02

=== Charts ===
Chart performance for DJ Play a Christmas Song
Chart (2024)	Peak position
US Hot Dance/Electronic Songs (Billboard)	33

== Duet with Giovanni Zarrella ==
"DJ Play a Christmas Song" (Duet with Giovanni Zarrella)

Single by Cher and Giovanni Zarrella
- Released: November 15, 2024
- Length: 3:29
- Label: Warner
- Songwriters: Sarah Hudson; Jesse Saint; John Brett McLaughlin; James Abrahart; Mark Schick; Lionel Crasta
- Producer: Mark Taylor

Giovanni Zarrella singles chronology
"Mi Piace" (2024)	"DJ Play a Christmas Song" (Duet with Giovanni Zarrella) (2024)

On November 15, 2024, a new version with Giovanni Zarrella was released. The song was released as a single to Italian radio stations the same day.

=== Track listing ===
Digital download and streaming – Single

1. "DJ Play a Christmas Song" – 3:29

== Duet with Belinda ==
On November 29, 2024, Cher released a new duet version with Belinda.

=== Track listing ===
Digital download and streaming – Single

1. "DJ Play a Christmas Song" – 3:30

== Release history ==
Release dates and format(s) for "DJ Play a Christmas Song"
Region	Date	Format	Version	Label	Ref.
Various	October 6, 2023	Digital download; streaming	Original	Warner	
Various	December 1, 2023	Digital download; streaming	DJ Mixes	Warner	
Various	November 8, 2024	Digital download; streaming	Remix with Kelly Clarkson	Warner	
Various	November 15, 2024	Digital download; streaming	Duet with Giovani Zarrella	Warner	
Italy	November 15, 2024	Radio airplay	Duet with Giovani Zarrella	Warner	
Various	November 29, 2024	Digital download; streaming	Duet with Belinda	Warner	
