= Talk to Me (Damiano David, Tyla and Nile Rodgers song) =

Single by Damiano David, Tyla and Nile Rodgers

from the album Funny Little Fears (Dreams)
- Released: 11 September 2025
- Length: 3:13
- Label: Arista; Sony Italy
- Songwriters: Damiano David; John Hill; Sarah Aarons; Sammy Witte
- Producers: John Hill; Sammy Witte

Damiano David singles chronology
"The First Time" (2025)	"Talk to Me" (2025)

Tyla singles chronology
"PBT" (2025)	"Talk to Me" (2025)	"Body Go" (2025)

Nile Rodgers singles chronology
"I'm Going Out" (2025)	"Talk to Me" (2025)	"Le Freak (Where I Wanna Be)" (2025)

Music video
- "Talk to Me" on YouTube

"Talk to Me" is a song by Italian singer-songwriter Damiano David, South African singer Tyla, and American musician Nile Rodgers, released on 11 September 2025, through Arista Records and Sony Music Italy. It is featured on the deluxe edition of David's debut studio album, Funny Little Fears (Dreams). A music video for the song premiered the following day, on 12 September, and on the same day, "Talk to Me" was sent to contemporary hit radio in Italy. David led the songwriting for the song, joined by John Hill and Sammy Witte, who also handled production. Sarah Aarons contributed additional songwriting.

== Personnel ==
Credits were adpted from Apple Music.

Musicians

- Damiano David – lead vocals, background vocals, songwriter
- Tyla – lead vocals
- Nile Rodgers – electric guitar
- Florian Gouello – drums
- John Hill – drum programming, producer, acoustic guitar, songwriter
- Sarah Aarons – background vocals, songwriter
- Daniel Aged – bass
- Carlos Santana Arevalo – synthesizer, electric guitar
- Tommy King – keyboards
- Sammy Witte – producer, songwriter, moog, drum programming

Technical

- Florian Gouello – engineer
- Jon Yeston – engineer
- Walker Steele – assistant engineer, vocal recording engineer
- Manny Marroquin – mixing engineer
- Zach Pereyra – mastering engineer

== Charts ==
=== Weekly charts ===
Weekly chart performance for "Talk to Me"
Chart (2025–2026)	Peak position
Argentina Anglo Airplay (Monitor Latino)	11
Belgium (Ultratop 50 Flanders)	44
Bulgaria Airplay (PROPHON)	5
CIS Airplay (TopHit)	38
Costa Rica Anglo Airplay (Monitor Latino)	11
Croatia International Airplay (Top lista)	26
Czech Republic Airplay (ČNS IFPI)	2
Denmark Airplay (Tracklisten)	4
Estonia Airplay (TopHit)	11
Finland Airplay (Radiosoittolista)	11
Hungary (Editors' Choice Top 40)	11
Italy Airplay (EarOne)	4
Japan Hot Overseas (Billboard Japan)	8
Kazakhstan Airplay (TopHit)	33
Latvia Airplay (LaIPA)	6
Lebanon English (Lebanese Top 20)	16
Lithuania Airplay (TopHit)	22
Netherlands (Dutch Top 40)	15
Netherlands Airplay (Radiomonitor)	2
North Macedonia Airplay (Radiomonitor)	1
Panama Anglo Airplay (Monitor Latino)	12
Paraguay Anglo Airplay (Monitor Latino)	7
Poland (Polish Airplay Top 100)	2
Romania Airplay (Media Forest)	19
Romania TV Airplay (Media Forest)	17
San Marino Airplay (SMRTV Top 50)	12
Slovakia Airplay (ČNS IFPI)	32
Slovenia Airplay (Radiomonitor)	13
South Africa Airplay (TOSAC)	7
Spain Airplay (Promusicae)	10
Turkey International Airplay (Radiomonitor Türkiye)	3
Ukraine Airplay (TopHit)	102

=== Monthly charts ===
Monthly chart performance for "Talk to Me"
Chart (2025–2026)	Peak position
CIS Airplay (TopHit)	47
Estonia Airplay (TopHit)	18
Kazakhstan Airplay (TopHit)	41
Lithuania Airplay (TopHit)	28
Romania Airplay (TopHit)	27

=== Year-end charts ===
Year-end chart performance for "Talk to Me"
Chart (2025)	Position
Estonia Airplay (TopHit)	129
Netherlands (Dutch Top 40)	74
Poland (Polish Airplay Top 100)	46
Romania Airplay (TopHit)	125

== Release history ==
Release history for "Talk to Me"
Region	Date	Format(s)	Label(s)	Ref.
Various	11 September 2025	Digital download; streaming	Arista; Sony Italy	
Italy	12 September 2025	Contemporary hit radio	Sony Italy	
United States	24 September 2025	Contemporary hit radio	Sony Italy	
