= Naked Truth (Sarah Hudson album) =

Studio album by Sarah Hudson
- Released: September 7, 2004
- Genre: Pop; rock
- Length: 40:01
- Label: EMI; S-Curve
- Producer: Randy Cantor; Desmond Child; Michael Mangini; Billy Mann; Jodi Marr; Guy Roche

Professional ratings
Review scores
Source	Rating
Allmusic	2.5/5 stars

Naked Truth is the debut studio album by American singer-songwriter Sarah Hudson. It was released on September 7, 2004, through EMI Records and S-Curve Records.

Track #6, "Unlove You", was covered by Ashley Tisdale on her 2007 debut album "Headstrong".

== Track listing ==
No.	Title	Writer(s)	Length
1.	"Naked Truth"	Sarah Hudson; Billy Mann	3:26
2.	"Girl on the Verge"	S. Hudson; Eric Bazilian; Desmond Child	3:14
3.	"Strange"	S. Hudson; Dean Grakal; Robert Thiele	3:27
4.	"I Know"	S. Hudson; Grakal; Steve Balsamo; Mark Hudson	4:08
5.	"Little"	S. Hudson; Bazilian; Grakal	3:37
6.	"Unlove You"	S. Hudson; Shelly Peiken; Guy Roche	3:23
7.	"Gandhi"	S. Hudson; Mann; G. Burr; V. Shaw	3:35
8.	"Call It My Life"	S. Hudson; Grakal; Peter Amato; Christine Rumbley	3:17
9.	"Sentimental Saturday"	S. Hudson; Emerson Swinford; Guy Erez	4:26
10.	"Fake Rain"	S. Hudson; Child; Randy Cantor; Jodi Marr	4:18
11.	"Bad Habit"	S. Hudson; Peiken; Roche	3:12
Total length:			40:01

== Personnel ==
- Sarah Hudson - vocal, background vocals
- John R. Angier - piano
- Eric Bazilian - guitar
- Cindy Blackman - drums
- Gordon Brown - guitar
- Desmond Child - background vocals
- Jack Daley - bass
- Doug Emery - keyboard
- Jimmy Farkas - synthesizer, guitar, Wurlitzer
- Steve Greenwell - bass, keyboard
- Mark Hudson - guitar
- Storm Lee - background vocals
- Jon Leidersdorff - drums
- Lee Levin - drums
- Michael Mangini - keyboard
- Billy Mann - acoustic guitar, slide guitar
- Jodi Marr - background vocals
- Rob Mueller - guitar
- Shelly Peiken - background vocals
- Paul Pimsler - electric guitar
- Christopher Rojas - keyboard programming, drum programming
- Steven Tyler - background vocals
- Dan Warner - guitar
- Steven Wolf - drums

== Production ==
- Producers: Randy Cantor, Desmond Child, Michael Mangini, Billy Mann, Jodi Marr, Guy Roche
- Executive producer: Joanna Ifrah
- Engineers: Carlos Alvarez, Dushyant Bhakta, Conrad Golding, Jules Gondar, Steve Greenwell, Greg Landon, Craig Lozowick, Nathan Malki, Marcelo Marulanda
- Mixing: Carlos Alvarez, Steve Greenwell, Chris Lord-Alge
- Mixing assistant: Dim e
- Mastering: Ted Jensen
- Programming: Doug Emery, Steve Greenwell, Michael Mangini, Billy Mann, Christopher Rojas, Pete Wallace
- Drum programming: Lee Levin
- Production coordination: Brian Coleman
- Arrangers: Billy Mann, Christopher Rojas, Pete Wallace
- Illustrations: Rick Cortes
- Photography: Sheryl Nields
