= Changing (Kevin Jonas song) =

2025 single by Kevin Jonas

Single by Kevin Jonas
- Released: November 20, 2025
- Genre: Pop
- Length: 3:02
- Label: PKJ Records; Hollywood Records
- Songwriters: Kevin Jonas; James Abrahart; Sarah Hudson; Jason Evigan; Mark Schick
- Producers: Jason Evigan; Mark Schick

Kevin Jonas singles chronology
"Changing" (2025)	"Little Things" (2026)

"Changing" is the debut single by American singer and musician Kevin Jonas. It was released by Jonas' own label, PKJ Records, on November 20, 2025. "Changing" marks Jonas' official debut as a solo artist, after years of performing exclusively with his younger brothers Joe and Nick.

== Background and release ==
Jonas has opened up about how reluctant he was to sing lead vocals on Jonas Brothers records, citing self-doubt. In an interview with Zach Sang, Jonas "felt like I didn't have it in me," after watching his siblings perform every night. He says, "It's a little difficult. You've heard [Joe and Nick] sing. So, you grow up watching people just crush it and kill it every single night. And also it takes a lot. I know how much it takes to be present vocally, constantly. I don't believe I had the chops to do it."

Jonas performed the song live for the first time on August 23, 2025, in Boston, Massachusetts, during the Jonas20: Greetings from Your Hometown Tour. On October 26, 2025, during the band's Samsung TV Plus concert livestream in Orlando, Florida as part of their Jonas20 tour, Jonas announced the release date for "Changing", which was November 20, 2025.

"Changing" reflects on personal growth. Jonas states the songs is "evocative of going through the motions with life and continuously trying to improve yourself... Life keeps changing, and the song is a positive reinforcement of that idea... You need to know when to move on to the next thing, and you also need to keep moving, no matter what the situation or relationship is."

== Critical reception ==
Danielle Holian of Atwood Magazine says that "Changing" is "a song that refuses the theatrical shock that often accompanies a solo debut from a well-established band member." Holian specifies, "There's no stylistic curveball, no attempt to carve out sonic distance from the Jonas Brothers catalogue. Instead, Kevin leans into what has always defined him: sincerity, warmth, melodic instinct." Reagan Denning of Melodic Magazine says, "The song beautifully showcases Kevin's higher vocal range. And of course, it ends with an epic guitar solo, the perfect finishing touch to a powerful debut."

== Charts ==
Chart performance for "Changing"
Chart (2025)	Peak position
US Adult Pop Airplay	40
Dominican Republic Anglo Airplay	18
Panama Anglo Airplay	9
Paraguay Anglo Airplay	15
