= Christmas (Cher album) =

Studio album by Cher
- Released: October 20, 2023
- Recorded: Mid-2023
- Genres: Christmas; pop; dance-pop
- Length: 39:48
- Label: Warner
- Producers: Mark Taylor; Alexander Edwards; Ryan OG; Mike Crook

Cher chronology
Dancing Queen (2018)	Christmas (2023)	Forever (2024)

Alternative cover
- Deluxe Edition and Amazon exclusive vinyl album cover

Singles from Christmas
- 1. "DJ Play a Christmas Song" Released: October 6, 2023

Christmas is the twenty-seventh studio album and first Christmas album by American singer and actress Cher. It was released by Warner Records on October 20, 2023 and it is her first effort featuring original material in a decade. Primarly produced by Mark Taylor, the album features cover versions of popular Christmas songs in addition to four new tracks and also features five duets with singers Stevie Wonder, Cyndi Lauper, Darlene Love, Michael Bublé and Tyga. A deluxe edition of the album was released on December 6, 2024 featuring six remixes of songs from the album.

== Background ==
Cher first announced a plan to record a Christmas album in 2018. However, no progress was made at this time, and she did not comment again on this album until hinting at its production in July 2023, when she announced that she was already working on material for it. On Twitter, she shared that she never wanted to do a festive album but it came out "as good as any record" she has made. In an interview with Good Morning Britain in September, Cher expressed her pride over the record, saying that it is "a Cher Christmas album. It's not your mother's Christmas album". On September 7, Cher unveiled the album's artwork, accompanied by a caption asking the reader if they wanted to share Christmas with her. The cover depicts a simple shot of the singer surrounded by Christmas ornaments. She is seen wearing a white shirt and bedazzled blue jeans. Target exclusive versions of the album consists of 4 different colored versions of Cher's name. An alternative cover with Cher in pink version of her outfit on the standard album and kicking a splash of water was released exclusively to Cher's official store, while Amazon versions had another exclusive alternative cover with Cher in a silver bejeweled dress surrounded by water and icebergs.

The project features guest appearances by Darlene Love, Michael Bublé, Tyga, Cyndi Lauper, and Stevie Wonder. Cher shared her excitement over the fact that there are "millions of people" on it and that she never released an album with duets. According to her, the decision to include guest artists was "last-minute".

Four songs from the album are original works: "DJ Play a Christmas Song", "Angels in the Snow", "Drop Top Sleigh Ride", and "Christmas Ain't Christmas Without You".

== Singles ==
On October 6, 2023, Cher released "DJ Play a Christmas Song" as the lead single from the album. "DJ Play a Christmas Song" debuted at number 94 on the US Billboard Hot 100 on the chart dated December 30, 2023, becoming Cher's first entry on the Hot 100 since "Song for the Lonely" in May 2002. On the week ending October 21, 2023, the song entered the US Billboard Dance/Electronic Digital Song Sales chart at number three, reaching the number one position six weeks later (on the week-ending December 2, 2023). On the week ending November 18, 2023, the song entered the US Billboard Adult Contemporary chart at number 22, attaining the number one position three weeks later (on the week-ending December 9, 2023). In the United Kingdom, the song reached number 18 on the UK Singles Chart. Alternative duet versions with Kelly Clarkson, Giovanni Zarrella and Belinda Peregrín were released in November 2024.

In Canada, the album tracks "DJ Play a Christmas Song", "What Christmas Means to Me" with Stevie Wonder, "Run Rudolph Run", and "Christmas (Baby Please Come Home)" with Darlene Love gained airplay, charting on the Canadian AC chart, peaking at numbers nine, four, twenty-one, and twenty-five respectively. "DJ Play a Christmas Song" reached number 53 on the Canadian Hot 100.

On December 6, 2024, Cher released the "Discotastique! Mix" version of "Angels in the Snow", as a promotional single for the deluxe version of the album, which was released digitally on the same day.

In 2025, Cher released a new single, "Christmas is Here". The song was later included in the deluxe a year later.

== Critical reception ==
Professional ratings
Review scores
Source	Rating
AllMusic	3.5/5 stars
BroadwayWorld	5/5
Retropop	4/5 stars
Slant Magazine	2.5/5 stars

Matt Collar of AllMusic rated the album three and a half out of five stars and stated that Cher’s Christmas puts her unique touch on a mix of original songs and holiday classics. He highlighted tracks like the dance-oriented "DJ Play a Christmas Song" and the hip-hop-influenced "Drop Top Sleigh Ride," featuring Tyga, as standout moments.

Bobby Patrick from BroadwayWorld rated Christmas 5 out of 5, praising the album as a must-have holiday collection. He praised the collaborations with artists like Darlene Love, Michael Bublé, and Stevie Wonder, and commended Cher's enduring power and relevance in the music industry, calling the album a celebration of her timeless voice and energy.

Connor Gotto from Retropop praised Cher’s collaborations, especially the "powerhouse duet" with Darlene Love on "Christmas (Baby Please Come Home)" and Stevie Wonder's joyful contribution to "What Christmas Means to Me". While Gotto found the reworked "Home" with Michael Bublé a bit off-key, he lauded the album for its overall joy, calling it quintessentially Cher.

== Commercial performance ==
Christmas debuted at number 32 on the US Billboard 200 and number one on the Top Holiday Albums chart with 21,000 album-equivalent units, from which 20,000 comprised album sales. Christmas was declared by Billboard the top-selling seasonal collection of 2023 by traditional album sales, with 133,000 copies sold in the US during the Nov. 4, 2023 through Jan. 6, 2024 period.

In the United Kingdom, the album debuted at number 42 on the UK Albums Chart. In the week of December 22, 2023, it rose to number 5.

== Track listing ==
All tracks produced by Mark Taylor; except "Drop Top Sleigh Ride" produced by Alexander Edwards, Ryan OG, and Mike Crook.

Christmas Standard edition track listing
No.	Title	Writer(s)	Length
1.	"DJ Play a Christmas Song"	Sarah Hudson; Jesse Saint John; Brett McLaughlin; James Abrahart; Mark Schick; Lionel Crasta	3:29
2.	"What Christmas Means to Me" (with Stevie Wonder)	Anna Gaye; Allen Story; George Gordy	2:35
3.	"Run Rudolph Run"	Chuck Berry; Johnny Marks; Marvin Brodie	2:53
4.	"Christmas (Baby Please Come Home)" (with Darlene Love)	Ellie Greenwich; Jeff Barry; Phil Spector	2:43
5.	"Angels in the Snow"	Ferras; Hudson; Saint John; McLaughlin; Abrahart; Schick; Crasta	2:52
6.	"Home" (with Michael Bublé)	Bublé; Alan Chang; Amy Foster-Gillies	3:44
7.	"Drop Top Sleigh Ride" (with Tyga)	McLaughlin; Ferras; Abrahart; Saint John; Crasta; Schick; Michael Stevenson; Hudson	3:20
8.	"Please Come Home for Christmas"	Charles Brown; Gene Redd	2:55
9.	"I Like Christmas"	Bryan Frasher; Maxwell Frasher; Traci Frasher	2:59
10.	"Christmas Ain't Christmas Without You"	Alexis Francis; Mark Taylor; Patrick Mascall; Paul Barry	2:55
11.	"Santa Baby"	Joan Javits; Philip Springer; Tony Springer	3:21
12.	"Put a Little Holiday in Your Heart" (with Cyndi Lauper)	Greg Wojahn; Rodger Wojahn; Scott Wojahn	3:07
13.	"This Will Be Our Year"	Chris White	2:14
Total length:			39:48

Christmas Deluxe edition track listing
No.	Title	Writer(s)	Length
14.	"Christmas is Here"	Hudson; Saint John; McLaughlin; Abrahart; Schick; Crasta	3:06
15.	"DJ Play a Christmas Song" (with Kelly Clarkson)	Hudson; Saint John; McLaughlin; Abrahart; Schick; Crasta	4:02
16.	"DJ Play a Christmas Song" (with Giovanni Zarrella)	Hudson; Saint John; McLaughlin; Abrahart; Schick; Crasta	3:29
17.	"DJ Play a Christmas Song" (with Belinda)	Hudson; Saint John; McLaughlin; Abrahart; Schick; Crasta	3:30
18.	"Angels in the Snow" (Discotastique! Mix)	Ferras; Hudson; Saint John; McLaughlin; Abrahart; Schick; Crasta	3:14
19.	"DJ Play a Christmas Song" (Extended)	Hudson; Saint John; McLaughlin; Abrahart; Schick; Crasta	5:15
20.	"DJ Play a Christmas Song" (Chrome Tapes)	Hudson; Saint John; McLaughlin; Abrahart; Schick; Crasta	5:10
Total length:			64:28

== Charts ==
=== Weekly charts ===
Weekly chart performance for Christmas
Chart (2023–2024)	Peak position
Australian Albums (ARIA)	40
Austrian Albums (Ö3 Austria)	7
Belgian Albums (Ultratop Flanders)	49
Belgian Albums (Ultratop Wallonia)	45
Canadian Albums (Billboard)	37
Croatian International Albums (HDU)	16
Dutch Albums (Album Top 100)	54
French Physical Albums (SNEP)	47
German Albums (Offizielle Top 100)	9
Hungarian Albums (MAHASZ)	17
Irish Albums (IRMA)	66
Lithuanian Albums (AGATA)	55
New Zealand Albums (RMNZ)	18
Poland Streaming Albums (ZPAV)	71
Portugal Top Albums (AFP)	59
Scottish Albums (Official Charts)	4
Spanish Albums (Promusicae)	60
Swedish Albums (Sverigetopplistan)	23
Swiss Albums (Schweizer Hitparade)	12
Swiss Albums (Schweizer Hitparade Romandy)	10
UK Albums (Official Charts)	5
US Billboard 200	32
US Top Holiday Albums (Billboard)	1

=== Year-end charts ===
2023 year-end chart performance for Christmas
Chart (2023)	Position
Hungarian Physical Albums (MAHASZ)	72

2024 year-end chart performance for Christmas
Chart (2024)	Position
Hungarian Albums (MAHASZ)	77
US Billboard Top Album Sales	41
US Billboard Top Current Album Sales	33

== Release history ==
Release dates and format(s) for Christmas
Region	Date	Format	Version	Label	Ref.
Various	October 20, 2023	CD; vinyl; digital download; streaming	Standard	Warner	
Various	December 6, 2024	Digital download; streaming	Deluxe	Warner	
