= Christmas Cheers =

Studio album by Straight No Chaser
- Released: November 3, 2009 (US)
- Recorded: 2009
- Genre: Christmas music A cappella
- Length: 39:31
- Label: Atlantic

Straight No Chaser chronology
Holiday Spirits (2008)	Christmas Cheers (2009)	With a Twist (2010)

Christmas Cheers is the second studio album by American men's a cappella singing group, Straight No Chaser, produced with Deke Sharon. It was released in the US on November 3, 2009. It has peaked to number 38 on the U.S. Billboard 200.

== Track listing ==
No.	Title	Length
1.	"The Christmas Can-Can"	2:42
2.	"We Three Kings"	2:31
3.	"Christmastime Is Here"	2:18
4.	"Let It Snow"	3:01
5.	"Donde Esta Santa Claus"	2:29
6.	"I'll Be Home for Christmas"	3:05
7.	"Hey Santa!"	2:47
8.	"Rudolph the Red-Nosed Reindeer"	2:21
9.	"You're a Mean One, Mr. Grinch"	2:54
10.	"O Holy Night"	3:10
11.	"Santa Claus Is Back in Town"	2:37
12.	"God Rest Ye Merry Gentlemen"	2:35
13.	"Jingle Bells"	2:05
14.	"Who Spiked The Eggnog?"	2:07
15.	"The 12 Days of Christmas"	2:58

== Charts ==
=== Weekly charts ===
Chart (2009–2010)	Peak position
US Billboard 200	38
US Top Catalog Albums (Billboard)	14

=== Year-end charts ===
Chart (2010)	Position
US Billboard 200	192

== Certifications ==
Region	Certification	Certified units/sales
United States (RIAA)	Gold	500,000^{‡}
^{‡} Sales+streaming figures based on certification alone.

== Release history ==
Region	Release date	Label
United States	November 3, 2009	Atlantic Records
