= Damiano David =

Italian singer and songwriter (born 1999)

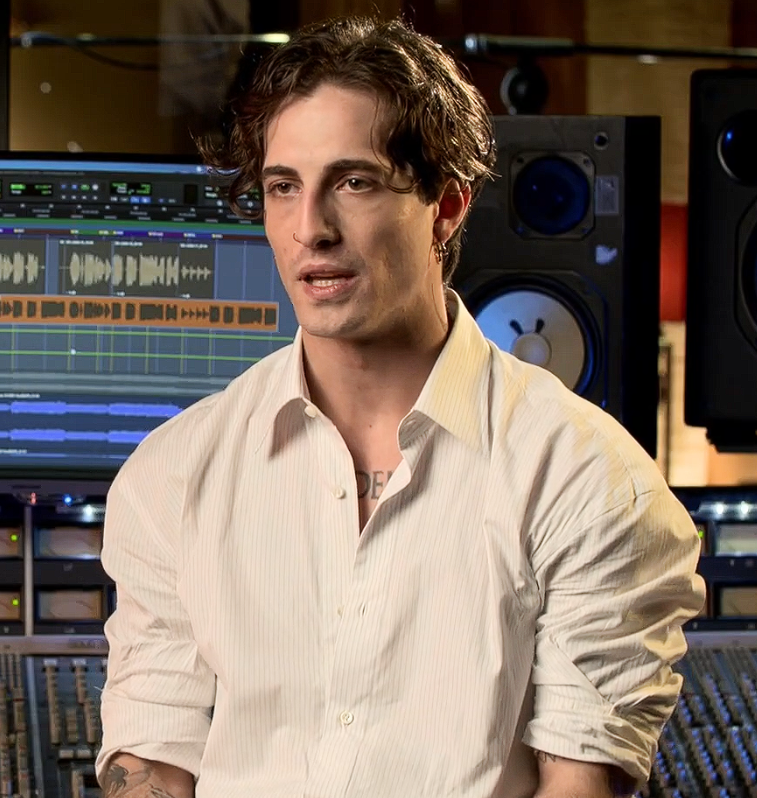
- David in 2025

Background information
- Born: 8 January 1999 (age 27); Rome, Lazio, Italy
- Genres: Pop rock; pop; alternative rock; glam rock; funk rock
- Occupations: Singer; songwriter
- Instruments: Vocals; guitar
- Years active: 2016–present
- Labels: Sony Italy; Arista
- Member of: Måneskin
- Spouse: Dove Cameron (m. 2026)
- Website: www.damianodavidofficial.com

Damiano David (Italian pronunciation: [daˈmjaːno ˈdaːvid], /dəˈviːd/; born 8 January 1999) is an Italian singer and songwriter. He is the frontman of the rock band Måneskin, which won the Sanremo Music Festival 2021 and subsequently the Eurovision Song Contest 2021 representing Italy with the song "Zitti e buoni". In 2024, David started his solo musical career with the singles "Silverlines" and "Born with a Broken Heart", which preceded his debut studio album Funny Little Fears (2025). He embarked on his first solo concert tour in 2025.

== Early life ==
David was born in Rome in the Lazio Region, to Daniele David and Rossella Scognamiglio, both flight attendants. Due to the nature of his parents' work, he and his older brother Jacopo travelled worldwide from an early age, which introduced them to various cultures. Until he was 17, he showed some talent playing basketball as a point guard at the local club Eurobasket Roma. He recalls that the basketball experience gave him fundamental discipline to succeed in his life.

== Career ==
David started singing when he was six years old. He met Victoria De Angelis and Thomas Raggi, with whom he would eventually go on to form Måneskin, during his high school days. He studied at the liceo linguistico Eugenio Montale in Rome, but he did not complete high school and instead devoted himself to his music career, for which he had the support of his parents. When introduced for the position of a vocalist for their local band, he was initially rejected because his style was considered "too pop", but his insistence to be in the band eventually got him accepted. David soon changed his demeanor and style, especially his stage persona, because he learned how to freely express himself. The band was formed in 2016 and initially played as buskers in the streets of the city of Rome, but in 2017 they soon rose to prominence when they finished second in the eleventh season of the Italian talent show X Factor. The band had a breakthrough debut with the studio album Il ballo della vita and tour in 2018 and 2019. In 2021 their second studio album Teatro d'ira: Vol. I was released.

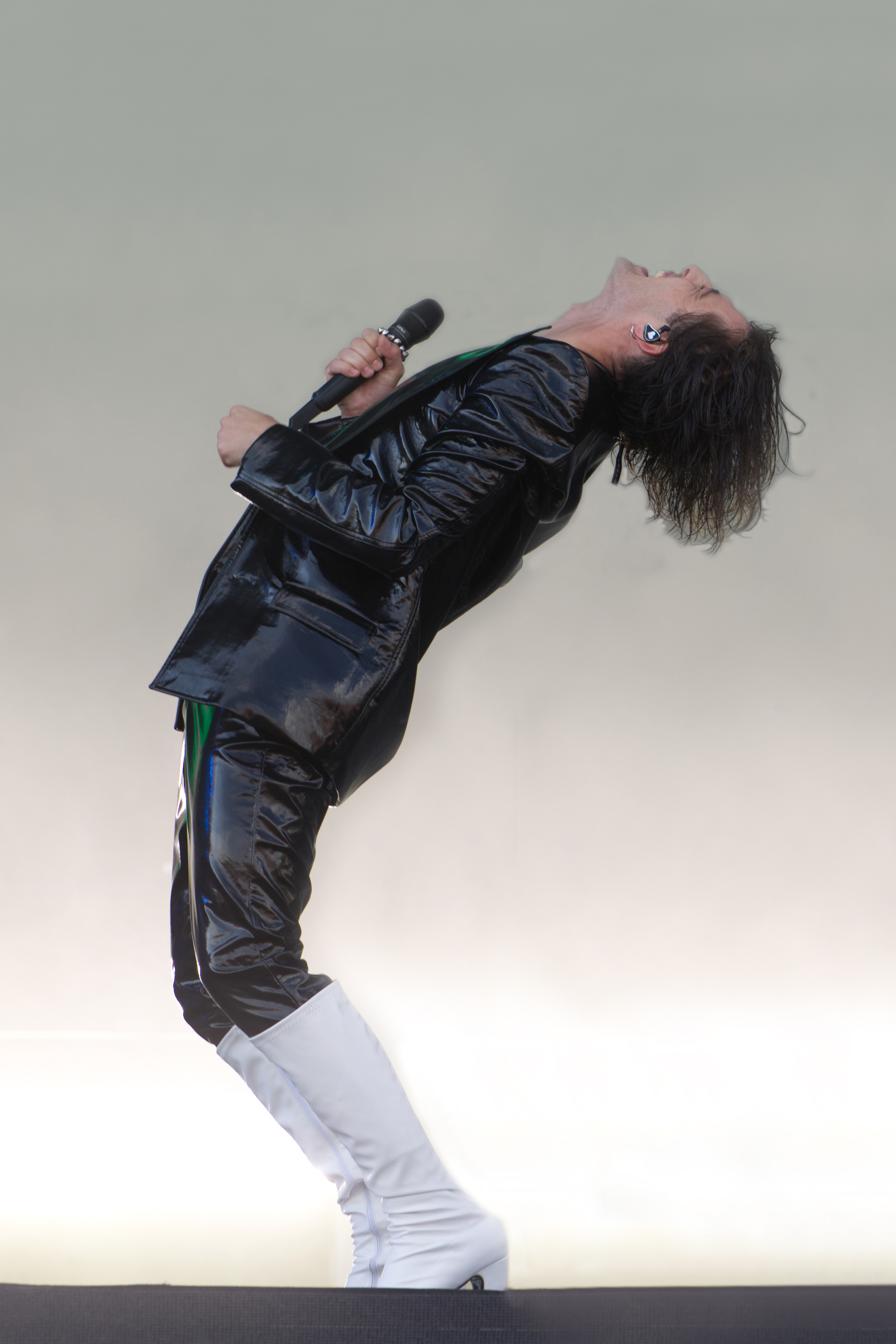
David performing at Rock im Park in 2022

In 2021 they won the Sanremo Music Festival 2021, the most popular music festival in Italy. After their victory at the Eurovision Song Contest 2021 he was falsely accused of drug use during the final. After the contest David, by his own initiative, underwent a drug test, which came back negative. David says that he has never used hard drugs and, along with his bandmates, is an anti-drug advocate. David himself stated in his Vogue Italia interview "we are not falling into the stereotype of the alcoholic and drugged rock star". He states, that he only drinks alcohol on special events. He believes that creativity comes from a "healthy, trained and lucid" mind and it is contradicting trying to truly express "our own self by binding ourselves to something that instead makes us dependent, slaves", also referring to the 27 Club.

David sang a cover version of the song "I Wanna Be Your Dog" by the Stooges as well as voicing the character of Jeffrey, assistant of the main antagonist, for the Italian dub of the 2021 film Cruella.

David appeared in the music video for the song "Mil Veces" by singer Anitta in 2023. In 2024 he started his solo musical career with the Labrinth-produced single "Silverlines", released on 27 September. In the following month his second single "Born with a Broken Heart" was released. In 2025 he was announced as a special guest of Sanremo Music Festival, where he performed in the second night. David's debut studio album, Funny Little Fears, was released on 16 May 2025 through Sony Music Italy and Arista Records.

== Artistry ==
In 2017 X-factor judge Fedez commented that David is a real frontman. In 2021 Manuel Agnelli praised him in similar words to have a "natural charisma of the great frontmen". His vocal style in 2017 was described as having a "reggae vocal timbre that allows him to masterfully deal with the rock repertoire, given that the band's musical influences range from indie rock to glam rock to pop rock". His characteristic androgynous look and fashion style on stage is seen as a mixture of hippie, vintage, and glam rock from the 1970s, because of which he has been labeled an Italian fashion icon.

In comparison to David's work with Måneskin, his solo work is characterized by softer, more pop sound. Upon the release of Funny Little Fears, Sonja Knežević of Vogue Adria wrote that he "traded the 'bad boy' title for the 'baby girl' title in a process that many have called the 'Harry-Stylesification' of Damiano David."

== Personal life ==
David was in a relationship with Italian model and influencer Giorgia Soleri for nearly six years. The pair split up in June 2023. In November 2023, he was reported to be in a relationship with American actress and singer Dove Cameron, with whom he made his first public appearance in February 2024. David and Cameron announced their engagement in January 2026. They married at the Palazzo dei Priori in Montalcino, Tuscany, Italy on September 24, 2026.

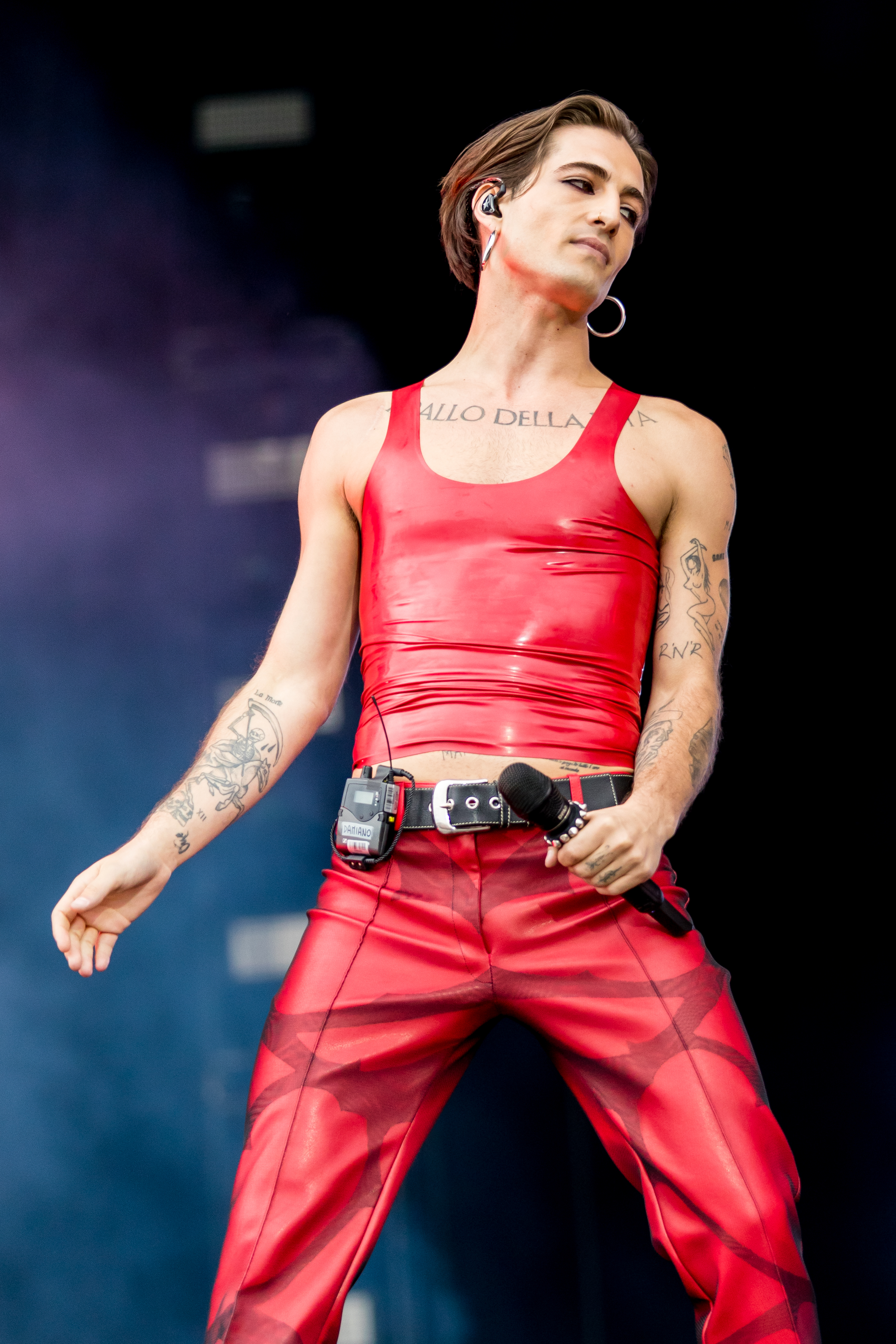
David performing at Rock im Park with Måneskin in 2022

In addition to Italian, David is fluent in English and can speak some Spanish and French. He is an advocate for racial and LGBTQ rights. David said he is against drugs and that he has never consumed them, stating: "Creativity comes from a healthy, trained, lucid mind. The brain is a machine that has to have its gears in place and drugs are just a huge filth … The message we want to spread with our music is the exaltation of man through his freedom, and how could we talk about the expression of his own self by binding ourselves to something that instead makes us dependent, slaves?". He is also a fan of association football club AS Roma.

David is fond of the symbolism of the Greek mythological character Icarus, having a tattoo of wings and a quote referring to Icarus on his hip, as well as formerly using "Ykaaar" as his username on the social media platform Instagram.

== Discography ==
=== Studio albums ===
List of studio albums with selected details
Title	Details	Peak chart positions										Certifications
Title	Details	ITA	AUT	BEL (FL)	BEL (WA)	FRA	GER	NLD	SWE	SWI	UK	Certifications
Funny Little Fears	Released: 16 May 2025; Label: Sony Italy, Arista; Formats: CD, LP, digital download, streaming	4	3	1	1	2	5	5	48	2	68	FIMI: Platinum; BRMA: Gold; SNEP: Platinum

=== Singles ===
List of singles as lead artist, showing year released, chart positions, certifications, and album name
Title	Year	Peak chart positions										Certifications	Album
Title	Year	ITA	BEL (FL)	BEL (WA)	CAN	CRO Intl. Air.	FRA	NLD	POL Air.	SWI	US Rock	Certifications	Album
"Silverlines"	2024	85	—	—	—	—	—	—	—	—	—		Funny Little Fears
"Born with a Broken Heart"	2024	24	4	3	95	6	21	10	2	54	18	FIMI: Platinum; BRMA: Gold; IFPI SWI: Gold; NVPI: Gold; SNEP: Diamond; ZPAV: Gold	Funny Little Fears
"Next Summer"	2025	50	6	8	—	20	52	—	1	60	—	BRMA: Gold; IFPI SWI: Gold; SNEP: Platinum	Funny Little Fears
"Zombie Lady"	2025	— (Note: "Zombie Lady" did not enter the FIMI Singles Chart, but peaked at number 5 on the EarOne's Italian Airplay chart.)	—	40	—	44	—	—	1	—	50		Funny Little Fears
"The First Time"	2025	55	4	8	—	—	61	9	2	68	—	FIMI: Gold; IFPI SWI: Gold; SNEP: Platinum	Funny Little Fears
"Talk to Me" (with Tyla and Nile Rodgers)	2025	— (Note: "Talk to Me" did not enter the FIMI Singles Chart, but peaked at number 4 on the EarOne's Italian Airplay chart.)	44	—	—	26	—	21	2	—	—		Funny Little Fears (Dreams)
"—" denotes a recording that did not chart or was not released in that territory.

=== Promotional singles ===
List of promotional singles, showing year released, chart positions and album name
Title	Year	Peak chart positions						Album
Title	Year	BLR Air.	CRO Int. Air.	ISR Int. Air.	LAT Air.	LTU Air.	PAN Ang Air.	Album
"Voices"	2025	88	20	14	3	31	16	Funny Little Fears

== Filmography ==
=== Film ===
Year	Title	Role	Notes
2021	Cruella	Jeffrey (voice)	Voiced the Italian-dubbed version of the film

=== Music videos ===
Year	Title	Artist(s)
2023	"Mil Veces"	Anitta

=== Commercials ===
Year	Campaign(s) / Product(s)	Brand(s)	Role	Ref
2024	"It turns you on" campaign	Maserati	Himself	

== Tours ==
- Funny Little Fears World Tour (2025)

== Awards and nominations ==
Year	Award	Category	Work	Result	Ref.
2025	FilmLight Colour Awards	Music Video	"Next Summer"	Won	
2025	Los 40 Music Awards	Best International Song	"Born with a Broken Heart"	Nominated	
2025	Los 40 Music Awards	Best International Album	Funny Little Fears	Nominated	
2025	MTV Video Music Awards	Push Performance of the Year	"Next Summer"	Nominated	
2025	MTV Video Music Awards	Best Long Form Video	Funny Little Stories	Nominated	
2025	RTHK International Pop Poll Awards	Top Male Singer	Himself	Nominated	
2025	RTHK International Pop Poll Awards	Top Ten International Gold Songs	"Next Summer"	Nominated	
2025	UK Music Video Awards	Best Editing in a Video	"Silverlines"	Nominated	
2026	Clio Awards	Music Film & Video Craft - Editing	"Silverlines"	Bronze	
2026	Hungarian Music Awards	Foreign Classic Pop/Rock Album	Funny Little Fears	Nominated	
