= With a Twist (Straight No Chaser album) =

Studio album by Straight No Chaser
- Released: April 13, 2010 (US); February 28, 2011 (UK)
- Recorded: 2009–2010
- Genre: Pop rock
- Length: 40:37
- Label: Atco Records, Atlantic Records

Straight No Chaser chronology
Christmas Cheers (2009)	With a Twist (2010)	Under the Influence (2013)

With a Twist is the third studio album by American men's singing group, Straight No Chaser. It was released in the US on April 13, 2010 and on February 28, 2011 in the UK. It has peaked to number 29 on the U.S. Billboard 200.

== Track listing ==
No.	Title	Length
1.	"I'm Yours/Somewhere Over the Rainbow"	3:33
2.	"Tainted Love"	2:56
3.	"Don't Dream It's Over"	3:17
4.	"Fix You"	4:06
5.	"You're My Best Friend"	2:11
6.	"The Living Years"	4:07
7.	"You & Me & the Bottle Makes Three/Single Ladies"	2:40
8.	"Wonderwall"	2:52
9.	"Joy to the World"	2:25
10.	"Under the Bridge"	3:12
11.	"Can't Take My Eyes Off of You"	3:25
12.	"One Voice" (feat. Barry Manilow)	2:31
13.	"Only You"	3:22

== Chart performance ==
Chart (2010)	Peak position
U.S. Billboard 200	29

== Release history ==
Region	Release date	Label
United States	April 13, 2010	Atlantic Records
United Kingdom	February 28, 2011	Atlantic Records
