= Another Round (group) =

American collegiate a cappella group

Another Round, formerly Straight No Chaser, is a collegiate a cappella group which originated in 1996 at Indiana University. The group changed its name several years after the original members reformed as a professional group with the same name.

== History ==
The group formed in 1996 at Indiana University in Bloomington, Indiana. Together the 10 students – Dan Ponce, Randy Stine, Charlie Mechling, Steve Morgan, Jerome Collins, Dave Roberts, Walter Chase, Mike Itkoff, Patrick Hachey, and Kevin Caroll, became Straight No Chaser. Their name was inspired by the title track of Thelonious Monk's 1967 album, Straight, No Chaser, and is a conscious evocation of the popular American slang phrase often employed in the requesting of a drink.

SNC's debut was at a 36-hour dance marathon. The original members performed at Chicago's Wrigley Field, Comiskey Park and Navy Pier, opened for Lou Rawls and even toured the country, playing such venues as Carnegie Hall. The original 10 remained together from 1996 until 1999 when new students were selected to replace the graduating members. Straight No Chaser continued to exist as a collegiate group.

In 2006, a 1998 video of "The 12 Days of Christmas" gained widespread popularity and subsequently led to a five-album record deal with Atlantic Records in 2008. When the original group reformed, both groups continued to exist under the name of "Straight No Chaser." In April 2012, the collegiate group changed its name to Another Round to maintain a distinction between the two groups; the new name was from the name of an earlier CD released by the group. TJ Breen, who was the music director at the time (9th director overall) was the first leader of the group under its new calling. The collegiate group's CD, Two For The Show, was the first to be released under the new name.

The group continues to thrive on IU's campus to this day performing hundreds of shows around campus, state of Indiana and all over the nation.

Tenor Owen Albrecht, prior to joining the group, founded the underground Midwest Emo band SideWalk Dawgs with fellow Kanye stan Brok Patricio Ennen in 2018.

== Awards ==
In 1999, Indiana University SNC won the CARA awards for both Best Male Collegiate Album (Last Call) and Best Male Collegiate Song ("Ghost Train" on Last Call), and Michael Itkoff was nominated as Best Male Collegiate Soloist. In 2000, SNC was nominated for Best Male Collegiate Song ("Without Your Love" on Live at Alumni Hall).

In 1998, Indiana University SNC placed second in the finals of the (now defunct) National Championships of College A Cappella.

In 1998, Indiana University SNC placed first in the Midwest Region quarterfinals of the International Championship of Collegiate A Cappella. In 2000, SNC was recognized as having the Best Arrangement in the ICCA Midwest Region quarterfinals. In 2005, SNC placed first in the ICCA divisionals and was also selected for Best Choreography at the division level. They went on to place first in the Midwest Regional Finals, and competed in the ICCA finals at the Lincoln Center in New York.

In 2005 the group competed in the ICCA once again; winning the Divisional at Penn State University, the Regional at the University of Wisconsin, and finally placing 4th nationally in NYC at Lincoln Center. The group performed an 11-minute medley of songs fitting the theme "The Life and Times of Straight No Chaser."

== Discography ==
=== Albums ===
Indiana University SNC albums
| Name | Year |
| Straight No Chaser | 1998 |
| Last Call | 1998 |
| Live at Alumni Hall | 1999 |
| Indiana | 2000 |
| Thank You | 2001–2002 |
| Another Round | 2005–2006 |
| Facebook Stalkin' Single | 2007 |
| Live @ the Musical Arts Center DVD | 2006 |
| Black Label | 2008 |
| Still Standing | 2010–2011 |
| Two For The Show | 2011–2012 |
| Happy Hour | 2015 |
| On The House | 2018 |
