= Straight No Chaser (group) =

American a cappella group

- Origin: Indiana, United States
- Genre: A cappella
- Years active: 1996–2000; 2008–present
- Label: Atlantic Records
- Members: Walter Chase; Jerome Collins; Seggie Isho; Michael Luginbill; Steve Morgan; Luke Bob Robinson; Jasper Smith; Tyler Trepp; Freedom Young
- Past members: Mike Itkoff; Dan Ponce; Ryan Ahlwardt; Don Nottingham; David Roberts; Charlie Mechling; Randy Stine
- Website: sncmusic.com

Straight No Chaser (SNC) is a professional American a cappella group that originated in 1996 at Indiana University. Originally a student group at the university, they recorded a video in 1998 of a comical version of "The 12 Days of Christmas". The founding members all graduated, to be replaced by other students, in 1999. In 2007, the 1998 video went viral on YouTube, and subsequently led to a reunion of the founding members and a five-album record deal with Atlantic Records in 2008. The YouTube video has been viewed more than 26 million times.

The group continues as a student-run a cappella group at Indiana University (until 2012 under the same name, and since 2012 under a new name, Another Round). All members of the professional group have been members of the student group prior to joining.

== History ==
The group formed in 1996 at Indiana University in Bloomington, Indiana. Dan Ponce, Randy Stine, Charlie Mechling, Steve Morgan, Jerome Collins, Dave Roberts, Walter Chase, Mike Itkoff, Kevin Caroll and Patrick Hachey became Straight No Chaser. Their name was inspired by the title track of Thelonious Monk's 1967 album, Straight, No Chaser, and is a conscious evocation of the popular American slang phrase often employed in requesting a drink.

SNC's debut was at a 36-hour dance marathon. The original members performed at Chicago's Wrigley Field, Comiskey Park and Navy Pier, opened for Lou Rawls and even toured the country, playing such venues as Carnegie Hall. The original ten remained together from 1996 until 1999, when new students were selected to replace the graduating members. Straight No Chaser continued to exist as a collegiate group.

When the original group reformed, both groups continued to exist under the name Straight No Chaser. In April 2012, the collegiate group changed its name to Another Round, taken from the name of an earlier CD that was released by the group.

== Viral video and reunion of founding members ==
In April 2006, a video recording of the group's performance of "The 12 Days of Christmas", filmed on December 7, 1998, at the Musical Arts Center in Bloomington, Indiana, was posted on YouTube by founding member Randy Stine. The song was an adaptation of a 1968 comic arrangement of the song by Richard C. Gregory, a faculty member of The Williston Northampton School, for his a cappella group, the Williston Caterwaulers. SNC added their own touches, including songs like "I Have a Little Dreidel" and Toto's "Africa". It has received over 26 million views. After viewing the video himself, Craig Kallman, CEO of Atlantic Records, called Randy Stine, who posted the video, and asked if the group would consider reuniting to record a new album.

In July 2008, eight original SNC members—Dan Ponce, Randy Stine, Charlie Mechling, Steve Morgan, Jerome Collins, Dave Roberts, Walter Chase, and Mike Itkoff, along with 2000–03 SNC members Mike Luginbill and Ryan Ahlwardt—recorded a Christmas album, Holiday Spirits, in Bloomington, Indiana. After appearances on TNT's Christmas in Washington, Fox's Fox & Friends, and NBC's Today on December 22, 2008, Holiday Spirits became the #1 selling album on both the iTunes and Amazon.com charts.

== Lineup changes, recordings, and tours ==
On August 18, 2009, SNC announced that Michael Itkoff and Steve Morgan had decided to step down from the group to spend more time with their families. SNC replaced them with Seggie Isho, originally from Rochester Hills, Michigan, and Tyler Trepp, originally from Urbandale, Iowa. Both Isho and Trepp were members of the collegiate SNC group at Indiana University: Isho 2003–05, and Trepp 2003–07.

SNC taped a live concert special in New York City during the summer of 2009 that was aired nationally for several years on PBS stations during their pledge drives as a Christmas special, and again in the spring and summer, excluding the Christmas songs but including six not-seen-before pop songs.

On August 31, 2009, Straight No Chaser released an EP of six songs, titled Six Pack, continuing the band's tradition of album titles that engage the symbolism of bar-tending themes. On November 3, 2009, they released their second Christmas album, Christmas Cheers co-produced with Deke Sharon, and they released their first non-Christmas album, With a Twist, in April 2010. The album includes a song featuring Barry Manilow. In April 2010, the group performed a TV theme song medley on Late Night with Jimmy Fallon. In mid-2010, the group performed 40 shows at Harrah's Resort and Casino in Atlantic City, New Jersey. Don Nottingham replaced Dan Ponce in September 2010 when Dan decided to return to television journalism in Chicago. Their 2010 fall tour was a 75-city tour of the United States, Canada, and the UK and featured their box-set titled All I Want For Christmas, which featured their two holiday albums and a DVD of their PBS special, Live in New York.

In 2011, Straight No Chaser took a break from their extensive touring to return to Harrah's Casino in Atlantic City for a 52-show summer residency with a show, Back to the Shore: Songs Through the Decades and More. In October 2011, Straight No Chaser released a follow-up to the Six Pack EP with Six Pack Vol. II. In December 2012, Ryan Ahlwardt left the group and Steve Morgan rejoined the group the following month.

In May 2013, the group released its fourth album on Atlantic Records entitled Under the Influence. The deluxe version of the album is 17 tracks, eight of which feature guest artists Sara Bareilles, Phil Collins, Elton John, Jason Mraz, Dolly Parton, Seal, Rob Thomas, and Stevie Wonder. The group released a holiday EP in 2013, titled Under the Influence: Holiday Edition including "Wonderful Christmastime", a track with Paul McCartney. The group released a new Christmas track in 2014 entitled "Text Me Merry Christmas" featuring singer-actress Kristen Bell.

The group sang "Back Home Again in Indiana" for the 99th running of the Indianapolis 500. In October 2015, the group released the album The New Old Fashioned. A year later, in October 2016, the group released I'll Have Another... Christmas Album. In May 2017, Don Nottingham left the group to spend more time with his family.

In November 2018, the group released One Shot. The album tells the group's story from 1996 to 2018 through song. It includes interludes between tracks explaining and reminiscing about highlights in group history.

Dave Roberts left the group and was replaced by Jasper Smith shortly before the start of the COVID-19 pandemic in early 2020. The group released Social Christmasing in November of that year. In fall of 2021, they embarked on a three-month tour through January 2022, and a second spring tour was also scheduled for March–April 2022.

In June 2022 original member Charlie Mechling left the group to be home with his family. The group replaced him with musician and vocal percussionist Freedom Young.

In March 2024, the group also saw the addition of Luke Bob Robinson, replacing founding member Randy Stine as bass.

== Members ==
=== Current members ===
- Jerome Collins – tenor (1996–1999, 2008–present)
- Walter Chase – tenor (1996–1999, 2008–present)
- Steve Morgan – baritone (1996–1999, 2008–2009, 2012–present)
- Mike Luginbill – tenor (2000, 2008–present)
- Seggie Isho – baritone (2009–present)
- Tyler Trepp – tenor / vocal percussionist (2009–present)
- Jasper Smith – baritone / tenor (2020–present)
- Freedom Young – vocal percussionist / baritone (2022–present)
- Luke Bob Robinson – bass (2024–present)

=== Former members ===
- Mike Itkoff – baritone (1996–1999, 2008–2009)
- Dan Ponce – baritone (1996–1999, 2008–2010)
- Ryan Ahlwardt – tenor (2000, 2008–2012)
- Don Nottingham – baritone (2010–2017)
- David "Dave" Roberts – baritone (1996–1999, 2008–2019)
- Charlie Mechling – bass (1996–1999, 2008–2022)
- Randy Stine – bass (1996–1999, 2008–2024)

== Awards ==
In 2009, Atlantic Records SNC won the Contemporary A cappella Recording Award for Best Holiday Album (Holiday Spirits) and was nominated for Best Holiday Song ("Carol Of The Bells" on Holiday Spirits).

== Discography ==
=== Albums ===
Title	Album details	Chart positions
Title	Album details	US
Holiday Spirits	Released: October 28, 2008; Label: Atlantic	46
Christmas Cheers	Released: November 3, 2009; Label: Atlantic	38
With a Twist	Released: April 13, 2010; Label: Atlantic	29
Under the Influence	Released: May 7, 2013; Label: Atlantic	28
The New Old Fashioned	Released: October 30, 2015; Label: Atlantic	64
I'll Have Another... Christmas Album	Released: October 28, 2016; Label: Atlantic	47
One Shot	Released: November 2, 2018; Label: Atlantic	—N/a
Social Christmasing	Released: November 6, 2020; Label: SNC Records	—N/a
The 25th Anniversary Celebration (Live)	Released: January 13, 2023; Label: SNC Records	—N/a
Yacht on the Rocks	Released: June 23, 2023; Label: SNC Records	—N/a
Holiday Road	Released: October 24, 2025; Label: SNC Records	—N/a

=== EPs ===
Title	Extended play details	Chart positions
Title	Extended play details	US
Six Pack	Released: June 29, 2009; Label: Atlantic	193
Six Pack: Volume 2	Released: November 28, 2011; Label: Atlantic	—N/a
Under the Influence: Holiday Edition	Released: October 29, 2013; Reissued: November 18, 2014; Label: Atlantic	33
Six Pack: Volume 3	Released: July 21, 2017; Label: Atlantic	—N/a
Open Bar	Released: November 15, 2019; Label: SNC Records	—N/a
Stocking Stuffer	Released: November 3, 2023; Label: SNC Records	—N/a
90s Proof	Released: July 19, 2024; Label: SNC Records	—N/a

=== Non-album singles and bonus tracks ===
Title	Released	Album
America the Beautiful	June 29, 2010	Single
Let It Go	April 4, 2014	Single
Text Me Merry Christmas (featuring Kristen Bell)	November 17, 2014	Under The Influence: Holiday Edition (Re-release)
(Back Home Again In) Indiana	May 22, 2015	Single
Rockin' Around the Christmas Tree / Winter Wonderland	December 4, 2015	Single
That's Why We Celebrate	November 26, 2018	Holiday Spirits – 10th Anniversary Edition
The 12 Days of Christmas (2018 Remix) [Live]	November 26, 2018	Holiday Spirits – 10th Anniversary Edition
Someone You Loved	October 4, 2019	Single
You Get What You Give	March 12, 2021	Single
Leave The Door Open	May 14, 2021	Single
Christmas Like	December 3, 2021	Single
As It Was	November 11, 2022	Single
Christmas Night With You	November 18, 2022	Single
Goodbye Yellow Brick Road	September 20, 2024	Single
