= Born with a Broken Heart =

2024 single by Damiano David

Single by Damiano David

from the album Funny Little Fears
- Released: 25 October 2024
- Length: 3:28
- Label: Sony Italy; Arista
- Songwriters: Damiano David; Jason Evigan; Mark Schick; Sarah Hudson
- Producers: Jason Evigan; Mark Schick

Damiano David singles chronology
"Silverlines" (2024)	"Born with a Broken Heart" (2024)	"Next Summer" (2025)

Music video
- "Born with a Broken Heart" on YouTube

"Born with a Broken Heart" is a song by Italian singer Damiano David. It was released through Sony Music Italy and Arista Records on 25 October 2024, as the second single from David's debut studio album, Funny Little Fears (2025). He wrote the song along with Sarah Hudson and its producers Jason Evigan and Mark Schick. An Aerin Moreno-directed music video premiered alongside the single.

== Background and release ==
Måneskin's lead vocalist Damiano David started his solo musical career with the release of "Silverlines" on 27 September 2024, a Labrinth-produced single. It served as the lead single from his debut studio album, released in 2025. The second single, "Born with a Broken Heart", was released in the following month, on 25 October.

== Composition ==
In a statement while releasing the song, David said: "When I wrote this song I was getting out of a very dark place, I was feeling emotionless [...] I think the song was a way to make myself make sense of what I was feeling and look at it from a less scary perspective". Containing dramatic vocals and an anthemic production, the lyrics of the song explore emotional numbness and fear during a relationship.

== Music video ==
An accompanying music video for "Born with a Broken Heart" premiered on the same date at 12pm British Summer Time. About the video, David said: "[It] is my personal fantasy. A world where no matter what, once you step through the door, everything becomes magical and beautiful". The video pays homage to Old Hollywood style films of the golden age of cinema and features Damiano performing choreography inspired by Fred Astaire and Ginger Rogers, Gene Kelly and the Zigfeild Follies with dancer Lexee Smith and a group of dancers in showgirl style costumes.

== Live performances ==
Alongside "Silverlines", David performed an unaired rendition of "Born with a Broken Heart" on The Tonight Show Starring Jimmy Fallon, which was later released online on 28 October. On the same date, he performed the track as part of his first one-off concert at (Le) Poisson Rouge in New York City. He also sang it for SiriusXM, alongside a cover of "Die with a Smile" by Lady Gaga and Bruno Mars.

== Charts ==
=== Weekly charts ===
Weekly chart performance for "Born with a Broken Heart"
Chart (2024–2025)	Peak position
Belgium (Ultratop 50 Flanders)	4
Belgium (Ultratop 50 Wallonia)	3
Canada (Canadian Hot 100)	95
Canada CHR/Top 40 (Billboard)	17
Canada Hot AC (Billboard)	28
Chile Anglo Airplay (Monitor Latino)	6
CIS Airplay (TopHit)	59
Croatia International Airplay (Top lista)	6
Czech Republic Airplay (ČNS IFPI)	1
Denmark Airplay (Tracklisten)	14
Estonia Airplay (TopHit)	7
Finland Airplay (Radiosoittolista)	2
France (SNEP)	21
Greece International (IFPI)	44
Hungary (Editors' Choice Top 40)	20
Iceland (Tónlistinn)	33
Israel International Airplay (Media Forest)	15
Italy (FIMI)	24
Japan Hot Overseas (Billboard Japan)	2
Kazakhstan Airplay (TopHit)	90
Lithuania Airplay (TopHit)	16
Netherlands (Dutch Top 40)	10
Netherlands (Single Top 100)	69
Poland (Polish Airplay Top 100)	2
Poland (Polish Streaming Top 100)	89
Portugal (AFP)	99
Romania Airplay (TopHit)	97
San Marino Airplay (SMRTV Top 50)	1
Spain Airplay (Promusicae)	3
Switzerland (Schweizer Hitparade)	54
UK Singles Downloads (Official Charts)	94
US Adult Pop Airplay (Billboard)	14
US Hot Rock & Alternative Songs (Billboard)	18
US Pop Airplay (Billboard)	18

=== Monthly charts ===
Monthly chart performance for "Born with a Broken Heart"
Chart (2024–2025)	Peak position
CIS Airplay (TopHit)	65
Czech Republic (Rádio Top 100)	47
Estonia Airplay (TopHit)	5
Lithuania Airplay (TopHit)	19

=== Year-end charts ===
Year-end chart performance for "Born with a Broken Heart"
Chart (2025)	Position
Belgium (Ultratop 50 Flanders)	18
Belgium (Ultratop 50 Wallonia)	22
Canada CHR/Top 40 (Billboard)	65
Canada Hot AC (Billboard)	77
CIS Airplay (TopHit)	167
Estonia Airplay (TopHit)	23
France (SNEP)	84
Iceland (Tónlistinn)	100
Italy (FIMI)	72
Lithuania Airplay (TopHit)	42
Netherlands (Dutch Top 40)	17
Poland (Polish Airplay Top 100)	27
US Hot Rock & Alternative Songs (Billboard)	77

== Certifications ==
Certifications for "Born with a Broken Heart"
Region	Certification	Certified units/sales
Belgium (BRMA)	Platinum	40,000^{‡}
France (SNEP)	Diamond	333,333^{‡}
Hungary (MAHASZ)	Gold	2,000^{‡}
Italy (FIMI)	Platinum	200,000^{‡}
Netherlands (NVPI)	Gold	46,500^{‡}
Poland (ZPAV)	Gold	62,500^{‡}
Portugal (AFP)	Platinum	25,000^{‡}
Spain (Promusicae)	Gold	50,000^{‡}
Switzerland (IFPI Switzerland)	Gold	15,000^{‡}
^{‡} Sales+streaming figures based on certification alone.

== Release history ==
"Born with a Broken Heart" release history
Region	Date	Format(s)	Label	Ref.
Various	October 25, 2024	Digital download; streaming	Sony Italy; Arista	
United States	October 25, 2024	Contemporary hit radio	Arista	
Italy	October 25, 2024	Radio airplay	Sony Italy	
