= Silverlines =

2024 single by Damiano David

Single by Damiano David

from the album Funny Little Fears
- Released: 27 September 2024
- Length: 3:17
- Label: Sony Italy; Arista
- Songwriters: Damiano David; Ferras Alqaisi; Labrinth; Sarah Hudson
- Producer: Labrinth

Damiano David singles chronology
"Silverlines" (2024)	"Born with a Broken Heart" (2024)

Music video
- "Silverlines" on YouTube

"Silverlines" is the debut solo single by Italian singer Damiano David. It was released on 27 September 2024, through Sony Music Italy and Arista Records, as the lead single from his debut studio album, Funny Little Fears (2025). David wrote the song along with Ferras Alqaisi, Sarah Hudson, and its producer Labrinth. A piano ballad ending with crescendos containing drums and choirs, it was marketed as a departure from his work with Italian rock band Måneskin, to express a more personal side of himself.

An accompanying music video directed by the duo Nono + Rodrigo premiered alongside the song. An orchestral version was released on 8 October 2024 to the singer's official YouTube channel. David sang "Silverlines" at televised performances on Che tempo che fa and The Tonight Show Starring Jimmy Fallon.

== Background ==
Damiano David, the frontman and lead vocalist of the Italian rock band Måneskin, started working on his first solo project while being on tour with the band promoting their album Rush! (2023). In September 2024, David started teasing his solo project on social media. The singer posted on Instagram a video of him entering a limousine, in which the driver asks him where he wants to go, and David answers "Everywhere", the same word that he used to caption the post. The video ends with the date "Sept. 27" flashing on the screen. At the 2024 MTV Video Music Awards red carpet, David said to the Associated Press: "I've been working for a long, long time on a new project and September 27 is the date of release so I would love everyone to stay tuned". He released a monologue to Spotify called "My name is Damiano David". "Silverlines" was announced via David's social media accounts on 18 September 2024, two days after teasing the participation of English singer and producer Labrinth on it. Pre-saves for the song were made available on the same date. Later, the production of Labrinth on the track was confirmed.

== Release ==
Sony Music Italy and Arista Records released "Silverlines" on 27 September 2024 via streaming services. An orchestral version of the song was released on 8 October 2024 to the singer's YouTube channel; it finds David's voice surrounded by string instruments.

== Composition ==
American singer-songwriter Sarah Hudson was the first to work on "Silverlines"; she later connected Labrinth, David, and Ferras to shape the song. "Silverlines" was one of the first songs composed for David's debut studio album. It was labeled as a departure from David's work with Måneskin, expressing a more personal side of himself. He explained that the reason why he had not yet shared this side of him in the band was because he wanted to respect the band's strong identity. When asked by NME, he stated that he chose "Silverlines" to start his solo musical career because it is "pretty unique compared to other songs on the record".

It is a ballad led by a piano arrangement. The song ends with a series of crescendos, containing drums and choirs. It was described by NME's Andrew Trendell as bold and theatrical. Gabriel Cárcoba for Jenesaispop compared its effect to Harry Styles's "Sign of the Times", released in 2017. About the lyrics of the song, David explained: "It's quite literal, it's about the rays of hope, about finding the positive side of things and finding what really makes us who we are". In an interview with the Spanish edition of Rolling Stone, the singer explained that he wanted to show a more "human and vulnerable" part of himself. He also expressed his admiration for Labrinth and that it was "a big dream" to work with him.

== Music video ==
The music video for "Silverlines" was directed by the duo Nono + Rodrigo. It depicts David exploring picturesque places. The video ends with David entering a limousine, in which the driver asks him where he wants to go, answering "Everywhere"; this part was previously used for the pre-release promotion of the track.

== Live performances ==
On 6 October 2024, David performed "Silverlines" for the first time in a televised performance on Che tempo che fa. On 22 October, he made his solo debut on an American late-night talk show on The Tonight Show Starring Jimmy Fallon, where he also performed "Silverlines". David then sang it as part of his first solo one-off concert in New York City's (Le) Poisson Rouge, alongside "Born with a Broken Heart" and three unreleased songs.

== Charts ==
Chart performance for "Silverlines"
Chart (2024)	Peak position
Italy (FIMI)	85
San Marino Airplay (SMRTV Top 50)	26
UK Physical Singles (OCC)	18
