= Eurovision Song Contest winners discography =

The discography of the Eurovision Song Contest winners includes all the winning singles of the annual competition held since 1956. As of 2025, 72 songs have won the competition, including four entries which were declared joint winners in 1969.

== 1956–1969 ==
Year	Single	Artist	Label	Peak chart positions									Album
Year	Single	Artist	Label	AUT	BEL (FL)	FRA	GER	IRE	NLD	NOR	SWI	UK	Album
1956	"Refrain"	Lys Assia	Decca	—N/a	—	—	—N/a	—N/a	—N/a	—N/a	—N/a	—	Non-album singles
1957	"Net als toen"	Corry Brokken	Ronnex	—N/a	13	—	—N/a	—N/a	8	—N/a	—N/a	—	Non-album singles
1958	"Dors, mon amour"	André Claveau	Pathé	—N/a	—	—	—N/a	—N/a	—	—N/a	—N/a	—	Non-album singles
1959	"Een beetje"	Teddy Scholten	Philips	—N/a	12	—	—	—N/a	3	—	—N/a	—	Non-album singles
1960	"Tom Pillibi"	Jacqueline Boyer	Columbia	—N/a	4	2	21	—N/a	14	—	—N/a	33	Jacquline Boyer
1961	"Nous les amoureux"	Jean-Claude Pascal	His Master's Voice	—N/a	—	6	—	—N/a	—	—	—N/a	—	Non-album single
1962	"Un premier amour"	Isabelle Aubret	Philips	—N/a	—	14	—	—N/a	—	—	—N/a	—	Un premier amour
1963	"Dansevise"	Grethe and Jørgen Ingmann	Philips	—N/a	—	—	49	—	—	7	—N/a	—	Non-album single
1964	"Non ho l'età"	Gigliola Cinquetti	Festival	—N/a	1	1	3	—	2	3	—N/a	17	Gigliola Cinquetti
1965	"Poupée de cire, poupée de son"	France Gall	Philips	10	4	—	2	—	6	1	—N/a	—	Poupée de cire, poupée de son
1966	"Merci, Chérie"	Udo Jürgens	Vogue	2	2	11	4	—	19	—	—N/a	—	Françoise & Udo
1967	"Puppet on a String"	Sandie Shaw	Pye	1	1	2	1	1	1	1	—N/a	1	Puppet on a String
1968	"La, la, la"	Massiel	Noxia	8	—	—	12	—	18	5	8	35	Non-album singles
1969	"Boom Bang-a-Bang"	Lulu	Columbia	10	4	41	8	1	19	1	3	2	Non-album singles
1969	"Un jour, un enfant"	Frida Boccara	Philips	—	—	35	—	—	—	—	—	—	Un jour, un enfant
1969	"De troubadour"	Lenny Kuhr	Philips	—	—	—	—	—	18	—	—	—	De troubadour
1969	"Vivo cantando"	Salomé	Belter	—	—	—	—	—	—	—	—	—	Vivo cantando
"—" denotes a recording that did not chart or was not released in that territory.

== 1970–1979 ==
Year	Single	Artist	Label	Peak chart positions										Certifications	Album
Year	Single	Artist	Label	AUT	BEL (FL)	GER	IRE	NLD	NOR	SWE	SWI	UK	US	Certifications	Album
1970	"All Kinds of Everything"	Dana	Decca	7	1	4	1	2	—	—N/a	3	1	—		All Kinds of Everything
1971	"Un banc, un arbre, une rue"	Séverine	Philips	—	3	23	3	13	2	—N/a	5	9	—		Séverine
1972	"Après toi"	Vicky Leandros	Philips	—	1	11	2	1	2	—N/a	1	2	—		Après Toi
1973	"Tu te reconnaîtras"	Anne Marie David	Epic	—	6	40	3	2	2	—N/a	6	13	—		Non-album single
1974	"Waterloo"	ABBA	Polar	2	1	1	1	1	1	—N/a	1	1	6		Waterloo
1975	"Ding-A-Dong"	Teach-In	CNR	—	2	9	8	3	1	—	1	13	—		Festival
1976	"Save Your Kisses for Me"	Brotherhood of Man	Pye	3	1	2	1	1	1	6	2	1	27	FRA: Gold; UK: Platinum	Love and Kisses
1977	"L'oiseau et l'enfant"	Marie Myriam	Polydor	15	6	19	—	23	—	5	2	42	—	FRA: Gold	Marie Myriam
1978	"A-Ba-Ni-Bi"	Izhar Cohen and the Alphabeta	Polydor	21	6	22	—	17	—	9	4	20	—		Make a Little Love
1979	"Hallelujah"	Milk and Honey	Polydor	15	4	11	1	6	1	1	2	5	—		Non-album single
"—" denotes a recording that did not chart or was not released in that territory.

== 1980–1989 ==
Year	Single	Artist	Label	Peak chart positions										Certifications	Album
Year	Single	Artist	Label	AUT	BEL (FL)	FRA	GER	IRE	NLD	NOR	SWE	SWI	UK	Certifications	Album
1980	"What's Another Year"	Johnny Logan	Epic	5	1	—	2	1	6	1	1	2	1	UK: Silver	What's Another Year
1981	"Making Your Mind Up"	Bucks Fizz	RCA	1	1	—	5	1	1	2	2	3	1	UK: Gold	Bucks Fizz
1982	"Ein bißchen Frieden"	Nicole	Jupiter	1	1	—	1	1	1	1	1	1	1	GER: Gold; NLD: Gold; UK: Silver	Ein bißchen Frieden / A Little Peace
1983	"Si la vie est cadeau"	Corinne Hermès	Polydor	—	3	—	67	19	31	—	13	14	89		Non-album single
1984	"Diggi-Loo Diggi-Ley"	Herreys	Mariann	11	3	—	18	13	4	5	2	10	46		Diggi-Loo Diggi-Ley
1985	"La det swinge"	Bobbysocks!	Bahama	14	1	—	47	8	9	1	4	30	44		Bobbysocks!
1986	"J'aime la vie"	Sandra Kim	Carrere	6	1	21	50	—	2	—	15	29	—		J'aime la vie
1987	"Hold Me Now"	Johnny Logan	Epic	4	1	—	2	1	3	2	2	6	2	UK: Silver	Hold Me Now
1988	"Ne partez pas sans moi"	Celine Dion	Carrere	—	12	36	—	—	42	—	—	11	—		Incognito
1989	"Rock Me"	Riva	Koch Int.	—	16	—	—	—	56	—	—	—	—		Riva
"—" denotes a recording that did not chart or was not released in that territory.

== 1990–1999 ==
Year	Single	Artist	Label	Peak chart positions										Certifications	Album
Year	Single	Artist	Label	AUT	BEL (FL)	FRA	GER	IRE	NLD	NOR	SWE	SWI	UK	Certifications	Album
1990	"Insieme: 1992"	Toto Cutugno	EMI	3	8	—	13	—	15	—	—	2	—	FRA: Silver	Insieme: 1992
1991	"Fångad av en stormvind"	Carola	Virgin	22	15	—	—	—	65	6	3	—	—	SWE: Gold	Much More
1992	"Why Me?"	Linda Martin	Columbia	—	21	—	—	1	29	—	—	—	59		Non-album singles
1993	"In Your Eyes"	Niamh Kavanagh	Arista	—	—	—	83	1	42	—	—	—	24		Non-album singles
1994	"Rock 'n' Roll Kids"	Paul Harrington and Charlie McGettigan	CNR	—	42	—	—	2	30	—	—	—	83		Non-album singles
1995	"Nocturne"	Secret Garden	Philips	—	6	—	—	7	20	—	26	—	90		Songs from a Secret Garden
1996	"The Voice"	Eimear Quinn	CNR	—	9	—	—	3	21	—	31	—	40		Non-album single
1997	"Love Shine a Light"	Katrina and the Waves	Warner Music	2	6	—	62	5	6	2	5	26	3	NOR: Gold	Walk on Water
1998	"Diva"	Dana International	IMP	37	2	59	47	10	11	12	3	15	11	BEL: Gold	Diva - The Hits
1999	"Take Me to Your Heaven"	Charlotte Nilsson	Stockhous	—	5	—	—	—	23	10	2	—	20		Charlotte
"—" denotes a recording that did not chart or was not released in that territory.

== 2000–2009 ==
Year	Single	Artist	Label	Peak chart positions									Certifications	Album
Year	Single	Artist	Label	AUT	BEL (FL)	GER	IRE	NLD	NOR	SWE	SWI	UK	Certifications	Album
2000	"Fly on the Wings of Love"	Olsen Brothers	EMI	11	16	7	—	45	5	1	17	—	SWE: Platinum	Wings of Love
2001	"Everybody"	Tanel Padar, Dave Benton and 2XL	Universal	—	53	99	—	64	—	12	—	—		Non-album single
2002	"I Wanna"	Marie N	Baltic	—	65	—	—	—	—	—	—	—		On a Journey
2003	"Everyway That I Can"	Sertab Erener	Columbia, Sony	10	6	12	35	4	—	1	17	72	GRE: Platinum; SWE: Gold	No Boundaries
2004	"Wild Dances"	Ruslana	EMI	43	1	40	44	30	—	8	24	47	BEL: Gold	Wild Dances
2005	"My Number One"	Helena Paparizou	Sony BMG	44	10	37	—	24	—	1	15	—	GRE: Platinum; SWE: Gold	My Number One
2006	"Hard Rock Hallelujah"	Lordi	Drakkar	2	2	5	4	27	9	8	5	25	GER: Gold	The Arockalypse
2007	"Molitva"	Marija Šerifović	Connective	—	54	—	—	—	—	9	19	112		Molitva - The Best Of
2008	"Believe"	Dima Bilan	Universal Music	—	66	52	—	—	—	28	—	—		Protiv pravil
2009	"Fairytale"	Alexander Rybak	EMI	10	1	4	2	2	1	1	3	10	NOR: Gold; SWE: Platinum; UK: Silver	Fairytales
"—" denotes a recording that did not chart or was not released in that territory.

== 2010–2019 ==
Year	Single	Artist	Label	Peak chart positions										Certifications	Album
Year	Single	Artist	Label	AUT	BEL (FL)	GER	IRE	NLD	NOR	SWE	SWI	UK	US	Certifications	Album
2010	"Satellite"	Lena	Universal Music	2	4	1	2	5	1	1	1	30	—	GER: 2× Platinum; SWE: Gold; SWI: Platinum	My Cassette Player
2011	"Running Scared"	Ell and Nikki	EMI	22	37	33	41	59	—	—	11	61	—		Play with Me
2012	"Euphoria"	Loreen	Warner Music Sweden	1	1	1	1	2	1	1	1	3	—	AUT: Platinum; BEL: Gold; DEN: Platinum; FIN: Platinum; GER: 3× Gold; ITA: Gold; NOR: 11× Platinum; SPA: Platinum; SWE: 10× Platinum; SWI: Platinum; UK: Gold	Heal
2013	"Only Teardrops"	Emmelie de Forest	Sony Music Denmark	7	11	5	5	4	9	3	3	15	—	DEN: 2× Platinum; GER: Gold	Only Teardrops
2014	"Rise Like a Phoenix"	Conchita Wurst	ORF Enterprise	1	8	5	10	3	—	27	2	17	—	AUT: Platinum	Conchita
2015	"Heroes"	Måns Zelmerlöw	Warner Music Sweden	1	2	3	10	12	4	1	1	11	—	AUT: Gold; DEN: Gold; SWE: 5× Platinum; NOR: Gold; SPA: Gold	Perfectly Damaged
2016	"1944"	Jamala	Enjoy Records	54	28	—	—	116	—	46	73	—	—		1944
2017	"Amar pelos dois"	Salvador Sobral	Sons em Trânsito	22	30	43	—	35	—	33	6	97	—	POR: Gold	Non-album single
2018	"Toy"	Netta	Tedy Productions	15	29	19	63	60	19	5	34	49	—	BRA: 2× Platinum	Goody Bag
2019	"Arcade"	Duncan Laurence	Spark Records	22	2	26	23	1	10	6	6	29	30	BRA: 3× Diamond; FRA: Diamond; POL: Diamond; NLD: 4× Platinum; POR: 2× Platinum; AUS: Platinum; AUT: Platinum; BEL: Platinum; CAN: Platinum; DEN: Platinum; GER: Platinum; ITA: Platinum; MEX: Platinum; SPA: Platinum; UK: Platinum; US: Platinum; GRE: Gold; NOR: Gold; SWE: Gold	Worlds on Fire and Small Town Boy
"—" denotes a recording that did not chart or was not released in that territory.

== 2020–present ==
Year	Single	Artist	Label	Peak chart positions										Certifications	Album
Year	Single	Artist	Label	AUT	BEL (FL)	FRA	GER	IRE	NLD	NOR	SWE	SWI	UK	Certifications	Album
2020	Contest cancelled due to the COVID-19 pandemic														
2021	"Zitti e buoni"	Måneskin	Sony Music Italy	3	9	116	9	14	1	2	1	2	17	ITA: 5× Platinum; GRE: 2× Platinum; POL: 2× Platinum; SWE: 2× Platinum; AUT: Platinum; BEL: Platinum; BRA: Platinum; NOR: Platinum; SPA: Platinum; SWI: Platinum; FRA: Gold; GER: Gold; POR: Gold; UK: Silver	Teatro d'ira: Vol. I
2022	"Stefania"	Kalush Orchestra	Sony Music	26	24	—	22	30	36	19	7	11	38	POL: Gold	Non-album single
2023	"Tattoo"	Loreen	Universal	1	1	7	7	3	1	2	1	1	2	FRA: Diamond; POL: 4× Platinum; BEL: 2× Platinum; GRE: 2× Platinum; POR: 2× Platinum; DEN: Platinum; ITA: Platinum; SPA: Platinum; SWI: Gold; UK: Gold	Wildfire
2024	"The Code"	Nemo	Better Now, Universal	2	15	92	14	17	13	13	5	1	18	GRE: Gold	Arthouse
2025	"Wasted Love"	JJ	Manifester	1	28	—	13	53	36	27	8	3	53	AUT: Gold	Into the Unknown
2026	"Bangaranga"	Dara	K2ID	1	39	—	1	53	54	14	1	2	21		Non-album single
"—" denotes a recording that did not chart or was not released in that territory.

== See also ==
- List of Eurovision Song Contest winners
