= Arch Heath =

American film director and screenwriter

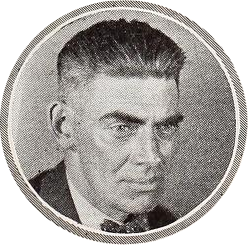
Arch Heath in 1927

Arch Heath (July 15, 1890 – January 7, 1945), also known as A. B. Heath and Arch B. Heath, was an American film director and screenwriter whose career spanned from the era of silent films to the 1940s. He helped pioneer the introduction of the sound film. Many of his early films are now considered lost.

== Career ==
Heath was born in Brooklyn. Before starting as a director, Heath played semi-pro baseball. He learned drawing as an office boy for a newspaper, and became a cartoonist for the sports page, finally succeeding Herbert Johnson at the Associated Newspapers Syndicate, signing his cartoons "Fields".

He started in movies by creating campaign films for the presidential campaign of Woodrow Wilson in 1914. From cartooning he also moved on to movie animation. He became general manager of production at Eastern Film Corporation, based in New York City. At Eastern he produced his first serial A Daughter of Uncle Sam, directed by James C. Morton, in 1918.

He moved to Pathé Studios in New York. He directed his first serial, The Masked Menace, in 1927. In 1930, when the studio moved to Hollywood, Heath was appointed "production manager of all two-reel comedies."

The Heath-directed 1928 film Melody of Love was "Universal's first 100 percent talkie feature," and "also may have been the first all-talking movie musical."

During World War II Heath produced films for the Signal Corps and the Office of War Information. He died at home in New York City on January 7, 1945. The Screen Writers Guild created the "Robert Meltzer Award" in honor of Heath, Meltzer and three others for "the writing of an American Film which, in addition to its value as entertainment, most effectively contributes to a better understanding or world problems."

== Filmography ==
=== Director ===
- Beyond the Great Wall, 1920, Eastern Productions, as A.B. Heath
- On Guard, 1927, Pathé, as Arch B. Heath (serial, 10 chapters)
- The Crimson Flash, 1927, Pathé, as Arch B. Heath (serial, 10 chapters)
- The Masked Menace, 1927, Pathé (serial, 10 chapters)
- Came the Dawn, 1928, Hal Roach Studios (with Leo McCarey)
- Mark of the Frog, 1928, Pathé, (serial, 10 chapters)
- That Night, 1928, Hal Roach Studios (with Leo McCarey)
- Melody of Love, 1928, Universal
- Modern Love, 1929, Universal (part-talkie)
- Chills and Fever, 1930, Pathé, as Arch B. Heath—writer and director
- Doctor's Orders, 1930, Hal Roach Studios
- Dangerous Youth, 1930, Pathé, as Arch B. Heath
- Against the Rules, 1931, RKO Pathé Pictures, as Arch B. Heath—writer and director

=== Writer ===
- The Scarlet West, 1925, First National Pictures, as A.B. Heath
- It Can Be Done, 1929, Universal, as A.B. Heath
- Ride 'em Cowboy, 1930, Pathé, as Arch B. Heath—writer and director
- Chills and Fever, 1930, Pathé, as Arch B. Heath—writer and director
- Hearts and Hoofs, 1930, Pathé, (short, as Arch B. Heath)
- Against the Rules, 1931, RKO Pathé Pictures, (short, as Arch B. Heath)
- The Adventures of Captain Marvel, 1941, Republic (serial, 12 chapters)
- White Eagle, 1941, Columbia (serial, 15 chapters)
- Against the Rules, 1931, RKO Pathé Pictures, (short, as Arch B. Heath)

=== Other ===
- Show Boat, 1929, Universal (sound supervision, prologue directed by Arch Heath)
