= Small Town Boy =

Small Town Boy may refer to:

- Small Town Boy (film), a 1937 American film directed by Glenn Tryon
- "Smalltown Boy", the 1984 debut single of the British synthpop group Bronski Beat
- Small Town Boy (album), a 2020 album by Dutch singer Duncan Lawrence
- "Small Town Boy" (song), a 2017 song by American country singer Dustin Lynch
