= Worlds on Fire (EP) =

EP by Duncan Laurence
- Released: 13 May 2020
- Label: Spark Records
- Producer: Bradley Richard Mair; Duncan Laurence; Lodewijk Martens; Will Knox; Oscar Holleman; Wouter Hardy; Bram Inscore; Brett McLaughlin; Tofer Brown

Duncan Laurence chronology
Worlds on Fire (2020)	Small Town Boy (2020)

Singles from Worlds on Fire
- 1. "Arcade" Released: 7 March 2019; 2. "Love Don't Hate It" Released: 23 October 2019; 3. "Someone Else" Released: 13 May 2020

Worlds on Fire is the debut EP by Dutch singer Duncan Laurence. It was released on 13 May 2020 by Spark Records. The EP includes the singles "Arcade", "Love Don't Hate It" and "Someone Else".

== Background ==
After the release of the EP, Laurence said on his Instagram account, "It’s here! My first EP ever. Please let me know in a comment what you think of the songs: which one’s your fav? Which one will you dance to? Sing along to? Cry to? Smile to? I wanna know EVERYTHING and all the feels."

== Singles ==
"Arcade" was released as the lead single from the EP on 7 March 2019. The song peaked at number one on the Dutch Singles Chart. The song represented the Netherlands at the Eurovision Song Contest 2019. It was performed during the second semi-final and qualified for the final and went on to win the competition. "Love Don't Hate It" was released as the second single from the EP on 23 October 2019. The song peaked at number forty-one on the Dutch Singles Chart. "Someone Else" was released as the third single from the EP on 13 May 2020. The song peaked at number seventy-two on the Dutch Singles Chart.

== Track listing ==
Credits adapted from Tidal.

No.	Title	Writer(s)	Producer(s)	Length
1.	"Beautiful"	Bradley Richard Mair; Duncan de Moor; Martin Konijnenburg; Tom Martin	Bradley Richard Mair; Duncan Laurence	4:17
2.	"Yet"	de Moor; Lodewijk Martens; Matthijs De Ronden; Will Knox	Duncan Laurence; Lodewijk Martens; Will Knox	3:01
3.	"Arcade"	de Moor; Joel Sjöö; Knox; Wouter Hardy	Oscar Holleman; Wouter Hardy	3:03
4.	"Someone Else"	Bram Inscore; Brett McLaughlin; de Moor; Jonny Price; PJ Harding	Bram Inscore; Brett McLaughlin	3:04
5.	"Love Don't Hate It"	de Moor; Michelle Buzz; Robert Gerongco; Sam Farrar; Samuel Gerongco	Tofer Brown	2:51

== Charts ==
Chart (2020)	Peak position
Dutch Albums (Album Top 100)	60

Chart (2021)	Peak position
US Heatseekers Albums (Billboard)	12
