= Skyboy (album) =

Studio album by Duncan Laurence
- Released: 22 September 2023
- Genre: Pop
- Length: 34:45
- Label: Yellowfield
- Producer: Leroy Clampitt; Jason Evigan; Wouter Hardy; Jakke Erixson; Sam de Jong; Paul Phamous; Alex Salibian; Ethan Schneiderman; Smile High

Duncan Laurence chronology
Small Town Boy (2020)	Skyboy (2023)

Singles from Skyboy
- 1. "Electric Life" Released: 3 August 2022; 2. "I Want It All" Released: 25 November 2022; 3. "Skyboy" Released: 8 March 2023; 4. "Rest In Peace" Released: 25 August 2023

Skyboy is the second studio album by Dutch singer Duncan Laurence. It was released on 22 September 2023 by Yellowfield Records and was preceded by the singles "Electric Life", "I Want It All", the title track, and "Rest In Peace".

== Background ==
In an interview with Numéro, Laurence explained the inspiration behind the album:

"I wanted to delve into a world where I could truly dream big. I was raised in South Holland, near Rotterdam, and the prevailing wisdom there was, ‘Be normal because you’re already crazy enough when you act normal.’ That’s the saying we lived by. So, I thought, ‘I don’t really buy into that notion.’ I just wanted to explore a world where I could authentically be myself and push the boundaries of that. Suddenly, I found myself in the world of Skyboy and Los Angeles. I need to mention that my husband, Jordan, and I got married just a month ago. We wrote everything together, and we found ourselves daydreaming about what that little boy, who grew up in a very conservative area in the States, and what I, growing up in an environment that constantly told me not to be ‘too much,’ would aspire to. What would he dream about? How would he evolve from being a ‘small-town boy’, which was the title of my first album, into a Skyboy? So, that’s the essence of the album—the journey of that boy who finally landed in Los Angeles and said, ‘You know what? Forget those opinions. Let’s create something that resonates with all my heart.’"

== Critical reception ==
Professional ratings
Review scores
Source	Rating
de Volkskrant	4/5 stars

Pablo Cabenda from Dutch daily morning newspaper de Volkskrant rated the album four out of five stars. He noted that "the power ballad clichés are now counterbalanced by gems of melody and (vocal) harmony." German music website Bleistiftrocker found that Skyboy "is characterized by clean and very fine songwriting. Choir elements are sprinkled in again and again, giving the sound a certain lightness."

== Track listing ==
Skyboy track listing
No.	Title	Writer(s)	Producer(s)	Length
1.	"Life on the Moon"	Duncan Laurence; Jordan Garfield; Wouter Hardy	Sam de Jong	2:56
2.	"Electric Life"	Laurence; Garfield; Leroy Clampitt; Paul Phamous	Clampitt; Phamous	3:14
3.	"Rest in Peace"	Laurence; Garfield; Brett McLaughlin; Jong; Eric Leva; Stephen Wrabel	Jong	2:55
4.	"Skyboy"	Laurence; Garfield; Hardy	Clampitt; Hardy	3:31
5.	"I Want It All"	Laurence; Garfield; Clampitt; Phamous	Clampitt; Phamous	3:12
6.	"California Rose"	Laurence; Garfoeld; McLaughlin; Jong	Jong	3:08
7.	"Lucid Dream"	Garfield	Jong	2:53
8.	"Baby Blues"	Laurence; Garfield; Alex Salibian; Ethan Schneiderman; Phamous	Phamous; Salibian; Schneiderman	2:39
9.	"Broken Parts"	Laurence; Garfield; Jakke Erixson; Fransisca Hall	Jakke	3:06
10.	"Anything"	Laurence; Garfield; McLaughlin; Jong	Jong	3:07
11.	"Biting My Tongue"	Laurence; Garfield; Mikky Ekko; Jason Evigan	Evigan; Smile High	3:59
Total length:				34:45

== Charts ==
Chart performance for Skyboy
Chart (2023)	Peak position
Dutch Albums (Album Top 100)	41

== Release history ==
Release history for Skyboy
Region	Date	Format	Label	Ref.
Various	22 September 2023	CD; LP; Digital download; streaming	Yellowfield	
