= Ladies in Distress =

1938 film by Gus Meins

- Theatrical release poster
- Directed by: Gus Meins
- Screenplay by: Dorrell McGowan; Stuart E. McGowan
- Story by: Dore Schary
- Produced by: Harry Grey
- Starring: Alison Skipworth; Polly Moran; Robert Livingston; Virginia Grey; Max Terhune; Berton Churchill
- Cinematography: Jack A. Marta
- Edited by: Ernest J. Nims
- Music by: Alberto Colombo
- Production company: Republic Pictures
- Distributed by: Republic Pictures
- Release date: June 13, 1938
- Running time: 66 minutes
- Country: United States
- Language: English

Ladies in Distress is a 1938 American drama film directed by Gus Meins and written by Dorrell McGowan and Stuart E. McGowan. The film stars Alison Skipworth, Polly Moran, Robert Livingston, Virginia Grey, Max Terhune and Berton Churchill. The film was released on June 13, 1938, by Republic Pictures.

== Cast ==
- Alison Skipworth as Josephine Bonney
- Polly Moran as Lydia Bonney
- Robert Livingston as Pete Braddock
- Virginia Grey as Sally
- Max Terhune as Dave Evans
- Berton Churchill as Fred Morgan
- Leonard Penn as Daniel J. Roman
- Horace McMahon as 2nd Thug
- Allen Vincent as Spade
- Eddie Acuff as Horace
- Charles Anthony Hughes as Lieutenant
- Jack Carr as Policeman
- Walter Sande as Duncan
- Billy Wayne as Brown
