= Obey the Law (1926 film) =

1926 film

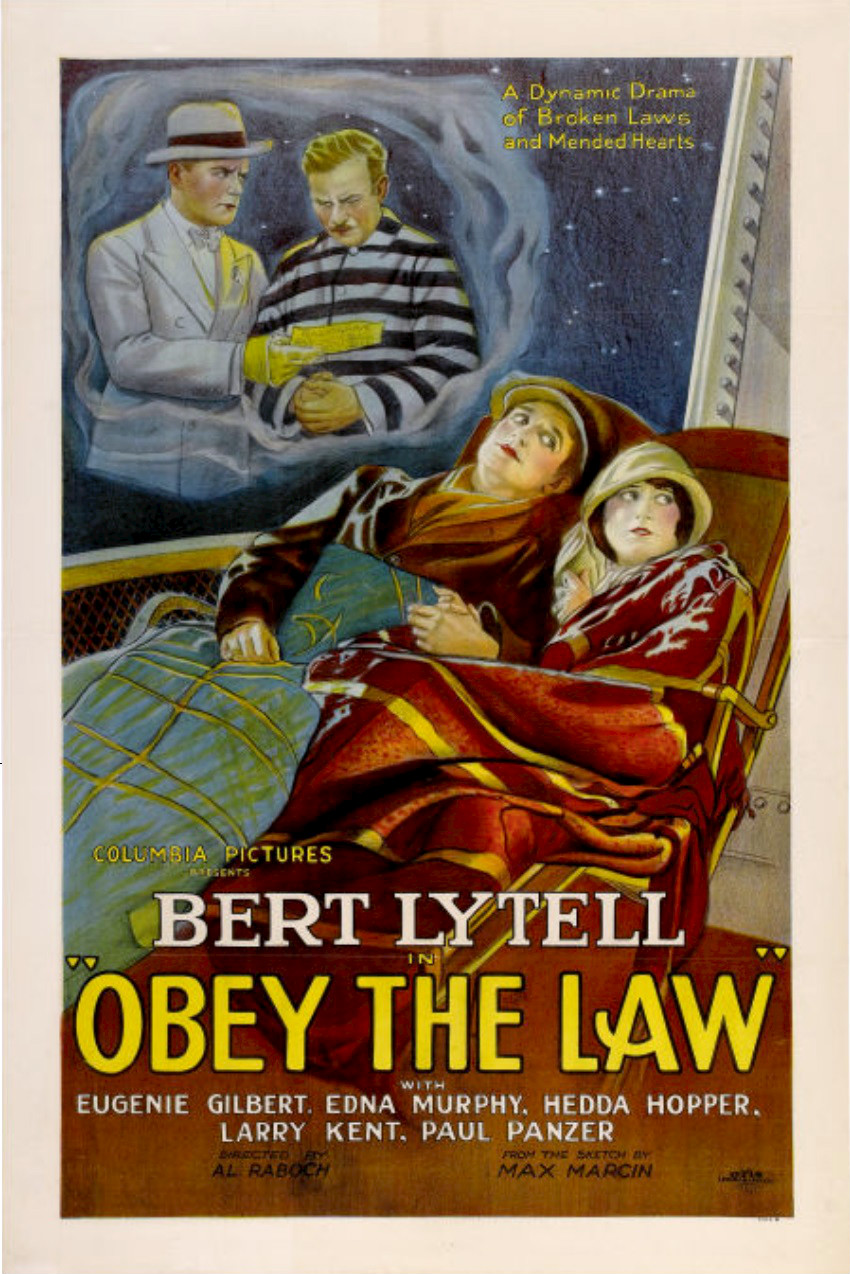
- Theatrical poster
- Directed by: Al Raboch
- Written by: Max Marcin (play); Al Raboch (adaptation)
- Produced by: Al Raboch; Harry Cohn
- Starring: Bert Lytell; Edna Murphy
- Cinematography: J.O. Taylor
- Distributed by: Columbia Pictures
- Release date: November 5, 1926
- Running time: 6 reels
- Country: United States
- Language: Silent (English intertitles)

Advertisement run in the Oakland Post-Enquirer to advertise showings of the film at the Grand Lake Theatre in Oakland, California

Obey the Law is a 1926 American silent film adventure-drama made by the Cohn brothers, Jack and Harry Cohn, and Al Raboch. The picture stars Bert Lytell and was released through the Cohns' fledgling company Columbia Pictures. The Library of Congress holds a print of this film.

== Cast ==
- Bert Lytell as Phil Schuyler
- Eugenia Gilbert as The Girl (billed Eugenie Gilbert)
- Edna Murphy as The Daughter
- Hedda Hopper as Society lady
- Larry Kent as The Friend
- Paul Panzer as The Crook
- Sarah Padden as The Mother
- William Welsh as The Father
