= Seas Beneath =

1931 film directed by John Ford

- Directed by: John Ford
- Written by: Dudley Nichols; William Collier Sr. Curt Furburg; James Parker Jr.
- Produced by: John Ford
- Starring: George O'Brien; Marion Lessing
- Cinematography: Joseph H. August
- Edited by: Frank E. Hull
- Music by: Peter Brunelli
- Production company: Fox Film Corporation
- Distributed by: Fox Film Corporation
- Release date: March 29, 1931
- Running time: 90 minutes
- Country: United States
- Language: English

Seas Beneath is a 1931 American Pre-Code action film directed and produced by John Ford and starring George O'Brien and Marion Lessing.

== Plot ==
In the book, John Ford by Peter Bogdanovich, Ford was interviewed about his memories of directing the film, and he had the following to say about the experience, expressing his annoyance at Lessing being hired as a leading actress:

That was a war story about a Q ship—some good stuff in it—but at the last moment, the head of the studio put a girl who'd never acted before in as the lead because he thought she spoke a few words of German—which she didn't. We had a scene, I remember, in which the German submarine slips up alongside another submarine to refuel, and this girl comes out onto the bridge chewing gum! Right in the camera. So we had to go to all the trouble of doing it all over again. She just couldn't act. But we did all the refueling at sea. That stuff was good and so was the battle stuff, but the story was bad; it was just a lot of hard work; and you couldn't do anything with that girl. Then later they cut the hell out of it.

== Cast ==
- George O'Brien as Cmdr. Robert "Bob" Kingsley
- Marion Lessing as Anna Marie Von Steuben
- Mona Maris as Fraulein Lolita
- Walter C. Kelly as Chief Mike "Guns" Costello
- Warren Hymer as "Lug" Kaufman
- Steve Pendleton as Ens. Richard "Dick" Cabot
- Nat Pendleton as 'Butch' Wagner (uncredited)
- Walter McGrail as Chief Joe Cobb
- Larry Kent as Lt. "Mac" McGregor
- Henry Victor as Baron Ernst von Steuben
- John Loder as Franz Shiller
- Maurice Murphy as Merkel (uncredited)
- Harry Tenbrook as Winkler (uncredited)
