= Feel Something (Armin van Buuren song) =

Single by Armin van Buuren featuring Duncan Laurence

from the album Small Town Boy and Euthymia
- Released: 6 November 2020
- Genre: Dance-pop
- Length: 3:04
- Label: Armada
- Songwriter(s): Armin van Buuren; Benno de Goeij; Duncan de Moor; Brett McLaughlin; Jordan Palmer; Sydney Cubit
- Producer(s): Armin van Buuren; Benno de Goeij

Armin van Buuren singles chronology
"Need You Now" (2020)	"Feel Something" (2020)	"Christmas Time" (2020)

Duncan Laurence singles chronology
"Last Night" (2020)	"Feel Something" (2020)	"Stars" (2021)

"Feel Something" is a song by Dutch DJ and record producer Armin van Buuren, featuring vocals from Dutch singer Duncan Laurence. It was released as a digital download on 6 November 2020 by Armada Music as the fifth single from Laurence's debut studio album Small Town Boy. The song also features on Armin van Buuren's EP Euthymia.

== Background ==
In an interview with Dutch radio station Qmusic, Laurence talked about how the collaboration with Van Buuren came about.

== Tom Staar Remix ==
- "Feel Something (Tom Staar Extended Remix)" (4:27)

== Personnel ==
Credits adapted from Tidal.

- Armin van Buuren – producer, composer
- Benno de Goeij – producer, composer
- Brett McLaughlin – composer
- Duncan de Moor – composer, lyricist, featured artist
- Jordan Palmer – composer
- Sydney Cubit – composer

== Charts ==
Chart (2020–2021)	Peak position
Belgium (Ultratip Bubbling Under Flanders)	34
Netherlands (Dutch Top 40)	25
Netherlands (Single Top 100)	85
