= Someone Else (song) =

Single by Duncan Laurence

from the album Small Town Boy and the EP Worlds on Fire
- Released: 13 May 2020
- Length: 3:04
- Label: Spark
- Songwriters: Brett McLaughlin; Bram Inscore; Jonny Price; Duncan Laurence; PJ Harding
- Producers: Brett McLaughlin; Bram Inscore

Duncan Laurence singles chronology
"Love Don't Hate It" (2019)	"Someone Else" (2020)	"Last Night" (2020)

Music video
- "Someone Else" on YouTube

"Someone Else" is a song by Dutch singer Duncan Laurence. It was released as a digital download on 13 May 2020 by Spark Records as the third single from his debut studio album Small Town Boy, the song also features on his debut EP Worlds on Fire. The song was written by Brett McLaughlin, Bram Inscore, Jonny Price, Duncan Laurence and PJ Harding.

== Background ==
Talking about the song, Laurence said: "'Someone Else' is about the feeling you can get when you're all by yourself and your head starts spinning and replaying memories of a previous relationship. [...] Where you normally find comfort and distraction in your daily life, these days you are confronted almost every minute with those thoughts".

== Live performances ==
On 16 May 2020, Laurence performed the song live on Eurovision: Europe Shine a Light. It replaced the Eurovision Song Contest 2020, which was planned to be held in Rotterdam, Netherlands, but was cancelled due to the COVID-19 pandemic. The show was broadcast live from Hilversum, Netherlands.

== Lyric video ==
A lyric video for "Someone Else" was released on 13 May 2020, in tandem with the song and EP's release. Directed by Laurence and his then-boyfriend Jordan Garfield, it features Laurence walking at night, singing the song to the camera – the video commonly utilizes close-ups on his face.

== Personnel ==
Credits adapted from Tidal.

- Bram Inscore – Producer, composer, lyricist, associated performer, bass guitar, drum programming, guitar, keyboards, piano, wurlitzer organ
- Brett McLaughlin – Producer, composer, lyricist, associated performer, background vocalist, engineer, studio personnel
- Duncan Laurence – Composer, lyricist, associated performer, background vocalist, vocals
- Jonny Price – Composer, lyricist
- PJ Harding – Composer, lyricist
- Cenzo Townshend – Mixer, studio personnel

== Charts ==
=== Weekly charts ===
Chart (2020)	Peak position
Belgium (Ultratip Bubbling Under Flanders)	36
Belgium (Ultratip Bubbling Under Wallonia)	43
Netherlands (Dutch Top 40)	18
Netherlands (Single Top 100)	72

=== Year-end charts ===
Chart (2020)	Position
Netherlands (Dutch Top 40)	88
