= Love Don't Hate It =

Single by Duncan Laurence

from the album Small Town Boy and the EP Worlds on Fire
- Released: 23 October 2019
- Length: 2:51
- Label: Spark
- Songwriter(s): Duncan de Moor; Michelle Buzz; Robert Gerongco; Sam Farrar; Samuel Gerongco
- Producer(s): Tofer Brown

Duncan Laurence singles chronology
"Arcade" (2019)	"Love Don't Hate It" (2019)	"Someone Else" (2020)

Music video
- "Love Don't Hate It" on YouTube

"Love Don't Hate It" is a song by Dutch singer-songwriter Duncan Laurence. It was released as a digital download on 23 October 2019 by Spark Records as the second single from his debut studio album Small Town Boy, the song also features on his debut EP Worlds on Fire. It is the follow-up to "Arcade", Laurence's winning entry at the Eurovision Song Contest 2019.

== Background ==
Laurence previously stated that he did not want to rush out a follow-up to "Arcade", but rather take his time and wait until he found the right song. De Telegraaf announced on 14 October that fans that had attended Laurence's performance in Nijmegen were told the follow-up single would be "Love Don't Hate It". Laurence called it "a song about fighting for who you are and who you choose to love" and his "answer against the hate in the world, that will always keep trying to break down what we crave most: love".

== Live performance ==
Duncan premiered the song on Dutch television during De Wereld Draait Door on 23 October.

== Music video ==
A music video for "Love Don't Hate It" was released on 8 November. Directed by Ed Sayers of Seven Productions, it features Laurence in a dark area, singing amongst red lights and celluloid film effects. Bryan Kress of Billboard wrote, "With so much on the line, [Laurence] looks every bit prepared to lead the way and fight to the end." In an interview with Promonews, Sayers explained the process to achieve the video's effects: "A pretty singular approach with a mix of hard and soft dynamic lighting using white and red lights and a host of special flare lens to fire firey light down the barrel and onto Super 16mm film and a little Super 8mm."

== Personnel ==
Credits adapted from Tidal.

- Tofer Brown – Producer, associated performer, background vocalist, engineer, guitar, piano, programmer, studio personnel
- Duncan de Moor – Composer, lyricist, associated performer, vocals
- Michelle Buzz – Composer, lyricist
- Robert Gerongco – Composer, lyricist
- Sam Farrar – Composer, lyricist, associated performer, guitar, programmer
- Samuel Gerongco – Composer, lyricist
- Ilse DeLange – Associated performer, background vocalist
- Tijmen Zinkhaan – Engineer, studio personnel
- Frank Arkwright – Mastering engineer, studio personnel
- Cenzo Townshend – Mixer, studio personnel
- Andy Selby – Studio personnel, vocal editing

== Charts ==
=== Weekly charts ===
Chart (2019–2020)	Peak position
Belgium (Ultratip Bubbling Under Flanders)	3
Netherlands (Dutch Top 40)	6
Netherlands (Single Top 100)	41

=== Year-end charts ===
Chart (2019)	Position
Netherlands (Dutch Top 40)	99
Chart (2020)	Position
Netherlands (Dutch Top 40)	53

== Certifications ==
Region	Certification	Certified units/sales
Netherlands (NVPI)	Gold	40,000^{‡}
^{‡} Sales+streaming figures based on certification alone.
