= Hangman's House =

1928 film by John Ford

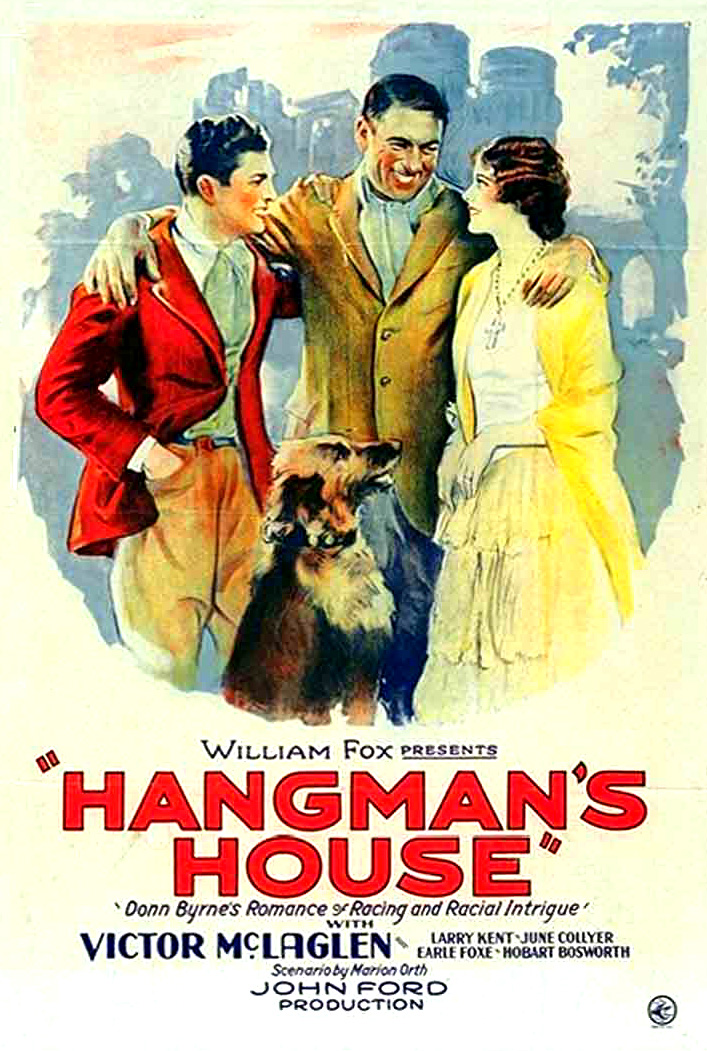
- Original Theatrical Poster
- Directed by: John Ford
- Written by: Brian Oswald Donn-Byrne; Malcolm Stuart Boylan; Philip Klein (adaptation); Marion Orth (scenario)
- Produced by: John Ford
- Starring: Victor McLaglen; Larry Kent; June Collyer; Earle Foxe; Hobart Bosworth
- Cinematography: George Schneiderman
- Edited by: Margaret Clancey
- Distributed by: Fox Film Corporation
- Release date: May 13, 1928
- Running time: 70 minutes
- Country: United States
- Languages: Silent film; English intertitles

Hangman's House is a 1928 American romantic drama genre silent film set in County Wicklow, Ireland, directed by John Ford (uncredited) with inter-titles written by Malcolm Stuart Boylan. It is based on a novel by Brian Oswald Donn-Byrne. It was adapted by Philip Klein with scenarios by Marion Orth. The film is also notable for containing the first confirmed appearance by John Wayne in a John Ford film.

== Plot ==
The full film

While stationed in Algiers, Commandant Denis Hogan receives a letter containing bad news and requests leave to return to his home country of Ireland, where he is a wanted man. In Ireland, Baron James O'Brien is told by his doctor that he has no more than a month to live. He decides to marry off his only daughter Connaught to a socialite, John D'Arcy, despite her love of childhood friend Dermot McDermot.

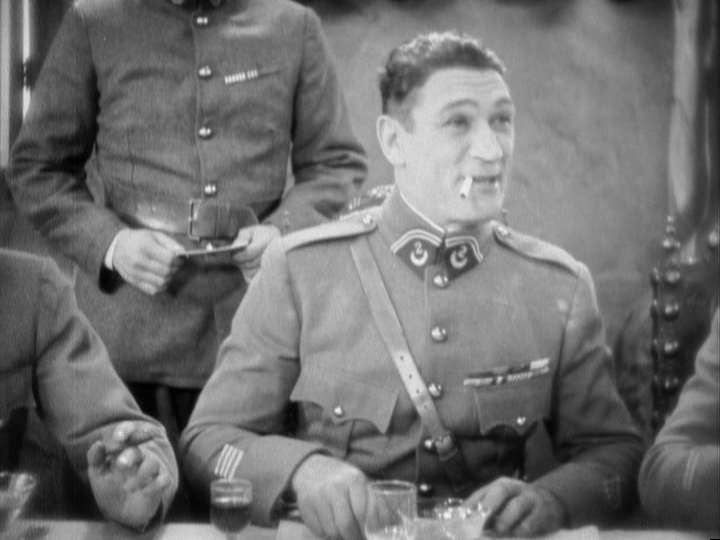
Victor McLaglen as the film's heroic figure Hogan.

Hogan returns to Ireland and disguises himself as a holy man. On his way to the O'Brien's house he is recognized by a gatekeeper, to whom he reveal his intention to kill a man. Hogan meets Dermot McDermot and the three men witness the lights of Glenmalure's chapel being lit, signifying a wedding is taking place. Later that night, after Connaught and D'Arcy have been wed, the Baron dies. On the night of his funeral Hogan sneaks about the grounds of Hangman's House and is spotted by D'Arcy. D'Arcy tries to sleep with Connaught but she rejects his advances.

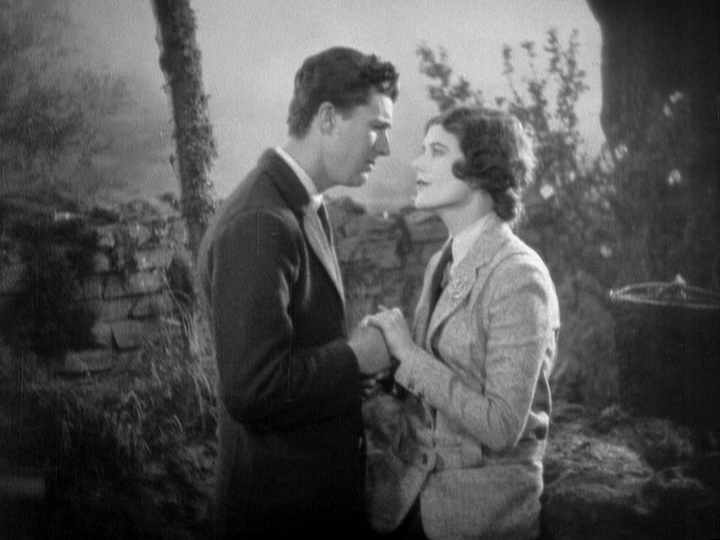
Larry Kent (left) and June Collyer (right) as the film's romantic couple.

A community race is held on Saint Stephen's Day and Connaught's horse, The Bard, is due to race. The horse's jockey goes missing just before the race because of interference from D'Arcy, who has bet against the horse. Dermot is required to jockey the horse and he wins the race, leading a drunken D'Arcy to shoot The Bard. D'Arcy is ostracised by the community because of this. Hogan is arrested at the race. At night Dermot and D'Arcy meet in a pub where D'Arcy reveals that he had an affair with Hogan's sister. Dermot gives D'Arcy money to leave Ireland and threatens that if he ever sees him again, he will kill him.

Hogan escapes from prison and a gunfight erupts between his men and the guards. Dermot and Connaught visit Hogan's hideout and Hogan reveals that his sister died following D'Arcy's desertion. Connaught returns to Hangman's House to discover that D'Arcy has returned. After a struggle she flees to Dermot's house. Hogan and Dermot go to Hangman's House and confront D'Arcy. During a fight between the men a fire breaks out and burns down the house. Hogan and Dermot escape but D'Arcy falls to his death as a balcony collapses. Connaught and Dermot see Hogan off at the port as he returns to Algiers. Connaught and Dermot depart together as Hogan watches.

== Cast ==
- Victor McLaglen as Citizen Denis Hogan
- June Collyer as Connaught "Conn" O'Brien
- Earle Fox as John D'Arcy
- Larry Kent as Dermot McDermot
- Hobart Bosworth as Lord Justice O'Brien
- John Wayne as Horse Race Spectator/Condemned Man in Flashback (uncredited)
- Brian Desmond Hurst as Horse Race Spectator and witness to the horse shooting (uncredited)

== Production ==
The film began production in January 1928 and took seven weeks to film.

== Reception ==
The film received positive reviews, Wilfred Beaton of Film Spectator called it "the finest program picture ever turned out by a studio". In particular he praised the photography which he said "almost outdoes for sheer beauty the shots in Street Angel and Sunrise". Variety shared this opinion by proclaiming the film had "some of the most striking touches of composition seen on the screen since those swampland shots in Sunrise, which they often resemble." However the film was not a box office success as Fox Film Corporation did not promote the film.

== Home media ==
The film was released on DVD in North America by Fox on December 4, 2007. The film can be obtained three different ways:

- In the Ford at Fox - The Collection box set which is a 21 disc collection containing most of the films John Ford made at Fox.
- In the Ford At Fox Collection: John Ford's Silent Epics which also contains Just Pals, Four Sons, The Iron Horse and 3 Bad Men.
- As a separate release also containing 3 Bad Men on the opposite side of the disc.

The DVD begins with a disclaimer stating that the film has been brought to DVD using the best surviving elements possible. The DVD has an option to view the film accompanied with a musical score by Tim Curran.

== See also ==
- John Wayne filmography
- List of American films of 1928
