= Small Town Boy (album) =

Studio album by Duncan Laurence
- Released: 13 November 2020
- Length: 41:23
- Label: Spark
- Producer: Bradley Richard Mair; Duncan Laurence; Lodewijk Martens; Will Knox; Arjen Mensinga; Oscar Holleman; Wouter Hardy; Jordan Garfield; Miki Trybulec; Bram Inscore; Brett McLaughlin; Tofer Brown; Armin van Buuren; Benno de Goeij

Duncan Laurence chronology
Worlds on Fire (2020)	Small Town Boy (2020)	Skyboy (2023)

Singles from Small Town Boy
- 1. "Arcade" Released: 7 March 2019; 2. "Love Don't Hate It" Released: 23 October 2019; 3. "Someone Else" Released: 13 May 2020; 4. "Last Night" Released: 1 October 2020; 5. "Feel Something" Released: 6 November 2020; 6. "Stars" Released: 21 May 2021

Small Town Boy is the debut studio album by Dutch singer Duncan Laurence. It was released on 13 November 2020 by Spark Records. The album includes the singles "Arcade", "Love Don't Hate It", "Someone Else", "Last Night" and "Feel Something". A deluxe edition of the album was released on 21 May 2021, containing three additional tracks: "Stars", "Sad Old Me" and "I Got You".

== Background ==
Laurence wrote the album with the help of his boyfriend Jordan Garfield. He said, "We really got to know each other way better through writing music too because you share stories together in a whole different way and you go really deep into those stories and maybe sometimes you get to express emotions that you wouldn't normally express if it's not in writing a song." Laurence also produced a lot of songs on the album and directed many of his music videos. By being involved in the process of both, he believed "that he would be able to merge the two creative worlds together more seamlessly". He said, "It is a good way to not only express yourself via music but also via visuals because they go so well with each other."

== Singles ==
"Arcade" was released as the lead single from the album on 7 March 2019. The song peaked at number one on the Dutch Singles Chart. The song represented the Netherlands at the Eurovision Song Contest 2019, in which it won. "Love Don't Hate It" was released as the second single from the album on 23 October 2019. The song peaked at number forty-one on the Dutch Singles Chart. "Someone Else" was released as the third single from the album on 13 May 2020. The song peaked at number seventy-two on the Dutch Singles Chart. "Last Night" was released as the fourth single from the album on 1 October 2020. "Feel Something" was released as the fifth single from the album on 6 November 2020. The song peaked at number eighty-five on the Dutch Singles Chart.

== Track listing ==
Small Town Boy track listing
No.	Title	Writer(s)	Producer(s)	Length
1.	"Beautiful"	Bradley Richard Mair; de Moor; Martin Konijnenburg; Tom Martin	Bradley Richard Mair; Duncan Laurence	4:17
2.	"Yet"	de Moor; Lodewijk Martens; Matthijs De Ronden; Will Knox	Duncan Laurence; Lodewijk Martens; Will Knox	3:03
3.	"Between Good and Goodbye"	Chris Ayer; de Moor; Matt Simons	Arjen Mensinga; Duncan Laurence	4:06
4.	"Loves You Like I Couldn't Do"	Daniel Bryer; de Moor; Mike Needle	Mensinga; Duncan Laurence	3:49
5.	"Sleeping on the Phone"	de Moor; Jordan Garfield	Mensinga; Duncan Laurence	3:09
6.	"Arcade"	de Moor; Joel Sjöö; Knox; Wouter Hardy	Oscar Holleman; Wouter Hardy	3:05
7.	"Figure It Out"	de Moor; Garfield	Mensinga; Duncan Laurence; Jordan Garfield	2:53
8.	"Last Night"	Ashley Hicklin; de Moor; Garfield; Mikolaj Trybulec	Mensinga; Duncan Laurence; Miki Trybulec	2:52
9.	"Someone Else"	Bram Inscore; Brett McLaughlin; de Moor; Jonny Price; PJ Harding	Bram Inscore; Brett McLaughlin	3:04
10.	"Love Don't Hate It"	de Moor; Michelle Buzz; Robert Gerongco; Sam Farrar; Samuel Gerongco	Tofer Brown	2:53
11.	"Umbrella"	de Moor; Garfield	Mensinga; Duncan Laurence	5:08
12.	"Feel Something" (Armin van Buuren featuring Duncan Laurence)	de Moor; Armin van Buuren; Benno de Goeij; McLaughlin; Laurence	van Buuren; de Goeij	3:04
Total length:				41:23

Digital re-release bonus track
No.	Title	Writer(s)	Producer(s)	Length
13.	"Arcade" (featuring Fletcher)	Laurence; Joel Sjöö; Knox; Wouter Hardy; Cari Fletcher	Oscar Holleman; Wouter Hardy	3:07
Total length:				44:30

Deluxe edition bonus tracks
No.	Title	Writer(s)	Producer(s)	Length
12.	"Stars"	de Moor; McLaughlin; Garfield; Hardy	Hardy	2:52
13.	"Sad Old Me"	de Moor; Garfield	Inscore	3:23
14.	"I Got You"	de Moor; Inscore; Garfield	Inscore	3:08
15.	"Feel Something" (Armin van Buuren featuring Duncan Laurence)	de Moor; van Buuren; de Goeij; McLaughlin; Palmer; Cubit	van Buuren; de Goeij	2:37
16.	"Arcade" (featuring Fletcher)	de Moor; Sjöö; Knox; Hardy; Fletcher	Holleman; Hardy	3:05
17.	"Arcade" (Sam Feldt remix)	de Moor; Sjöö; Knox; Hardy	Holleman; Hardy; Sam Feldt	2:36
Total length:				55:59

== Personnel ==
Credits adapted from the album's liner notes.

- Rens Dekker – artwork
- Duncan Laurence – liner notes
- Elise Hama – grooming
- Anouk van Griensven – styling
- Paul Bellaart – photography

== Charts ==
Chart performance for Small Town Boy
Chart (2020)	Peak position
Belgian Albums (Ultratop Flanders)	94
Dutch Albums (Album Top 100)	6
US Heatseekers Albums (Billboard)	8

== Certifications ==
Certifications for Small Town Boy
Region	Certification	Certified units/sales
Netherlands (NVPI)	Platinum	40,000^{‡}
^{‡} Sales+streaming figures based on certification alone.

== Release history ==
Release history for Small Town Boy
Region	Date	Format	Label
Netherlands	13 November 2020	Digital download; streaming	Spark
