= Larry Kent (actor) =

American actor

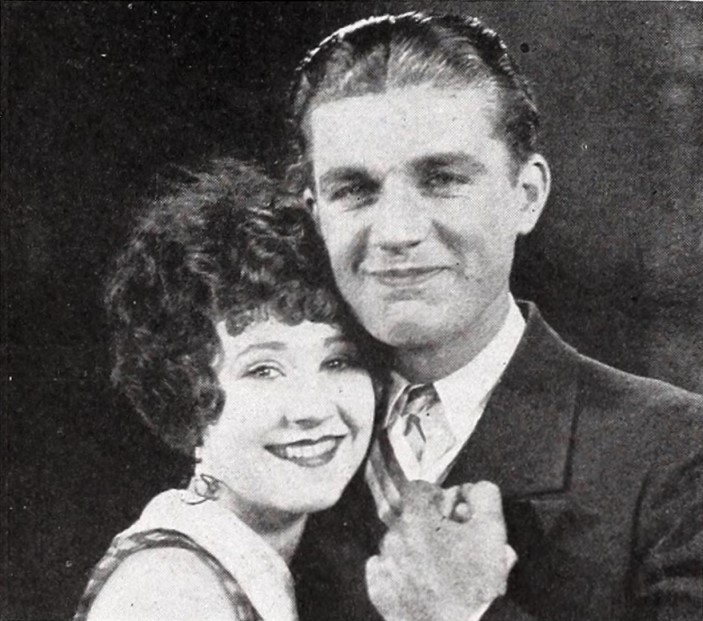
- Publicity photograph with Alberta Vaughn and Larry Kent (right)
- Born: 15 September 1900; Los Angeles, United States
- Died: 7 November 1967 (aged 67); Los Angeles, United States
- Occupation: Actor
- Years active: 1925 – 1964

Larry Kent (15 September 1900 – 7 November 1967) was an American film actor and producer.

== Career ==
Between 1925 and 1964 Kent acted in 52 films and a handful of TV shows including Rawhide. He had a successful career as a lead and supporting actor in the silent era but failed to make the transition to sound films and was cast largely in bit parts until his retirement in 1964. His last film role was an uncredited part in the Elvis film Viva Las Vegas. His most notable roles were in John Ford's Hangman's House (1928), Seas Beneath (1931) and opposite Jean Arthur in The Masked Menace (1927). In 1933 he produced the short film Aces Wild.

== Partial filmography ==
- Eyes Right! (1926)
- Obey the Law (1926)
- McFadden's Flats (1927)
- The Sea Tiger (1927)
- The Whirlwind of Youth (1927)
- Women's Wares (1927)
- The Masked Menace (1927)
- The Lovelorn (1927)
- Her Wild Oat (1927)
- Mad Hour (1928)
- The Heart of a Follies Girl (1928)
- Hangman's House (1928)
- The Head Man (1928)
- The Haunted House (1928)
- The Devil's Apple Tree (1929)
- Midstream (1929)
- Around the Corner (1930)
- Seas Beneath (1931)
- Women Won't Tell (1932)
- Man Hunt (1936)
- Times Square Playboy (1936)
- What Becomes of the Children? (1936)

== Television ==
Year	Title	Role	Notes
1961	Rawhide	Conductor	S3:E16, "Incident on the Road Back"
1961	Rawhide	Judge	S3:E30, "Incident of the Wager on Payday"
1962	Rawhide	Croupier	S4:E21, "The Pitchwagon"
1962	Rawhide	First Drover	S4:E29, "The Devil and the Deep Blue"
