= Charles Anthony Hughes =

American actor

Charles Hughes
- Born: Charles Anthony Hughes; March 21, 1890; Augusta, Georgia, U.S.
- Died: July 11, 1967 (aged 77); Augusta, Georgia, U.S.
- Years active: 1927–1955

Charles Anthony Hughes (March 21, 1890 – July 11, 1967) was an actor in American films and television. He appeared in several Three Stooges films.

== Partial filmography ==
- The Crimson Flash (1927) as Dale (as Tony Hughes)
- Mark of the Frog (1928), a 10-chapter film serial (credited as Tony Hughes)
- The West Parade (1932)
- Crime Without Passion (1934) (uncredited)
- Always in Trouble (1938)
- Ride a Crooked Mile (1938)
- Touchdown Army (1938)
- The Frontiersmen (1938) as Mayor Judson Thorpe
- Ladies in Distress (1938) as Lieutenant
- Women in the Wind (1939) as Bill Steele
- The Last Alarm (1940) as Lieutenant King
- The Bride Came C.O.D. (1941) as Policeman (uncredited)
- Timber Queen as Harold Talbot
- Practically Yours (1944) as Radio Announcer
- Masquerade in Mexico (1945) as FBI agent
- Blue Dahlia as Lieutenant Lloyd
- Roughly Speaking (1945) as Financier
- The Cariboo Trail (1950) as Dr. John S. Rhodes (as Tony Hughes)
- Highway Dragnet (1954) as Chubby Border Inspection Officer (as Tony Hughes)
- Daddy Long Legs (1955), a musical, as Hotel Manager
