= The Devil's Apple Tree =

1929 film

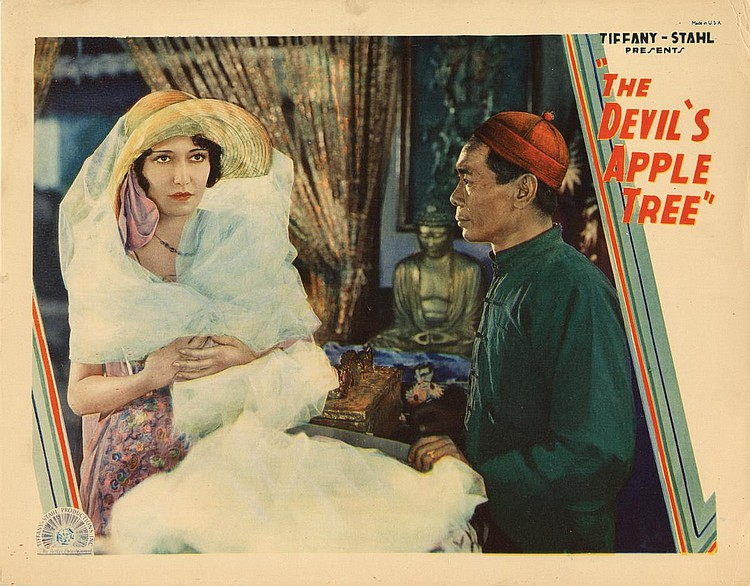
- Directed by: Elmer Clifton
- Written by: Fanny Hatton; Frederic Hatton; Lillian Ducey
- Produced by: John M. Stahl
- Starring: Dorothy Sebastian; Larry Kent; Edward Martindel
- Cinematography: Ernest Miller
- Edited by: Frank Sullivan
- Production company: Tiffany Pictures
- Distributed by: Tiffany Pictures
- Release date: February 20, 1929
- Running time: 7 Reels
- Country: United States
- Languages: Silent; English intertitles

The Devil's Apple Tree is a 1929 American silent drama film directed by Elmer Clifton and starring Dorothy Sebastian, Larry Kent and Edward Martindel. It is now considered to be a lost film.

== Cast ==
- Dorothy Sebastian as Dorothy Ryan
- Larry Kent as John Rice
- Edward Martindel as Col. Rice
- Ruth Clifford as Jane Norris
- George Cooper as Cooper
- Cosmo Kyrle Bellew as The Roué

== Bibliography ==
- Pitts, Michael R. Poverty Row Studios, 1929–1940: An Illustrated History of 55 Independent Film Companies, with a Filmography for Each. McFarland & Company, 2005.
