= Melody of Love (1928 film) =

1928 film

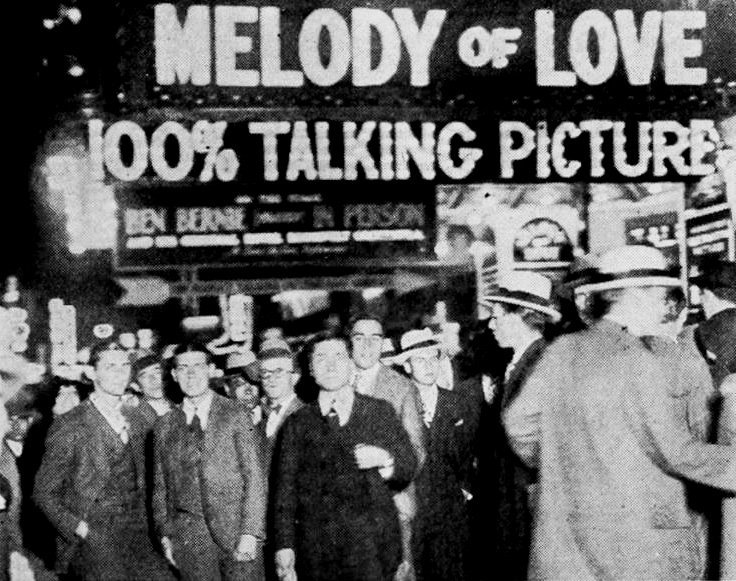
- Colony Theatre in New York City showing the film
- Directed by: Arch Heath
- Screenplay by: Robert Arch (& titles)
- Story by: Arch Heath; Robert Arch
- Starring: Walter Pidgeon; Mildred Harris
- Cinematography: Walter Scott
- Edited by: Bernard W. Burton; Robert Carlisle
- Music by: Bert Fiske
- Production company: Universal Pictures
- Distributed by: Universal Pictures
- Release dates: October 10, 1928 (San Francisco); December 2, 1928 (U.S.)
- Running time: 83 minutes
- Country: United States
- Languages: Sound (All-Talking); English

Melody of Love is a 1928 American sound romantic drama film produced and distributed by Universal Pictures, directed by Arch Heath, which starred Walter Pidgeon and Mildred Harris, each their first sound film.

Historically significant as Universal's first 100% all-talkie, the production suffered from having a tight shooting schedule. Carl Laemmle was only able to rent the Fox Movietone sound-on-film recording system for one week, having to be filmed at night while the Fox Studio was closed down for the evenings.

== Plot ==
Jack Clark (Walter Pidgeon), a gifted young songwriter, dreams of composing a great American ballad and sharing his success with Flo Thompson (Jane Winton), a glamorous showgirl who has won his heart. Flo, however, is more interested in career than commitment—and less moved by Jack's patriotism than he would like.

When Jack's loyal pal “Lefty” (Tommy Dugan) proudly announces he's enlisted, Jack is inspired to join the Army as well. Flo is displeased—she finds war foolish and patriotism old-fashioned—but she promises to wait for him.

In France, Jack and Lefty meet Madelon (Mildred Harris), a gentle French cabaret singer with a warm voice and a wistful charm. Lefty is immediately smitten, but it is Jack's poetic soul that quietly captures her affection. Jack, loyal to Flo, rebuffs Madelon's interest—even as her songs echo in his heart.

Then, war intervenes. During a harrowing battle, Jack is grievously wounded. When he recovers, he is devastated to learn that his right arm—his composing arm—is paralyzed. The piano keys are silent beneath his fingers, and with them, so is his creative spirit.

Back in New York, Jack's heartbreak deepens. Flo, disenchanted by his disability and disinterest in showbiz ambition, cruelly dismisses him. Despondent and unable to work, Jack drifts into poverty and isolation, disappearing from his old circle of friends.

Meanwhile, across the Atlantic, Madelon has not forgotten him. With quiet determination, she travels to America in search of Jack. She finds Lefty, who now runs a modest cabaret. He breaks the sad news: Jack has vanished—he cut himself off from the world. But Lefty, touched by Madelon's devotion, offers her a place as the star singer in his show.

One night, wandering aimlessly, Jack hears a haunting voice drifting from a cabaret door. It is Madelon. Drawn inside by the music, he sits down at the piano in a daze. As Madelon sings, something inside Jack stirs. Tentatively, he reaches out—and miraculously, his hand responds. The melody flows again. The music has returned, as has his hope.

Madelon sees him, and in their eyes is the recognition of something stronger than time or war: love. Jack has found his muse not in glittering ambition, but in the girl who sang to his soul.

== Cast ==
- Walter Pidgeon as Jack Clark
- Mildred Harris as Madelon
- Jane Winton as Flo Thompson
- Tommy Dugan as "Lefty"
- Jack Richardson as Music Publisher
- Victor Potel as The Gawk
- Flynn O'Malley as The Sergeant

== Music ==
The film featured a theme song entitled "My Sweetheart" which was composed by Gus Kahn, Larry Conley, and Gene Rodemich.

== Preservation ==
No full copies of Melody of Love are known to exist in any film archives, so it is considered to be a lost film, although an incomplete print exists.

== See also ==
- List of early sound feature films (1926–1929)
