= The Head Man =

1928 film

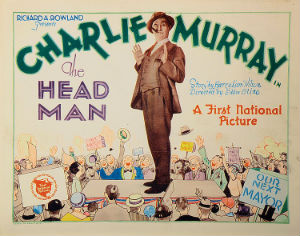
- Theatrical release poster
- Directed by: Edward F. Cline
- Screenplay by: Gerald Duffy; Howard J. Green; Sidney Lazarus; Harvey F. Thew
- Story by: Harvey F. Thew; Harry Leon Wilson
- Starring: Charles Murray; Loretta Young; Larry Kent; Lucien Littlefield; E. J. Ratcliffe; Irving Bacon
- Cinematography: Mike Joyce
- Edited by: Terry O. Morse
- Production company: First National Pictures
- Distributed by: First National Pictures
- Release date: July 8, 1928
- Running time: 65 minutes
- Country: United States
- Language: English

The Head Man is a 1928 American drama film directed by Edward F. Cline and written by Gerald Duffy, Howard J. Green, Sidney Lazarus and Harvey F. Thew. The film stars Charles Murray, Loretta Young, Larry Kent, Lucien Littlefield, E. J. Ratcliffe and Irving Bacon. The film was released on July 8, 1928, by First National Pictures.

== Cast ==
- Charles Murray as Watts
- Loretta Young as Carol Watts
- Larry Kent as Billy Hurd
- Lucien Littlefield as Ed Barnes
- E. J. Ratcliffe as Wareham
- Irving Bacon as Mayor
- Harvey Clark as McKugg
- Sylvia Ashton as Mrs. Briggs
- Dot Farley as Mrs. Denny
- Martha Mattox as Twin
- Rosa Gore as Twin

== Preservation ==
The Head Man is currently presumed lost. In February of 2021, the film was cited by the National Film Preservation Board on their Lost U.S. Silent Feature Films list.
