= Arcade (song) =

2019 song by Duncan Laurence

Single by Duncan Laurence

from the album Small Town Boy and the EP Worlds on Fire
- Released: 7 March 2019
- Genre: Pop
- Length: 3:04
- Label: Spark; Universal
- Songwriters: Duncan Laurence; Joel Sjöö; Wouter Hardy; Will Knox
- Producers: Wouter Hardy; Oscar Holleman

Duncan Laurence singles chronology
"Arcade" (2019)	"Love Don't Hate It" (2019)

Music video
- "Arcade" on YouTube

Eurovision Song Contest 2019 entry
- Country: Netherlands

Finals performance
- Semi-final result: 1st
- Semi-final points: 280
- Final result: 1st
- Final points: 498

Entry chronology
- ◄ "Outlaw in 'Em" (2018)
- "Grow" (2020) ►

Official performance video
- "Arcade" (Second semi-final) on YouTube "Arcade" (Grand Final) on YouTube "Arcade" (Reprise) on YouTube

"Arcade" is a song by Dutch singer-songwriter Duncan Laurence. It was written and composed by Laurence, Joel Sjöö, Wouter Hardy, and Will Knox. The song was released on 7 March 2019 by Spark Records. It was later included as the lead single on his debut studio album Small Town Boy, and also features on his debut EP Worlds on Fire.

"Arcade" represented the Netherlands in the Eurovision Song Contest 2019 in Tel Aviv, Israel, which it won, marking the Netherlands' first Eurovision victory since 1975. After the complete line-up of songs was announced, "Arcade" was the bookmakers' favourite to win Eurovision, and had remained so until the contest ended. An acoustic version of the song was released on 19 July 2019, followed by a duet version featuring American singer Fletcher on 27 November 2020. In February 2020, "Arcade" won an Edison Award for Best Pop Song of the Year.

In the second half of 2020, "Arcade" went viral on social media platform TikTok, resulting in new chart successes and streams on various platforms. In January 2021, "Arcade" became the most-streamed Eurovision song on Spotify, passing "Soldi" by Mahmood, the runner-up of Eurovision 2019. Later that year, in April, "Arcade" became the first Eurovision song in 25 years and the first Eurovision winning song in 45 years to chart on the US Billboard Hot 100; by September, it peaked at number 30.

In August 2023, "Arcade" became the first Eurovision song to accumulate a billion streams on Spotify.

== Background ==
=== Composition ===
Duncan Laurence wrote "Arcade" while he attended the Tilburg Rock Academy. He worked on the song for over two years, predominantly while collaborating with Wouter Hardy, a former band member with Sharon Kovacs. The song is inspired by the heartbreak of a loved one of Duncan's who died. Laurence told WiwiBloggs, "Arcade is a story about the search for the love of your life. It's about the hope to reach something that seems unreachable". The namesake lyric "Small town boy in a big arcade" refers to his experience, being from a small town, as a Rock Academy freshman entering the summer fair of Tilburg, the largest in the Netherlands. Throughout the song, the fair and its arcade games are used as a metaphor for love, addiction and gambling with relationships.

"Arcade" is inspired by film soundtracks and consists of 165 tracks. The pop song opens with four chords played on piano, accompanied by a simple piano riff and overdubbed vocals. The triple metre verses contrast with the 4/4 time signature of the rest of the song, giving it a distinct sound. Heavy emphasis is put on Laurence's vocals. After the soft verses, in which he expresses his sadness and vulnerability, the chorus kicks in with heavy drums, accompanied with a choir of backing vocals, to enhance the lyrics' expressions of anger and frustration.

=== Internal selection ===
Ilse DeLange, runner-up of Eurovision 2014 as a member of The Common Linnets, came across Duncan in The Voice of Holland later that year, where she became his coach, and he regularly shared his songs with her since. DeLange sent one of those songs, "Arcade", to AVROTROS for its Eurovision selection. On 21 January 2019, Laurence was revealed as its representative for the 64th edition of the Eurovision Song Contest, after "Arcade" was internally selected by the Dutch broadcaster. The song was never specifically written for Eurovision. Following the announcement, AVROTROS received backlash from Dutch social media users because of the decision to select an unknown artist to represent the Netherlands in the contest, after previously sending unknown artists who usually achieved poor results for the country.

=== Release and promotion ===
The song was revealed on 7 March 2019. Shortly after its release, the Netherlands became the leader of the betting odds; by April 2019, AVROTROS revealed they had a hosting plan on hand in case of a Dutch victory in Eurovision, written years beforehand, and The Hague had already applied a bid for hosting the following contest, might Laurence take home the trophy.

On 14 April 2019 Laurence performed "Arcade" during the London Eurovision Party, which was held at the Café de Paris venue in London. In addition to international appearances, promotional activities also occurred within the Netherlands where he performed at live events, radio shows and talk shows. On 6 April, he performed during the Eurovision in Concert event which was held at the AFAS Live venue in Amsterdam, and on 1 May he performed at a sold-out solo concert which was held at the Zonnehuis in Amsterdam.

=== Eurovision ===
On 14 May 2019, the second semi-final of the Eurovision Song Contest was held at the Expo Tel Aviv in Tel Aviv, hosted by the Israeli Public Broadcasting Corporation (IPBC/Kan). Laurence performed "Arcade" sixteenth on the evening, qualifying for the grand final. The performance of the song featured him sitting behind an electric grand piano, with three backing vocalists supporting him offstage. DeLange and the Netherlands' creative team decided that Laurence should sit behind a piano on stage, because, him being a singer-songwriter, they wanted to portray him on stage as a musician. Surrounding Laurence and his piano, smoke, water and lighting effects, reminiscent of the official music video, accompanied the performance. During the Eurovision week, the Netherlands remained a favourite to win the competition, according to the bookmakers; shortly before the contest's final, their chances of winning were as high as 46 percent.

On 14 May 2019, the final of the contest was held at the same venue. Laurence performed "Arcade" twelfth on the evening. At the end of voting, it had received the maximum score of 12 points from six national juries, and twice from national audiences. The Netherlands finished third in the jury vote, behind North Macedonia and Sweden, and second in the televote, behind Norway, but ended up winning the contest with 492 points. After the Belarusian jury's results were revised, the final number of points was 498. It was the first Eurovision victory for the country since 1975, when "Ding-a-dong" by Teach-In won. Apart from winning the contest, "Arcade" also won the Marcel Bezençon Press Award. During his victory speech, the artist said: "This is to dreaming big; this is to music first, always."

=== Aftermath ===
As the winning broadcaster, the European Broadcasting Union (EBU) gave AVROTROS the responsibility to host the following edition of the Eurovision Song Contest. This edition was cancelled due to the COVID-19 pandemic, and the special show Eurovision: Europe Shine a Light was held instead. AVROTROS, along with Nederlandse Publieke Omroep (NPO) and Nederlandse Omroep Stichting (NOS), would held the 65th edition on 18–22 May 2021 in Rotterdam. In the final, Laurence performed "Arcade" and "Stars" as part of the interval acts. (Note: Laurence's interval performance in the final was pre-recorded due to him testing positive for COVID-19 two days prior.)

== Critical reception ==
Upon its release, the track received mostly positive reactions. The sound of "Arcade" has been compared to that of Coldplay. Peter Van de Veire, Belgium's Dutch-language Eurovision commentator, said that the gravity of the song's lyrics and composition would appeal to Eurovision viewers. Editors of the Eurovision fan site Wiwibloggs praised the emotional atmosphere of "Arcade" and gave the song an average score of 9.15 out of 10. Dan Niazi from ESCXtra, another Eurovision fan site, said he was not prepared for a song "as good and as perfectly produced as Arcade" to represent the Netherlands. He praised the song's composition and lyrical content, and thought the song had "the potential of changing the face of the contest for good", comparing the song to Loreen's "Euphoria", Sweden's 2012 entry. OGAE members placed the song third overall, behind Switzerland's and Italy's entries.

Upon the Eurovision semi-final, reactions to the simplistic performance were mixed. The Telegraph's Charlotte Runcie found that "the song deserves to do well, but the pared-back staging was in danger of being forgettable". Heidi Stephens, reporter for The Guardian, found the Dutch performance "bleak, but hauntingly beautiful". Writing for The Independent, Rob Holley found that "Arcade" was well performed, and although he feared that the performance was underwhelming for Eurovision standards, he thought the Netherlands were the biggest contenders for victory. The BBC's commentator for the semi-finals, Rylan Clark-Neal, put the Netherlands in his top five.

== Track listings ==
- Digital single
1. "Arcade" – 3:03
- Digital single – acoustic
1. "Arcade" (acoustic version) – 3:19
- 7-inch vinyl
1. "Arcade" – 3:03
2. "Arcade" (acoustic version) – 3:19
- Digital single – duet
1. "Arcade" (featuring Fletcher) – 3:07
- Digital single – Sam Feldt remix
1. "Arcade" (Sam Feldt remix) – 2:33

== Commercial performance ==
Following its Eurovision victory, "Arcade" reached the weekly charts of 26 European countries, peaking at number one in Belgium, Estonia, Iceland, Luxembourg and the Netherlands; it was subsequently certified quadruple platinum in the latter. Starting in late 2020, "Arcade" went viral on TikTok, resulting in renewed success on various weekly charts, including in the United States, where the song became a sleeper hit. It debuted at number 100 on the Billboard Hot 100 on 17 April 2021, and peaked at number 30 by 4 September.

On 18 May 2021, during the first semi-final of the Eurovision Song Contest 2021, Laurence received a Global Platinum certification for over a billion streams of "Arcade" worldwide. He was presented the award by the event's co-presenter Edsilia Rombley.

== Charts ==
=== Weekly charts ===
Weekly chart performance for "Arcade"
Chart (2019–2022)	Peak position
Austria (Ö3 Austria Top 40)	22
Belgium (Ultratop 50 Flanders)	2
Belgium (Ultratop 50 Wallonia)	31
Canada Hot 100 (Billboard)	45
Croatia (HRT)	32
Czech Republic Singles Digital (ČNS IFPI)	23
Denmark (Tracklisten)	23
Estonia (Eesti Tipp-40)	1
Euro Digital Song Sales (Billboard)	2
Finland Digital Song Sales (Billboard)	8
France (SNEP)	42
Germany (GfK)	26
Global 200 (Billboard)	36
Greece International (IFPI)	2
Hungary (Single Top 40)	27
Hungary (Stream Top 40)	34
Iceland (RÚV)	1
Iceland (Tónlistinn)	2
India International Singles (IMI)	4
Ireland (IRMA)	23
Israel International Airplay (Media Forest)	3
Latvia (LaIPA)	6
Lithuania (AGATA)	2
Luxembourg Digital Song Sales (Billboard)	1
Malaysia (RIM)	4
Netherlands (Dutch Top 40)	1
Netherlands (Mega Top 50)	1
Netherlands (Single Top 100)	1
New Zealand (Recorded Music NZ)	39
Norway (VG-lista)	10
Portugal (AFP)	6
Scottish Singles Sales (Official Charts)	24
Singapore (RIAS)	5
Slovakia (Singles Digitál Top 100)	29
Slovenia (SloTop50)	40
Spain (PROMUSICAE)	38
Sweden (Sverigetopplistan)	6
Switzerland (Schweizer Hitparade)	6
UK Singles (Official Charts)	29
Ukraine (Tophit)	48
US Billboard Hot 100	30
US Adult Contemporary (Billboard)	9
US Adult Pop Airplay (Billboard)	4
US Dance Airplay (Billboard)	31
US Pop Airplay (Billboard)	7

=== Year-end charts ===
2019 year-end chart performance for "Arcade"
Chart (2019)	Position
Belgium (Ultratop Flanders)	23
Iceland (Tónlistinn)	20
Netherlands (Dutch Top 40)	3
Netherlands (Single Top 100)	9

2021 year-end chart performance for "Arcade"
Chart (2021)	Position
France (SNEP)	66
Global 200 (Billboard)	83
India International Singles (IMI)	14
Norway (TOPPLISTA – årsliste – Singel 2021)	27
Portugal (Top 1000 Singles + EPs Digitais)	32
Sweden (Sverigetopplistan)	72
Switzerland (Schweizer Hitparade)	20
US Billboard Hot 100	82
US Adult Contemporary (Billboard)	16
US Adult Top 40 (Billboard)	13
US Mainstream Top 40 (Billboard)	33

== Certifications ==
Sales certifications for "Arcade"
Region	Certification	Certified units/sales
Australia (ARIA)	Platinum	70,000^{‡}
Austria (IFPI Austria)	Platinum	30,000^{‡}
Belgium (BRMA)	Platinum	40,000^{‡}
Brazil (Pro-Música Brasil)	3× Diamond	480,000^{‡}
Canada (Music Canada)	Platinum	80,000^{‡}
Denmark (IFPI Danmark)	Platinum	90,000^{‡}
France (SNEP)	Diamond	333,333^{‡}
Germany (BVMI)	Platinum	400,000^{‡}
Italy (FIMI)	Platinum	100,000^{‡}
Mexico (AMPROFON)	Platinum+Gold	90,000^{‡}
Netherlands (NVPI)	4× Platinum	320,000^{‡}
New Zealand (RMNZ)	2× Platinum	60,000^{‡}
Norway (IFPI Norway)	Gold	30,000^{‡}
Poland (ZPAV)	Diamond	250,000^{‡}
Portugal (AFP)	2× Platinum	20,000^{‡}
Spain (Promusicae)	Platinum	40,000^{‡}
United Kingdom (BPI)	Platinum	600,000^{‡}
United States (RIAA)	Platinum	1,000,000^{‡}
Streaming
Greece (IFPI Greece)	Gold	1,000,000^{†}
Sweden (GLF)	Gold	4,000,000^{†}
^{‡} Sales+streaming figures based on certification alone.^{†} Streaming-only figures based on certification alone.

== Release history ==
Release history for "Arcade"
Region	Date	Format	Label	Ref.
Various	7 March 2019	Digital download; streaming	Spark; Universal	
Various	14 August 2019	7-inch vinyl	Capitol	
United States	25 January 2021	Hot adult contemporary radio	Capitol	
United States	23 March 2021	Contemporary hit radio	Capitol	

== In popular culture ==
The song was featured three times in the Eurovision Home Concerts series, and covered by all the acts in Armenia's Depi Evratesil selection for the 2020 contest—that would be cancelled—in a group performance. The song was covered once again by Polish Junior Eurovision victors Roksana Węgiel and Viki Gabor, alongside a hologram image of Laurence as part of the interval act of the Junior Eurovision Song Contest 2020 which took place in Warsaw, Poland on 29 November 2020. It was used in the soundtrack of the third season of the Netflix series Young Royals. In 2023, Kazakh singer Daneliya Tuleshova covered the song for her preliminary round performance on America's Got Talent: All-Stars. On 5 May 2025, fellow Eurovision winner Loreen, who won representing Sweden in 2012 and 2023, released an upbeat electropop cover of "Arcade" for Spotify Singles.

== Notes ==
Preceded by "Toy" by Netta	Eurovision Song Contest winners 2019	Succeeded by "Zitti e buoni" by Måneskin
