= The Crimson Flash =

1927 film

- Directed by: Arch Heath
- Written by: Paul Fairfax Fuller; George Arthur Gray
- Starring: Cullen Landis; Eugenia Gilbert
- Distributed by: Pathé Exchange
- Release date: June 19, 1927
- Running time: 10 episodes
- Country: United States
- Languages: Silent; English intertitles

The Crimson Flash is a 1927 American action film serial directed by Arch Heath. The film is now considered to be lost. The movie was filmed partly The Oaks, a country estate in Goose Creek, South Carolina.

== Cast ==
- Cullen Landis
- Eugenia Gilbert
- Thomas Holding (as Tom Holding)
- J. Barney Sherry
- Walter P. Lewis
- Ivan Linow
- Mary Gardner
- Charles Anthony Hughes as Dale (as Tony Hughes)
- Gus De Weil
- Ed Roseman
- Howard Carey

== See also ==
- List of film serials
- List of film serials by studio
