= Modern Love (1929 film) =

1929 film

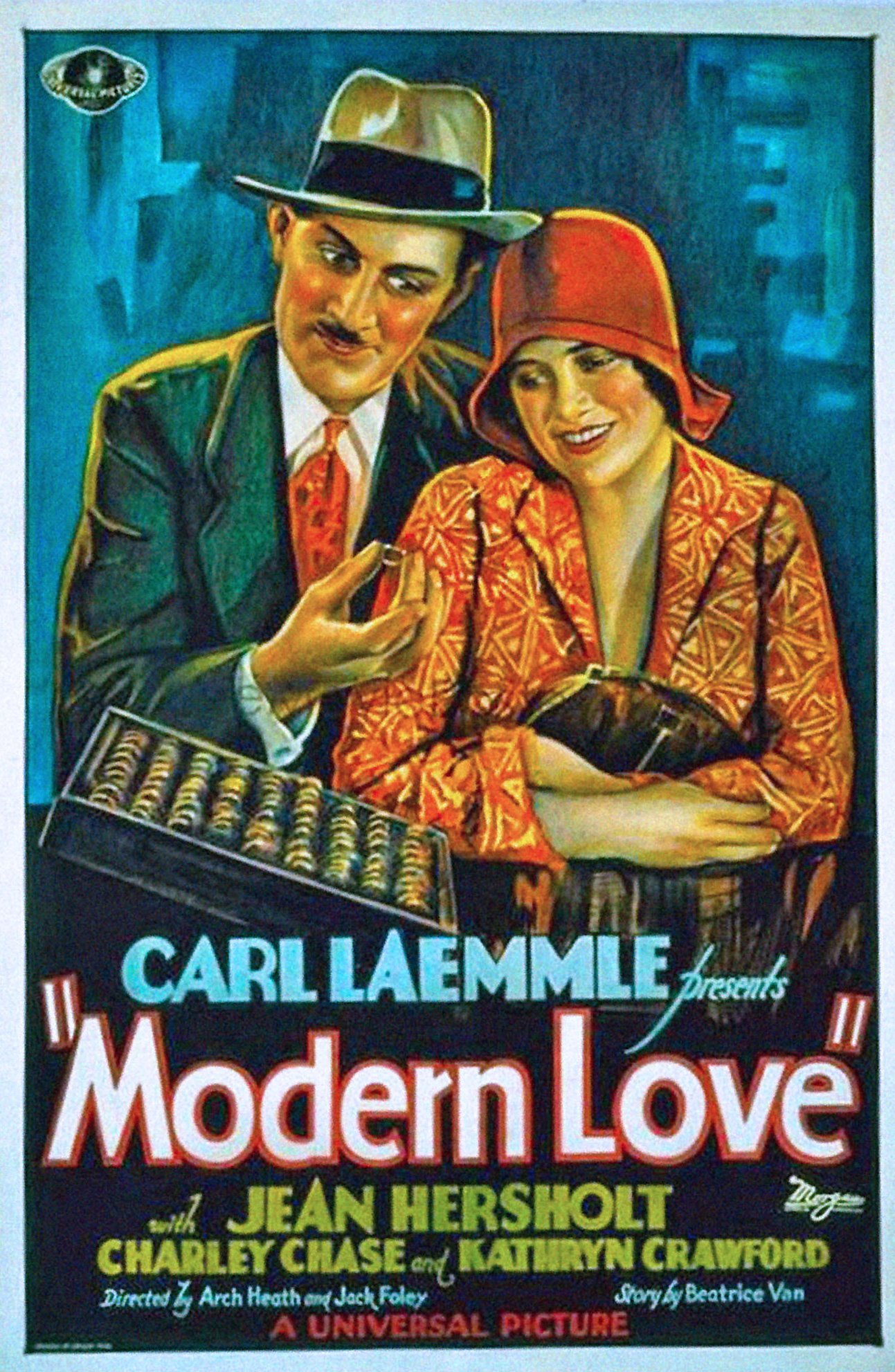
- Theatrical release poster
- Directed by: Arch Heath
- Screenplay by: Beatrice Van; Albert DeMond
- Story by: Beatrice Van
- Starring: Charley Chase; Kathryn Crawford; Jean Hersholt; Edward Martindel; Anita Garvin; Betty Montgomery
- Cinematography: Jerome Ash
- Music by: Bert Fiske
- Production company: Universal Pictures
- Distributed by: Universal Pictures
- Release date: July 21, 1929
- Running time: 71 minutes
- Country: United States
- Languages: Sound (Part-Talkie); English Intertitles

Modern Love is a 1929 American sound part-talkie comedy film directed by Arch Heath and written by Albert DeMond and Beatrice Van. In addition to sequences with audible dialogue or talking sequences, the film features a synchronized musical score and sound effects along with English intertitles. The soundtrack was recorded using the Western Electric sound-on-film system. The film stars Charley Chase, Kathryn Crawford, Jean Hersholt, Edward Martindel, Anita Garvin and Betty Montgomery. The film was released on July 21, 1929, by Universal Pictures.

== Plot ==
In order to keep her job, a young dress designer must keep her recent marriage a secret from her boss. An important client arrives from Paris and her boss decides to hold a dinner party for the man at the girl's house. When her husband finds out that the client wants to take her back to Paris so she can "study", he comes up with a plan to stop it, and it begins with his being the "server" at the dinner party.

== Cast ==
- Charley Chase as John Jones
- Kathryn Crawford as Patricia Brown
- Jean Hersholt as François Renault
- Edward Martindel as Andre Weston
- Anita Garvin as Mrs. Weston
- Betty Montgomery as The Blonde
- Dorothy Coburn as Half and Half

== See also ==
- List of early sound feature films (1926–1929)
