= The Masked Menace =

1927 film

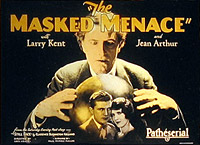
- Film poster
- Directed by: Arch Heath
- Written by: Clarence Budington Kelland
- Starring: Larry Kent; Jean Arthur
- Distributed by: Pathé Exchange
- Release date: October 12, 1927
- Running time: 10 episodes
- Country: United States
- Language: Silent with English intertitles

The Masked Menace is a 1927 American drama film serial directed by Arch Heath and mostly filmed in Berlin, New Hampshire. It was adapted from the story "Still Face" by pulp writer Clarence Budington Kelland and was released in ten chapters. It is now considered to be lost.

== Plot ==
The mill of an old woman and her ward, Faith Newton (Jean Arthur), is being terrorized by the masked menace of the title known as "Still Face". The women are helped by a man named Keats Dodd (Larry Kent). The masked villain's identity is revealed in the final chapter.

== Cast ==
- Larry Kent as Keats Dodd
- Jean Arthur as Faith Newton
- Thomas Holding as Carl Phillips
- Laura Alberta as Grandma Newton
- John F. Hamilton as The Half-Wit named Job
- William Norton Bailey
- Edward Roseman

== See also ==
- List of film serials
- List of film serials by studio
