= The Haunted House (1928 film) =

1928 American film

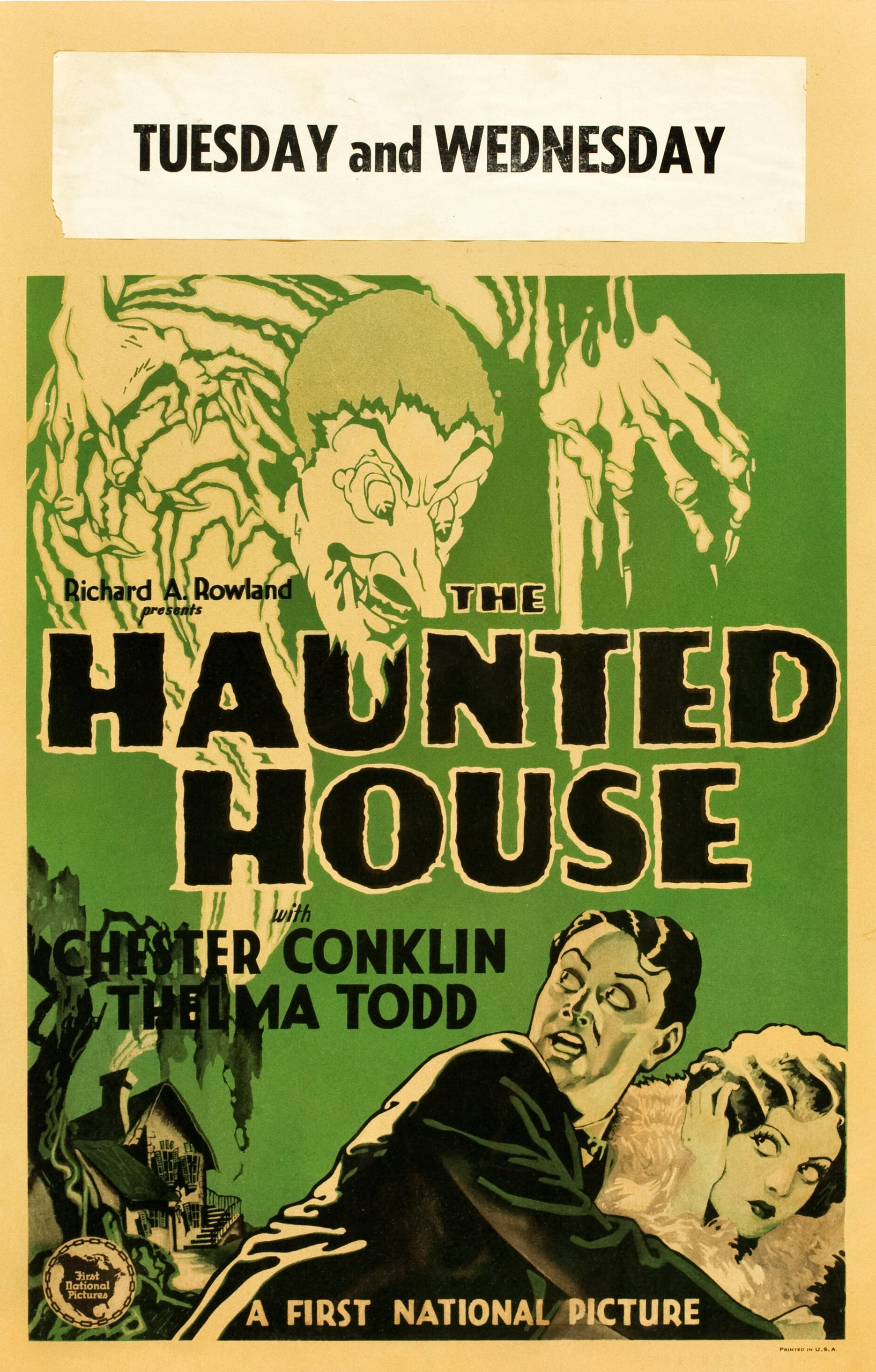
- 1928 Window card advertisement
- Directed by: Benjamin Christensen
- Written by: Lajos Biro; Benjamin Christensen
- Based on: The Haunted House by Owen Davis
- Produced by: Wid Gunning
- Starring: Larry Kent; Thelma Todd
- Cinematography: Sol Polito
- Edited by: Frank Ware
- Production company: First National Pictures
- Distributed by: First National Pictures
- Release date: November 4, 1928
- Running time: 65 minutes
- Country: United States
- Languages: Sound (Synchronized) (English Intertitles)

The Haunted House is a 1928 American mystery film directed by Benjamin Christensen. While the film has no audible dialog, it was released with a synchronized musical score with sound effects using the sound-on-disc Vitaphone process. The film stars Larry Kent and Thelma Todd and is based on Owen Davis's 1926 Broadway play of the same name. The UCLA Film & Television Archive has copies of the Vitaphone sound discs but not the film, which remains lost.

== Plot ==
James Herbert, a wealthy and eccentric old man believed to be on his deathbed, summons his four potential heirs: Billy, a good-natured young man; Tully, a nervous opportunist; Nancy, a gentle and curious relative; and the meddlesome Mrs. Rackham. Each is given sealed instructions—and a stern warning: they must not, under any circumstances, enter the abandoned house on the cliffs overlooking the sea, long rumored to be haunted.

Tempted by the prospect of hidden valuables—particularly a stash of missing bonds—Mrs. Rackham, Tully, and Nancy all ignore the warning and venture into the foreboding house. Billy follows as well, but only to monitor their behavior and see what mischief they might be up to.

Inside the house, a chaotic series of eerie and surreal events begins. Mr. Rackham, dragged along by his domineering wife, quickly regrets entering the spooky mansion. The group is soon confronted by a string of unsettling phenomena: flickering lights, strange moans, and ghostly appearances.

Among the strange characters inside the house are a mysterious and beautiful nurse, a deranged mad doctor, a sleepwalking girl, and a creepy caretaker. Additional confusion is stirred by Jack the Chauffeur, who appears and vanishes at odd moments. The atmosphere grows increasingly dangerous with secret panels revealing masked figures, and suspicious signals from a boat offshore. The mad doctor is locked up—but then escapes—heightening the sense of menace.

Just as events spiral into full-blown hysteria, James Herbert, the supposedly dying man, makes a dramatic reappearance. He reveals that the entire haunting was a carefully orchestrated charade, designed to test the integrity of his would-be heirs. The strange apparitions and threats were all performed by actors he had hired.

In the end, Billy is identified as the only heir who behaved honorably throughout the ordeal. As a reward for his honesty and restraint, he becomes the primary beneficiary of Herbert’s estate. It is also gently suggested that a romantic future may await him with the lovely nurse, who was also part of the elaborate deception.

== Cast ==
- Larry Kent as Billy
- Thelma Todd as The Nurse
- Edmund Breese as Uncle Herbert
- Sidney Bracey as Tully
- Barbara Bedford as Nancy
- Flora Finch as Mrs.Rackham
- Chester Conklin as Mr. Rackham
- William V. Mong as the Weird Caretaker
- Montagu Love as the Mad Doctor
- Eve Southern as the Sleepwalking Girl
- John Gough as Chauffeur

== Background ==
After the release of Haxan (1922), director Christensen relocated to Hollywood in 1926, where he directed Norma Shearer in The Devil's Circus. The screenplay for The Haunted House was written by Lajos Biro and Benjamin Christensen who used the name Richard Bee. Production started on the film on July 26, 1928. The Haunted House was Christensen's first attempt at using sound in film with the feature containing sound effects and a music score, in addition to Eve Southern mouthing two songs in the film which according to an article in Variety, were added in post-production. Variety also noted that the synchronization of the songs was "badly handled, with the player and the sound always out of kilter and neither starting out for finishing together."

== Release ==
The Haunted House was released on November 4, 1928. The film was released as both a silent feature and a feature with the sound additions.

== Reception ==
From contemporary reviews, Variety felt the film "played legitimately and with no attempt to get a tongue-in-the cheek laugh. It holds every form of sliding panel and rainstorm mystery material, as did the play, but holds it all with deadly seriousness." The review felt overall it was not as "good a film as another recent boogy-man thriller, The Terror." A review in Photoplay commented that the film was "Too much Chester Conklin and not enough mystery" Film Daily praised camera work by Sol Polito, declaring him "a genius on atmospheric effects" concluding that the film had "thrills and laughs" in "abundance" despite "the plot standing still for several reels." The film was reviewed twice in The Film Spectator, with the first reviewer stating that The Haunted House was "a resume of all the mystery thrillers ever done, but it can be heartily recommended as entertaining, since its undoubtedly the best to burst fort in all its horror". The second review found the film to be "a clever picture" with Christensen giving "an eerie quality to his characters, an intelligent treatment of a story that is designed to give brave men goose-flesh and make cowards shriek". Harrison's Reports found the reviewer would be "held in tense suspense. Here and there the action shows some tendency to lag for those that are hard-boiled, but the general public seemed to enjoy it immensely. Children may get scared out of their wits by the mysterious happenings."

== See also ==
- List of early sound feature films (1926–1929)
