= Will Knox =

British singer and songwriter (born 1986)

- Born: William Douglas Burr Knox; 14 January 1986 (age 40); London, United Kingdom
- Occupations: Singer; songwriter
- Instrument: Guitar
- Years active: 2011–present
- Website: will-knox.com

William Douglas Burr Knox (born 14 January 1986) is a British singer and songwriter based in Haarlem, Netherlands. Besides his own repertoire, he is known for his work with, among others, Duncan Laurence and Dotan.

== Biography ==
Knox was born and raised in Hammersmith, West London. At the age of 18, he moved to Boston to study at the Berklee College of Music. After graduating, he initially worked as a singer and songwriter in New York City, but later returned to England.

In the early 2010s, Knox participated in songwriting sessions in the Netherlands with Dutch singer Dotan, contributing to the hit records "Hungry" and "Let the River In" (2014). He subsequently worked with many other Dutch artists and bands, including Anouk, Ilse DeLange, Jennie Lena, Miss Montreal, Sabrina Starke and Within Temptation, and was signed to the Dutch music publisher Pennies from Heaven. In 2017, he moved to Haarlem, Netherlands.

Knox contributed to the lyrics of the 2019 single "Arcade" by Duncan Laurence, whom he had met through Ilse DeLange. Prior to its public release, the song was internally selected by the Dutch broadcaster AVROTROS to represent the Netherlands in the Eurovision Song Contest 2019. "Arcade" went on to win the competition, giving the Netherlands its first Eurovision win since 1975, and became one of the most successful Eurovision Song Contest winning entries on streaming platforms and international charts.

== Discography ==
=== Studio albums ===
Title	Details
The Matador & the Acrobat	Released: 11 November 2009; Label: self-released; Format: CD, LP, digital download, streaming
The River Ink	Released: 16 March 2016; Label: Greytown Recordings; Format: CD, LP, digital download, streaming
Shedding + Blooming	Released: 7 January 2022; Label: self-released; Format: LP, digital download, streaming

== Songwriting discography ==
=== Charting singles ===
Title	Year	Artist	Peak chart positions			Co-written with
Title	Year	Artist	NLD (100)	NLD (40)	BEL (FL)	Co-written with
"Hungry"	2014	Dotan	24	12	5	Dotan Harpenau, Martin Sjølie
"Let the River In"	2014	Dotan	53	31	—	Dotan Harpenau
"Daily"	2017	Vinchenzo	70	36	—	Glen Faria, Willem Lazeroms, Vinchenzo Tahapary
"Curaçao"	2017	Emma Bale	—	—	25	Emma Balemans, Hans Francken
"Gold"	2019	Sam Feldt & Kate Ryan	—	—	27	Milou van Egmond, Dominic Lyttle, Sam Renders
"Arcade"	2019	Duncan Laurence	1	1	2	Wouter Hardy, Duncan de Moor, Joel Sjöö
"Hold On"	2020	Laura Tesoro	—	—	29	Nick Ribbens, Laura Tesoro
"Multicolor"	2022	Son Mieux	24	4	—	Isa Azier, Camiel Meiresonne

=== Eurovision Song Contest entries ===
Year	Country	Song	Artist	Semi-Final		Final		Marcel Bezençon Awards
Year	Country	Song	Artist	Place	Points	Place	Points	Marcel Bezençon Awards
2019	Netherlands	"Arcade"	Duncan Laurence	1	280	1	498	Press Award

==== National selection entries ====
Year	National selection	Song	Artist	Result		Co-written with
Year	National selection	Song	Artist	Place	Points	Co-written with
2015	Die Entscheidungsshow (Switzerland)	"Only Human"	Tiziana	5	—	Nick Banns, Jesse Singer, Chris Soper, Shayna Zaid
2016	Eurosong (Belgium)	"In Our Nature"	Adil Aarab	3	159	Adil Aarab, Joes Brands, Bas Kennis
2025	Eurosong (Belgium)	"Perfectly Imperfect"	Leez	2	144	Philipine Nancy Corporaal, Loek van der Grinten, Lisa van Rossem
