= Against the Rules =

Studio album by Dima Bilan
- Released: 2009
- Recorded: 2007–2009
- Genres: Pop, dance-pop, R&B
- Language: English
- Label: Misterija zvuka

Dima Bilan chronology
Против Правил (2008)	Against the Rules (2009)

Singles from Against The Rules
- 1. "Lonely"

Against The Rules is the fifth album by Russian singer-songwriter Dima Bilan, after winning the Eurovision Song Contest in 2008. It was released in 2009 in Russia and all over Europe.

The album is the English version of his recently released Russian language album Protiv Pravil.

== Track listing ==
Production, writing and vocal production by Jim Beanz except where noted.

1. "Number One Fan"
2. "Believe"
3. "Lonely"
4. "Amnesia" (Production, Vocal Production by Jim Beanz, Written by Ryan Tedder and Jesse McCartney)
5. "Don't Leave"
6. "Circles"
7. "Mistakes"
