= Protiv pravil =

Studio album by Dima Bilan
- Released: June 10, 2008
- Recorded: 2007–2008
- Genre: Pop
- Length: 54:59
- Language: Russian, English, Spanish
- Label: Мистерия Звука

Dima Bilan chronology
| Vremya reka (2006) | Protiv pravil (2008) | Believe (2009) |

Singles from Против Правил
- 1. "Number One Fan" Released: June, 2007; 2. "Горе-зима" Released: January 2008; 3. "Believe" Released: April 2008; 4. "Все в твоих руках" Released: May 2008; 5. "Против правил" Released: June 2008; 6. "Toska" Released: September 2008

Protiv pravil (Russian: Против правил, Against the Rules) is the fourth album by Russian singer-songwriter Dima Bilan, released by Мистерия Звука label on June 10, 2008 in Russia.

== Track listing ==
| # | Title | Latin script | Translation | Length |
|---|---|---|---|---|
| 1 | "Против правил" | Protiv pravil | Against the rules | 3:28 |
| 2 | "Как раньше" | Kak ranshe | As earlier | 4:53 |
| 3 | "Я твой номер один" Russian version of Number one fan | Ya tvoy nomer odin | I'm your number one | 3:09 |
| 4 | "Всё в твоих руках" Russian version of Believe | Vsyo v tvoih rukah | Everything's in your hands | 3:17 |
| 5 | "Тоска" | Toska | Melancholy | 3:45 |
| 6 | "Горе-зима" | Gore-zima | Grief-winter | 4:24 |
| 7 | "Мир" | Mir | World | 3:27 |
| 8 | "Берега (Небеса)" | Berega (Nebesa) | Coasts (Heavens) | 3:51 |
| 9 | "Космос" | Kosmos | Space | 3:51 |
| 10 | "Ртуть" | Rtut | Mercury | 3:24 |
| 11 | "Believe"; Winning song in Eurovision song contest 2008 | | | 3:54 |
| 12 | Secreto"; Spanish version of Believe | | Secret | 3:18 |
| 13 | "Porque aún te amo" | | Because I still love you | 3:30 |
| 14 | "Number one fan" | | | 3:10 |

== DVD Track listing ==
| # | Title |
|---|---|
| 1 | "Believe" video |
| 2 | "Горе-зима" video |
| 3 | "Number one fan" video |
| 4 | "Я твой номер один" video Russian version of Number one fan |
| 5 | Photosession |
