= Stars (Duncan Laurence song) =

Single by Duncan Laurence

from the album Small Town Boy (Deluxe)
- Released: 21 May 2021
- Length: 2:52
- Label: Spark
- Songwriters: Brett McLaughlin; Jordan Garfield; Wouter Hardy; Duncan Laurence
- Producer: Wouter Hardy

Duncan Laurence singles chronology
"Feel Something" (2020)	"Stars" (2021)	"Heaven Is a Hand to Hold" (2021)

"Stars" is a song by Dutch singer Duncan Laurence. It was released for digital download on 21 May 2021 by Spark Records as the sixth single from his debut studio album Small Town Boy. The song was written by Brett McLaughlin, Jordan Garfield, Wouter Hardy and Duncan Laurence.

== Live performance ==
On 21 May 2021, Laurence premiered a pre-recorded live performance of "Stars" as an interval act during the final of the Eurovision Song Contest 2021, held in Rotterdam, the Netherlands on 22 May. He was not able to perform live due to a positive COVID-19 test two days prior.

== Personnel ==
Credits adapted from Tidal.

- Brett McLaughlin – Composer, lyricist
- Duncan Laurence – Composer, lyricist, associated performer, background vocalist, vocals
- Jordan Garfield – Composer, lyricist, background vocalist
- Wouter Hardy – Composer, lyricist, engineer, guitar, mixer, piano, studio personnel, synthesizer programming

== Charts ==
Chart performance for "Stars"
Chart (2021)	Peak position
Netherlands (Single Top 100)	86
UK Singles Downloads (OCC)	89
