= Herbert Johnson (cartoonist) =

American cartoonist

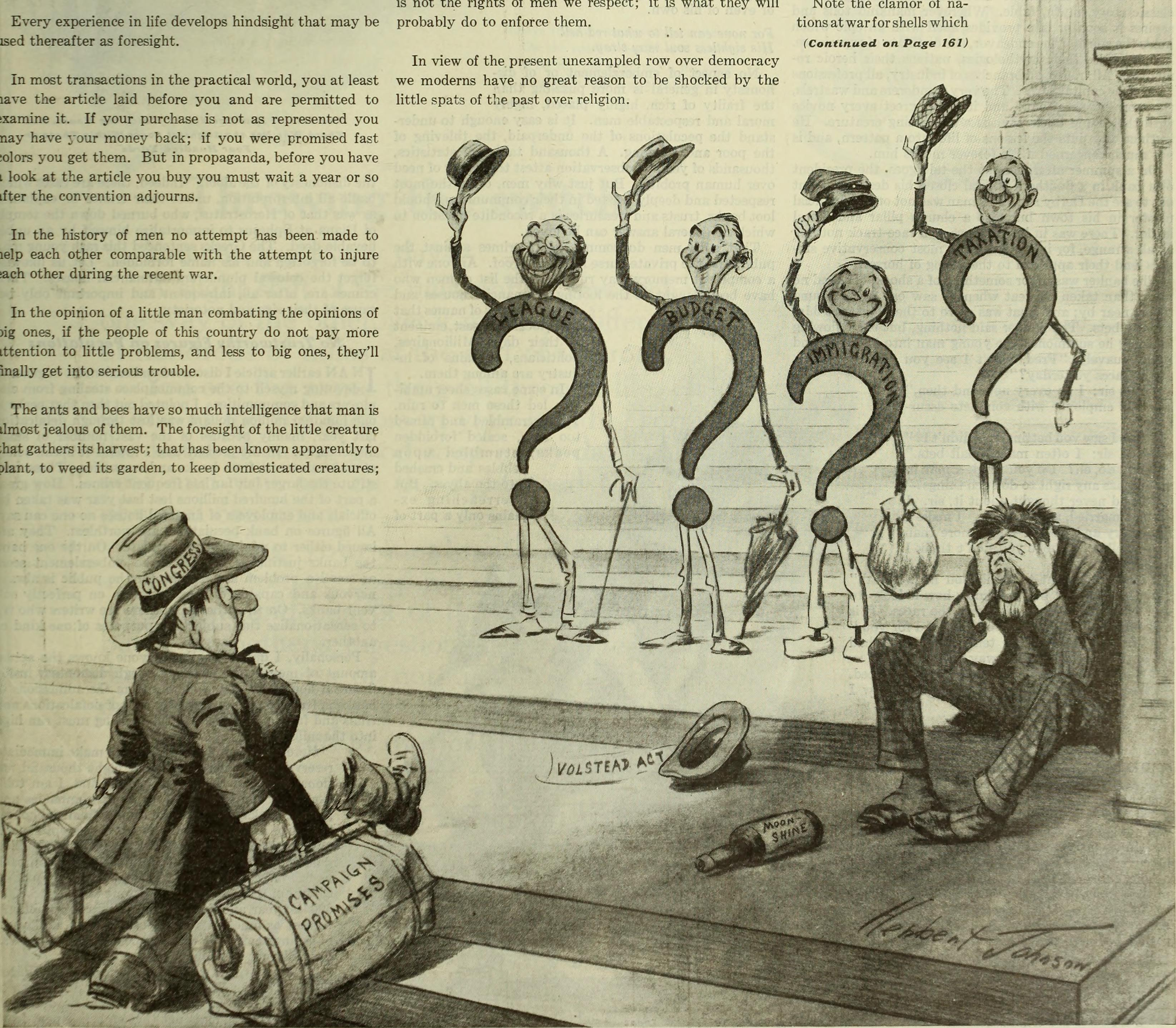
1920 cartoon from the Saturday Evening Post by Herbert Johnson

Herbert Johnson (Oct 30, 1878–Oct 13, 1946) was an American cartoonist. He drew political cartoons in the 1910s through 1940s and also cartoon covers for magazines including Saturday Evening Post and Country Gentleman.
