= Duncan Laurence =

Dutch singer (born 1994)

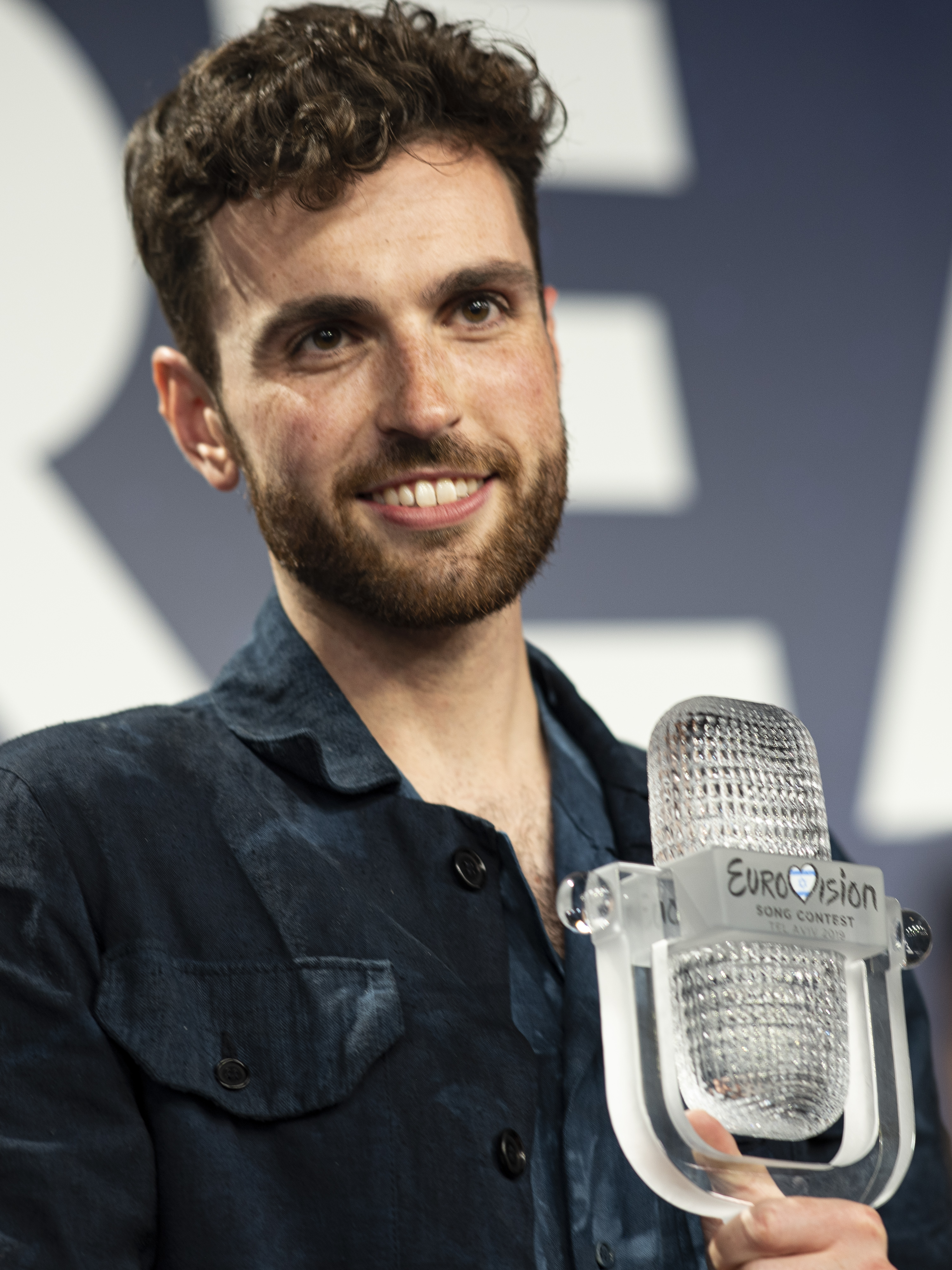
- Laurence with the 2019 Eurovision trophy

Background information
- Born: Duncan de Moor; 11 April 1994 (age 32); Spijkenisse, Netherlands
- Genre: Pop
- Occupations: Singer; songwriter
- Instruments: Vocals; piano
- Years active: 2014–present
- Labels: Epic; Capitol; Universal; Yellowfield; Spark
- Spouse: Jordan Garfield (m. 2023)
- Website: duncanlaurence.nl

Duncan de Moor (Note: Dutch pronunciation: [ˈdʏŋkə(n) də ˈmoːr].) (born 11 April 1994), known professionally as Duncan Laurence, is a Dutch singer and songwriter. He represented the Netherlands in the Eurovision Song Contest 2019 with his song "Arcade" and went on to win the competition, giving the Netherlands its first Eurovision win since 1975. "Arcade" became one of the most successful Eurovision Song Contest winning entries on streaming platforms and international charts in recent history. Prior to Eurovision, Laurence was a semi-finalist in the fifth season of The Voice of Holland.

== Career ==
=== Early life and career ===
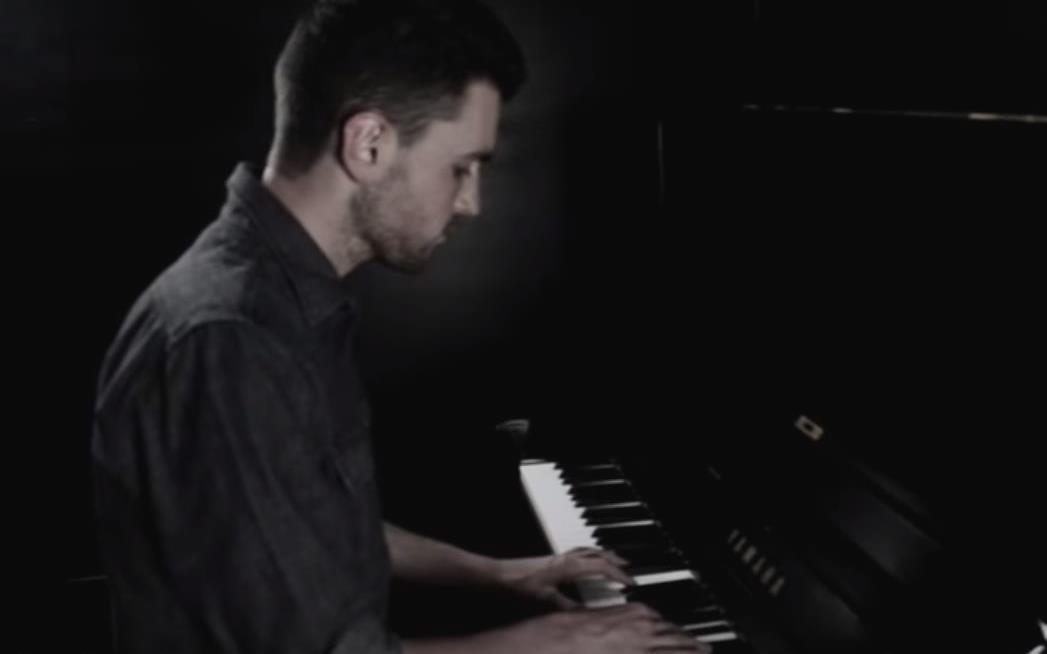
Laurence during his time at the Rock Academy in Tilburg in 2014.

Born in Spijkenisse, Laurence grew up in Hellevoetsluis. He began writing his own songs as a teenager, as an escape from being bullied. He started his musical career at the Rock Academy in Tilburg, playing in a number of school bands, including his own, The Slick and Suited. Formed in 2013, the band went on to perform at Eurosonic Noorderslag. In February 2020, he revealed that he had oxygen deprivation at birth, and thus has had a motor disorder affect his right hand.

=== 2014–2018: The Voice of Holland and independent work ===
Laurence participated in the fifth season of The Voice of Holland, choosing Ilse DeLange as his coach. He advanced to the semi-finals before being eliminated. In March 2016, he left The Slick. Laurence graduated from the Rock Academy in 2017. He, with Jihad Rahmouni, wrote the music to K-pop duo TVXQ's song "Closer" for their 2018 album New Chapter #1: The Chance of Love.

The Voice of Holland performances and results
Round	Song	Original artist	Result
Blind Audition	"Sing"	Ed Sheeran	Joined Team Ilse
The Battles	"Love Runs Out"	OneRepublic	Winner
The Clashes	"Streets"	Kensington	Advances
The Clashes	"Impossible"	Shontelle	Advances
Liveshows	"She Wolf (Falling to Pieces)"	David Guetta featuring Sia	Public Choice
Cross Battles / Semi-Finals	"Iris"	Goo Goo Dolls	Eliminated

=== 2019–2021: Eurovision Song Contest, Worlds on Fire and Small Town Boy ===
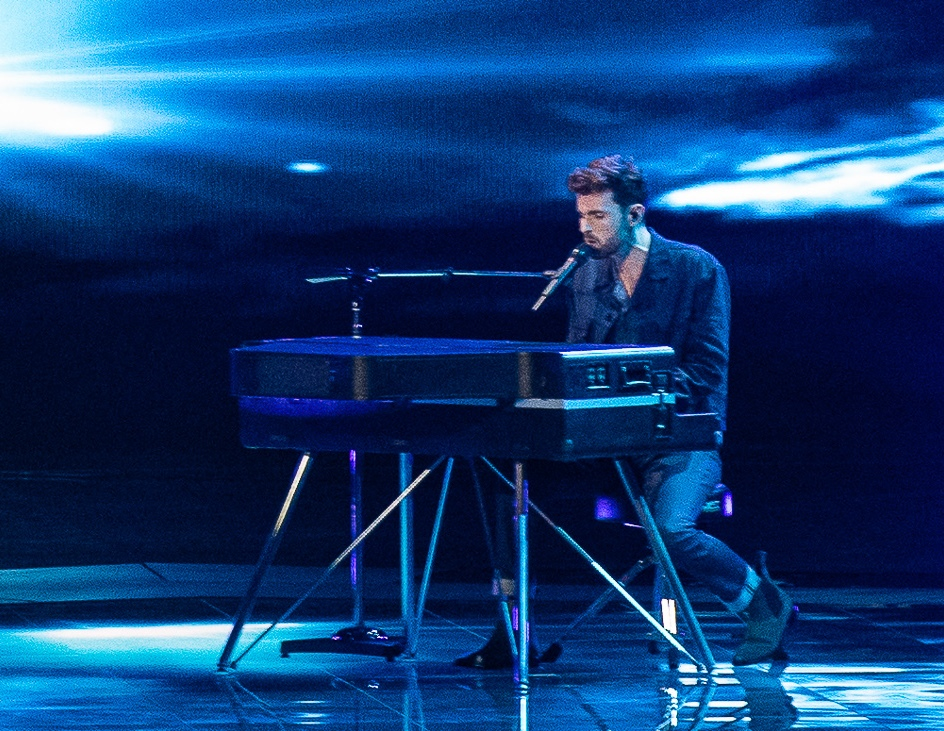
Laurence performing "Arcade" during the second semi-final of the Eurovision Song Contest 2019.

In January 2019, Laurence was internally selected to represent the Netherlands in the Eurovision Song Contest 2019, held in Tel Aviv, Israel. He was nominated by DeLange, with whom he remained in contact after The Voice. His song, "Arcade", was released in March 2019. Arriving as the main favourite to win, Laurence eventually went on to win the contest, having received a total of 498 points. He is the fifth Dutch entrant to win the competition, and the first since Teach-In won the Eurovision Song Contest 1975 with the song "Ding-a-dong". As a result of the following year's contest being cancelled due to the COVID-19 pandemic, Laurence is the longest reigning Eurovision winner, having held the title for two consecutive years.

After his Eurovision victory, Laurence embarked on a concert tour across the Netherlands and Europe. On 10 June 2019, he performed at the 50th anniversary of Pinkpop Festival in Landgraaf, the first Dutch Eurovision winner to perform at the event. He replaced the Swedish duo First Aid Kit who dropped out for health reasons. On 23 October 2019, Laurence released his second single, "Love Don't Hate It". It was also announced that he signed a recording contract with Capitol Records. In 2020, the artists' entrance at Rotterdam Ahoy was renamed "Door Duncan" in his honour. On 13 May 2020, Laurence released his first extended play (EP), Worlds on Fire, which included the singles "Arcade", "Love Don't Hate It", and "Someone Else", along with two new tracks. His first studio album, Small Town Boy, followed on 13 November 2020. It was certified platinum in the Netherlands three days after its release. The album's release was preceded by "Feel Something", a collaboration with fellow Dutch DJ Armin van Buuren.

In the second half of 2020, "Arcade" went viral on video sharing service TikTok, resulting in the song's new chart success and rise in streams on various platforms. In January 2021, "Arcade" became the most-streamed Eurovision song on Spotify, surpassing a record previously held by Eurovision 2019 runner-up Mahmood and his entry "Soldi". On 12 February 2021, "Arcade" reached the UK Singles Chart's top 40, and two weeks later it peaked at number 29. In March, Laurence made his US television debut performing "Arcade" on Today, and later also performed the song's duet version alongside Fletcher on The Ellen DeGeneres Show. Following these promotional appearances, the song broke into the US Billboard Hot 100 chart, becoming the first Eurovision song in 25 years and the first Eurovision winning song in 45 years to do so; it eventually peaked at number 30.

At the Eurovision Song Contest 2021 held in Rotterdam, Laurence opened the first semi-final with "Feel Something". In the same event, he was awarded a Global Platinum record for one billion streams of "Arcade". However, he later tested positive for COVID-19, which prevented him from performing live in the grand final. Pre-recorded footage of his performance, consisting of "Arcade" and a new single from Small Town Boy's deluxe edition, "Stars", was broadcast instead during the final.

On 11 June 2021, the soundtrack album for the second season of the Hulu series Love, Victor was released. Among the artists featured on the soundtrack was Laurence with "Heaven Is a Hand to Hold", which he co-wrote with Leland, Jordan Garfield and Peter Thomas. Laurence also features on American singer Wrabel's single "Back to Back", which was released on 30 July off of the latter's debut album These Words Are All for You. "Wishes Come True", a standalone Christmas single, followed on 26 November.

=== 2022–present: Skyboy ===
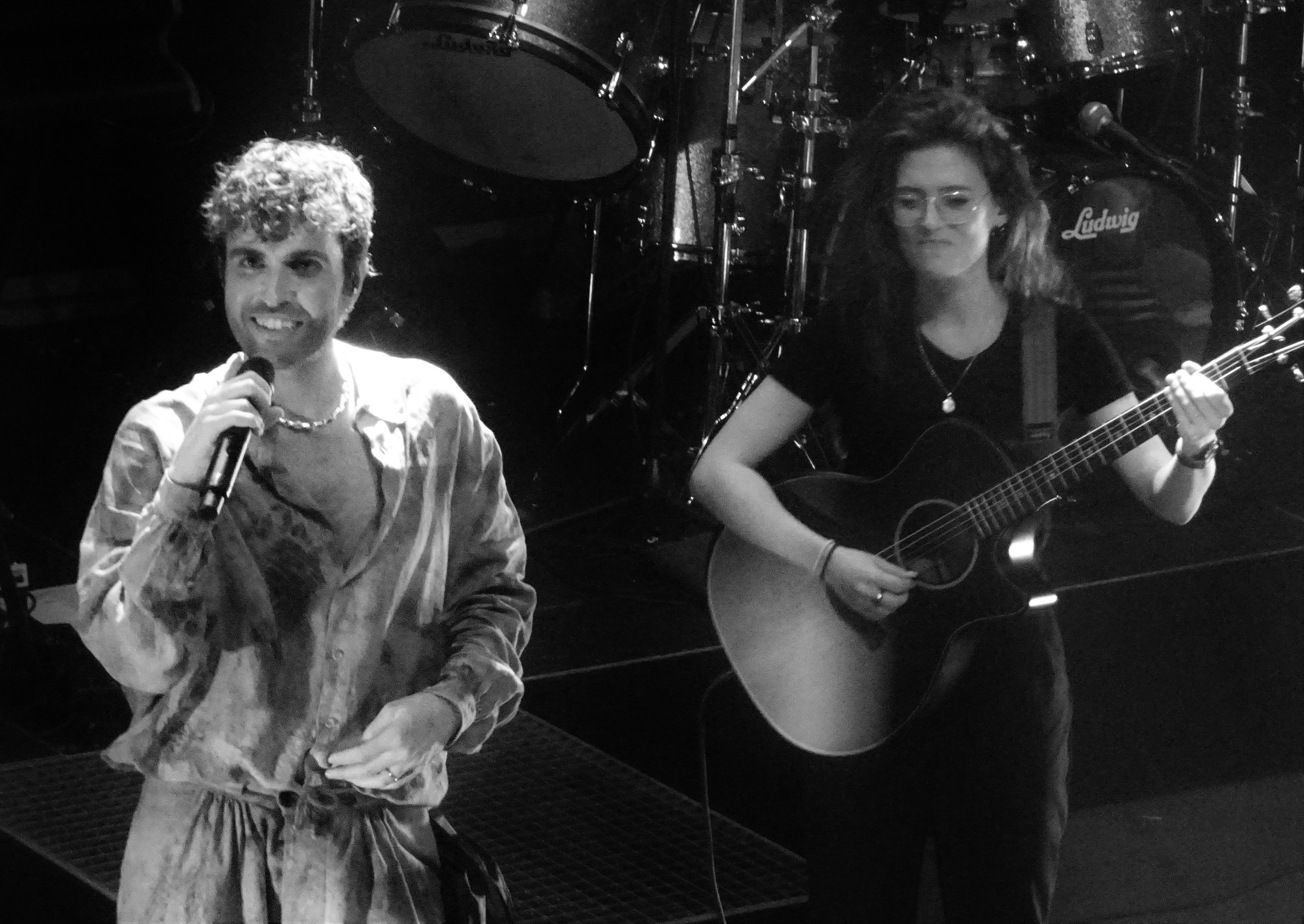
Laurence and guitarist Carlota Lopez van de Logt

In early 2022, Laurence served as a coach on the sixth season of The Voice Kids Belgium, where a member of his team, Karista, won.

On 3 August 2022, Laurence released "Electric Life", which serves as the lead single of his forthcoming second studio album Skyboy. A collaborative single with Rosa Linn, "WDIA (Would Do It Again)", followed on 21 October. Further singles include "I Want It All" in November 2022, "Skyboy" in March 2023, and "Anything" and "Rest in Peace" in August 2023. He co-wrote the Dutch entry for the Eurovision Song Contest 2023, "Burning Daylight", performed by Mia Nicolai and Dion Cooper. Also in the final of that year's Eurovision, he performed a cover of "You'll Never Walk Alone" as an interval act.

Skyboy was released on 22 September 2023. De Volkskrant gave the album a four-star rating, saying: "'Skyboy' by Duncan Laurence, recorded in Los Angeles, is bursting with variety. The power ballad clichés are now counterbalanced by gems of melody and (vocal) harmony."

== Musical influences ==
In a brief interview, Laurence cited Coldplay, Snow Patrol, Ryan Tedder, Sia, Sam Smith and Adele as influences.

== Personal life ==
Laurence came out as bisexual in 2016, which he addressed publicly in an Instagram post in October 2018. During a press conference shortly before the Eurovision final, he affirmed his sexuality: "I am more than just an artist, I am a person, I am a living being, I'm bisexual, I'm a musician, I stand for things. And I'm proud that I get the chance to show what I am, who I am." He announced his marriage to American songwriter Jordan Garfield on 21 August 2023.

== Discography ==
=== Studio albums ===
Title	Details	Peak chart positions			Certifications
Title	Details	NL	BEL (FL)	US Heat.	Certifications
Small Town Boy	Released: 13 November 2020; Label: Spark; Format: CD, cassette, vinyl, digital download, streaming	6	94	8	NVPI: Platinum
Skyboy	Released: 22 September 2023; Label: Yellowfield; Format: CD, vinyl, digital download, streaming	41	—	—	

=== Extended plays ===
Title	Details	Peak chart positions	
Title	Details	NL	US Heat.
Worlds on Fire	Released: 13 May 2020; Label: Spark; Format: Digital download, streaming, vinyl	60	12

=== Singles ===
==== As lead artist ====
Title	Year	Peak chart positions										Certifications	Album
Title	Year	NL	BEL (FL)	BEL (WA)	CAN	GER	IRE	NOR	SWE	UK	US	Certifications	Album
"Arcade"	2019	1	2	31	45	26	23	10	6	29	30	NVPI: 4× Platinum; BEA: Platinum; BPI: Platinum; GLF: Gold; IFPI NOR: Gold; MC: Platinum; RIAA: Platinum	Small Town Boy
"Love Don't Hate It"	2019	41	53	—	—	—	—	—	—	—	—	NVPI: Gold	Small Town Boy
"Someone Else"	2020	72	86	93	—	—	—	—	—	—	—		Small Town Boy
"Last Night"	2020	—	—	—	—	—	—	—	—	—	—		Small Town Boy
"Stars"	2021	86	—	—	—	—	—	—	—	— (Note: "Stars" did not enter the UK Singles Chart, but peaked at number 89 on the UK Singles Downloads Chart.)	—		Small Town Boy (Deluxe)
"Wishes Come True"	2021	—	—	—	—	—	—	—	—	—	—		Non-album singles
"Take My Breath Away"	2022	—	—	—	—	—	—	—	—	—	—		Non-album singles
"Electric Life"	2022	79	—	—	—	—	—	—	—	—	—		Skyboy
"WDIA (Would Do It Again)" (with Rosa Linn)	2022	—	—	—	—	—	—	—	—	—	—		Non-album single
"I Want It All"	2022	—	—	—	—	—	—	—	—	—	—		Skyboy
"Skyboy"	2023	— (Note: "Skyboy" did not enter the Dutch Single Top 100, but peaked at number four on the Single Tip chart.)	—	—	—	—	—	—	—	—	—		Skyboy
"You'll Never Walk Alone"	2023	—	—	—	—	—	—	—	—	—	—		Non-album single
"Anything"	2023	—	—	—	—	—	—	—	—	—	—		Skyboy
"Rest in Peace"	2023	—	—	—	—	—	—	—	—	—	—		Skyboy
"I Do"	2023	— (Note: "I Do" did not enter the Dutch Single Top 100, but peaked at number four on the Single Tip chart.)	—	—	—	—	—	—	—	—	—		Non-album single
"Feel Your Love (Rapture)" (with Tanishk Bagchi)	2024	—	—	—	—	—	—	—	—	—	—		
"—" denotes a recording that did not chart or was not released in that territory.

==== As featured artist ====
Title	Year	Peak chart positions		Album or EP
Title	Year	NL	BEL (FL)	Album or EP
"Feel Something" (Armin van Buuren featuring Duncan Laurence)	2020	85	78	Small Town Boy and Euthymia
"Back to Back" (Wrabel featuring Duncan Laurence)	2021	—	—	These Words Are All for You

=== Non-single album appearances ===
Title	Year	Album
"Laat gaan" (Sjors van der Panne featuring Duncan de Moor)	2017	Met Elkaar

=== Soundtrack appearances ===
Appearances by Duncan Laurence on soundtrack albums
Title	Year	Album
"Heaven Is a Hand to Hold"	2021	Love, Victor: Season 2

== Songwriting discography ==
Title	Year	Artist	Peak chart positions			Co-written with
Title	Year	Artist	NL	BEL (FL)	BEL (WA)	Co-written with
"Going On"	2019	Henri PFR featuring Soran	—	29	26	Laurell Barker; Soran Dussaigne; Kiris Houston; Henri Peiffer
"Courage in Tomorrow"	2019	Adil	—	—	—	Adil Aarab; Abdelkariem Asselman
"Silhouette"	2022	Gjon's Tears	—	—	—	Jordan Garfield; Ashley Hicklin; Gjon Muharremaj; Mikołaj Trybulec; François Welgryn
"Know"	2022	Dion Cooper	—	—	—	Dion Cuiper; Jordan Garfield; Loek van der Grinten; Wouter Hardy
"Blue Jeans"	2022	Dion Cooper	—	—	—	Dion Cuiper; Jordan Garfield; Loek van der Grinten
"Burning Daylight"	2023	Mia Nicolai and Dion Cooper	42	—	—	Dion Cuiper; Jordan Garfield; Michaja Nicolaï; Loek van der Grinten

== Awards and nominations ==
Award	Year	Nominated work	Category	Result	Ref.
Eurovision Song Contest	2019	"Arcade"	—N/a	First	
Marcel Bezençon Awards	2019	"Arcade"	Press Award	Won	
Edison Award	2020	Himself	Best Newcomer	Nominated	
Edison Award	2020	"Arcade"	Best Song	Won	
Edison Award	2020	"Arcade"	Best Video Clip	Nominated	
NRJ Music Award	2021	Himself	International Revelation of the Year	Nominated	

== Notes ==
Awards and achievements
Preceded by Waylon with "Outlaw in 'Em"	Netherlands in the Eurovision Song Contest; 2019	Succeeded by Jeangu Macrooy with "Grow"
Preceded by (Israel) Netta with "Toy"	Winner of the Eurovision Song Contest; 2019	Succeeded by (Italy) Måneskin with "Zitti e buoni" (2021)
