= Wouter Hardy =

Dutch musician, songwriter and producer

- Also known as: Hrdy
- Born: 3 April 1991 (age 35); Boxtel, Netherlands
- Genre: Pop music
- Occupations: Composer; songwriter; producer
- Instruments: Trumpet; piano; keyboard
- Years active: 2013–present
- Label: Sony Music Publishing
- Website: wouterhardy.com hrdy.nl

Wouter Hardy (Dutch: [ˈʋʌutər ˈɦɑrdi]; born 3 April 1991), also known by his stage name Hrdy (stylised in all caps), is a Dutch musician, songwriter and producer. He is known for his work with, among others, Duncan Laurence, Gjon's Tears and Alika Milova.

== Career ==
Hardy was born and raised in Boxtel, North Brabant. After graduating from the Rock City Institute in Eindhoven, he moved to Rotterdam to study at the Codarts University for the Arts. During his studies, he joined the band of Sharon Kovacs, with whom he toured through Europe until 2016.

In late 2016, Hardy met Duncan Laurence through Sony Music Publishing. Together, they worked on the song "Arcade" for two years. Prior to its public release, the song was internally selected by the Dutch broadcaster AVROTROS to represent the Netherlands in the Eurovision Song Contest 2019. "Arcade" went on to win the competition, giving the Netherlands its first Eurovision win since 1975, and became one of the most successful Eurovision Song Contest winning entries on streaming platforms and international charts in recent history.

Following the cancellation of the Eurovision Song Contest 2020, Hardy was invited to participate in a songwriting camp in Zürich to help write a new song for the Swiss representative Gjon's Tears for the 2021 edition. Together with Gjon's Tears and the Belgian songwriter Nina Sampermans, he wrote the song "Ground Zero", which was later translated into French as "Tout l'univers". Out of five finalists, a professional jury ultimately chose this song to represent Switzerland in the Eurovision Song Contest 2021. At Eurovision, the entry finished in third place with 432 points, Switzerland's best placement since 1993.

In December 2022, it was announced that Hardy and Sampermans will be participating in the 2023 edition of Eesti Laul, the Estonian national selection for the Eurovision Song Contest, as co-writers of the entry "Bridges" by Alika. "Bridges" eventually won the competition and thus became the Estonian entry for the 2023 contest, where it finished in eighth place with 168 points.

== Discography ==
=== Extended plays ===
Title	Details
Lockdown EP	Released: 27 August 2021; Label: HRDY Records / B-Kube Music; Format: Streaming
Making Memories EP	Released: 3 June 2022; Label: HRDY Records / B-Kube Music; Format: Streaming

=== Singles ===
Title	Year	Album
"A New Dawn"	2021	Lockdown EP
"Brother"	2021	Lockdown EP
"Sunday"	2021	Lockdown EP
"Forgiven"	2021	Lockdown EP
"Making Memories"	2021	Making Memories EP
"Me and My Piano"	2021	Making Memories EP
"Empty"	2022	Making Memories EP
"Dad"	2022	Making Memories EP

== Songwriting discography ==
Title	Year	Artist	Co-written with
"Arcade"	2019	Duncan Laurence	Duncan de Moor, Will Knox, Joel Sjöö
"Caroline"	2020	Nambyar	Jesse Nambiar, Joel Sjöö, Morien van der Tang
"Tout l'univers"	2021	Gjon's Tears	Gjon Muharremaj, Xavier Michel, Nina Sampermans
"Long Night"	2021	Ola	Olamide Polet, Nina Sampermans
"Snow in New York"	2021	Cheryl van Tricht	—
"Wasted Time"	2021	Charles	Charlotte Foret, Nina Sampermans
"Riddle"	2021	Charles	Charlotte Foret, Nina Sampermans
"Without You"	2021	Charles	Charlotte Foret, Nina Sampermans
"The Fall"	2021	Charles	Charlotte Foret, Nina Sampermans
"Far Gone"	2021	Charles	Charlotte Foret, Nina Sampermans
"He Knows"	2021	Charles	Charlotte Foret, Nina Sampermans
"Stars"	2021	Duncan Laurence	Duncan de Moor, Jordan Garfield, Brett McLaughlin
"Alright"	2021	Hanin al Kadamani	Hanin al Kadamani, Amber Gomaa, Billie Maluw
"Er is nog zo veel"	2021	Stef Bos, Lucas Hamming and Friday	—
"Als jij maar bij me bent"	2022	Meau	Meau Hewitt
"Half a World Away"	2022	Remme feat. Clara Mae	Remme ter Haar, Clara Hagman, Isa Azier
"Know"	2022	Dion Cooper	Dion Cooper, Jordan Garfield, Loek van der Grinten, Duncan de Moor
"Bridges"	2022	Alika	Alika Milova, Nina Sampermans
"Skyboy"	2023	Duncan Laurence	Duncan de Moor, Jordan Garfield

=== Eurovision Song Contest entries ===
Year	Country	Song	Artist	Semi-final		Final	
Year	Country	Song	Artist	Place	Points	Place	Points
2019	Netherlands	"Arcade"	Duncan Laurence	1	280	1	498
2021	Switzerland	"Tout l'univers"	Gjon's Tears	1	291	3	432
2023	Estonia	"Bridges"	Alika	10	74	8	168
