= Rush! World Tour =

2023 concert tour by Måneskin

- Tour by Måneskin
- Official tour poster
- Associated album: Rush!
- Start date: 3 September 2023, Hanover, Germany
- End date: 19 December 2023, Manchester, United Kingdom
- Legs: 6
- No. of shows: 30 in total

The Rush! World Tour was the third concert tour by the Italian rock band Måneskin, in support of their third studio album, Rush! (2023). It ran for six legs, starting on 3 September 2023 in Hanover, Germany, and concluding on 19 December in Manchester, United Kingdom.

== Context ==
Måneskin released their third studio album Rush! on 20 January 2023. They announced the Rush! World Tour while embarking on their worldwide Loud Kids Tour Gets Louder tour, which supported both Rush! and its predecessor Teatro d'ira: Vol. I (2021). The tour began on 3 September 2023, at the Expo Plaza in Hanover, Germany, and concluded on 19 December, at Manchester Arena in Manchester, United Kingdom.

== Setlist ==
1. Don't Wanna Sleep
2. Gossip
3. Zitti e buoni
4. Honey (Are U Coming?)
5. Supermodel
6. Coraline
7. Beggin'
8. The Driver
9. For Your Love
10. Valentine
11. Gasoline
12. Timezone
13. Trastevere
14. I Wanna Be Your Slave
15. Mammamia
16. Humble (Kendrick Lamar cover)
17. Off My Face
18. In nome del padre
19. Bla Bla Bla
20. Kool Kids
21. The Loneliest
22. I Wanna Be Your Slave (encore)

== Shows ==
Date (Note: All dates listed are in the year 2023.)	City	Country	Venue
Leg 1 — Europe
3 September	Hanover	Germany	EXPO Plaza
6 September	Nancy	France	Nancy Open Air
Leg 2 — North America
21 September	New York	United States	Madison Square Garden
23 September	Columbia	United States	Merriweather Post Pavilion
25 September	Boston	United States	TD Garden
27 September	Toronto	Canada	Scotiabank Arena
29 September	Chicago	United States	Allstate Arena
1 October	Detroit	United States	Michigan Lottery Amphitheatre
3 October	Nashville	United States	Nashville Municipal Auditorium
6 October	Irving	United States	The Pavillion at Toyota Music Factory
10 October	Los Angeles	United States	Kia Forum
13 October	Oakland	United States	Oakland Arena
15 October	Vancouver	Canada	Thunderbird Sports Centre
20 October	Mexico City	Mexico	Palacio de los Deportes
Leg 3 — South America
24 October	Bogotá	Colombia	Movistar Arena
27 October	Santiago	Chile	Estadio Bicentenario de La Florida
29 October	Buenos Aires	Argentina	Movistar Arena
1 November	Rio de Janeiro	Brazil	Qualistage
3 November	São Paulo	Brazil	Espaço Unimed
Leg 4 — Oceania
20 November	Brisbane	Australia	Brisbane Convention & Exhibition Centre
22 November	Sydney	Australia	Hordern Pavillion
23 November	Melbourne	Australia	Margaret Court Arena
25 November	Adelaide	Australia	AEC Theatre
Leg 5 — Asia
27 November	Singapore		Singapore Expo
2 December	Tokyo	Japan	Ariake Arena
3 December	Tokyo	Japan	Ariake Arena
5 December	Tokyo	Japan	Garden Theatre
7 December	Kōbe	Japan	World Memorial Hall
Leg 6 — Europe
14 December	Dublin	(Republic of Ireland) Ireland	3Arena
19 December	Manchester	United Kingdom	Manchester Arena

== Personnel ==
- Damiano David — vocals
- Victoria De Angelis — bass
- Thomas Raggi — electric guitar, acoustic guitar
- Ethan Torchio — drums, acoustic guitar (in Trastevere)
