= Rush! =

2023 studio album by Måneskin

- Standard edition cover

Studio album by Måneskin
- Released: 20 January 2023
- Studios: Perfect Sound, Los Angeles; MXM, Los Angeles; Forum, Rome; Alari Park Studios, Milan; House Mouse Studios, Stockholm; Mulino Recording, Acquapendente; WhiteStudio 2.0, Milan
- Genres: Pop rock; hard rock
- Length: 52:42
- Languages: English; Italian
- Labels: Epic; Sony
- Producers: Captain Cuts; Fabrizio Ferraguzzo; LostBoy; Måneskin; Mattman & Robin; Max Martin; Rami Yacoub; Sly

Måneskin chronology
Teatro d'ira: Vol. I (2021)	Rush! (2023)

Singles from Rush!
- 1. "Mammamia" Released: 8 October 2021; 2. "Supermodel" Released: 13 May 2022; 3. "The Loneliest" Released: 7 October 2022; 4. "Gossip" Released: 13 January 2023; 5. "Baby Said" Released: 3 March 2023

Singles from Rush! (Are U Coming?)
- 1. "Honey (Are U Coming?)" Released: 1 September 2023; 2. "Valentine" Released: 17 November 2023

Rush! is the third studio album by Italian rock band Måneskin, released on 20 January 2023 through Epic Records and Sony Music. It was co-written and partly co-produced by all four members of Måneskin—Damiano David, Victoria De Angelis, Thomas Raggi, and Ethan Torchio—alongside a group of collaborators including Captain Cuts, Fabrizio Ferraguzzo, LostBoy, Mattman & Robin, Max Martin, Rami Yacoub, and Sly. Rush! is primarily a pop rock and hard rock record, labeled as their debut international album, blending both English and Italian.

Rush! was supported by the release of five singles. "Mammamia" was released as the album's lead single in 2021. "Supermodel" and "The Loneliest" followed in 2022, with the latter becoming Måneskin's second number-one song in their native Italy. The fourth and fifth singles, "Gossip" and "Baby Said" respectively, were released in 2023. To promote Rush! and its predecessor Teatro d'ira: Vol. I (2021), Måneskin embarked on the Loud Kids Tour and the Rush! World Tour throughout 2022 and 2023. A reissue of the album, titled Rush! (Are U Coming?), was released on 10 November 2023 and supported by the singles "Honey (Are U Coming?)" and "Valentine".

Upon its release, Rush! divided music critics. The album topped the charts in Austria, Belgium, the Czech Republic, France, Greece, Hungary, Italy, Latvia, Lithuania, the Netherlands, Portugal, Slovakia, and Switzerland. It also reached the top five on the UK Albums Chart and the top 20 on the US Billboard 200.

== Background and recording ==
Måneskin recorded "probably 50" songs for the album, which they recorded in part in Los Angeles with producer Max Martin. The band revealed that they had been working on their "debut international album" with Martin and the MXM and Wolf Cousins team, including Savan Kotecha and Mattman & Robin, extensively after meeting them the previous year. The single "Supermodel", which was worked on with Martin and Rami Yacoub, was premiered live during the final of the Eurovision Song Contest 2022. The band later teased a song on the album called "Gasoline", written in support of Ukraine after the 2022 Russian invasion, also made by the team. They were also influenced during the writing and recording process after listening to Radiohead, with bassist Victoria De Angelis stating that Måneskin had "tried to experiment a bit more with [their] sound. We listened to a lot of Radiohead where they work a lot with pedals." Frontman Damiano David said: "I think that the inspiration we got from Radiohead was to be very focused on creating a very specific world for each song. It's something they do very, very well so we tried to create these amazing atmospheres. They really create an image of what you're listening to, and that gave us inspiration."

The band announced the album on 31 October 2022, and later shared its track listing on 15 December. The album is composed of fourteen tracks in English and three in Italian, including the band's concert staple and "fan favourite" track "Gasoline", as well as another song they debuted in concert, "Kool Kids". In an interview with Entertainment Weekly, David explained the inclusion of the Italian tracks:

"Because we feel like the Italian music part is such a strong part of us and our culture and our background. We didn't want the Italian music to be here and there every once in a while in the tracklist. We wanted to create a block that represents the foundation everything is built around."

== Singles ==
"Mammamia" was released as the album's lead single on 8 October 2021. The second and third singles, "Supermodel" and "The Loneliest", followed in May and October 2022, respectively. The fourth single, "Gossip", was released on 13 January 2023. A promotional single titled "La fine" was released on 16 December 2022.

== Reception ==
Professional ratings
Aggregate scores
Source	Rating
AnyDecentMusic?	6.6/10
Metacritic	65/100
Review scores
Source	Rating
Clash	7/10
The Daily Telegraph	4/5 stars
Evening Standard	4/5 stars
Gigwise	6/10 stars
The Guardian	3/5 stars
The Independent	3/5 stars
The Irish Times	3/5 stars
Kerrang!	4/5
NME	3/5 stars
Pitchfork	2.0/10

At review aggregator Metacritic, which assigns a weighted rating out of 100 to reviews from mainstream critics, Rush! has an average score of 65 based on 16 reviews, indicating "generally favorable" reception. Aggregator AnyDecentMusic? gave it 6.6 out of 10, based on their assessment of the critical consensus. Rho Chung of The Skinny opined that the album "perfectly captures the sense of spontaneous authenticity that makes for a one-of-a-kind show". Writing for Kerrang!, Sam Law felt that the band are "still utterly unstoppable" when they "tap into the youthful exuberance and fiery eccentricity that got them here in the first place". Robin Murray of Clash deemed the album "exhaustive and exhausting" and "the definitive word in this unlikely rock phenomenon – at its best, it's a feral reminder of how entertaining the genre can be". Exclaim! listed the album cover as 4th worst of the year, writing: "Italian rock pervs Måneskin specialize in making songs about sex sound as sterile and clumsy as possible, so it's only fitting that their album cover shows them ogling up the skirt of what appears to be a gigantic preteen. Yuck."

Rolling Stone's David Browne found that "the ridiculousness of most of Rush!" is a demonstration of how Måneskin "only manage to confirm how hard rock & roll has to work these days to be noticed". Calling the project the "broadest stroke" of the band, Browne appreciated Max Martin's production, who "knows his way around a hook", and the revival of the "deadpan, half-spoken new-wave novelty". Alexis Petridis, reviewing the album for The Guardian, wrote that Måneskin capture their influences and make them "genuinely coherent" on the project, with an "oddly guileless" result. Petridis noted that what the project lacks is made up for with "enthusiasm" and "If that enthusiasm occasionally tips over into a cloying eagerness to please, more often it's infectious". Annabel Nugent of The Independent found that over the course of the album it is difficult to get a moment "where you don't have some fun", finding that nevertheless on first listen it sounds "amorphous".

Lauren Murphy of The Irish Times wrote that "as a collection of surface-level, toe-tappy rock songs", the album is "more than serviceable", calling it a "a bid to secure Måneskin's foothold in foreign territories" with "slick English-language affairs", although "lyrically uninventive". Murphy noted that on the album the band seems aware "that we'd never have heard of them if not for the profile afforded them by Eurovision". Reviewing the album for The Atlantic, Spencer Kornhaber was not impressed with Rush! compared to the band's previous efforts, writing that it "does not make a very strong case that the band's appeal is its music". Kornhaber pointed out that "the album's redundancy has the odd effect of calling into question the guitars are back! narrative that the band seemingly invites", labelling the songs "plainly recycled" and "brazenly mediocre". Jeremy D. Larson of Pitchfork dismissed the album, calling it "absolutely terrible at every conceivable level: vocally grating, lyrically unimaginative, and musically one-dimensional. It is a rock album that sounds worse the louder you play it."

Sarah Taylor of Gigwise judged the band to be "playing it safe with the lyrics on this record, exaggerating up their rebel aesthetic, and compromising the lyrical beauty of earlier tracks like 'Torna a casa' and 'Coraline'", suggesting that "some of their songs are all style and no substance". Taylor noted that the three tracks sung in Italian are some of "the most frenetic and thrilling" on the record. Conversely, Italian music critics noted that the Italian-language tracks are the least musically and lyrically functional.

Claudio Cabona of Rockol described the project as a "pop-rock playlist that tends to repeat itself", pointing out "the band's tendency to make its own the styles, clichés, and sounds of a rock that has already been heard". He felt that the band's young audience will welcome the record as it "has no definite footholds and references [...] because they haven't experienced it". Claudio Todesco of Rolling Stone Italia noted that the futility of trying to analyse the album, as "you end up criticizing the substantial lack of an original musical language, the lack of charm, the absence of high-level creativity", finding that even if the band "didn't do anything new, they did it at the right time" because "they understand rock as a living body, not an excellent corpse to be watched over".

== Track listing ==
Rush! track listing
No.	Title	Lyrics	Music	Producer(s)	Length
1.	"Own My Mind"	Måneskin; Nate Cyphert	Måneskin; Benjamin Berger; Ryan Rabin	Måneskin; Fabrizio Ferraguzzo; Enrico Brun^{[c]}	3:11
2.	"Gossip" (featuring Tom Morello)	Måneskin; Madison Love	Måneskin; Joseph Janiak	Måneskin; Ferraguzzo; Brun^{[c]}	2:48
3.	"Timezone"	Måneskin; Justin Tranter	Måneskin; Rami Yacoub; Sylvester Sivertsen	Sly^{[p]}; Yacoub^{[p]}	2:59
4.	"Bla Bla Bla"	Måneskin; Pablo Bowman	Måneskin; Peter Rycroft	Måneskin; Ferraguzzo; Brun^{[c]}	3:04
5.	"Baby Said"	Måneskin; Tranter	Måneskin; Yacoub; Max Martin; Sivertsen	Sly^{[p]}; Yacoub^{[p]}	2:44
6.	"Gasoline"	Måneskin; Tranter	Måneskin; Yacoub; Sivertsen	Sly^{[p]}; Yacoub^{[p]}	3:41
7.	"Feel"	Måneskin; Savan Kotecha	Måneskin; Mattias Larsson; Robin Fredriksson	Mattman & Robin	2:47
8.	"Don't Wanna Sleep"	Måneskin; Tranter	Måneskin; Yacoub; Martin; Sivertsen	Sly^{[p]}; Yacoub^{[p]}	2:36
9.	"Kool Kids"	Måneskin	Måneskin	Måneskin; Ferraguzzo	2:43
10.	"If Not for You"	Måneskin; Kotecha	Måneskin; Martin; Yacoub; Sivertsen	Sly^{[p]}; Yacoub^{[p]}; Martin	3:14
11.	"Read Your Diary"	Måneskin; Tranter	Måneskin; Yacoub; Sivertsen	Sly^{[p]}; Yacoub^{[p]}; Martin	2:30
12.	"Mark Chapman"	Måneskin	Måneskin	Måneskin; Ferraguzzo; Brun^{[c]}	3:40
13.	"La fine"	Måneskin	Måneskin	Måneskin; Ferraguzzo; Brun^{[c]}	3:20
14.	"Il dono della vita"	Måneskin	Måneskin	Måneskin; Ferraguzzo; Brun^{[c]}	3:44
15.	"Mammamia"	Måneskin	Måneskin	Måneskin; Ferraguzzo	3:06
16.	"Supermodel"	Måneskin; Tranter	Måneskin; Yacoub; Martin; Sivertsen	Sly^{[p]}; Yacoub^{[p]}; Martin	2:28
17.	"The Loneliest"	Måneskin; Sarah Hudson; James Abrahart	Måneskin; Uzoechi Emenike; Yacoub; Jason Evigan	Måneskin; Ferraguzzo; Brun^{[c]}; Marco Vialardi^{[a]}	4:07
Total length:					52:42

Japanese edition bonus track
No.	Title	Lyrics	Music	Producer(s)	Length
18.	"Touch Me"	Måneskin	Måneskin	Måneskin; Ferraguzzo	3:47
Total length:					56:29

Japanese limited edition disc 2: Live at Toyosu Pit 2022.8.18
No.	Title	Length
1.	"Zitti e buoni"	4:37
2.	"In nome del padre"	5:03
3.	"Mammamia"	4:15
4.	"Beggin'"	3:45
5.	"Coraline"	5:11
6.	"Supermodel"	2:28
7.	"For Your Love"	6:11
8.	"Touch Me"	5:58
9.	"Le parole lontane"	5:13
10.	"I Wanna Be Your Slave"	6:34
Total length:		49:15

Rush! (Are U Coming?) – Reissue bonus tracks
No.	Title	Writer(s)	Producer(s)	Length
1.	"Honey (Are U Coming?)"	Måneskin; Yacoub; Tranter; Sivertsen; Jussi Karvinen; Cleo Tighe	Sly; Yacoub; Karvinen	2:47
2.	"Valentine"	Måneskin; Joseph Wander; Theo Hutchcraft	Ferraguzzo	3:37
3.	"Off My Face"	Måneskin; Benjamin Berger; Nicholas Gale; Ruth-Anne Cunningham; Ryan Rabin	Ferraguzzo	2:30
4.	"The Driver"	Måneskin; Dave Pittenger; Jordan Riley	Ferraguzzo	3:08
5.	"Trastevere"	Måneskin	Ferraguzzo	3:02
Total length:				67:06

Rush! (Are U Coming?) Japanese edition disc 2: Loud Kids Tour Gets Louder in Paris - Blu-ray Disc
No.	Title	Length
1.	"Don't Wanna Sleep"	4:41
2.	"Gossip"	3:01
3.	"Zitti e buoni"	4:17
4.	"Supermodel"	2:33
5.	"Timezone"	3:02
6.	"Bla Bla Bla"	3:32
7.	"Gasoline"	6:34
8.	"Kool Kids"	7:15
9.	"The Loneliest"	5:55
10.	"I Wanna Be Your Slave"	5:17
Total length:		46:08

Notes

- ^{^[p]} signifies a primary and vocal producer
- ^{^[c]} signifies a co-producer
- ^{^[a]} signifies an assistant producer

== Personnel ==
Måneskin

- Damiano David – lead vocals, backing vocals (track 7)
- Victoria De Angelis – bass, backing vocals
- Thomas Raggi – guitars
- Ethan Torchio – drums

Additional musicians

- Tom Morello – lead guitar (track 2)
- Rami Yacoub – arrangement, programming (3, 5, 6, 8, 10, 11); backing vocals (3, 6, 8)
- Sly – arrangement, programming (3, 5, 6, 8, 10, 11); backing vocals (3, 6, 8)
- Justin Tranter – backing vocals (6, 8, 11)
- Mattman & Robin – backing vocals, programming (7)
- Savan Kotecha – backing vocals (7)
- Max Martin – backing vocals (8)

Technical

- Enrico La Falce – mastering, mixing (1, 2, 4, 9, 12–14, 17); engineering (4, 9, 14)
- Randy Merrill – mastering (3, 5–8, 10, 11, 16)
- Mark "Spike" Stent – mixing (3, 5–7, 16)
- Serban Ghenea – mixing (8, 11)
- John Hanes – mixing (8), engineering (11)
- Michael Ilbert – mixing (10)
- Luca Pellegrini – engineering (1, 2, 4, 9, 12–14, 16, 17), vocal engineering (1, 2, 4, 14)
- Fabrizio Ferraguzzo – engineering (1, 4, 12–14), vocal engineering (2)
- Rami Yacoub – engineering (3, 5, 8, 10, 11)
- Sly – engineering (3, 5, 8, 10, 11)
- Jeremy Lertola – engineering (5, 10, 16)
- Sam Holland – engineering (5, 10, 16)
- Enrico Brun – engineering (12, 13)
- Marco Vialardi – editing (1, 2, 4, 9, 13, 14), engineering assistance (1, 2, 4, 9, 12, 13, 14, 17)
- Michael Gario – editing (2, 12)
- Matt Wolach – engineering assistance (3, 5–7)
- Gabriele Barban – engineering assistance (12, 13)
- Mattia Bonvini – engineering assistance (12, 13)
- Raffaele Stefani – engineering assistance (12, 13)

Visuals

- Aurora Manni – creative direction
- Tommaso Ottomano – art direction, photography
- Alice Zani – graphic design
- Daniela Boccadoro – graphic coordination

== Charts ==
=== Weekly charts ===
Weekly chart performance for Rush!
Chart (2023)	Peak position
Australian Albums (ARIA)	27
Austrian Albums (Ö3 Austria)	1
Belgian Albums (Ultratop Flanders)	1
Belgian Albums (Ultratop Wallonia)	1
Canadian Albums (Billboard)	10
Croatian International Albums (HDU)	1
Czech Albums (ČNS IFPI)	1
Danish Albums (Hitlisten)	13
Dutch Albums (Album Top 100)	1
Finnish Albums (Suomen virallinen lista)	4
French Albums (SNEP)	1
German Albums (Offizielle Top 100)	3
Greek Albums (IFPI)	1
Hungarian Albums (MAHASZ)	1
Icelandic Albums (Tónlistinn)	22
Irish Albums (Official Charts)	16
Italian Albums (FIMI)	1
Japanese Albums (Oricon)	8
Japanese Combined Albums (Oricon)	10
Japanese Hot Albums (Billboard Japan)	10
Latvian Albums (LAIPA)	1
Lithuanian Albums (AGATA)	1
Norwegian Albums (VG-lista)	6
Polish Albums (ZPAV)	3
Portuguese Albums (AFP)	1
Scottish Albums (Official Charts)	3
Slovak Albums (ČNS IFPI)	1
Spanish Albums (Promusicae)	2
Swedish Albums (Sverigetopplistan)	8
Swiss Albums (Schweizer Hitparade)	1
UK Albums (Official Charts)	5
UK Rock & Metal Albums (Official Charts)	2
US Billboard 200	18
US Top Alternative Albums (Billboard)	1
US Top Rock Albums (Billboard)	4
US Top Hard Rock Albums (Billboard)	2

Chart performance for Rush! (Are U Coming?)
Chart (2023)	Peak position
Finnish Albums (Suomen virallinen lista)	29
Italian Albums (FIMI)	3
Japanese Albums (Oricon)	32
Lithuanian Albums (AGATA)	8

=== Year-end charts ===
2023 year-end chart performance for Rush!
Chart (2023)	Position
Austrian Albums (Ö3 Austria)	21
Belgian Albums (Ultratop Flanders)	17
Belgian Albums (Ultratop Wallonia)	10
Dutch Albums (Album Top 100)	64
French Albums (SNEP)	16
German Albums (Offizielle Top 100)	58
Hungarian Albums (MAHASZ)	19
Italian Albums (FIMI)	11
Polish Albums (ZPAV)	14
Spanish Albums (PROMUSICAE)	41
Swiss Albums (Schweizer Hitparade)	17

2024 year-end chart performance for Rush!
Chart (2024)	Position
Belgian Albums (Ultratop Flanders)	84
Belgian Albums (Ultratop Wallonia)	37
French Albums (SNEP)	29
Hungarian Albums (MAHASZ)	55
Polish Albums (ZPAV)	74

2025 year-end chart performance for Rush!
Chart (2025)	Position
Belgian Albums (Ultratop Wallonia)	122
French Albums (SNEP)	93

== Certifications ==
Certifications for Rush!
Region	Certification	Certified units/sales
Belgium (BRMA)	Platinum	20,000^{‡}
Brazil (Pro-Música Brasil)	Gold	20,000^{‡}
France (SNEP)	2× Platinum	200,000^{‡}
Hungary (MAHASZ)	Platinum	4,000^{‡}
Italy (FIMI)	2× Platinum	100,000^{‡}
Mexico (AMPROFON)	Gold	70,000^{‡}
Poland (ZPAV)	3× Platinum	60,000^{‡}
Spain (Promusicae)	Gold	20,000^{‡}
United Kingdom (BPI)	Gold	100,000^{‡}
^{‡} Sales+streaming figures based on certification alone.
