= Baby Said =

Single by Måneskin

from the album Rush!
- Released: 3 March 2023
- Length: 2:44
- Label: Epic
- Songwriters: Damiano David; Victoria De Angelis; Thomas Raggi; Ethan Torchio; Justin Tranter; Max Martin; Rami Yacoub; Sylvester Sivertsen
- Producers: Rami Yacoub; Sly

Måneskin singles chronology
"Gossip" (2023)	"Baby Said" (2023)	"Honey (Are U Coming?)" (2023)

Lyric video
- "Baby Said" on YouTube

"Baby Said" (stylized in all caps) is a song by Italian rock band Måneskin. It was released on 3 March 2023 as the fifth single from their third studio album Rush! (2023).

== Charts ==
=== Weekly charts ===
Weekly chart performance for "Baby Said"
Chart (2023)	Peak position
Belgium (Ultratop 50 Flanders)	45
Belgium (Ultratop 50 Wallonia)	29
Czech Republic Singles Digital (ČNS IFPI)	93
France (SNEP)	50
Greece International (IFPI)	82
Italy (FIMI)	99
Latvia (LAIPA)	10
Lithuania (AGATA)	18
New Zealand Hot Singles (RMNZ)	25
Poland (Polish Airplay Top 100)	1
Poland (Polish Streaming Top 100)	52
San Marino (SMRRTV Top 50)	12
Slovakia Airplay (ČNS IFPI)	25
Slovakia Singles Digital (ČNS IFPI)	92
UK Rock & Metal (Official Charts)	28
US Hot Hard Rock Songs (Billboard)	17

=== Year-end charts ===
Year-end chart performance for "Baby Said"
Chart (2023)	Position
Belgium (Ultratop 50 Wallonia)	81
France (SNEP)	130
Poland (Polish Airplay Top 100)	30

== Certifications ==
Certifications for "Baby Said"
Region	Certification	Certified units/sales
France (SNEP)	Diamond	333,333^{‡}
Italy (FIMI)	Gold	50,000^{‡}
Mexico (AMPROFON)	Gold	70,000^{‡}
Poland (ZPAV)	Platinum	50,000^{‡}
^{‡} Sales+streaming figures based on certification alone.
