= Gossip (Måneskin song) =

Single by Måneskin featuring Tom Morello

from the album Rush!
- Released: 13 January 2023
- Genre: Hard rock
- Length: 2:48
- Label: Epic
- Songwriters: Damiano David; Victoria De Angelis; Thomas Raggi; Ethan Torchio; Madison Love; Joseph Janiak
- Producers: Fabrizio Ferraguzzo; Måneskin; Enrico Brun

Måneskin singles chronology
"The Loneliest" (2022)	"Gossip" (2023)	"Baby Said" (2023)

Music video
- "Gossip" on YouTube

"Gossip" is a song by Italian rock band Måneskin featuring American guitarist Tom Morello. It was released on 13 January 2023 as the fourth single from their third studio album Rush! (2023).

== Critical reception ==
The song was positively received by music critics, appreciating the instrumental intervention of Tom Morello and the orientation to hard rock sounds. Will Richards of NME called the song's sounds "rock'n'roll with rough guitars and a driving beat"; similarly Abby Jones of Consequence wrote that the sounds are in continuity with the band's "catchy, danceable rock," calling Morello's solo "emphatic."

Lyrically, Italian specialised critics pointed out that "Gossip" represents a "critique of the vacuity of the American gossiping good world" and especially of the city of Los Angeles, which according to Rolling Stone Italia does not represent "the city of angels" but that "of lies where "everything has a price" and "you can become a movie star. You can have it all, 'as long as you get a plastic face.'" Specifically, Vanity Fair Italia's Mario Manca explained that the group sings against "gossip and its pitfalls" since it "ruins the lives of well-known people by inventing news and fueling suspicion and fear."

== Music video ==
The music video for the song, directed by Tommaso Ottomano, was released on 13 January 2023, the same day the single was released.

== Charts ==
=== Weekly charts ===
Weekly chart performance for "Gossip"
Chart (2023)	Peak position
Austria (Ö3 Austria Top 40)	62
Belarus Airplay (TopHit)	7
Canada Rock (Billboard)	5
CIS Airplay (TopHit)	13
Croatia International Airplay (Top lista)	13
Czech Republic Airplay (ČNS IFPI)	5
Czech Republic Singles Digital (ČNS IFPI)	38
Estonia Airplay (TopHit)	46
Global Excl. U.S. (Billboard)	167
Greece International (IFPI)	36
Hungary (Single Top 40)	11
Hungary (Stream Top 40)	33
Italy (FIMI)	24
Japan Hot Overseas (Billboard Japan)	1
Kazakhstan Airplay (TopHit)	20
Latvia (LaIPA)	6
Lithuania (AGATA)	6
Lithuania Airplay (TopHit)	21
Netherlands (Single Top 100)	86
New Zealand Hot Singles (RMNZ)	39
Poland (Polish Airplay Top 100)	1
Poland (Polish Streaming Top 100)	11
Portugal (AFP)	177
Russia Airplay (TopHit)	12
San Marino Airplay (SMRTV Top 50)	14
Slovakia Airplay (ČNS IFPI)	22
Slovakia Singles Digital (ČNS IFPI)	33
Switzerland (Schweizer Hitparade)	61
UK Singles Downloads (OCC)	96
UK Singles Sales (OCC)	97
US Hot Rock & Alternative Songs (Billboard)	42

=== Monthly charts ===
Monthly chart performance for "Gossip"
Chart (2023)	Peak position
Russia Airplay (TopHit)	11

=== Year-end charts ===
Year-end chart performance for "Gossip"
Chart (2023)	Position
Belarus Airplay (TopHit)	37
Poland (Polish Airplay Top 100)	8
Poland (Polish Streaming Top 100)	45
Russia Airplay (TopHit)	20

2025 year-end chart performance for "Gossip"
Chart (2025)	Position
Belarus Airplay (TopHit)	108

== Certifications ==
Certifications for "Gossip"
Region	Certification	Certified units/sales
Austria (IFPI Austria)	Gold	15,000^{‡}
Brazil (Pro-Música Brasil)	Gold	20,000^{‡}
France (SNEP)	Gold	100,000^{‡}
Hungary (MAHASZ)	Platinum	4,000^{‡}
Italy (FIMI)	Platinum	100,000^{‡}
New Zealand (RMNZ)	Gold	15,000^{‡}
Poland (ZPAV)	2× Platinum	100,000^{‡}
Spain (Promusicae)	Gold	30,000^{‡}
United States (RIAA)	Gold	500,000^{‡}
^{‡} Sales+streaming figures based on certification alone.
