= Onimusha (TV series) =

Japanese anime television series

- Promotional poster

鬼武者
- Original net animation
- Directed by: Takashi Miike (chief); Shinya Sugai
- Written by: Hideyuki Kurata
- Music by: Koji Endo
- Studio: Sublimation
- Licensed by: Netflix
- Released: November 2, 2023
- Runtime: 22–36 minutes
- Episodes: 8
- icon

Onimusha (鬼武者) is an original net animation (ONA) series, based on the video game franchise of the same name by Capcom. Produced by Sublimation and directed by Shinya Sugai, it was released on Netflix on November 2, 2023.

== Premise ==
Set in the early Edo period, a time when Japan was transitioning towards peace, and warfare was fading into history, an aging Musashi embarks on a covert mission. Armed with the mythical "Oni Gauntlet", Musashi embarks on an epic journey to vanquish the lurking demons.

== Characters ==
Musashi Miyamoto (宮本武蔵, Miyamoto Musashi)
Voiced by: Akio Otsuka (Japanese); Alain Mesa (English)
Kojiro Sasaki (佐々木小次郎, Sasaki Kojirō)
Voiced by: Toshihiko Seki (Japanese); Greg Chun (English)
Kensuke Matsui (松井健介, Matsui Kensuke)
Voiced by: Hōchū Ōtsuka (Japanese); Kirk Thornton (English)
Sahei (佐平, Sahei)
Voiced by: Daiki Yamashita (Japanese); Yuri Lowenthal (English)
Goro-Maru (五郎丸, Gorōmaru)
Voiced by: Subaru Kimura (Japanese); Christopher Swindle (English)
Heikuro (平九郎, Heikurō)
Voiced by: Katsuyuki Konishi (Japanese); Matthew Yang King (English)
Kaizen (カイゼン, Kaizen)
Voiced by: Kazuyuki Okitsu (Japanese); Chris Hackney (English)
Gensai (玄斎, Gen toki)
Voiced by: Makoto Furukawa (Japanese); Kyle McCarley (English)
Sayo (小夜, Sayo)
Voiced by: Aya Yamane (Japanese); Sarah Anne Williams (English)
Iemon (伊右衛門, Iemon)
Voiced by: Ryohei Kimura (Japanese); Robbie Daymond (English)

== Production and release ==
The series was first revealed in September 2022 during Netflix's virtual Tudum event. It is being chief directed by Takashi Miike, with Shinya Sugai directing, Sublimation producing the animation, Hideyuki Kurata writing the scripts, and Koji Endo composing the music. The series used Japanese actor Toshiro Mifune as a model for the character of Musashi. The series' theme song is "The Loneliest" performed by Måneskin. It was released on Netflix on November 2, 2023. In December 2025, Capcom producer Akihito Kadowaki stated that he was looking forward to the series' sequel.

=== Episodes ===
No.	Title	Original release date
1	"Demon"	November 2, 2023
Musashi proves his ability to the head monk at a temple to enable him to borrow a specific item in a wooden box for 33 days, although he is forced to be chaperoned by the young monk Kaizen. Musashi joins his band of 5 men who are accompanying him on a mission by the local lord to defeat Iemon who is terrorizing a village. As they near Iemon's village, Musashi exposes Matsuke as a traitor and kills him in a duel. Gensai is then revealed to be a Genma, controlled by Iemon and although he tries to resist Iemon's control he savagely attacks Musashi who only defeats him by using the Oni gauntlet from the box being carried by Kaizen.
2	"Mountain Demon"	November 2, 2023
The group arrives at the village to find it abandoned, except for a young girl, Sayo. Before long they are attacked by the villagers who have been turned into zombies by Iemon. The group devise a plan to lure the zombies into a trap and then destroy them all with gunpowder. They discover that the villagers had discovered gold while mining for copper and tin. They told the lord who wanted to keep it a secret from the shogunate, and he sent in Iemon who killed them all. Sayo swears to avenge her grandparents and the village, and Musashi offers to help.
3	"Nightmare"	November 2, 2023
As Sayo leads the group up the steep mountain to Iemon's fortress, they are attacked by zombie samurai, but they manage to defeat them with the help of Goromaru's hawks. However, Goromaru and one of his hawks are killed by a spear thrown by Iemon's Genma henchmen who grab Sayo and challenge Musashi to meet them at a temple the next day to retrieve her.
4	"Bewitch"	November 2, 2023
Musashi's small group arrive at the temple and are met by Iemon's genma who reveal themselves to be the three Yoshioka brothers who Musashi killed 20 years earlier. While they fight, Sahei, Kaizen and Heikuro go to save Sayo who is trapped within a huge burning bell. Musashi is initially beaten by the Yoshioka genmas, but after the others rescue Sayo with a superhuman effort, especially from Kaizen who suffers incredible burns. Musashi renews his attack with the help of the Oni gauntlet and cuts the genmas to pieces. The gauntlet absorbs their souls, but Kaizen prevents Musashi from becoming an Oni himself before dying from his injuries.
5	"Yin Soul"	November 2, 2023
No sooner does Musashi defeat the Yoshioka brothers than he is confronted by three women claiming to be the Yoshioka sisters. A flashback shows how an urchin took the sword and name of the samurai Iemon. The group separately face their inner fears and press forward with new resolve. They again encounter the Yoshioka sisters, but Musashi defeat them quickly and they press on towards Iemon's castle.
6	"Oni"	November 2, 2023
The group enter the gold mine and find a cavern lined with gold and are greeted by Alfred, Iemon's manservant who leads them into the underground castle, glittering with gold. They are suddenly attacked by a centaur and Heikuro sacrifices himself to save the others while Musashi finishes off Alfred. Sayo's parents appear, but they begin to choke Sayo as they are controlled by Iemon. Musashi is conflicted as to what to do, but he kills them both to save Sayo.
7	"Harbinger"	November 2, 2023
Iemon finally reveals himself and calls on a genma, the former famous swordsman, Sasaki Kojiro who was killed by Musashi. He orders Sasaki to cut off Musashi's arms and legs, however, instead he severs Iemon's limbs so that he can focus on defeating Musashi without distraction. They engage in battle, with Musashi using the gauntlet to aid him against the multi-armed Sasaki and his superhuman powers.
8	"Yang Soul"	November 2, 2023
The battle between Musashi and Sasaki continues, but they are distracted by hordes of skeletal genma. The samurai rush to a stone bridge to continue their fight where Sasaki uses his mystical powers to firstly destroy the genma, then the bridge supporting them. They plunge to the depths below while still clashing swords and even when they reach the bottom, Sasaki continues his attack. Meanwhile, Sahei and Sayo come across the limbless torso of Iemon who still wants to pursue his dream of conquest as a genma. He offers Sahei a place at his side, but Sahei poisons him instead. Sayo finds Musashi and convinces him to fight as a human, and as she leaves, the entire mine site collapses from the force of the battle. Later, the head monk at the temple finds the Oni gauntlet returned, but appears to be heavier than before.

== Reception ==
On the review aggregator website Rotten Tomatoes, 100% of five critics' reviews are positive.
