= Valentine (Måneskin song) =

Single by Måneskin

from the album Rush! (Are U Coming?)
- Released: 17 November 2023
- Genre: Rock
- Length: 3:36
- Label: Sony
- Songwriters: Damiano David; Victoria De Angelis; Thomas Raggi; Ethan Torchio; Joseph Wander; Theo Hutchcraft
- Producer: Fabrizio Ferraguzzo

Måneskin singles chronology
"Honey (Are U Coming?)" (2023)	"Valentine" (2023)

Music video
- "Valentine" on YouTube

"Valentine" is a song by Italian rock band Måneskin from Rush! (Are U Coming?), the reissue of their third studio album, Rush! (2023). It was written by all four members of the band—Damiano David, Victoria De Angelis, Thomas Raggi, and Ethan Torchio—alongside Joseph Wander and Theo Hutchcraft, while Fabrizio Ferraguzzo handled its production. Sony Music released the song to Italian radio airplay on 17 November 2023 as the second single from the reissue. A rock ballad, "Valentine" contains lyrics about a suffocating relationship, and ends with a crescendo of guitar solos.

George Gallardo Kattah directed the music video for "Valentine", released on 10 November 2023, coinciding with the release date of the reissue. The dramatic video, shot in Mexico City, shows Måneskin's members performing in a cavernous warehouse. Upon its release, "Valentine" charted moderately in Europe, reaching the major music charts of France, Italy, Latvia, Lithuania, Poland, and San Marino. It received a Gold certification by the Syndicat National de l'Édition Phonographique (SNEP).

== Background and release ==
In September 2023, while being on tour to promote their third studio album Rush!, Måneskin announced that they would be releasing an extended edition of the album, titled Rush! (Are U Coming?), set for release on 10 November. They also revealed its tracklist, which contained "Valentine" as the second track. On 6 November 2023, the band teased "Valentine" on a Facebook post, accompanied by black-and-white footage of the music video performance, hinting that it would be released as a single.

The release of Rush! (Are U Coming?) was accompanied by the music video for "Valentine". It was directed by George Gallardo Kattah and shot in Mexico City. In the dramatic video, the band is shown in a cavernous warehouse. A week after, "Valentine" was sent to Italian airplay, through Sony Music, as the second single from the reissue following "Honey (Are U Coming?)".

== Music and lyrics ==
"Valentine" is a rock ballad about "suffocating love that leads to madness", according to Billboard Italia, intertwining David's voice with guitar arpeggios. The same magazine compared the track to British sounds, by both sound and rhythmic construction. The lyrics also expresses the expectation of having a child with the protagonist: "So I hold in my hands pictures of you / And dream of the day you were eating for two". Mxdwn described it as a "powerful and influential", "touching and attractive" song, which contains powerful instrumentation and lyrics that "instantly gravitate fans to listen to the song and engage with it in a deeper manner". The outro contains a crescendo of guitar solos.

== Charts ==
Chart performance for "Valentine"
Chart (2023–2024)	Peak position
France (SNEP)	77
Greece International (IFPI)	15
Italy (FIMI)	65
Latvia (LAIPA)	19
Lithuania (AGATA)	24
Poland (Polish Streaming Top 100)	95
San Marino (SMRRTV Top 50)	33
UK Rock & Metal (Official Charts)	20

== Certifications ==
Certifications for "Valentine"
Region	Certification	Certified units/sales
France (SNEP)	Platinum	200,000^{‡}
^{‡} Sales+streaming figures based on certification alone.
