= Samurai Flamenco =

Japanese media franchise

- Key visual for the series

サムライフラメンコ (Samurai Furamenko)
- Genre: Comedy; Superhero
- Created by: Manglobe
- Anime television series
- Directed by: Takahiro Omori
- Produced by: Shinichirō Kobayashi; Kōji Yamamoto
- Written by: Hideyuki Kurata
- Music by: Agehasprings; Kenji Tamai
- Studio: Manglobe
- Licensed by: AUS: Madman Entertainment; NA: Aniplex of America; UK: Anime Limited
- Original network: Fuji TV (Noitamina)
- Original run: October 11, 2013 – March 28, 2014
- Episodes: 22
- Manga

Samurai Flamenco: Another Days
- Written by: Seiko Takagi
- Illustrated by: Shō Mizusawa
- Published by: Square Enix
- Imprint: G Fantasy Comics
- Magazine: Monthly GFantasy
- Original run: October 18, 2013 – July 18, 2014
- Volumes: 2
- icon

Samurai Flamenco (Japanese: サムライフラメンコ, Hepburn: Samurai Furamenko) is a Japanese anime television series conceptualized by Manglobe and produced by Aniplex, Fuji TV, Kyoraku Industrial Holdings, Dentsu, Hobibox, Movic and DeNA. It was directed by Takahiro Omori, with Hideyuki Kurata handling series composition, Chinatsu Kurahana and Yoshimitsu Yamashita designing the characters, Masaki Yamada serving as main animator, and Agehasprings and Kenji Tamai composing the music. The series focuses on Masayoshi Hazama, a young adult who aspires to become a superhero despite having no superpowers. In doing so, he meets several people who support his cause.

It was broadcast for 22 episodes on Fuji TV's Noitamina programming block from October 2013 to March 2014. Aniplex of America has licensed the series for North America. A manga series by Seiko Takagi and Shō Mizusawa, titled Samurai Flamenco: Another Days, was published in Square Enix's Monthly GFantasy from October 2013 to July 2014, with its chapters collected in two tankōbon volumes.

== Plot ==
Male model Masayoshi Hazama decides to fulfill his childhood dream of becoming a superhero, despite having no superpowers or the technology to create a high-powered suit. He becomes the hero Samurai Flamenco and begins to fight crime in the name of justice. Police officer Hidenori Gotō finds out about Samurai Flamenco and his real identity by a twist of fate, which leads to him getting involved into much trouble, especially when they come across enemies that were not thought to exist outside of fiction. Nonetheless, these two young men will come face to face with hardships of being crime-fighters while discovering what it truly means to be a hero of justice.

== Characters ==
=== Main characters ===
Masayoshi Hazama (羽佐間 正義, Hazama Masayoshi)
Voiced by: Toshiki Masuda
Masayoshi is a male model who assumes the identity of the costumed hero Samurai Flamenco (サムライフラメンコ, Samurai Furamenko). Inspired by his grandfather's tokusatsu-inspired "Samurai Flamenco Project", he initially combats ordinary criminals before facing genuine threats like the Torture organization. Following their defeat, he leads the Samurai Sentai Flamenger (サムライ戦隊フラメンジャー, Samurai Sentai Furamenjā) as Flamen Red (フラメンレッド, Furamen Reddo) against the From Beyond cadre. After this conflict, he becomes a fugitive and resumes his solo activities, eventually discovering that a being known as Alien Flamenco has been manipulating events. Despite his heroic persona, Masayoshi possesses a shy demeanor in his civilian life.
Hidenori Gotō (後藤 英徳, Gotō Hidenori)
Voiced by: Tomokazu Sugita
Hidenori is a diligent policeman with a cynical worldview. After discovering Masayoshi's secret identity as Samurai Flamenco, his life becomes increasingly complicated. He maintains the fiction of a long-distance relationship, though his girlfriend has been missing for years; he preserves his sanity by saving her old text messages. The villain Haiji exploits this vulnerability, deleting the messages to psychologically torment him. Despite his initial cynicism, Hidenori gradually develops a respect for Masayoshi's unwavering commitment to justice.

=== Mineral Miracle Muse / Flamenco Girls ===
Mari Maya (真野 まり, Maya Mari)
Voiced by: Haruka Tomatsu
Mari is a member of the idol group Mineral Miracle Muse (ミネラル★ミラクル★ミューズ, Mineraru Mirakuru Myūzu), serving as its composer and lyricist. Her bright personality makes her sociable. She fights as the magical girl Flamenco Diamond (フラメンコダイヤ, Furamenko Daiya) and is aware of Masayoshi's dual identity. Her brutal, vengeful approach to crime contrasts with his idealism. After being kidnapped and tortured, she develops a hatred for superheroes and goes into hiding, wrestling with shame and inferiority. She eventually reconciles with her friends and resumes her role. Mari also has a distinct fondness for men in uniform.
Mizuki Misawa (三澤 瑞希, Misawa Mizuki)
Voiced by: M·A·O
Mizuki is the leader of the idol group Mineral Miracle Muse, known for her caring nature. She is recruited by Mari to join the superhero team as Flamenco Ruby (フラメンコルビー, Furamenko Rubī). A native of the Kansai region, she is later poisoned by the villain Haiji before a concert as part of his campaign against Masayoshi.
Moe Morita (森田 萌, Morita Moe)
Voiced by: Erii Yamazaki
Moe is a member of Mineral Miracle Muse and later becomes the magical girl Flamenco Sapphire (フラメンコサファイア, Furamenko Safaia). A reserved yet carefree high-school student and a native English speaker, she shares a close bond with Mari. During their kidnapping by King Torture, she offers herself in exchange for Mari's freedom, resulting in a severe injury. She later finds Mari in hiding and helps reconcile their relationship, leading to the Flamenco Girls' reunion. Like Mizuki, she is also poisoned by the villain Haiji.

=== Samurai Sentai Flamenger ===
Anji Kuroki (黒木 闇児, Kuroki Anji)
Voiced by: KENN
Anji is recruited by Joji to serve as Flamen Black (フラメンブラック, Furamen Burakku), the weapons specialist of the Flamengers. In his civilian life, he farms and cares for his sickly grandfather. The villain Haiji later attacks his grandfather as part of a campaign to agitate Masayoshi.
Sakura Momoi (桃井 桜, Momoi Sakura)
Voiced by: Yukari Tamura
Sakura is the only female member of the Flamengers, serving as Flamen Pink (フラメンピンク, Furamen Pinku) and handling public relations. She joins due to her strong affection for Joji Kaname, causing friction with his wife. Hailing from a wealthy family, she is disowned for this obsession but is later reconciled. She enjoys knitting despite considering it overly feminine. Sakura is deeply proud of her long hair and is traumatized when the villain Haiji cuts it.
Soichi Aoshima (青島 蒼一, Aoshima Sōichi)
Voiced by: Showtaro Morikubo
Soichi is a longtime friend of Joji and serves as Flamen Blue (フラメンブルー, Furamen Burū), the Flamengers' second-in-command and strongest fighter. He initially resents Masayoshi's leadership, desiring the position of Flamen Red for himself due to his loyalty to Joji, but eventually gains respect for Masayoshi. Despite his youthful appearance, he is the team's oldest member. The villain Haiji later vandalizes his apartment, destroying his collection of Red Axe memorabilia to agitate Masayoshi. Following the team's dissolution, Soichi and Joji work together as actors portraying the hero "Neo Axe".
Hekiru Midorikawa (緑川 碧, Midorikawa Hekiru)
Voiced by: Toshiyuki Toyonaga
Hekiru is the stoic Flamen Green (フラメングリーン, Furamen Gurīn), the Flamengers' strategist and tactical analyst. He cares deeply for his sister and young niece. The villain Haiji exploits these attachments and destroys Hekiru's favorite book to torment him. After the team's dissolution, Hekiru attends graduate school, where he gains a number of persistent female admirers.

=== Antagonists ===
King Torture (キング・トーチャー, Kingu Tōchā)
Voiced by: Shō Hayami
King Torture is a criminal mastermind who delights in torturing his victims. He commands hypnotized individuals, transforming them into monsters whose crimes grow increasingly absurd to mask his true goal: merging humanity into a single hive-minded entity to enforce a twisted peace. A former enthusiast of superheroism who embraced villainy, he views heroism as futile. He claims his followers willingly undergo transformation for their shared dream, memorializing them in a shrine. In his fanatical devotion, he amputates his own arm to attach a chainsaw weapon. King Torture is ultimately impaled on a fragment of his own statue and dies after his final missile is destroyed. His defeated followers shout "Viva Torture" upon death.
From Beyond (フロム・ビヨンド, Furomu Biyondo)
From Beyond is an alien organization that supplied King Torture with the power to create monsters. It introduces its threats through stylish promotional videos. The group is structured into smaller cadres, which the Flamengers confront individually. Its de facto leader is Beyond Flamenco, a being identical to Masayoshi who claims to be his brother but is actually an alternate version who abandoned his ideals in a crusade against evil. After Beyond Flamenco dies by suicide with Masayoshi's gun, the entire remaining membership of From Beyond vanishes. Its defeated monsters recite the oath "From Beyond to Heaven" upon death.
Shintarō F. Okuzaki (尾久崎・F・慎太郎, Okuzaki F. Shintarō)
Voiced by: Kōji Ishii
Shintarō is the Prime Minister of Japan who spearheads an anti-vigilante campaign to raise his public approval rating. He possesses a special suit of armor that grows stronger as his ratings increase. The "F" in his name stands for "Flamenco", a pattern Masayoshi notices is recurring. He is ousted from office after the public learns his campaign was motivated by ratings rather than civic concern. In reality, his goal was to amass enough power to defeat the extraterrestrial threat, Alien Flamenco.
Haiji Sawada (澤田 灰司, Sawada Haiji)
Voiced by: Suzuki Haruhisa
Haiji is a delinquent youth first encountered by Masayoshi. After the defeat of Alien Flamenco, he re-emerges, destroying Masayoshi's apartment and revealing a deep obsession with Samurai Flamenco. He orchestrates a campaign of psychological torment against Masayoshi's allies, aiming to transform the hero into a dark anti-hero called "Samurai Flamenco Darkness". His plan culminates in an attempt to be killed by Hidenori to provide Masayoshi with a tragic backstory, which fails. Haiji is subsequently subdued by Mari and incarcerated. He vows to return, a challenge Masayoshi accepts on the condition that his friends remain unharmed.

=== Other characters ===
Joji Kaname (要 丈治, Kaname Jōji)
Voiced by: Jūrōta Kosugi
Joji Kaname is a famous action actor, known for starring in the television show Red Axe (レッドアックス, Reddo Akkusu). He becomes Masayoshi's combat trainer and later reveals he is a member of a secret organization, recruiting Masayoshi and others to form the Flamengers. He subsequently discloses that he is the genuine Red Axe, having secretly fought monsters for years alongside other heroes like Harakiri Sunshine and his wife, Lady Axe. Joji is critically injured when Haiji runs him over with a truck. After recovering, he becomes the director of a museum dedicated to heroes.
Jun Harazuka (原塚 淳, Harazuka Jun)
Voiced by: Tōru Ōkawa
Jun Harazuka is a middle-aged developer for the stationery company Monsters Stationery. He provides Masayoshi with non-lethal weapons disguised as stationery to aid his crime-fighting. Habitually wearing protective body armor of his own design, this precaution saves him from grave injury when the villain Haiji pushes him down a flight of stairs.
Sumi Ishihara (石原 澄, Ishihara Sumi)
Voiced by: Chie Nakamura
Sumi is a strict and competent manager at the production company Caesar Pro, acting as Masayoshi's employer. She suspects his secret identity early on and works diligently to protect it until he makes a public revelation. After being saved by Samurai Flamenco, her demeanor softens. She suspects a close relationship between Masayoshi and Goto, often encouraging Masayoshi to confide in him. Sumi later confirms to Masayoshi that she had deduced his identity long before his official disclosure.
Akira Konno (今野 明, Konno Akira)
Voiced by: Satoshi Mikami
Akira is the manager of the news website High Rollers Hi! and takes a professional interest in uncovering Samurai Flamenco's identity. He pursues Sumi Ishihara romantically, despite her repeated rejections, even proposing to her during a torture session. After being tortured by King Torture, he leaves the country to recuperate. Konno later films Mari's challenge to King Torture and the subsequent battle between the Prime Minister and Samurai Flamenco.
Totsuka (戸塚)
Voiced by: Masayuki Katou
Totsuka is Goto's colleague and section chief at the police box. Preferring to remain focused on his duties, he is nonetheless observant of Goto's personal life. He notices Goto's concern for Masayoshi, having been present when Masayoshi first returned a dry-cleaned shirt and on numerous occasions when Goto was researching Samurai Flamenco.

== Media ==
=== Anime ===
The series, directed by Takahiro Omori and written by Hideyuki Kurata, was broadcast on Fuji TV's Noitamina programming block from October 11, 2013, to March 28, 2014. (Note: Fuji TV listed the series air dates on Thursday at 25:20, which is effectively Friday at 1:20 JST.) The episodes have been collected in eleven DVD and Blu-ray volumes released between December 25, 2013, and October 22, 2014.

For the first part of the series, the opening theme for the anime is "Just One Life" performed by Spyair and the ending theme song is "Date Time" (デートTIME, Dēto Taimu), performed by Haruka Tomatsu, Erii Yamazaki, and M·A·O as their characters' band Mineral Miracle Muse. For the second part, the opening is "Ai Ai Ai ni Utarete Bye Bye Bye" (愛愛愛に撃たれてバイバイバイ, Ai Ai Ai ni Utarete Bai Bai Bai) by Flow and the ending is "Flight 23-ji" (フライト23時, Furaito Nijūsanji) also performed by Mineral Miracle Muse.

The series was simulcast by Crunchyroll; it was removed from the platform on May 28, 2021. The series has been licensed by Aniplex of America in North America, Anime Limited in the United Kingdom, and Madman Entertainment in Australia, which released the series in Japanese audio with English subtitles.

==== Episodes ====
Episodes 6, 8, 12, 15, 17, 19 and 20 were written by Takahiro. All other episodes were written by Hideyuki Kurata.

No.	Title	Storyboard by	Directed by	Animation supervision by	Original release date
1	"Samurai Flamenco Debuts!"; Transliteration: "Samurai Furamenko, Debyū!" (Japanese: サムライフラメンコ、デビュー!)	Takahiro Omori	Takahiro Omori, Shinpei Nagai	Masaki Yamada, Wataru Yamamoto	October 11, 2013
Masayoshi Hazama, who has always dreamed of being a hero, becomes the masked vigilante "Samurai Flamenco" to fight for justice. His efforts are ineffective and lead to considerable trouble. A police officer, Hidenori Gotō, discovers his secret and offers his assistance.
2	"My Umbrella Is Missing"; Transliteration: "Kasa ga Nai" (Japanese: 傘がない)	Katsumi Terahigashi	Shunsuke Machitani	Naoyuki Asano, Kenichi Kutsuna, Masaki Takasaka	October 18, 2013
Masayoshi struggles to concile his work as a model and his secret life of crimefighting with no success, until he rushes to stop a man who stole an umbrella and the ensuing situation brings him the attention of the media.
3	"Flamenco vs. Fake Flamenco"; Transliteration: "Furamenko VS Nisefuramenko" (Japanese: フラメンコVSニセフラメンコ)	Yoshiharu Ashino	Aki Hayashi	Yūji Hakamada, Masaiku Tayori	October 25, 2013
As the ruse about Samurai Flamenco increases, Masayoshi meets Joji Kaname, a veteran actor of action hero shows and one of his idols since childhood. However, tension rises between them when Joji attempts to take advantage of Flamenco's sudden fame to bolster his own career.
4	"Idol Devastation"; Transliteration: "Aidoru Jūrin" (Japanese: アイドル蹂躙)	Wakiichi Yūta	Mamiko Sekiya	Takao Hasegawa, Shunryō Yamamura	November 1, 2013
Masayoshi is approached by Mari Maya, an idol and aspiring superheroine who drags him to do her bidding as she starts fighting crime in the city as the "Flamenco Girl".
5	"The Meaning of Justice"; Transliteration: "Seigi to wa" (Japanese: 正義とは)	Fumiya Kitajō	Fumiya Kitajō	Wataru Yamamoto, Saka Ikeda, Yūji Hakamada	November 8, 2013
The partnership between Samurai Flamenco and Flamenco Girl soon attracts the media's attention, until their conflicting views of justice puts a divide between them and Mari decides to join forces with her fellow idols instead.
6	"Capture Samumenco!"; Transliteration: "Samumenko o Tsukamaero!" (Japanese: サムメンコを捕まえろ！)	Eiji Suganuma	Yūsuke Onoda	Masaiku Tayori, Masaki Takasaka, Akane Umezu	November 15, 2013
A huge sum is offered to whoever exposes the identity of Samurai Flamenco and Masayoshi is facing the risk of his secret identity exposed, until scientist Jun Harazuka appears with some weapons disguised as stationary to help him.
7	"Change the World"; Transliteration: "Chenji za Wārudo" (Japanese: チェンジ・ザ・ワールド)	Jirō Nakamura	Akira Satō	Toshie Nakamura, Yūji Hakamada, Takao Hasegawa, Yōko Kutsuzawa, Masahiro Yamanaka	November 22, 2013
The efforts of Samurai Flamenco and the Flamenco Girls bear fruit and the city becomes a safer place, but Masayoshi is devastated upon learning the secret behind his parents' death. When doing a PR event with the police, Masayoshi and Hidenori find themselves in a pinch when a real monster appears before them.
8	"Attack! Army of Evil"; Transliteration: "Mōkō! Aku no Gundan" (Japanese: 猛攻！悪の軍団)	Futoshi Higashide	Futoshi Higashide	Takaaki Wada, Yoshihiro Kanno, Shunryō Yamamura, Saka Ikeda	November 29, 2013
King Torture, leader of the evil "Torture" organization declares his intention to enslave the people of Japan and dares Samurai Flamenco to challenge him. Since then a monster attacks the city every week, just to be defeated by Flamenco with assistance from Hidenori and the Flamenco Girls. As the heroes always defeat Torture's monsters, the Japanese Government stops caring about it at all and both Masayoshi and Mari's band have a huge leap in their careers, unaware that according to King Torture, everything is going as he planned.
9	"Predetermined Quota"; Transliteration: "Aragaenu Noruma" (Japanese: 抗えぬノルマ)	Miyana Okita	Aki Hayashi	Toshie Nakamura, Masaiku Tayori, Yūji Hakamada, Katsuhiro Kumagai, Saka Ikeda, Masahiro Yamanaka, Masaki Takasaka	December 5, 2013
As the monsters sent by Torture are continuously defeated by Masayoshi without further casualties, the population stop bothering at all for their battles and even Mari stops lending him a hand, determined to confront King Torture herself instead. However, Mari ends up captured by King Torture who uses her as a hostage to challenge Samurai Flamenco for a decisive battle.
10	"Final Battle at the Enemy Base!"; Transliteration: "Kessen! Teki no Kichi" (Japanese: 決戦!敵の基地)	Katsumi Terahigashi	Hiroyoshi Aoyagi	Toshie Nakamura, Manabu Nii, Emi Hirano, Naoaki Hōjō, Akane Umezu, Kazuma Uike, Takao Hasegawa	December 12, 2013
Having captured both Mari and Moe, Torture brutally tortures Moe, who expresses her desire to take Mari's place in order to save her. Torture in turn releases Moe, stating to Mari that she herself never really cared for her. Masayoshi eventually arrives and confronts Torture, who explains how he was a boy who enjoyed superhero stories but once realizing that the heroes he idolized never attain the true peace they fight for, he decided to turn to evil instead. When Torture corners Masayoshi, he is impaled after Hidenori arrives on the scene. Torture then reveals his master plan, in which he plans to launch a rocket that will release particles that will combine with particles left behind by the defeated monsters and create a giant monster. However, Hidenori manages to stop the rocket from launching whilst Masayoshi defeats Torture. After defeating the villain and stopping his master plan with Hidenori's help, Masayoshi reveals his secret identity to the world.
11	"From Beyond"; Transliteration: "Furomu Biyondo" (Japanese: フロム・ビヨンド)	Wakiichi Yūta	Toshiaki Kidokoro	Yoshinori Deno, Yūji Hakamada, Masaki Takasaka, Saka Ikeda, Masaiku Tayori, Takao Hasegawa, Yukinori Umetsu	December 19, 2013
Just as the press question Masayoshi about his identity, a mysterious floating island rises from the Tokyo Bay. Joji reveals to Masayoshi that this is the work of From Beyond, an alien organisation that provided Torture with the power to make monsters. To this end, Joji has been assembling a team known as the Flamengers, planning on recruiting Masayoshi as their leader. Upon reaching their secret base, however, they discover it has been infiltrated by a toxic commander from the From Beyond organisation named Ugly Toxic Poison. Joji assembles four more Flamengers, who are all confused over being allegedly recruited as Red Rangers, asking them to sort amongst themselves who gets to be leader whilst he goes to confront Poison. After Joji's noble 'sacrifice', the group decide to let Masayoshi be the leader and confront Poison, who soon grows to enormous size but is defeated by the Flamengers' Flamen Robo.
12	"Documentary! We Are the Flamengers!!"; Transliteration: "Dokyumento! Kore ga Furamenjā da!!" (Japanese: ドキュメント！これがフラメンジャーだ!!)	Yoshimitsu Ōhashi	Yasuto Nishikata	Emi Hirano, Erika Arakawa, Akane Umezu, Kazuma Uike, Shunryō Yamamura, Kumiko Takayanagi, Katsuhiro Kumagai, Masahiro Yamanaka, Masaiku Tayori, Yukinori Umetsu, Eiji Suganuma	January 9, 2014
As the Flamengers continue to defeat monsters from the From Beyond organisation, Masayoshi is still trying to adjust to his role as a team leader. Meanwhile, Mari has been hiding from the public eye at Hidenori's place, feeling she has no place to return to. The Flamengers have a documentary filmed about them as they go against some From Beyond monsters turning cities into an ice age. After defeating two monsters who were holding some kids hostage, they are soon confronted by a large group of monsters, but with some teamwork and new weapons, they overcome them. The team soon act on more friendlier terms with Masayoshi, until they learn there are yet more From Beyond monsters to come.
13	"The Eve of the Final Battle"; Transliteration: "Kessen Zen'ya" (Japanese: 決戦前夜)	Eiji Suganuma	Yūsuke Onoda	Toshie Nakamura, Manabu Nii, Emi Hirano, Akane Umezu, Naoaki Hōjō, Masaki Takasaka, Takao Hasegawa, Yōko Kutsuzawa	January 16, 2014
With From Beyond allegedly sporting over 60,000 monsters at their disposal, Masayoshi finds himself under a lot of stress, particularly when he learns of an all-out attack on Japan being planned for February 7. Joji convinces Prime Minister Shintaro Okuzaki to make an announcement, on the condition it be made after the leaders and their families are evacuated first, giving the Flamengers 24 hours to each choose five people to move to the shelters with them. Whilst going to speak with Hidenori, Masayoshi discovers Mari staying with him and is unable to tell him about the evacuation. As Masayoshi finds he cannot limit his choices to just five, Joji tells him his decision to not tell anyone, only to disappear the next morning. Masayoshi, paranoid that an attack could occur at any moment, decides to make his own announcement during a talkshow appearance.
14	"The Destruction of Japan"; Transliteration: "Nippon Kaimetsu" (Japanese: ニッポン壊滅)	Katsumi Terahigashi	Sayo Aoi	Toshie Nakamura, Emi Hirano, Akane Umezu, Kazuma Uike, Erika Arakawa, Yūji Hakamada, Masahiro Yamanaka, Saka Ikeda, Shunryō Yamamura	January 24, 2014
Just as Masayoshi makes his announcement, members from the From Beyond organisation call all the cellphones in the area, stating they will attack the next morning. After the prime minister declares a state of emergency, Masayoshi is picked up by Sumi and Akira, who had learned of the government's plans. Feeling responsible, Masayoshi makes his own broadcast to encourage the panicked citizens to be heroes in their own way, allowing them to reach shelters without hassle. The next morning, Hidenori brings Moe and Mizuki to his apartment to talk things out with Mari before heading to his post. As From Beyond's attack begins, they bring forth a 'Destruction of Japan Device', which plots to drill into Mt. Fuji, causing it to erupt. Just as things look their worse, Joji returns, bringing with him various tokutatsu heroes to help the fight, encouraging the citizens to fight alongside them. Just as the Flamengers are about to take on the destruction device, Masayoshi receives a call from the From Beyond organisation's final member, Beyond Flamenco, who looks exactly like Masayoshi.
15	"Imitation Justice"; Transliteration: "Imitēshon Jasutisu" (Japanese: イミテーション・ジャスティス)	Akira Satō	Akira Satō, Mitsutoshi Satō	Manabu Nii, Naoaki Hōjō, Wataru Yamamoto, Hitomi Hasegawa, Kumiko Takayanagi, Takao Hasegawa, Masaki Takasaka, Tomokazu Shimabukuro	January 31, 2014
Beyond Flamenco states a lot of cryptic messages, before taking his own life, causing all the From Beyond members to disappear. With the destruction device still running, the Flamengers try to use all their Flamen Robo's weapons to try and stop it, managing to stop it in time and safely escape. With peace returned to Japan, the Flamengers disband and return to their daily lives. Meanwhile, Masayoshi, still curious about Beyond Flamenco's last words, is approached by an American hero named Mr. Justice, who protects him from the Bureau of Peace who are after him and the other Flamengers for some reason. Justice informs Masayoshi that the Japanese government, led by the prime minister, created From Beyond as a means to distract countries from wars and improve their political standing, just like in his country. As the Flamengers were seen as a threat to the Japanese government's plans, they decided to frame the Flamengers for attempting to overthrow the government. Justice helps Masayoshi escape whilst he himself is apprehended, leaving Masayoshi fleeing as he is put on Japan's Most Wanted list.
16	"The Wandering Hero"; Transliteration: "Sasurai no Hīrō" (Japanese: さすらいのヒーロー)	Eiji Suganuma	Michita Shiraishi	Toshie Nakamura, Manabu Nii, Erika Arakawa, Sachiko Sugimoto, Emi Hirano, Kazuma Uike, Katsuhiro Kumagai, Masahiro Yamanaka, Saka Ikeda, Takao Hasegawa, Tomokazu Shimabukuro	February 7, 2014
Mari, who had run off from Moe and Mizuki after backlashing at them, revisits King Torture's hideout, reminding herself of the horrors she and Moe went through and lamenting her own worthlessness. Moe and Mizuki catch up to her and the three manage to make up with each other. Meanwhile, Mazayoshi, who is still in hiding from the authorities and growing weak from hunger, meets a short-sighted homeless man who offers him some food. He explains how when life was treating him badly, it was Samurai Flamenco who taught him to help others. Encouraged by his words, Mazayoshi goes to Hidenori, who has been waiting for him to come seek his help.
17	"The Ultimate Prime Minister"; Transliteration: "Saikyō Sōri" (Japanese: 最強総理)	Atsushi Wakabayashi	Yūsuke Onoda	Yūji Hakamada, Saka Ikeda, Hitomi Hasegawa, Naoaki Hōjō, Akane Umezu, Kazuma Uike	February 14, 2014
Masayoshi escapes with Hidenori and Jun, who have been in contact with each other whilst he was in hiding, arriving at a secret base where Akira awaits, later joined by Mr. Justice. The next day, Masayoshi and Hidenori arrive at the Diet to stop Prime Minister Okuzaki from passing an anti-superhero bill. Okuzaki equips himself with a powerful mech suit, powered by support from the public, and starts attacking Masayoshi, overpowering all of his techniques. Whilst Mari and the others hold off Okuzaki's guards, Hidenori joins the fight but is also beaten. However, Akira manages to stream the action, and Okuzaki's plot, on television to the world, rapidly decreasing his support and weakening his suit, allowing Masayoshi and Hidenori to defeat him. However, it is soon revealed that Mr. Justice is actually an Alien Flamenco, whose race had replaced all the world's leaders, which Okuzaki was trying to put a stop to. Stepping outside, Masayoshi and the others are shocked to find a giant spaceship in the sky.
18	"Flamenco in Space"; Transliteration: "Uchū de Furamenko" (Japanese: 宇宙でフラメンコ)	Miyana Okita	Inuo Inukawa	Manabu Nii, Takao Hasegawa, Emi Hirano, Masahiro Yamanaka, Kazuma Uike, Masaki Takasaka, Kazuyuki Ikai	February 28, 2014
A mysterious being calling himself a Flamencolian appears before Masayoshi and the others, wishing to speak to Masayoshi alone. Despite concerns that he might not make it back alive, Hidenori encourages Masayoshi to go into the Flamencolian's spaceship, where he explains he was the one responsible for King Torture and From Beyond's monsters, believing evolution is the key to universal peace. Unable to persuade him to join their cause, the Flamencolian grows in size to attack Masayoshi, who uses the Flamencolian's evolutionary device to grow in size too, becoming Space Final Flamenco, knocking the Flamencolian into an endless journey into deep space. Stranded on the moon following the battle, Masayoshi is greeted by a being calling itself the universe's will. He explains all of the enemies Masayoshi has faced came because he wished for them, giving him the choice of whether to continue fighting evil, or live on in peace. Masayoshi decides to return to his own world, choosing to keep being a hero not to fight enemies, but to do what is right. After getting to speak with the spirit of his grandfather and learning the somewhat uneventful meaning of "Flamenco", Masayoshi is sent back home where he meets up with Hidenori.
19	"The Quiet Life"; Transliteration: "Shizuka na Seikatsu" (Japanese: 静かな生活)	Katsumi Terahigashi	Yukio Kuroda, Kōji Kobayashi	Hitomi Hasegawa, Yukinori Umetsu, Masaiku Tayori, Katsuhiro Kumagai, Tomokazu Shimabukuro, Kazuyuki Ikai, Yūji Hakamada, Masaki Takasaka	March 7, 2014
Six months has passed and life has been peaceful for Masayoshi, who people are keen to make World President. Meanwhile, Hidenori makes plans to meet up with his girlfriend for a long-awaited date. Upon hearing about this, Mari drags Masayoshi along with him to follow Hidenori to his hometown. There, Hidenori's mother explains that Hidenori had a girlfriend during high school, who disappeared one day and was never found. She then reveals that Hidenori had in fact been sending texts to himself impersonating the girlfriend in order to keep his sanity. As Mari feels downhearted upon learning about this, she spends the evening with Moe and Mizuki. Meanwhile, Masayoshi encounters a boy named Haiji Sawada, who sets off an explosion which destroys Masayoshi's apartment.
20	"Boy From The Past"; Transliteration: "Itsuka Mita Shōnen" (Japanese: いつか見た少年)	Masayuki☆Miyaji	Akira Satō	Hitomi Hasegawa, Masahiro Yamanaka, Masaiku Tayori, Takao Hasegawa, Kazuyuki Ikai, Yūji Hakamada, Masaki Takasaka, Naoaki Hōjō, Akane Umezu, Sachiko Sugimoto, Toshie Nakamura	March 14, 2014
As Masayoshi is left with many questions about Haiji, he receives a call from him whilst staying in a hotel, explaining how he became obsessed with him after witnessing his earliest superhero efforts, deciding he wanted to become his arch nemesis dedicated to doing bad things to Samurai Flamenco. Masayoshi becomes further confused when he hears from the police that Haiji Sawada allegedly died from illness one year ago. The next day, after Haiji tells Masayoshi he intends to do something 'colorful', malicious things are done to the Flamengers, with Jun being pushed down the stairs and Joji being hit by a truck. After receiving more threats from Haiji, Masayoshi meets up with Hidenori, who offers little comfort and even becomes angry when he brings up her missing girlfriend. Upon realising that the only one who has seen or heard Haiji is himself, Masayoshi starts to wonder if he is just imagining him.
21	"Teaching Love"; Transliteration: "Ai o Oshiete" (Japanese: 愛をおしえて)	Katsumi Terahigashi, Wakiichi Yūta	Michita Shiraishi	Hitomi Hasegawa, Masaiku Tayori, Kazuyuki Ikai, Yukinori Umetsu, Shunryō Yamamura, Katsuhiro Kumagai, Emi Hirano, Manabu Nii, Kazuma Uike, Erika Arakawa	March 21, 2014
After being informed about Haiji, Mari steps up on stage for her concert, only to find Moe and Mizuki had been poisoned. Meanwhile, Masayoshi is called to the hospital by Joji, who had heard someone mention Samurai Flamenco before he was hit by the truck, telling him that he needs to learn to love to become stronger. As Masayoshi becomes hung up over what that means, Sumi offers to give him advice about his situation, asking Akira to investigate Haiji before teaching Masayoshi about the various types of love. Meanwhile, Haiji lures Hidenori into a trap and kidnaps him, instructing Masayoshi to go to his old apartment.
22	"Samurai Flamenco, Naked!!"; Transliteration: "Samurai Furemenko, Neikiddo!" (Japanese: サムライフラメンコ・ネイキッド!!)	Eiji Suganuma	Takahiro Omori, Inuo Inukawa	Masahiro Yamanaka, Takao Hasegawa, Masaiku Tayori, Masaki Takasaka, Emi Hirano, Manabu Nii, Naoaki Hōjō, Akane Umezu, Kazuma Uike, Erika Arakawa, Toshie Nakamura	March 28, 2014
Hidenori recalls how he started sending messages to himself after his girlfriend went missing, despite attempts from his mother to get him to stop, eventually joining the police force in the hopes of one day finding her. Back in the present, Haiji attempts to drive Hidenori into killing him by deleting the texts that have kept him going all this time. After hearing from Akira that Haiji had his parents fake his death, Masayoshi arrives at the apartment to confront Haiji, who desires to turn Samurai Flamenco into a 'dark hero' by having Hidenori kill him. Believing fighting him as Samurai Flamenco will not solve anything, Masayoshi strips naked in order to confront him as himself. As Hidenori tries to aim Haiji's gun at him, Masayoshi stands in his way and manages to calm him down in his own way, whilst Mari apprehends Haiji. Six months later, a museum is opened to celebrate heroes, whilst Masayoshi, who occasionally pays visits to Haiji, continues to act as Samurai Flamenco to help solve the little crimes.

=== Manga ===
A manga series written by Seiko Takagi and illustrated by Shō Mizusawa, titled Samurai Flamenco Another Days (サムライフラメンコ Another Days), was serialized in Square Enix's Monthly GFantasy magazine from October 18, 2013, to July 18, 2014. Its chapters were collected in two tankōbon volumes, released on March 27 and September 27, 2014, respectively.

=== Mobile phone game ===
A mobage of Samurai Flamenco was released on February 28, 2014. It works on iPhone, iOS6 and Android. The genre is RPG.

== Reception ==
"Samurai Flamenco has its ups and downs, and the production itself doesn't quite live up to the story it's telling, but there's a solid show here that ranks among the best of the year, and I know I'm not the only one who thinks that."

— Joseph Luster from Otaku USA

The series' early episodes were noted for their depiction of the protagonist confronting non-superpowered criminals and for introducing its core cast, who were often perceived as likeable. While Carl Kimlinger of Anime News Network considered these initial episodes underwhelming, he reported that the series became more engaging as it progressed. Joseph Luster of Otaku USA compared these early installments to the films Kick-Ass and Super, noting Samurai Flamenco utilized similar concepts in a distinct manner. His colleague David Cabrera named it his favorite 2013 series, citing its multiple narrative transitions.

A significant genre shift beginning with episode seven surprised reviewers. Kimlinger remarked that while the new arc might otherwise seem like a "baffling train wreck," its execution was highly effective, praising the integration of character actions with science fiction elements. Luster also reacted positively, observing that this shift provided further development for the protagonist Masayoshi and his allies as they confronted a new threat. Andy Hanley from UK Anime Network, while enjoying these episodes, expressed concern that the story might become overly serious. Reviewing the series' second half, Kimlinger wrote that initial surprise at its twists gave way to a "half-bored curiosity" due to a lack of narrative payoff; he criticized the delivery of certain story arcs and described some plot twists as nonsensical, though he praised the series' humor and its avoidance of stagnation. The animation quality was also criticized, with Hanley singling out episode 11 as particularly poorly animated.
