= The Loneliest =

Single by Måneskin

from the album Rush!
- Released: 7 October 2022
- Genre: Rock; power ballad
- Length: 4:07
- Label: Epic
- Songwriters: Damiano David; Victoria De Angelis; Thomas Raggi; Ethan Torchio; James Abrahart; Jason Evigan; Rami Yacoub; Sarah Hudson; Uzoechi Emenike
- Producers: Fabrizio Ferraguzzo; Måneskin

Måneskin singles chronology
"If I Can Dream" (2022)	"The Loneliest" (2022)	"Gossip" (2023)

Music video
- "The Loneliest" on YouTube

"The Loneliest" is a song by Italian rock band Måneskin, released on 7 October 2022 as the third single from their third studio album Rush! (2023). It debuted at number one in Italy. The song won the MTV Video Music Award for Best Rock Video at the 2023 MTV Video Music Awards.

== Description ==
The song was written by the band members with James Abrahart, Jason Evigan, Rami Yacoub and Sarah Hudson, with production by Fabrizio Ferraguzzo, during a recording session in Los Angeles, California. The frontman Damiano David talked about the meaning of the song:

"The song is somewhere between a love letter and a will. I wrote it at a very difficult time in my life, when I was away from home and the people I love. The idea is: what would I want to say to these people if I were to die? It talks about feelings that everyone can relate to, and we would love to understand how different people understand the lyrics. We are happy that we were able to take some time to write a lot of new music. We chose to come out with this single because it shows a side of us that people haven't seen yet and we wanted to start our new journey from here."

Guitarist Thomas Raggi defined the process of writing the music, saying that he "experimented a lot with the guitar and pedals and I used Igmo, which allowed me to write creatively and give it color," while drummer Ethan Torchio called the production process of "The Loneliest" restorative for the band.

== Promotion ==
On 21 September 2022, Måneskin posted on their social media accounts a video featuring a letter with cursive writing, with the focus on two words: "The Loneliest". Along with the video, the band had announced that a new single from the band was set to be released in October. Two days later, the band officially announced the title of the song.

== Critical reception ==
Italian critic Mattia Marzi of Rockol wrote that "The Loneliest" sounds "hyperclassical" like a "ballad from another time" in terms of sound and narrative structure, finding the lyrics of a "disarming simplicity"; Marzi ended the review by comparing the song with the single "Supermodel", stating that "compared to the California sound and modern rock groove of 'Supermodel', here Maneskin dredges up the airy, orchestral atmospheres of ballads like 'Torna a casa'; [. ...] major pieces of their Italian journey."

Gianni Poglio of Panorama described the song's strengths, finding them in the singer's "focused and effective" performance, production and musicianship, and the guitar solo, defined as "original and melodically flawless." Gabriele Scorsonelli of Il Fatto Quotidiano associated the song with Guns N' Roses' "November Rain", although he noted that "Thomas's guitar solo evokes, in a reference that definitely does not pretend to become a comparison" with the U.S. group, finding it a gesture of "admiration for the historic group."

== Music video ==
The music video for the song, filmed in the Villa Tittoni Traversi in Desio and directed by Tommaso Ottomano, was released on 13 October 2022.

Vogue Italia's Giacomo Aricò wrote that the video has "a strong dark component from the cinematic references typical of the Gothic style," dwelling on the sequence defined as "symbolic" where "the frontman experiences a splitting between his subconscious (where we see him drowning) and reality (where he vomits water at the funeral)." Alessandra De Tommasi for Vanity Fair Italia found that "this almost Burtonian dark-tinged narrative amplifies the power of the song itself" finding the direction "splendid."

== Commercial success ==
"The Loneliest" debuted at the top of Spotify's global weekend chart after totaling more than 4 million plays. After one week, the song debuted at number 53 on the same platform's weekly global chart, marking the highest new entry with 9.5 million streams.

In Italy, the song debuted at number one on the FIMI Top Singles Chart, becoming the band's second single to achieve the feat.

== In popular culture ==
In September 2023, the song was used in the trailer and is the theme song for the anime Onimusha.

== Charts ==
=== Weekly charts ===
Weekly chart performance for "The Loneliest"
Chart (2022–2023)	Peak position
Austria (Ö3 Austria Top 40)	24
Belgium (Ultratop 50 Flanders)	12
Belgium (Ultratop 50 Wallonia)	1
Canada Rock (Billboard)	43
Croatia (HRT)	7
Czech Republic Airplay (ČNS IFPI)	8
Czech Republic Singles Digital (ČNS IFPI)	22
Finland Airplay (Radiosoittolista)	40
France (SNEP)	11
Germany (GfK)	82
Global 200 (Billboard)	75
Greece International (IFPI)	7
Hungary (Rádiós Top 40)	40
Hungary (Single Top 40)	28
Hungary (Stream Top 40)	34
Ireland (IRMA)	88
Israel (Media Forest)	8
Italy (FIMI)	1
Japan Hot Overseas (Billboard Japan)	4
Latvia (EHR)	16
Latvia (LAIPA)	7
Lithuania (AGATA)	2
Luxembourg (Billboard)	16
Netherlands (Dutch Top 40)	6
Netherlands (Single Top 100)	30
New Zealand Hot Singles (RMNZ)	38
Norway (VG-lista)	37
Poland (Polish Airplay Top 100)	7
Poland (Polish Streaming Top 100)	81
Portugal (AFP)	44
San Marino (SMRRTV Top 50)	5
Slovakia Airplay (ČNS IFPI)	29
Slovakia Singles Digital (ČNS IFPI)	22
Sweden (Sverigetopplistan)	48
Switzerland (Schweizer Hitparade)	13
Turkey (Radiomonitor Türkiye)	9
UK Singles Downloads (Official Charts)	40
UK Singles Sales (OCC)	41
US Hot Rock & Alternative Songs (Billboard)	33
US Rock & Alternative Airplay (Billboard)	8

=== Year-end charts ===
2022 year-end chart performance for "The Loneliest"
Chart (2022)	Position
Belgium (Ultratop Flanders)	137
Belgium (Ultratop Wallonia)	145
Italy (FIMI)	76
Netherlands (Dutch Top 40)	63

2023 year-end chart performance for "The Loneliest"
Chart (2023)	Position
Belgium (Ultratop 50 Flanders)	53
Belgium (Ultratop 50 Wallonia)	6
France (SNEP)	33
Italy (FIMI)	89
Netherlands (Dutch Top 40)	49
US Hot Rock & Alternative Songs (Billboard)	100
US Rock Airplay (Billboard)	35

== Certifications ==
Certifications for "The Loneliest"
Region	Certification	Certified units/sales
Austria (IFPI Austria)	Gold	15,000^{‡}
Belgium (BRMA)	Platinum	40,000^{‡}
Brazil (Pro-Música Brasil)	2× Platinum	80,000^{‡}
France (SNEP)	Diamond	333,333^{‡}
Hungary (MAHASZ)	2× Platinum	8,000^{‡}
Italy (FIMI)	3× Platinum	300,000^{‡}
Poland (ZPAV)	Platinum	50,000^{‡}
Spain (Promusicae)	Gold	30,000^{‡}
Switzerland (IFPI Switzerland)	Gold	10,000^{‡}
^{‡} Sales+streaming figures based on certification alone.
