= Honey (Are U Coming?) =

Single by Måneskin

from the album Rush! (Are U Coming?)
- Released: 1 September 2023
- Length: 2:47
- Label: Epic
- Songwriters: Damiano David; Rami Yacoub; Victoria De Angelis; Ethan Torchio; Thomas Raggi; Sylvester Sivertsen; Justin Tranter; Jussi Karvinen; Cleo Tighe
- Producers: Rami Yacoub; Sylvester Sivertsen; Jussi Karvinen

Måneskin singles chronology
| "Baby Said" (2023) | "Honey (Are U Coming?)" (2023) | "Valentine" (2023) |

Music video
- "Honey (Are U Coming?)" on YouTube

"Honey (Are U Coming?)" is a song by Italian rock band Måneskin. It was released on 1 September 2023 through Epic Records, as a single from Rush! (Are U Coming?), the reissue of the band's fourth studio album Rush! (2023). The band performed the song at the 2023 MTV Video Music Awards on 12 September.

== Music video ==
The music video, directed by Tommaso Ottomano was released onto YouTube on 4 September 2023.

== Background and composition ==
The song was announced on August 8, 2023, with a 30-second excerpt posted on the band's official Instagram account.

The song was written by the band's members with Sylvester Sivertsen, Justin Tranter, Jussi Karvinen and Cxloe, at the end of Måneskin's North American's tour between London and Los Angeles. The frontman Damiano David explained the meaning of the song:

"It is the story of a meeting between two people who together see a bit of sadness in each other's eyes, something that makes them feel out of place. It is an invitation to join in a new adventure without actually knowing what awaits them and enjoy the journey".

== Promotion ==
The band performed the song at the 2023 MTV Video Music Awards on 12 September.

== Critical reception ==
Elena Palmieri of Rockol wrote that the single "presents other cues and influences than those recognisable in the group's previous works" in reference to the sounds of Muse's "Time Is Running Out" and The Killers's "Mr. Brightside", with a "rage in the sound" and "a more raw spirit". Valentina Giampieri of GQ Italy defined the song as the band "most successful experiment" showing them "tireless in their desire to experiment with every nuance of rock".

== Charts ==
=== Weekly charts ===
Weekly chart performance for "Honey (Are U Coming?)"
| Chart (2023) | Peak position |
|---|---|
| Austria (Ö3 Austria Top 40) | 47 |
| Canada Rock (Billboard) | 6 |
| CIS (TopHit) | 42 |
| Czech Republic Airplay (ČNS IFPI) | 4 |
| Czech Republic Singles Digital (ČNS IFPI) | 28 |
| Finland Airplay (Radiosoittolista) | 62 |
| France (SNEP) | 140 |
| Germany (GfK) | 80 |
| Global 200 (Billboard) | 170 |
| Greece International (IFPI) | 12 |
| Hungary (Single Top 40) | 33 |
| Italy (FIMI) | 32 |
| Japan Hot Overseas (Billboard Japan) | 1 |
| Latvia (LaIPA) | 6 |
| Lithuania (AGATA) | 20 |
| Netherlands (Single Tip) | 3 |
| Netherlands (Tipparade) | 16 |
| New Zealand Hot Singles (RMNZ) | 14 |
| Poland (Polish Airplay Top 100) | 12 |
| Poland (Polish Streaming Top 100) | 28 |
| Russia Airplay (TopHit) | 22 |
| San Marino (SMRRTV Top 50) | 18 |
| Slovakia Airplay (ČNS IFPI) | 42 |
| Slovakia Singles Digital (ČNS IFPI) | 20 |
| Switzerland (Schweizer Hitparade) | 43 |
| UK Singles (OCC) | 75 |
| US Hot Rock & Alternative Songs (Billboard) | 37 |
| US Rock & Alternative Airplay (Billboard) | 5 |

=== Monthly charts ===
Monthly chart performance for "Honey (Are U Coming?)"
| Chart (2023) | Peak position |
|---|---|
| Russia Airplay (TopHit) | 24 |

=== Year-end charts ===
2023 year-end chart performance for "Honey (Are U Coming?)"
| Chart (2023) | Position |
|---|---|
| Belarus Airplay (TopHit) | 187 |
| Russia Airplay (TopHit) | 178 |

2024 year-end chart performance for "Honey (Are U Coming?)"
| Chart (2024) | Position |
|---|---|
| Belarus Airplay (TopHit) | 159 |
| US Rock Airplay (Billboard) | 39 |

== Certifications ==
Certifications for "Honey (Are U Coming?)"
| Region | Certification | Certified units/sales |
|---|---|---|
| France (SNEP) | Gold | 100,000^{‡} |
| Italy (FIMI) | Gold | 50,000^{‡} |
| Poland (ZPAV) | Platinum | 50,000^{‡} |
^{‡} Sales+streaming figures based on certification alone.

== Release history ==
Release dates and formats for "Honey (Are U Coming?)"
| Region | Date | Format | Label | Ref. |
|---|---|---|---|---|
| Various | 1 September 2023 | Digital download; streaming | Epic | |
| Italy | 1 September 2023 | Radio airplay | Sony | |
