= Simone Bozzelli =

Italian film director

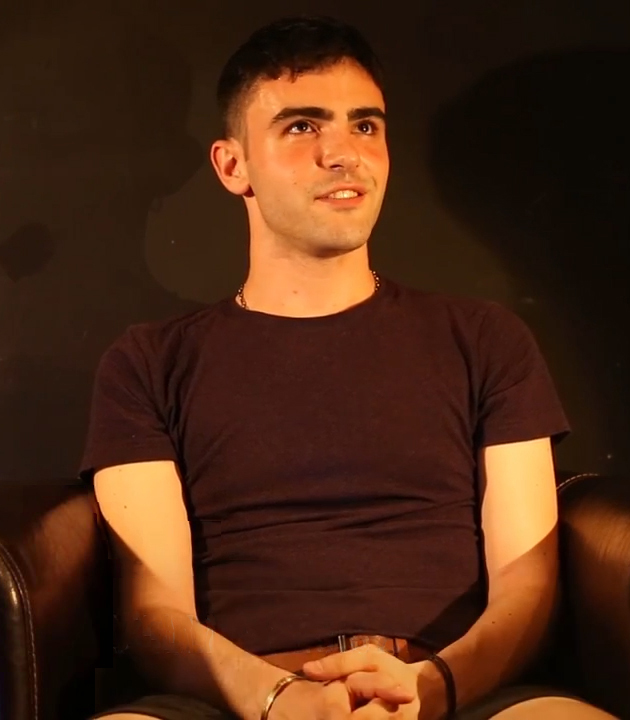
- Born: 1994 (age 31–32)
- Occupation: Film director
- Years active: 2015–present

Simone Bozzelli (born 1994) is an Italian film and music video director.

== Life ==
Bozzelli was born in Silvi. In 2017, he graduated from Milan's Nuova Accademia di Belle Arti with a diploma in Media Design and Multimedia Arts. In 2020, he graduated as a director from Il Centro Sperimentale di Cinematografia in Rome.

In 2019, his short Amateur was screened during the International Critics' Week of the Venice Film Festival. In 2020, he returned to Critics' Week with his short J’ador which won the Best Short award.

His fifth short, Giochi (2021), was presented at the 74th Locarno Film Festival.

In 2021, he directed a music video on I Wanna Be Your Slave by Iggy Pop and Måneskin. It brought Bozzelli the MTV Video Music Award for Best Alternative Video. His other credits as a music video director include We're Friends, Right? for Karin Ann, HIT for Santa Manu, Wrong for Toys in the Attic, etc.

In 2023, he released his feature debut Patagonia (film 2023). The film premiered at the 76th Locarno Film Festival.

== Filmography ==
- 2023 — Patagonia (film 2023) (debut feature)
- 2021 — Giochi (short)
- 2020 — J’ador (short)
- 2019 — Amateur (short)
- 2017 — Loris sta bene (short)
- 2015 — Mio fratello (short)
