= Vent'anni =

Vent'anni may refer to:

- Twenty Years (film) (Italian: Vent'anni), a 1949 Italian comedy film
- Vent'anni (Massimo Ranieri song)
- Vent'anni (Måneskin song)
