= I Wanna Be Your Slave =

- Iggy Pop duet version's single cover

Single by Måneskin

from the album Teatro d'ira: Vol. I
- Released: 16 July 2021
- Studio: Mulino Recording Studio in Acquapendente
- Genre: Hard rock
- Length: 2:53
- Label: Sony; RCA
- Songwriters: Damiano David; Victoria De Angelis; Thomas Raggi; Ethan Torchio
- Producers: Måneskin; Fabrizio Ferraguzzo

Måneskin singles chronology
| "Zitti e buoni" (2021) | "I Wanna Be Your Slave" (2021) | "Mammamia" (2021) |

Alternative covers
- Poster used to promote the music video for the track on social media

Music video
- "I Wanna Be Your Slave" on YouTube

"I Wanna Be Your Slave" (stylized in all caps) is a song by Italian rock band Måneskin, from their second studio album, Teatro d'ira: Vol. I released on 19 March 2021 by Sony. Prior to its release as a single, the song managed to reach top-ten positions on charts across Europe, including number one in Finland and Slovakia, and went viral on the Spotify charts. It is the band's first song to reach the top 5 of the UK Singles Chart, and second to reach top 10 of Billboard Global Excl. U.S. chart.

On 16 July 2021, the song was issued to Italian radio stations as the third single from Teatro d'ira: Vol. I. A duet version featuring American punk-rock singer Iggy Pop was released on 6 August 2021.

== Background and composition ==
The song talks about duality in love relationships, the "obsession and how they're willing to enslave themselves if that's what it takes to win over that special someone." According to lyricist Damiano David, the song "crudely describes all the facets of sexuality and how they can be influential in everyday life. We have inserted some contrasts: 'I'm the devil, I'm a lawyer, I'm a killer, I'm a blonde girl', we want to convey the idea that we don't need to have a single identity, everyone can have many facets."

== Music video ==
On 5 July 2021, the band announced an official music video, which was released on their YouTube channel on 15 July. It was directed by Simone Bozzelli and produced by Think|Cattleya. It presents "voyeuristic loop", where "forbidden desires are matched with sacrifice." The video won the Best Alternative category at the 2022 MTV Video Music Awards.

== Commercial performance ==
After the band's win at the Eurovision Song Contest 2021, "I Wanna Be Your Slave" became viral on weekly charts and Spotify charts, in part thanks to their live performance recorded at the Acquapendente studio, where the band recorded their second studio album Teatro d'ira: Vol. I, and shared for the Wiwi Jam at Home concert hosted by Wiwibloggs. First peaking at number 12 on the UK Singles Chart, the song surpassed the peak of the band's previous single "Zitti e buoni" (number 17), thus making Måneskin the first Eurovision-winning act since Celine Dion to have two songs in the UK top 40. On 15 June 2021, the song peaked at number one on the UK's Official Trending Chart and gained four positions on the midweek singles chart passing from number 12 to number 8, peaking at number 7 on the weekly chart, becoming the band's first song to reach the UK top 10. In the next week it advanced to number 6. In its sixth charting week it became the band's first UK top 5 hit.

The song reached number one in Finland and Slovakia, and also reached the top 10 in the band's native country of Italy as well as in Austria, Czech Republic, Denmark, Germany, Greece, Ireland, Lithuania, Netherlands, New Zealand, Norway, Sweden and Switzerland. By 15 June 2021, the song was streamed 5.8 million times in the UK across both audio and video plays, and more than 61 million times on Spotify. On 21 June, the song became the band's second song to reach top 10 of the Billboard Global Excl. U.S. chart, later peaking at number 8. It topped the Billboard's US Hot Hard Rock Songs chart week of 26 June 2021.

== Charts ==
=== Weekly charts ===
2021 weekly chart performance for "I Wanna Be Your Slave"
| Chart (2021) | Peak position |
|---|---|
| Australia (ARIA) | 15 |
| Austria (Ö3 Austria Top 40) | 2 |
| Belgium (Ultratop 50 Flanders) | 7 |
| Belgium (Ultratop 50 Wallonia) | 49 |
| Canada Hot 100 (Billboard) | 29 |
| Canada Rock (Billboard) | 6 |
| CIS Airplay (TopHit) | 152 |
| Croatia International Airplay (Top lista) | 16 |
| Czech Republic Singles Digital (ČNS IFPI) | 2 |
| Denmark (Tracklisten) | 7 |
| Euro Digital Song Sales (Billboard) | 10 |
| Finland (Suomen virallinen lista) | 1 |
| France (SNEP) | 71 |
| Germany (GfK) | 3 |
| Global 200 (Billboard) | 13 |
| Greece International (IFPI) | 2 |
| Hungary (Single Top 40) | 7 |
| Hungary (Stream Top 40) | 2 |
| Iceland (Tónlistinn) | 8 |
| Ireland (IRMA) | 4 |
| Israel International Airplay (Media Forest) | 4 |
| Italy (FIMI) | 7 |
| Japan Hot Overseas (Billboard) | 9 |
| Lithuania (AGATA) | 2 |
| Netherlands (Single Top 100) | 3 |
| New Zealand (Recorded Music NZ) | 21 |
| Norway (VG-lista) | 2 |
| Poland Airplay (ZPAV) | 4 |
| Portugal (AFP) | 13 |
| Russia Airplay (TopHit) | 195 |
| San Marino Airplay (SMRTV Top 50) | 32 |
| Slovakia Singles Digital (ČNS IFPI) | 1 |
| South Africa Streaming (RISA) | 24 |
| Spain (Promusicae) | 47 |
| Sweden (Sverigetopplistan) | 4 |
| Switzerland (Schweizer Hitparade) | 6 |
| UK Singles (OCC) | 5 |
| US Bubbling Under Hot 100 (Billboard) | 7 |
| US Hot Rock & Alternative Songs (Billboard) | 11 |
| US Rock & Alternative Airplay (Billboard) | 28 |

2026 weekly chart performance for "I Wanna Be Your Slave"
| Chart (2026) | Peak position |
|---|---|
| Russia Streaming (TopHit) | 96 |

=== Year-end charts ===
Year-end chart performance for "I Wanna Be Your Slave"
| Chart (2021) | Position |
|---|---|
| Austria (Ö3 Austria Top 40) | 14 |
| Belgium (Ultratop Flanders) | 53 |
| Canada (Canadian Hot 100) | 83 |
| Denmark (Tracklisten) | 45 |
| Germany (Official German Charts) | 25 |
| Global 200 (Billboard) | 76 |
| Hungary (Single Top 40) | 44 |
| Hungary (Stream Top 40) | 13 |
| Ireland (IRMA) | 46 |
| Italy (FIMI) | 16 |
| Lithuania (AGATA) | 76 |
| Netherlands (Single Top 100) | 62 |
| Norway (VG-lista) | 33 |
| Poland (ZPAV) | 34 |
| Portugal (AFP) | 74 |
| Sweden (Sverigetopplistan) | 34 |
| Switzerland (Schweizer Hitparade) | 42 |
| UK Singles (OCC) | 40 |
| US Hot Rock & Alternative Songs (Billboard) | 26 |

== Certifications ==
Certifications for "I Wanna Be Your Slave"
| Region | Certification | Certified units/sales |
|---|---|---|
| Australia (ARIA) | Platinum | 70,000^{‡} |
| Austria (IFPI Austria) | 3× Platinum | 90,000^{‡} |
| Belgium (BRMA) | Platinum | 40,000^{‡} |
| Brazil (Pro-Música Brasil) | Diamond | 160,000^{‡} |
| Canada (Music Canada) | 3× Platinum | 240,000^{‡} |
| Denmark (IFPI Danmark) | Platinum | 90,000^{‡} |
| France (SNEP) | Diamond | 333,333^{‡} |
| Germany (BVMI) | Platinum | 400,000^{‡} |
| Hungary (MAHASZ) | 10× Platinum | 40,000^{‡} |
| Italy (FIMI) | 4× Platinum | 400,000^{‡} |
| Mexico (AMPROFON) | Platinum | 140,000^{‡} |
| New Zealand (RMNZ) | 2× Platinum | 60,000^{‡} |
| Norway (IFPI Norway) | Platinum | 60,000^{‡} |
| Poland (ZPAV) | 4× Platinum | 200,000^{‡} |
| Portugal (AFP) | Platinum | 10,000^{‡} |
| Spain (Promusicae) | Platinum | 60,000^{‡} |
| United Kingdom (BPI) | Platinum | 600,000^{‡} |
| United States (RIAA) | Platinum | 1,000,000^{‡} |
Streaming
| Greece (IFPI Greece) | Platinum | 2,000,000^{†} |
| Sweden (GLF) | 2× Platinum | 16,000,000^{†} |
^{‡} Sales+streaming figures based on certification alone.^{†} Streaming-only figures based on certification alone.

== Release history ==
Release history for "I Wanna Be Your Slave"
| Region | Date | Format(s) | Version | Label | Ref. |
|---|---|---|---|---|---|
| Italy | 16 July 2021 | Radio airplay | Original | Sony Italy | |
| United States | 27 July 2021 | Alternative radio | Original | Arista | |
| Various | 6 August 2021 | 7-inch single; digital download; streaming | with Iggy Pop | Epic; Sony Italy | |
| Italy | 6 August 2021 | Radio airplay | with Iggy Pop | Sony Italy | |
| United States | 24 February 2022 (Note: Release as a promotional single.) | AC radio; contemporary hit radio; digital download; hot AC radio; modern AC radio | Original | Arista | |
| United States | 1 March 2022 | Alternative radio (re-release) | Original | Arista | |
