= Zitti e buoni =

2021 song by Måneskin

Single by Måneskin

from the album Teatro d'ira: Vol. I
- Language: Italian
- Released: 3 March 2021
- Genre: Glam rock; punk rock; hard rock
- Length: 3:12 (original); 3:03 (Eurovision version)
- Label: Sony; RCA
- Songwriters: Damiano David; Victoria De Angelis; Ethan Torchio; Thomas Raggi
- Producers: Måneskin; Fabrizio Ferraguzzo

Måneskin singles chronology
"Vent'anni" (2020)	"Zitti e buoni" (2021)	"I Wanna Be Your Slave" (2021)

Music video
- "Zitti e buoni" on YouTube

Eurovision Song Contest 2021 entry
- Country: Italy
- Artists: Damiano David; Ethan Torchio; Thomas Raggi; Victoria De Angelis
- As: Måneskin

Finals performance
- Final result: 1st
- Final points: 524

Entry chronology
- ◄ "Fai rumore" (2020)
- "Brividi" (2022) ►

Official performance video
- "Zitti e buoni" (First Semi-Final) on YouTube "Zitti e buoni" (Grand Final) on YouTube "Zitti e buoni" (Reprise) on YouTube

"Zitti e buoni" (Italian: [ˈdzitti e bˈbwɔːni, ˈtsi-]; lit. 'Quiet and well-behaved') (Note: The title is part of the line Vi conviene stare zitti e buoni, which translates into English as "You'd better be quiet and good" or "You'd better shut up and behave", with a plural "you".) is a song written and performed by Italian rock band Måneskin. It was produced by the band alongside Fabrizio Ferraguzzo, and won the Sanremo Music Festival and the Eurovision Song Contest 2021. The song was the band's commercial breakthrough in global music charts and topped the singles chart in several European countries. It peaked at number 17 on the UK Singles Chart, becoming the first Italian-language song in 30 years to enter the UK Top 20. It also reached top 10 of the Billboard Global Excl. US chart.

== Background ==
=== Composition ===
"Zitti e buoni" was written and produced by all of Måneskin's members – Damiano David, Ethan Torchio, Thomas Raggi, and Victoria De Angelis – with Fabrizio Ferraguzzo credited as a producer. The song's initial ballad version was written in 2016, but was gradually reworked into a rock song through the years. Måneskin spoke of the title as "referring to a cathartic anger, our anger transformed into something positive, which leads to change things".

The song was written in E minor, with David's vocals spanning from E3 to A5. As highlighted by critics, the lyrics represent a criticism aimed at the generations of adults who do not understand or value the young adults who are invited by the quartet to not lower their heads, and to be the truest version of themselves. According to NME, "lyrically, the song deals in themes of 'challenging prejudices' and 'finding redemption' – ideas that lay at the core of Måneskin and their overall message". As described at Wiwibloggs, the song "is a manifesto for those who want to move forward by treasuring their uniqueness. Never mind who's talking (without knowing what they're saying)." The lyrics also reference the Greek myth of Icarus ("Con ali in cera alla schiena/Ricercherò quell'altezza"; "With wax wings on my back I'll seek that height").

=== Release ===
The song was released on 3 March 2021 to digital download, streaming media, and Italian contemporary hit radio stations. On 7 May 2021, an acoustic version of the song was uploaded on YouTube.

The music video was directed by Simone Peluso, and premiered on 3 March 2021 via Måneskin's YouTube channel. By 27 March 2022, the video gathered 128 million views, with an additional 83 million views from the Eurovision Song Contest's YouTube channel. By 15 June, cumulative views surpassed 54 million.

=== Sanremo ===
On 6 March 2021, "Zitti e buoni" performed by the band won the "Big Artists" section of the 71st edition of the Sanremo Music Festival, winning almost one-third of demoscopic jury votes (32.97%), the highest press jury (35.16%), and public votes (53.53%) for an average score of 40.68%, ahead of Francesca Michielin and Fedez's "Chiamami per nome" (30.49%) and Ermal Meta's "Un milione di cose da dirti" (28.83%). Enrico Melozzi arranged and conducted the Sanremo Orchestra during their performance. As the festival was used by Radiotelevisione italiana (RAI) to select its song and performer for the 65th edition of the Eurovision Song Contest, the song became the Italian entrant, and Måneskin the performers, for Eurovision.

=== Eurovision ===
As Italy is a member of the "Big Five", the song automatically advanced to the final of the Eurovision Song Contest, held on 22 May 2021 at the Rotterdam Ahoy in Rotterdam, Netherlands. For the song to participate in Eurovision, some lyrics were changed because of profanity (words such as coglioni and cazzo were removed), to the band's displeasure but understanding the discussion on "common sense". The version performed at Eurovision also removes part of the music in the introduction and second verse to fit it into three minutes.

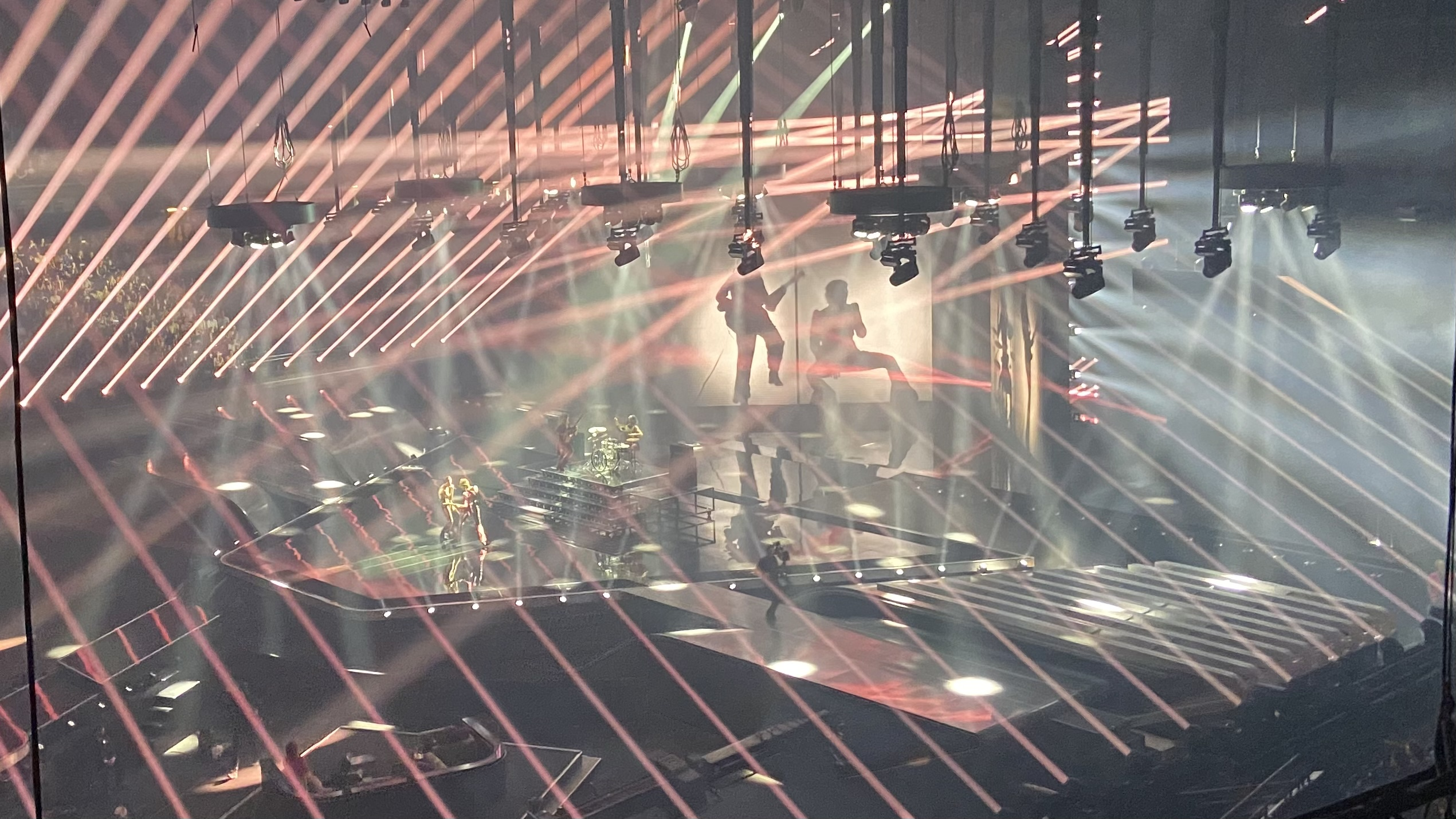
The band performing during the Eurovision first semi-final dress rehearsal

During the energetic performances in Eurovision, the band members wore custom-made glam rock leather outfits designed by Italian fashion brand Etro, and boots by Christian Louboutin. The outfits were described as "Jimi Hendrix-meets Velvet Goldmine" by The New York Times.

As the favorite for victory, the song won the contest with a total of 524 points (318 from televoting and 206 from jury score), 25 points ahead of "Voilà" by French singer Barbara Pravi. The song received the maximum of 12 points from judges from Croatia, Georgia, Slovenia, and Ukraine, and from Bulgarian, Maltese, Sammarinese, Serbian, and Ukrainian televoters. It was the first time since Finland in Eurovision 2006 that a group had won the contest with an atypical contesting music genre, and it was Italy's first victory since 1990. It was also the first time since Germany in Eurovision 2010 that a "Big Five" nation had won the contest. Except for David, the rest of the members became the first artists born after 2000 to win the Eurovision Song Contest.

In their winners reprise performance, Måneskin performed the uncensored version of the song. David remarked in his speech, "We just want to say to the whole Europe, to the whole world, rock 'n' roll never dies!" The media also took note of the kiss exchanged among David, Raggi, and Torchio on the reprise performance, but as explained by David, it was a "spontaneous" gesture to challenge stereotypes and in support of the LGBT community.

=== Aftermath ===
After their Eurovision win, the band received congratulations from the President, the Government, and the Italian media, where the win and a sense of joy were described as a reminiscence of the time when the Italy national football team won the 2006 FIFA World Cup.

By 3 June 2021, the performance in the Grand Final had gathered more than 44 million views on YouTube, which by 15 June increased to 54 million, becoming the most watched live performance on the Eurovision official channel.

== Critical reception ==
Måneskin received widespread acclaim for their Eurovision performance and song, with NME describing it as "undeniable rock stomper with a hint of Franz Ferdinand in its slick guitar riffs", and The Guardian stating that is refreshing to hear an "authentic and strutting rock sound... Damiano David's stream of Italian lyricism sounds sensually badass over it all" on such a stage and age of digital audio music." The band was praised by many Italian rock and pop artists like Vasco Rossi and Laura Pausini, and international rock artists like Alex Kapranos of Franz Ferdinand, Steven Van Zandt of Bruce Springsteen's E Street Band, and Simon Le Bon of Duran Duran. Rossi became especially fond of them, saying that they, along with him, are the last Italian rock rebels trying to make Italian rock to dispel the usual stereotype about Italian music. Morgan considered them as the excellence of current Italian rock who helped the genre come out of its inferiority complex.

== Track listing ==
Digital download / streaming media

1. "Zitti e buoni" – 3:13

== Credits and personnel ==
Credits adapted from Tidal.

- Måneskin – production:
  - Damiano David – songwriting, vocals
  - Victoria De Angelis – songwriting, bass
  - Thomas Raggi – songwriting, guitars
  - Ethan Torchio – songwriting, drums
- Fabrizio Ferraguzzo – production

== Commercial performance ==
"Zitti e buoni" peaked at number two on the Italian Singles Chart and was certified quintuple platinum by FIMI. Immediately after winning Sanremo, it debuted at number 106 on the Billboard Global Excl. US chart, six spots under the Sanremo runner-up "Chiamami per nome". Immediately after winning Eurovision, it reached the Top 10 on the Spotify Global Chart, number one in many countries, and became the most-streamed Italian song ever in one day on the platform. On 27 May, it surpassed 45 million streams, which cumulatively increased to 100 million streams by mid-June. In the following charting week, on 28 May, the single began to enter the weekly charts across Europe, peaking in its chart run at number one in Finland, Greece, Lithuania, Netherlands and Sweden. It topped the UK Rock & Metal Singles Chart for seven consecutive weeks, and peaked at number 17 on the UK Singles Chart, being the highest-charting Eurovision winning song there since Måns Zelmerlöw's "Heroes" in 2015, and the first Italian-language song in 30 years to enter the UK Top 20 after Zucchero Fornaciari's "Miserere" in 1992. In the week of 5 June 2021, it debuted at number 26 on Billboard Global 200 and achieved a new peak of 11 on Billboard Global Excl. US The following week, the song reached new peaks of 22 and 10, respectively.

=== Weekly charts ===
2021–2023 weekly chart performance for "Zitti e buoni"
Chart (2021–2023)	Peak position
Austria (Ö3 Austria Top 40)	2
Belgium (Ultratop 50 Flanders)	2
Belgium (Ultratop 50 Wallonia)	43
Croatia International Airplay (Top lista)	3
Czech Republic Singles Digital (ČNS IFPI)	6
Denmark (Tracklisten)	18
Euro Digital Songs (Billboard)	2
Finland (Suomen virallinen lista)	1
France (SNEP)	107
Germany (GfK)	9
Global 200 (Billboard)	22
Greece International (IFPI)	1
Hungary (Single Top 40)	15
Hungary (Stream Top 40)	6
Iceland (Tónlistinn)	9
Ireland (IRMA)	12
Israel International Airplay (Media Forest)	11
Italy (FIMI)	2
Latvia Streaming (LaIPA)	13
Lithuania (AGATA)	1
Netherlands (Dutch Top 40)	19
Netherlands (Single Top 100)	1
New Zealand Hot Singles (RMNZ)	26
Norway (VG-lista)	2
Poland (Antyradio)	1
Portugal (AFP)	4
San Marino Airplay (SMRTV Top 50)	20
Slovakia (Singles Digitál Top 100)	8
Slovenia Airplay (SloTop50)	33
Spain (Promusicae)	16
Sweden (Sverigetopplistan)	1
Switzerland (Schweizer Hitparade)	2
UK Singles (Official Charts)	17
UK Rock & Metal (Official Charts)	1
US Hot Hard Rock Songs (Billboard)	7
US World Digital Song Sales (Billboard)	7

2025 weekly chart performance for "Zitti e buoni"
Chart (2025)	Peak position
Russia Streaming (TopHit)	96

=== Year-end charts ===
Year-end chart performance for "Zitti e buoni"
Chart (2021)	Position
Austria (Ö3 Austria Top 40)	66
Belgium (Ultratop Flanders)	65
Hungary (Stream Top 40)	69
Italy (FIMI)	4
Lithuania (AGATA)	51
Netherlands (Single Top 100)	80
Sweden (Sverigetopplistan)	57
Switzerland (Schweizer Hitparade)	67
Portugal (AFP)	134

=== Certifications ===
Certifications for "Zitti e buoni"
Region	Certification	Certified units/sales
Austria (IFPI Austria)	Platinum	30,000^{‡}
Belgium (BRMA)	Platinum	40,000^{‡}
Brazil (Pro-Música Brasil)	Platinum	40,000^{‡}
Denmark (IFPI Danmark)	Gold	45,000^{‡}
France (SNEP)	Gold	100,000^{‡}
Germany (BVMI)	Gold	200,000^{‡}
Italy (FIMI)	5× Platinum	350,000^{‡}
Mexico (AMPROFON)	Gold	70,000^{‡}
Norway (IFPI Norway)	Platinum	60,000^{‡}
Poland (ZPAV)	2× Platinum	100,000^{‡}
Portugal (AFP)	Gold	5,000^{‡}
Spain (Promusicae)	Platinum	60,000^{‡}
Switzerland (IFPI Switzerland)	Platinum	20,000^{‡}
United Kingdom (BPI)	Silver	200,000^{‡}
Streaming
Greece (IFPI Greece)	3× Platinum	6,000,000^{†}
Sweden (GLF)	2× Platinum	16,000,000^{†}
^{‡} Sales+streaming figures based on certification alone.^{†} Streaming-only figures based on certification alone.

== Release history ==
Release history and formats for "Zitti e buoni"
Region	Date	Format	Label	Ref.
Various	3 March 2021	Digital download; streaming	Sony	
Italy	3 March 2021	Contemporary hit radio	Sony	

== Notes ==
Preceded by "Arcade" by Duncan Laurence	Eurovision Song Contest winners 2021	Succeeded by "Stefania" by Kalush Orchestra
