= Victoria De Angelis =

Italian bassist (born 2000)

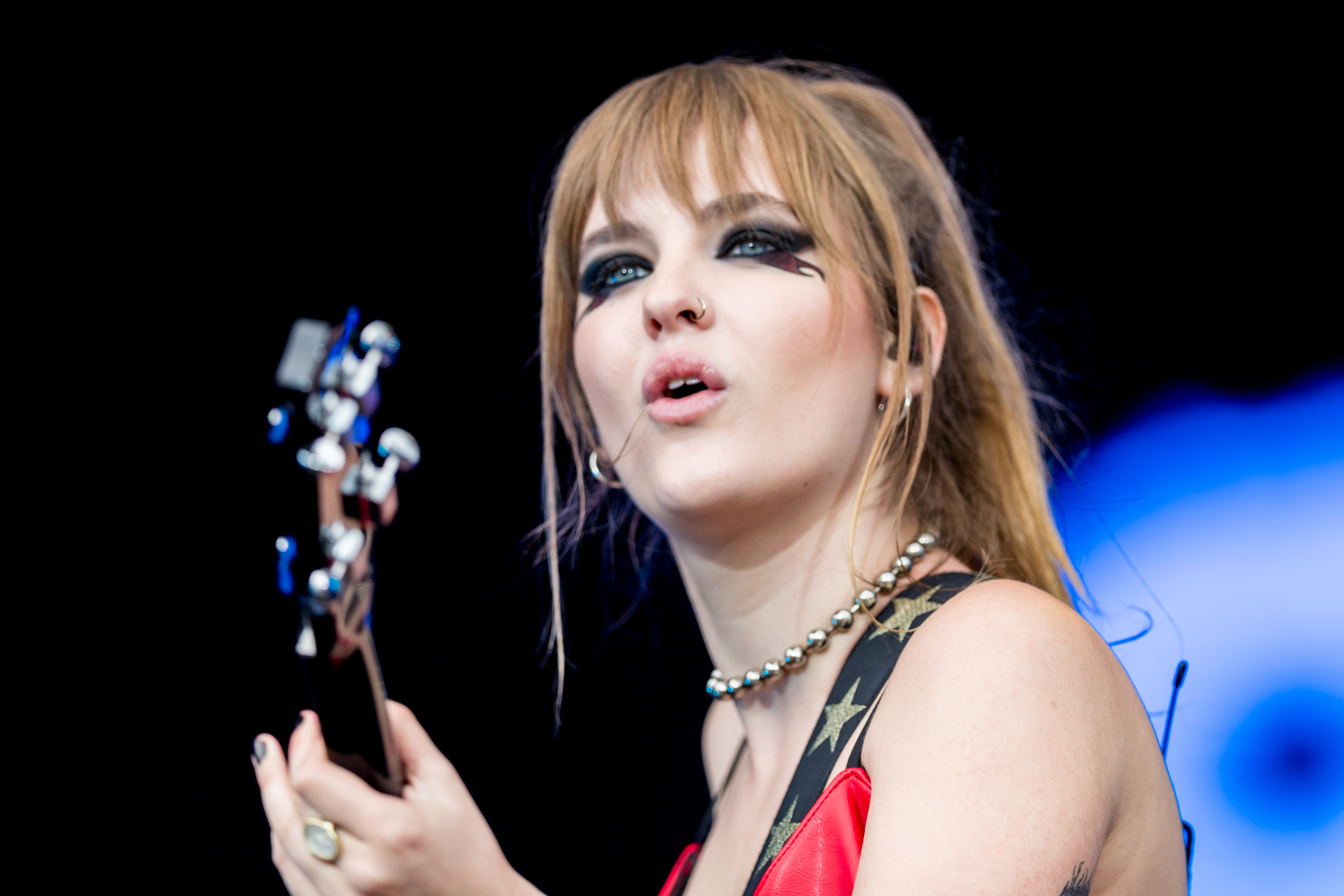
- De Angelis in 2022

Background information
- Born: Victoria De Angelis; 28 April 2000 (age 26); Rome, Italy
- Genres: Techno; house; pop rock; alternative rock; glam rock; funk rock
- Occupations: Musician; songwriter; producer; DJ
- Instruments: Bass guitar; vocals
- Years active: 2016–present
- Labels: Universal; Polydor; A&M; Interscope
- Member of: Måneskin

Victoria De Angelis (Italian: [vikˈtɔːrja de ˈandʒelis], Danish: [vikˈtsʰoɐ̯ˀi.æ te ˈɑnɕe̝lis, vikˈtsʰoɐ̯ˀjæ]; born 28 April 2000), also known mononymously as Victoria, is an Italian bass player, songwriter, producer, and DJ. She founded the rock band Måneskin in 2016 in Rome alongside guitarist Thomas Raggi, lead vocalist Damiano David, and drummer Ethan Torchio, with whom she won the Sanremo Music Festival 2021 and subsequently the Eurovision Song Contest 2021 for Italy with the song "Zitti e buoni". In 2024, De Angelis started her solo musical career with the single "Get Up Bitch! Shake Ya Ass", a collaboration with Brazilian singer Anitta.

== Early life ==
De Angelis was born in Rome to a Danish mother and an Italian father. Her mother died from cancer when she was 15. She has a sister who is three years younger. From a young age, according to her, rock music embodied a desire for freedom. Having had a passion and fondness for music since childhood, De Angelis started playing guitar at the age of 8 and began playing bass in the seventh grade.

During an interview for Elle, she revealed she suffered from panic attacks at age 14, which caused her to miss a year of school. De Angelis attended the middle school Scuola Media Gianicolo where she met fellow band member and guitarist Thomas Raggi and later on completed her schooling at Liceo Scientifico J.F. Kennedy. De Angelis has cited Nick O'Malley and Kim Gordon as her influences.

== Career ==
De Angelis and Thomas Raggi first met during middle school. They were later joined by Damiano David when attending high school in Rome. Ethan Torchio who lived in nearby Frosinone joined them when they advertised for a drummer on Facebook to complete the line-up.

Although De Angelis and Raggi first formed the band in 2015, it was not until 2016 that it was made official when the members had to choose the band's name because they had decided to register for Pulse, a local music contest for emerging bands. While brainstorming, De Angelis, who is half Danish, was asked by her bandmates to toss out some Danish words, and they agreed on Måneskin ("Moonlight").

They later performed as buskers in the streets of the Colli Portuensi district of Rome, and in 2017, they rose to prominence when they finished second in the eleventh season of the Italian talent show X Factor. The band had a breakthrough debut with the studio album Il ballo della vita and tour in 2018 and 2019. In 2021, their second studio album Teatro d'ira: Vol. I was released. The same year, the band won the Eurovision Song Contest. On 20 January 2023, their third studio album Rush! was released through Epic Records.

In 2023, Duran Duran released a cover of Talking Heads' "Psycho Killer", featuring De Angelis on guest bass and vocals. In 2024, after finishing her first world tour with Måneskin, De Angelis embarked on a tour in Europe and the United States as a solo DJ act, performing a variety of high-tempo electronic music genres. Her debut solo single, a collaboration with Brazilian singer Anitta titled "Get Up Bitch! Shake Ya Ass", was released on 30 August.

== Personal life ==
De Angelis is a lesbian, having previously identified as bisexual, saying her identity is developing. She is in a relationship with model Luna Passos.

== Discography ==
=== Singles ===
==== As lead artist ====
List of singles as lead artist, showing year released and album name
Title	Year	Chart positions	Album
Title	Year	POR	Album
"Get Up Bitch! Shake Ya Ass" (with Anitta)	2024	192	Non-album singles
"Ratata"	2024	–	Non-album singles
"Whistle"	2025	–	Non-album singles
"T-Shirt" (featuring Tommy Genesis and Miss Bashful)	2025	–	Non-album singles
"Daddy" (featuring Ashnikko)	2025	–	Non-album singles
"Clubhouse" (with MCR-T and Six Sex)	2025	–	Club Erotica
"Killa" (featuring Pabllo Vittar and Isabella Lovestory)	2025	–	Non-album single
"—" denotes items which did not chart in that country.

==== As a featured artist ====
List of singles as a featured artist, showing year released and album name
Title	Year	Album
"Psycho Killer" (Duran Duran featuring Victoria De Angelis)	2023	Danse Macabre

=== Mixes ===
List of mixes and showing year released
Title	Year
"Victoria's Treat"	2024
"AK Sports"	2024
"Miss Bitch 2.0"	2024

=== Remixes ===
List of remixes and showing original artists, year released and album name
Title	Original artist(s)	Year	Album
"Guess Remixxx"	Charli xcx featuring Billie Eilish	2024	Non-commercial release
"Baby G (Victoria remix)"	Brutalismus 3000	2025	Goodbye Salò Remixes
"Pound Town (Victoria remix)"	Skream and Partiboi69	2025	Non-album remix

== Tours ==
=== As a soloist ===
- Victoria (2024)

=== With Måneskin ===
- Il Ballo della Vita Tour (2018–2019)
- Loud Kids Tour (2022–2023)
- Rush! World Tour (2023)
