= Primavera Sound =

Annual music festival held in Barcelona

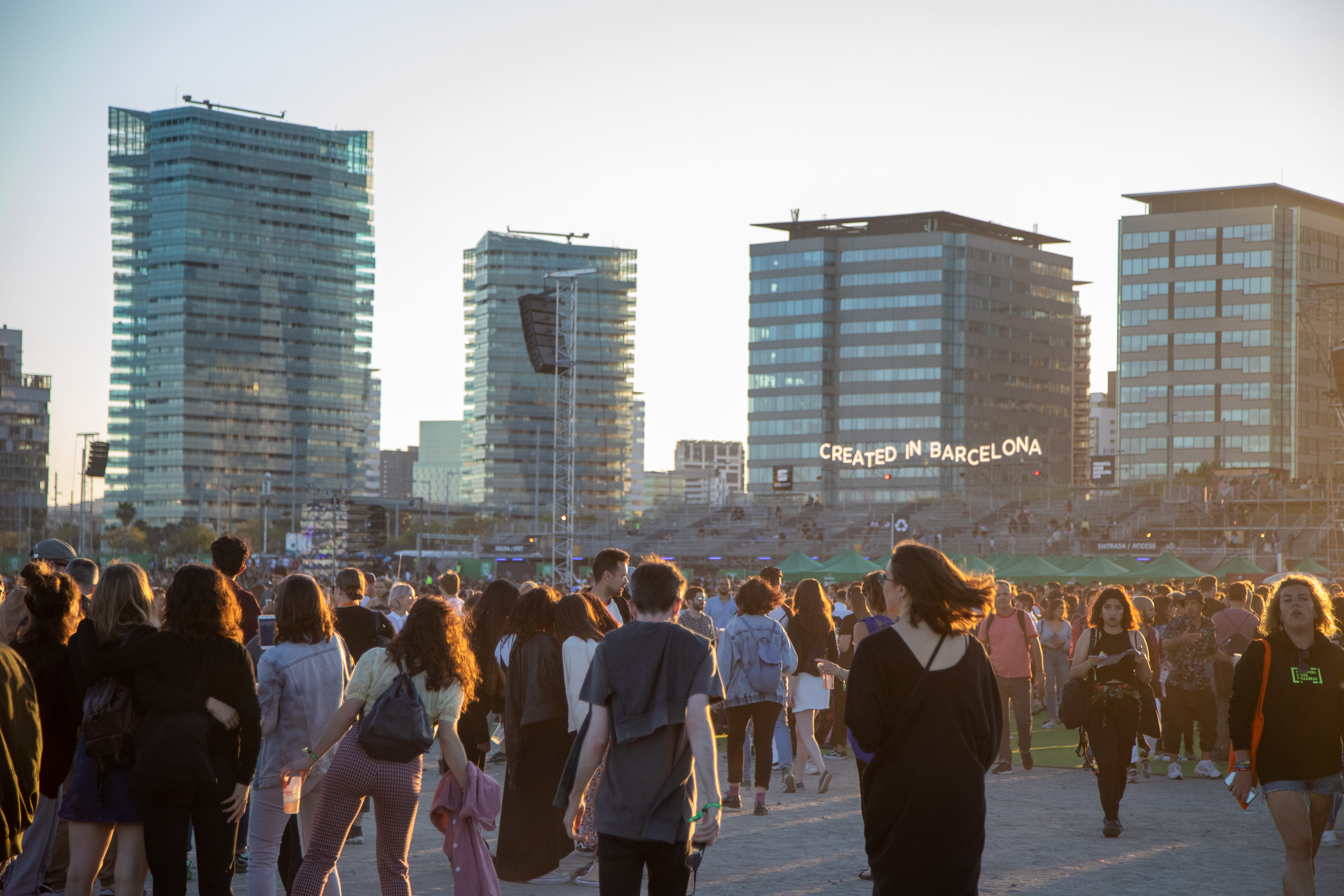
- Primavera Sound in 2019
- Genre: Indie rock
- Dates: Late May-early June
- Locations: Parc del Fòrum, Barcelona (2005–2019, 2022–present); Previous; Poble Espanyol, Barcelona (2001–2004); International spin-offs For full list, see here
- Coordinates: 41°24′38″N 2°13′35″E 41.410666, 2.226342
- Years active: 2001–2019; 2022–present
- Founders: Pablo Soler, Gabriel Ruiz, Sònia Saura
- Attendance: 293,000
- Capacity: 75,000
- Website: primaverasound.com

Primavera Sound (commonly referred to as Primavera) is an annual music festival held at the Parc del Fòrum in Barcelona, Catalonia, Spain, during late May and early June. It was founded in 2001 by Pablo Soler, Gabriel Ruiz and Sònia Saura as "a showcase for Spanish noise bands", originally held at the Poble Espanyol before moving to the Parc del Fòrum, a much larger site on the seafront, in 2005. It is one of the largest and most-attended music festivals in Europe and the biggest in the Mediterranean.

The festival's image was originally oriented around indie rock, but in recent years has seen a larger presence of genres such as hip hop, electronic dance music and pop. In contrast to most other European festivals, traditionally the first bands go on at 4:00 pm, the headliners begin at midnight, and the latest acts play until 6:00 a.m. Beginning in 2019, Primavera Sound became the world's first major music festival to achieve gender-equal lineups under the tagline "The New Normal". It was also the first to use exclusively mobile tickets.

Originally a one-day event, a second day was added beginning in 2002, and the 2004 edition became the first to feature a three-day lineup. In 2008, the festival began hosting free shows for ticketholders in local venues across Barcelona, beginning a tradition now known as Primavera a la Ciutat. No festival was held in 2020 and 2021 due to the COVID-19 pandemic. It returned in 2022 with a two-week format for the first time, combining most bookings from the missed years, before reverting to a one-week event in 2023.

The success of the festival led to an international expansion to Porto in 2012 at the Parque da Cidade, which takes place a week after the main edition. The festival began to hold North and South American editions in 2022. In 2023, a nearly identical lineup was also featured in Madrid.

Sonic Youth, Wilco, PJ Harvey and the National have all headlined the main festival a record four times, while Pixies, Nick Cave and the Bad Seeds, Interpol, Pulp and My Bloody Valentine have done so three times.

Each Primavera Sound between 2009 and 2022 set new attendance records, growing from its small origins of just 7,700 tickets sold in 2001. The 2022 festival was visited by 460,500 people, the fourth-most attended music festival in the world that year, while generating €349 million in revenue for the city of Barcelona. The New York Times noted in 2014 that "the festival is sometimes called the Coachella of Europe", but without the "celebrity spotting" and "fashion and marketing trends" that the American festival is known for.

== History ==
=== 2001–2004: Beginnings at Poble Espanyol ===
The name "Primavera Sound" was first used for a series of concerts held at the Sala KGB venue in Barcelona in 1994, the first on 9 April. It continued to promote local indie and noise shows in Spain throughout the 1990s, but founder Pablo Soler was able to take the name back for a festival that he began planning in 2000. The first edition was held on 28 April 2001 at the Poble Espanyol, an open-air architectural museum on top of the Montjuïc hill. It featured four stages and 19 acts including Armand van Helden, Carl Craig, Los Planetas, Unkle and Yasuharu Konishi, the former frontman of Japanese band Pizzicato Five. Soler said he wanted to start the festival "as a showcase for Spanish noise bands." The festival differed from most of its other European counterparts like Glastonbury by being held within a city rather than in a large camping site. A ticket cost 5,000 peseta (€30).

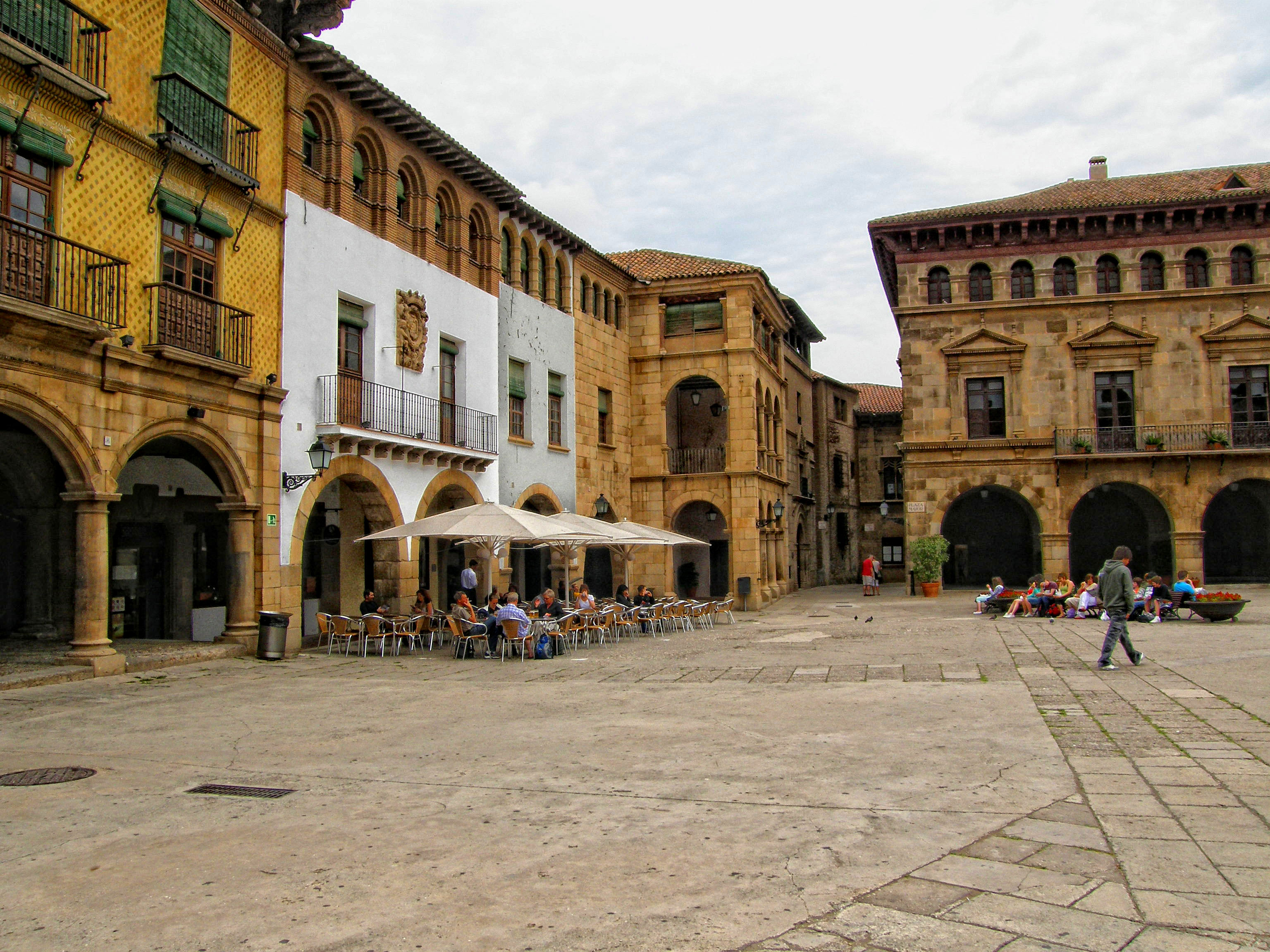
Poble Espanyol (2001-04)

Primavera Sound expanded to a second day in 2002, which took place on 17 and 18 May. Friday's headliners were Pulp and Spiritualized, while Saturday was headlined by Echo & the Bunnymen and Tindersticks. Other prominent performers included Aphex Twin, Camera Obscura, Cat Power, J Mascis and The Moldy Peaches, whose set was their only concert in Spain for the next 21 years. Lift to Experience cancelled their appearance because a member's wife suddenly died. From 11 a.m. to 6 p.m., an hour before the first sets started, the Primavera Sound Film Festival was also held. ...And You Will Know Us by the Trail of Dead headlined a launch party on the eve of the festival, held at Sala Apolo for €9.

In 2003, the festival was officially named Estrella Damm Primavera Sound in partnership with the Barcelona-based beer brand Estrella Damm. The headliners were Belle and Sebastian on 23 May and Sonic Youth on 24 May. There were now five stages, while the film festival and record label fair took place at the Mercat de les Flors. Bands such as Arab Strap, Yo La Tengo, Teenage Fanclub, Television, Mogwai and The White Stripes played on the main Nitsa-Apolo stage. The Go-Betweens, Julian Cope, LCD Soundsystem, The Kills and Wire were also on the lineup. At the time, LCD Soundsystem only had two singles released. On the eve of the festival, there was a presentation party led by Godspeed You! Black Emperor at the Poble Espanyol and The Streets in Sala Apolo.

The 2004 festival was the first to take place over three days. It was headlined by the reunited Pixies (their first European show in 12 years), PJ Harvey, Primal Scream and Wilco (making their European debut). The main Nitsa-Apolo stage was also played by Franz Ferdinand, Mudhoney, Liars and Elbow. Elsewhere, artists like The Divine Comedy, Dizzee Rascal, Lloyd Cole, Smog, Sun Kil Moon, Scissor Sisters and Michael Gira were seen.

=== 2005–2009: Expansion to Parc del Fòrum ===
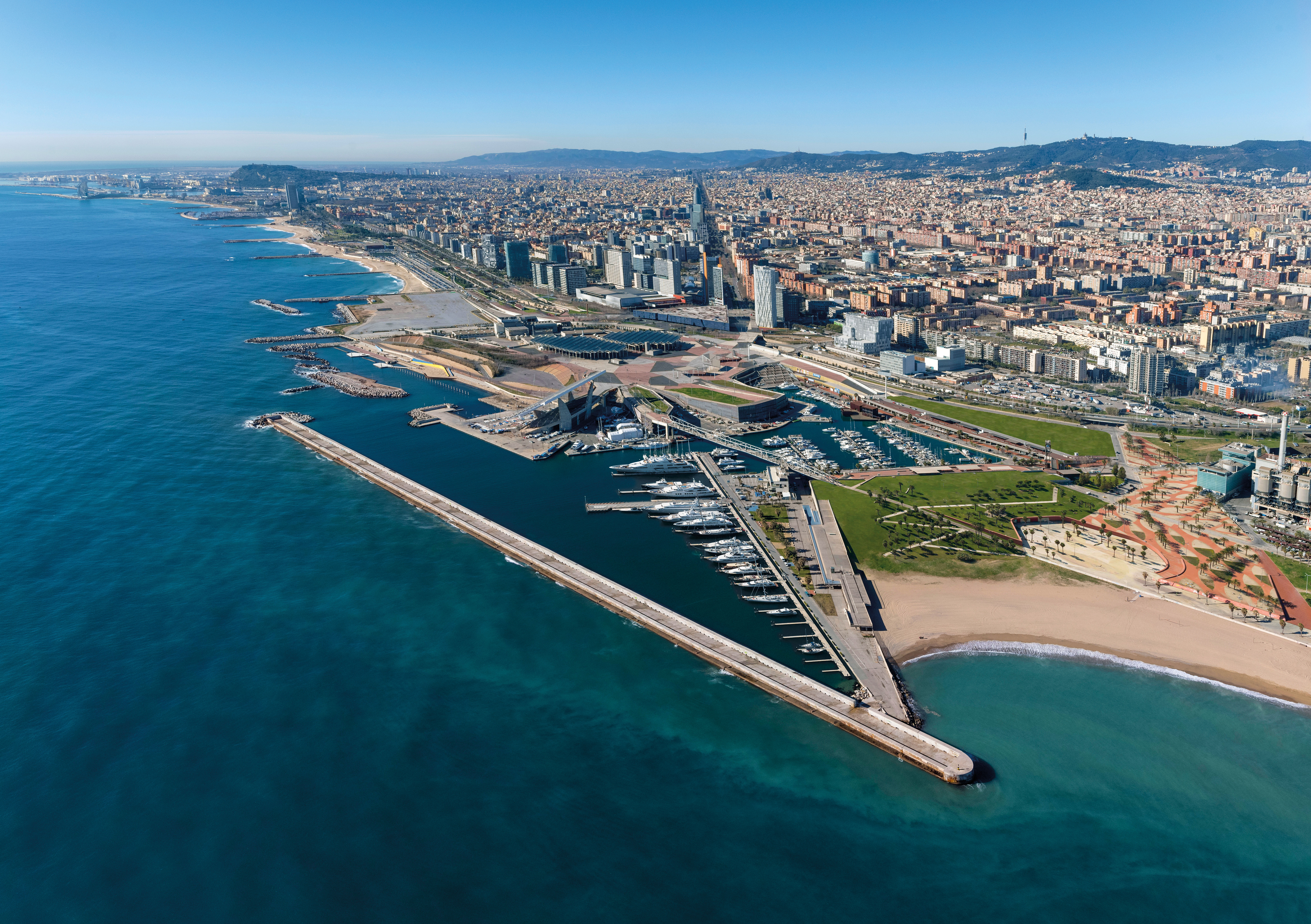
Parc del Fòrum, where the festival takes place since 2005.

In 2005, the festival relocated from the Poble Espanyol to the Parc del Fòrum by the Mediterranean Sea, a site seven times larger. Headliners included New Order, Iggy Pop’s Stooges live comeback, Sonic Youth and Steve Earle, with Gang of Four, Mercury Rev, The Human League, Arcade Fire and Tortoise directly underneath. The Auditori debuted this year, where artists such as Antony & The Johnsons, Vic Chesnutt and Tortoise held indoor performances. The new venue allowed the festival to increase from four to seven stages, and co-director Albert Guijarro said that the Fòrum was the "ideal place to be able to grow in the future".

2006's headliners included Motörhead and Yo La Tengo on Thursday, The Flaming Lips, Dinosaur Jr. and Yeah Yeah Yeahs on Friday, and Lou Reed, Violent Femmes and Stereolab on Saturday. Other performers included Animal Collective, Babyshambles, Big Star, Deerhoof, Drive-By Truckers, Killing Joke, Richard Hawley, Sleater-Kinney and The Drones. Shellac performed for the first time; they have performed every year since, aside from 2007. That year, The New York Times dubbed it "the little festival that could", praising the Parc del Fòrum for its "picturesque setting... before an azure Mediterranean backdrop."

The 2007 event was headlined by the reunited The Smashing Pumpkins, The White Stripes, Wilco, Sonic Youth performing Daydream Nation in full for the first time, Patti Smith and Slint performing Spiderland in full. Other prominent acts included The Fall, The Good, the Bad & the Queen, Maxïmo Park, Los Planetas, Spiritualized, Modest Mouse, Buzzcocks, The Durutti Column, Jonathan Richman, Built to Spill, Billy Bragg, Melvins performing Houdini, Low, Blonde Redhead and Isis. It was the first year that DJ Coco (booker Abel Suárez) performed his festival-closing set of pop hits, which became a yearly tradition, ending with Journey's "Don't Stop Believin'". Director Gabi Ruiz said that the Pumpkins would never play the festival again because they "acted like such divas".

The 2008 edition was headlined by Portishead, Public Enemy performing It Takes a Nation of Millions to Hold Us Back, Rufus Wainwright and Cat Power. Other performers included Tindersticks, The Sonics, Sebadoh, De La Soul, Young Marble Giants, Mission of Burma, Throbbing Gristle, Model 500, Nick Lowe, Vampire Weekend, MGMT and Bon Iver. It marked the first time that artists performed in club venues across Barcelona in the days leading up to the festival, beginning a tradition which would become known as Primavera a la Ciutat. Portishead played two sets, one at the outdoor Rockdelux Stage, where Chuck D joined for "Machine Gun", and one at the indoor Auditori the following day. By this year, 45% of festivalgoers came from other countries.

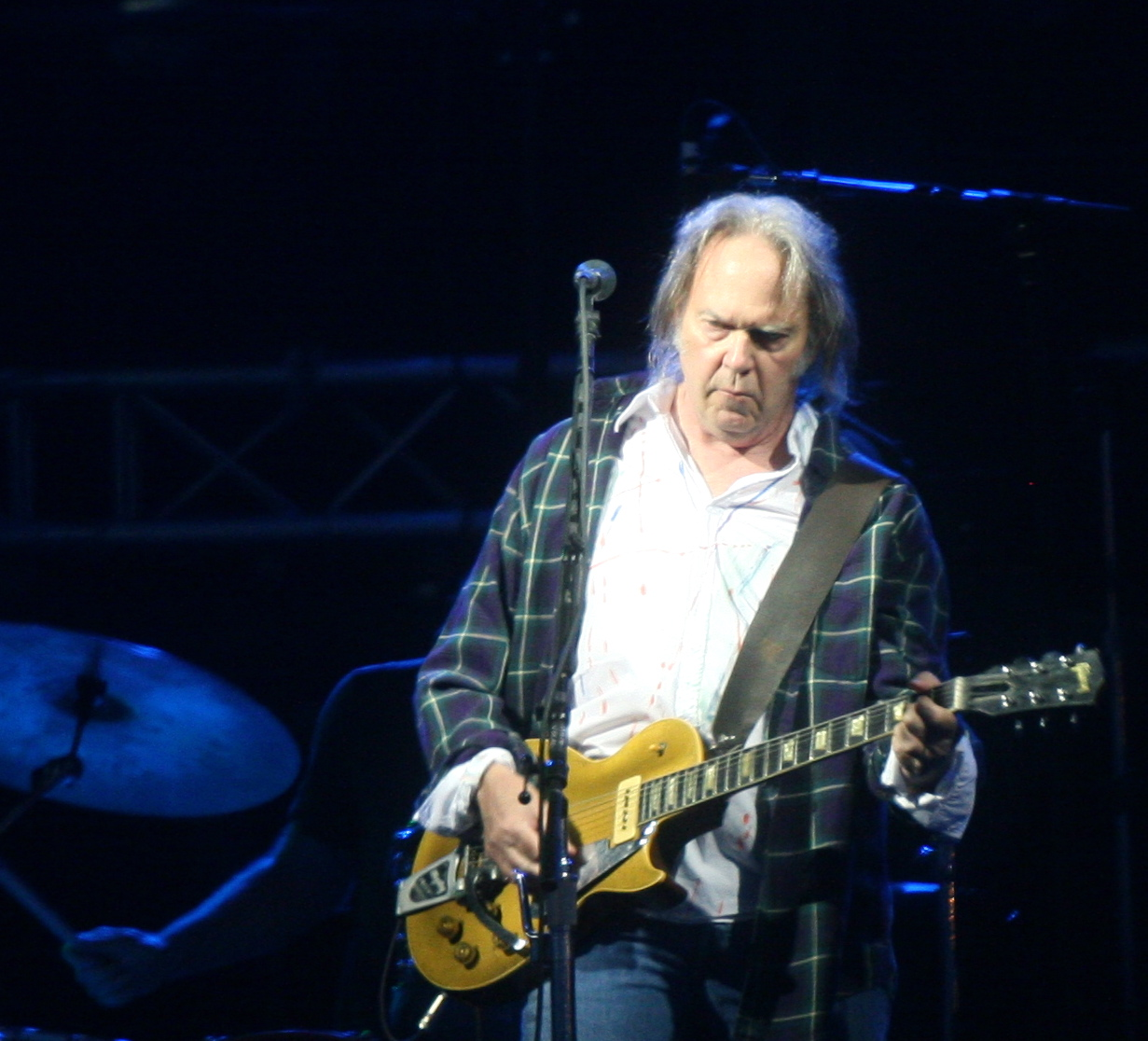
Neil Young at Primavera Sound 2009

Amidst the financial crisis in Spain, the 2009 event continued to break attendance records, aided by the cancellation of the competing Summercase festival. It was headlined by Neil Young, My Bloody Valentine and Sonic Youth. Aphex Twin, Bloc Party, Jarvis Cocker, Yo La Tengo, The Jayhawks, Spiritualized, Throwing Muses, Saint Etienne and The Jesus Lizard were also given prominent billing. It was Young's first Barcelona concert in 22 years, and he became the festival's most expensive headliner booked to date, ending a four-year pursuit to secure him. My Bloody Valentine also performed one outdoor and one indoor set. Performances in city venues began on the Monday of festival week, while more sets at the Parque Joan Miró extended the music to Sunday. The band Wavves had an infamous meltdown on the Pitchfork stage.

Clash commented that Primavera Sound was the "younger brother" of Sónar, Barcelona's longer-running music festival, drawing praise for its "holier than thou indieness" despite the latter's international reputation. Festival booker Abel Suárez noted six years later that booking Young "was a turning point in terms of growth" because Primavera Sound "started to be known as one of the most important festivals in Europe from that point on."

=== 2010–2018: International recognition ===
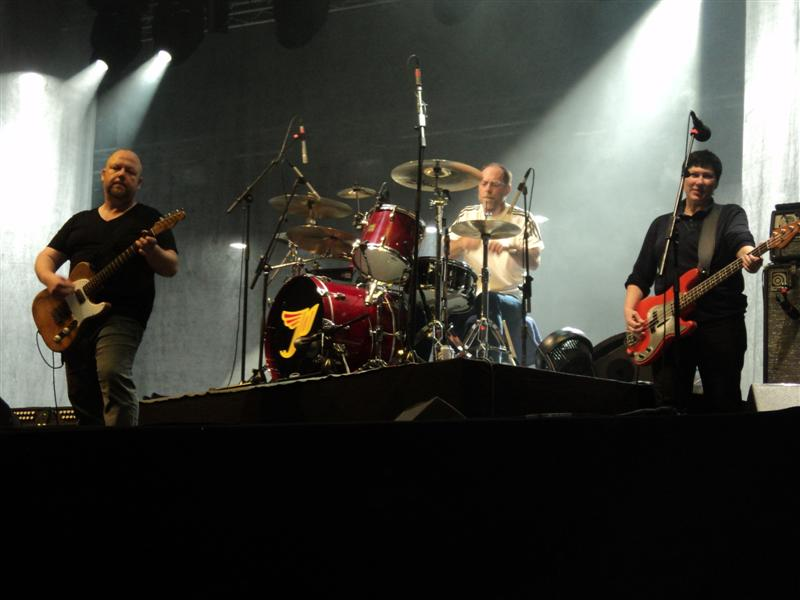
Pixies at Primavera Sound 2010

The festival officially took the name San Miguel Primavera Sound beginning in 2010, after San Miguel Beer. Attendance was over 100,000 for the first time, and it saw the first edition of Primavera Pro, featuring networking talks from professionals involved with the music industry. The headliners were Pixies, Pavement (in their first tour since 1999), Pet Shop Boys, Wilco and Orbital. They were joined by The Charlatans performing Some Friendly, The Fall, Sunny Day Real Estate, Superchunk, Grizzly Bear, Panda Bear, The xx, Broken Social Scene, Tortoise, Wire, Built to Spill, Gary Numan, Marc Almond, Health, Van Dyke Parks, Florence and the Machine, The New Pornographers, Fuck Buttons, No Age and Atlas Sound among other bands. The festival announced that over 35,000 watched Pixies perform at the San Miguel stage, the largest crowd for a single performance so far in Primavera history. Between Pet Shop Boys, Orbital and Marc Almond, Primavera notably secured three names who had previously headlined Sónar.

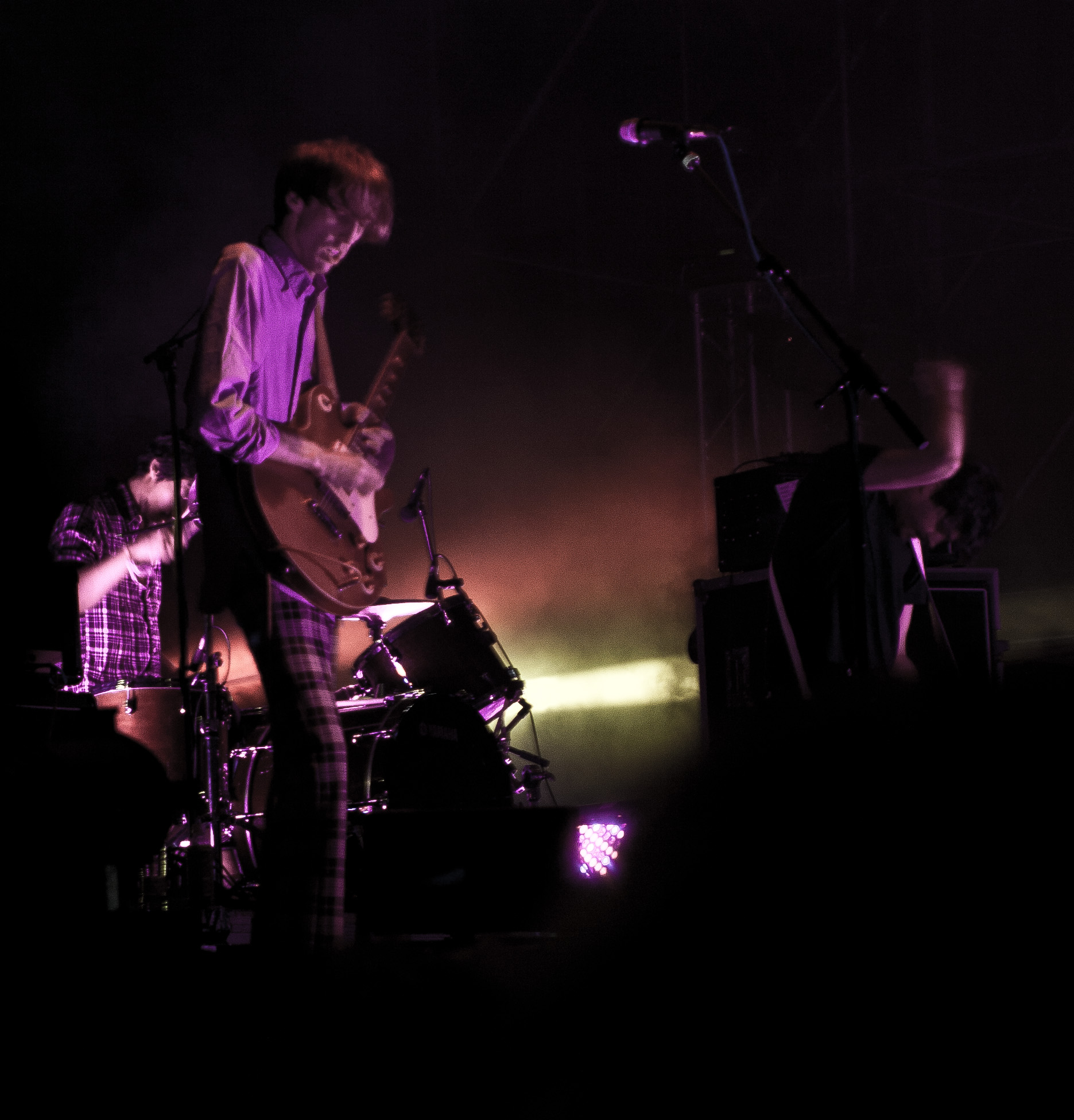
Deerhunter at Primavera Sound 2011

In 2011, attendance grew to over 120,000 people. Headliners were The Flaming Lips and Grinderman on Thursday, Pulp and Belle & Sebastian on Friday, and Animal Collective and PJ Harvey on Saturday. Other prominent names were Interpol, The National, Fleet Foxes, Sufjan Stevens, Mogwai, John Cale performing Paris 1919, Mercury Rev performing Deserter's Songs, M. Ward and Low. International brands such as Ray-Ban and Adidas began partnering with the festival. The festival overlapped with the 27 May protest at the Plaça de Catalunya, where 99 protestors were hospitalised by armed police, inspiring Pulp frontman Jarvis Cocker to dedicate "Common People" to the protestors with a speech in Catalan during their first announced set since 2002. On Saturday night, large crowds gathered at the video screens set up by the Llevant stage to watch FC Barcelona defeat Manchester United in the 2011 Champions League final.

The 2012 edition of the festival was headlined by Franz Ferdinand and Wilco on Thursday, The Cure on Friday and Justice on Saturday. Björk was supposed to headline Saturday but cancelled three weeks prior because of an inflamed vocal cord nodule. Notably, The Weeknd performed his first career European set and Refused, who broke up in 1998, played as part of their Reunion Tour. The xx, Death Cab for Cutie and Rufus Wainwright were also given prominent billing. Melvins, Sleep and El-P also dropped out. The Cure's headlining set lasted three hours, with 36 songs and three encores, including the first performance of "Fight" since 1987. It remains the longest single set in Primavera's history. The closing night was held at the Arc de Triomf and headlined by Richard Hawley. That year, the first edition of Primavera Sound took place at the Parque da Cidade in Porto, Portugal, sponsored by Optimus.

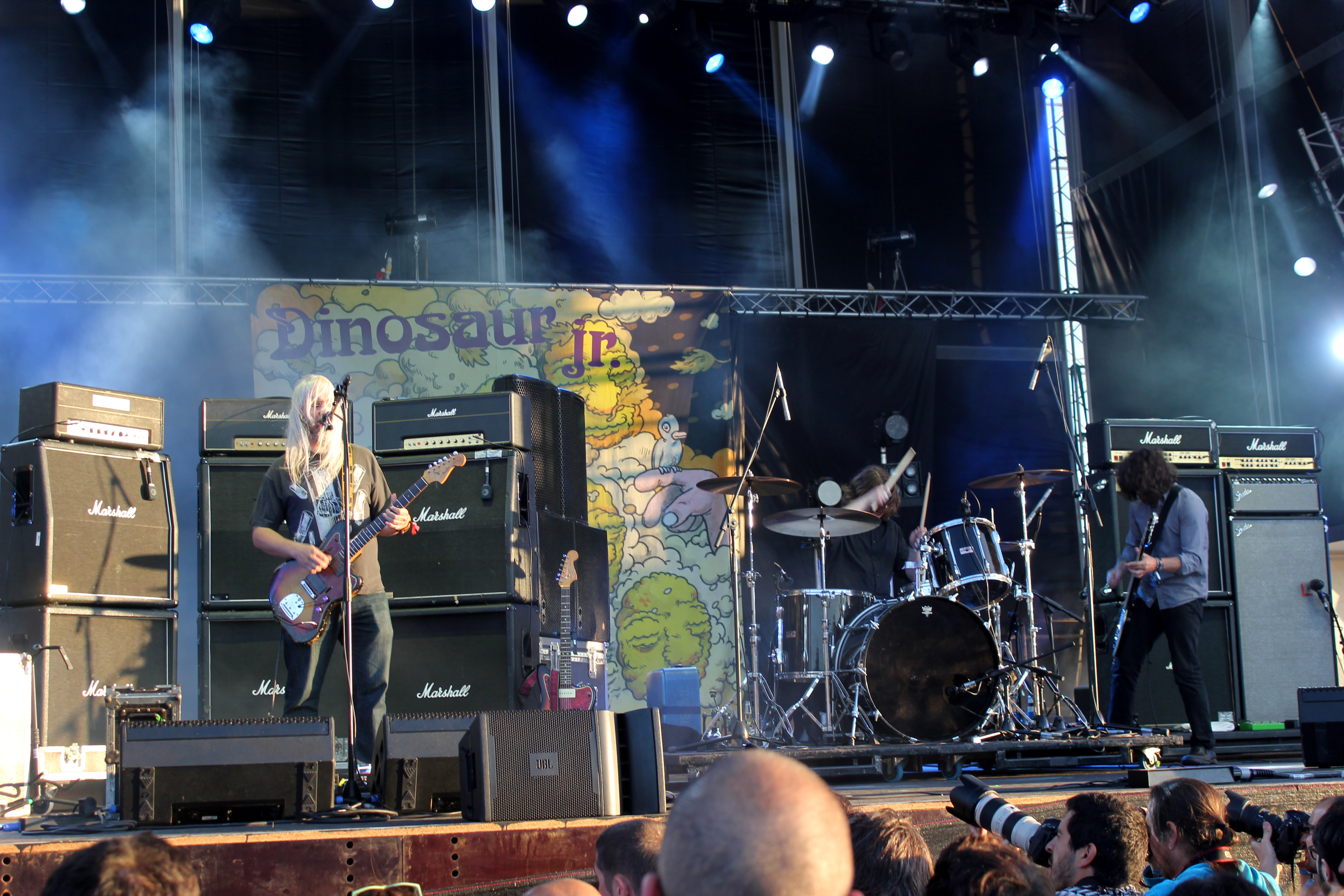
Dinosaur Jr. at Primavera Sound 2013

2013's headliners were The Postal Service, Phoenix, Blur, The Jesus and Mary Chain, Nick Cave and the Bad Seeds and My Bloody Valentine. The lineup also featured Animal Collective, Grizzly Bear, Tame Impala, The Knife, James Blake, Band of Horses, Wu-Tang Clan and Los Planetas, among 260 acts. The festival was also set to host Fiona Apple's only scheduled performance of the year, but she canceled in April. Heineken replaced San Miguel as the festival's beer partner, and the festival dropped partnerships from its official name.

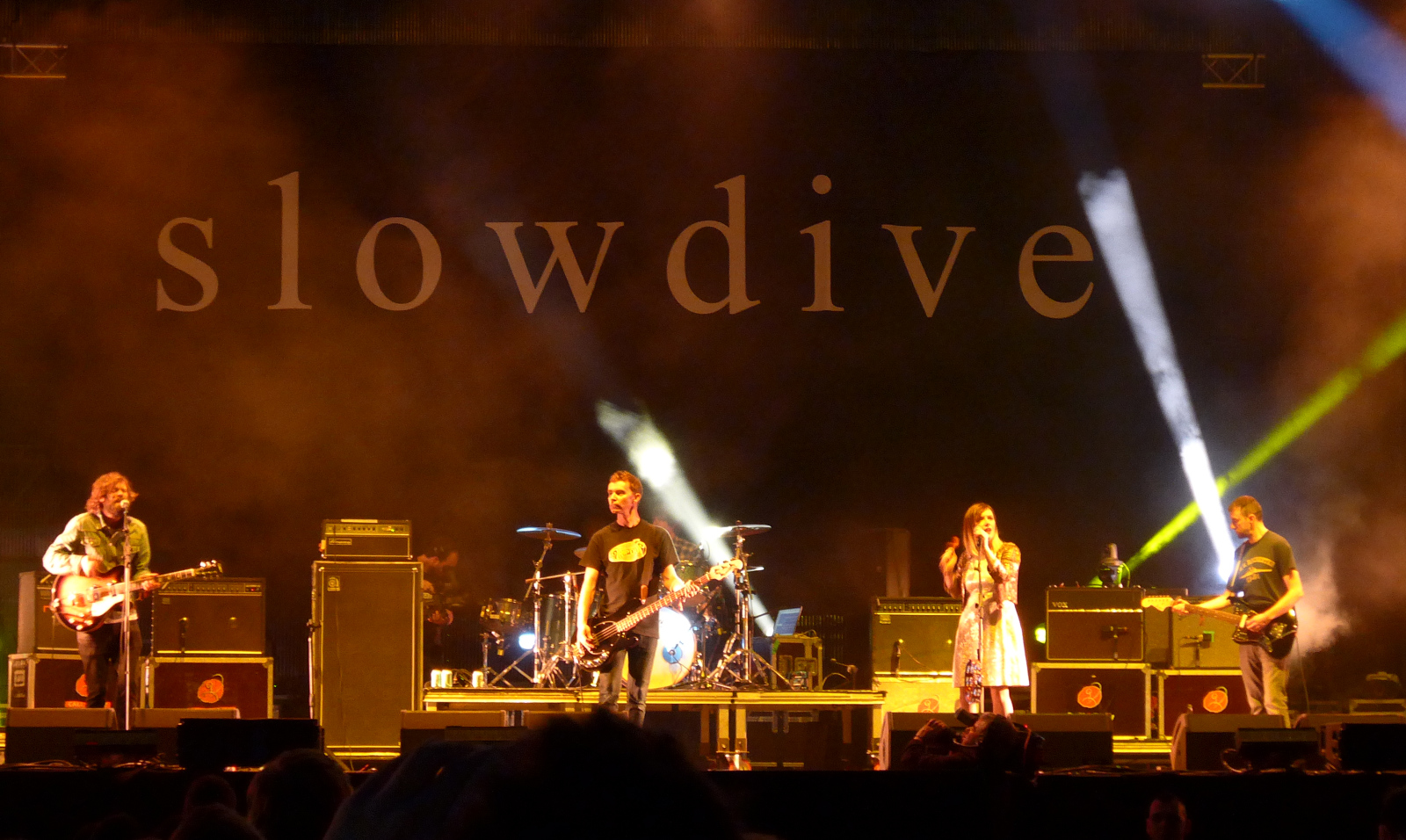
The newly reunited Slowdive at Primavera Sound 2014

The lineup for the 2014 edition was announced via a 26-minute short film. The headliners were Arcade Fire, Queens of the Stone Age, The National, Pixies, Slowdive, Nine Inch Nails and Kendrick Lamar. Slowdive announced their reunion after 19 years of disbandment to play the festival. The main stages were also played by Real Estate, Disclosure, Midlake, Warpaint, X, Haim, !!!, Spoon, Television (performing Marquee Moon in full), Volcano Choir and Foals. The Heineken Hidden Stage debuted this year, offering intimate concerts on a smaller stage which required ticket reservations to enter.

In 2015, the festival was headlined by The Black Keys, Antony and the Johnsons, Alt-J, Patti Smith performing Horses, The Strokes, Ride, Interpol and Underworld performing Dubnobasswithmyheadman. Other performers on the main stages included James Blake, Julian Casablancas & The Voidz, Damien Rice, the reunited Sleater-Kinney, Mac DeMarco and Foxygen. Orchestral Manoeuvres in the Dark headlined a free Wednesday show. This year featured many reunions as Ride last performed in 1996, The Replacements disbanded in 1991 and Sleater-Kinney toured for the first time since 2006.

The 2016 festival was headlined by Radiohead, LCD Soundsystem (who had recently reunited), PJ Harvey and Sigur Rós. Tame Impala, Explosions in the Sky, Air, Beach House, The Last Shadow Puppets, Beirut, Moderat, Deerhunter, Wild Nothing and Brian Wilson's Pet Sounds also played on the main stages. Suede headlined the year's free lead-up Wednesday show. It saw the reunion of The Avalanches, who had not performed live since 2007 or DJ'd since 2011. A new beach stage opened across a bridge at the Sant Adrià de Besòs port focusing on electronic music sets from artists including Sophie and Todd Terje. The festival sold out earlier than ever, with Radiohead's first festival show in half a decade. Radiohead ended their set with an unplanned second encore of "Creep", the second time that the song was performed since 2009. Consequence of Sound named it the festival of the year.

The 2017 headliners were originally Bon Iver, Aphex Twin, Frank Ocean, The xx, Arcade Fire and Van Morrison. However, Ocean canceled his headlining gig four days before his performance due to "production delays beyond his control", replaced by a Jamie xx DJ set. Arcade Fire, Mogwai and Haim performed secret sets, while Slayer, Miguel, Grace Jones, Run the Jewels and Solange also played on the main stage. On 31 May, Arcade Fire released their new single "Everything Now" exclusively on a 12" vinyl single at the festival's merch table. The song was uploaded to streaming with a music video the next day, where the band debuted it live during their secret set. More than 200,000 people attended as the festival's budget grew to over €12 million. Stereogum acclaimed it as "the best festival in Europe".

In 2018, the headliners were Björk, Nick Cave and the Bad Seeds, The National, Arctic Monkeys, Lorde and A$AP Rocky. Planned headliner Migos missed their flight to Barcelona and cancelled hours before their set. Skepta was named as their replacement but airport delays prevented him from landing in Barcelona in time, so Los Planetas filled in the timeslot on short notice. Artists from 33 countries were booked for the event. Chvrches, The War on Drugs, Alex G, Father John Misty, Tyler, the Creator, Lykke Li and Car Seat Headrest were among the names that also played the main stages. The area for the electronic music beach stages were renamed "Primavera Bits" and advertised as a "festival within a festival", featuring sets from artists such as Four Tet, Floating Points, Oneohtrix Point Never, Jon Hopkins, Panda Bear and Madlib. Multiple bands paid tribute to the recently deceased Scott Hutchison of Frightened Rabbit. The festival emphasised a new initiative against sexual harassment with the slogan "no callem" (English: "we won’t keep quiet"), as a response to the MeToo movement and reports of widespread sexual harassment at Coachella.

On 21 June 2018, the American private equity firm Yucaipa Companies, led by billionaire Ronald Burkle, purchased a minority stake in Primavera Sound. The festival stressed that it remained an independent organisation.

=== 2019–2023: "The New Normal" and double weekend model ===
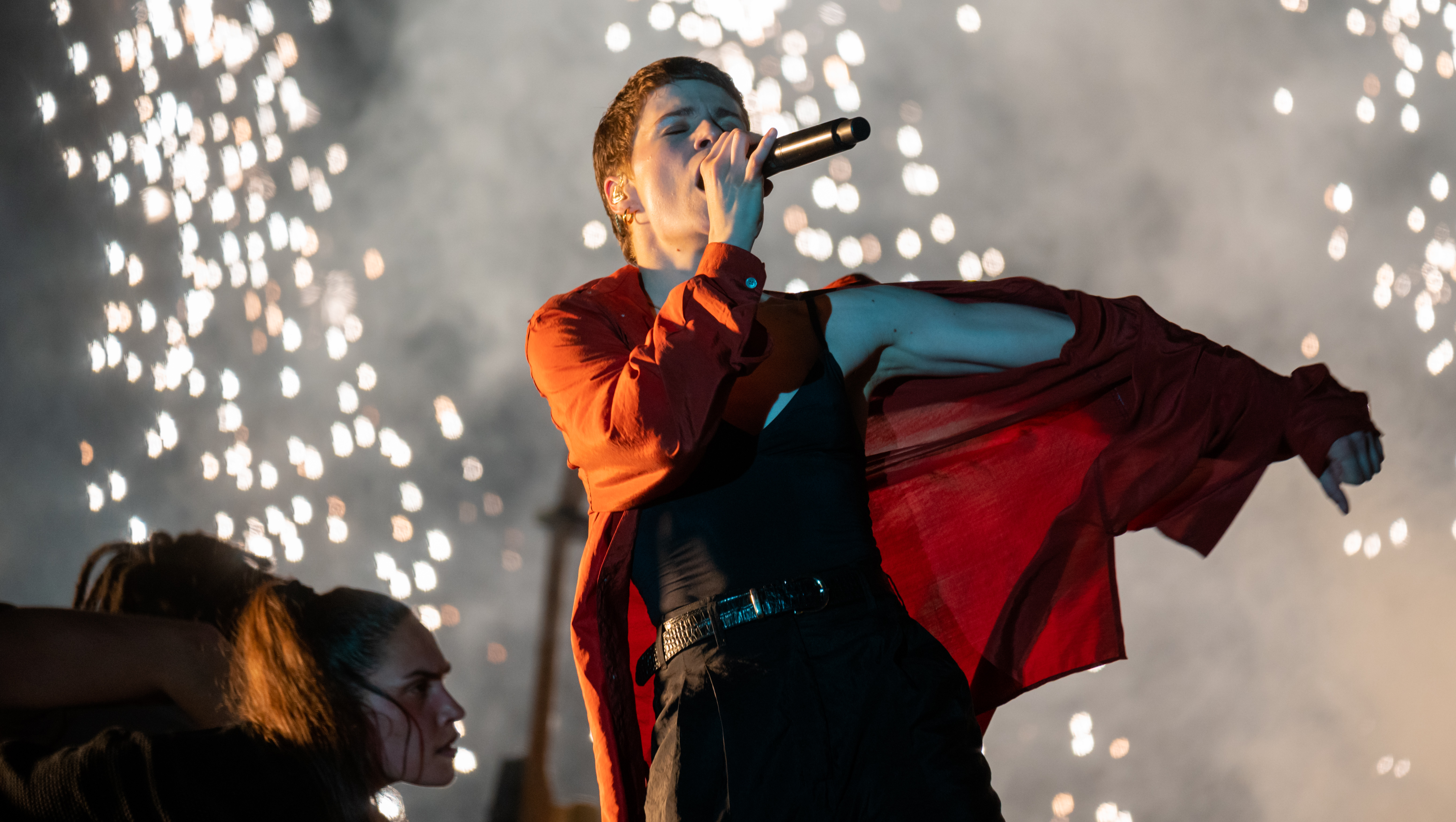
Christine and the Queens performing in 2019

With the 2019 lineup, the festival's organisers committed to begin a gender-balanced lineup which Primavera advertised as "The New Normal." Female-fronted acts made up over half of the total performers, up from 35% in 2018. The largely female headliners were Erykah Badu, Future, Interpol, Tame Impala, Cardi B, Janelle Monáe, Solange, J Balvin and Rosalía. Cardi B cancelled her appearance due to scheduling conflicts and was replaced by Miley Cyrus, who fully premiered her brand new EP She Is Coming. The festival noted how it featured a "variety of genres that goes from extreme metal to reggaeton." Big Thief, Courtney Barnett, Carly Rae Jepsen, Robyn and Kali Uchis also played the main stages, this year sponsored by SEAT and Pull&Bear. It was attended by over 220,000 people. The festival also launched the "Nobody is Normal" initiative against homophobia and gender violence. Later that year, Primavera Sound announced it would switch to exclusively mobile tickets for 2020, the first major festival in the world to do so, in order to combat scalping and environmental waste. In November 2019, a smaller edition of the festival named Primavera Weekender began at Magic Robin Hood Camp in Benidorm, attended by over 3,500 people. It occurred until 2024.

The 2020 edition originally featured Massive Attack, Pavement (in their first performance since their 2010 hiatus), The National, The Strokes, Lana del Rey, Tyler, the Creator, Bad Bunny and Disclosure as headliners. In March 2020, the festival was moved to August 2020 because of the COVID-19 pandemic, and ultimately cancelled in May. Later that month, the 2021 lineup was announced, featuring similar lineups to the cancelled 2020 edition. However, in March 2021, the festival was cancelled again.

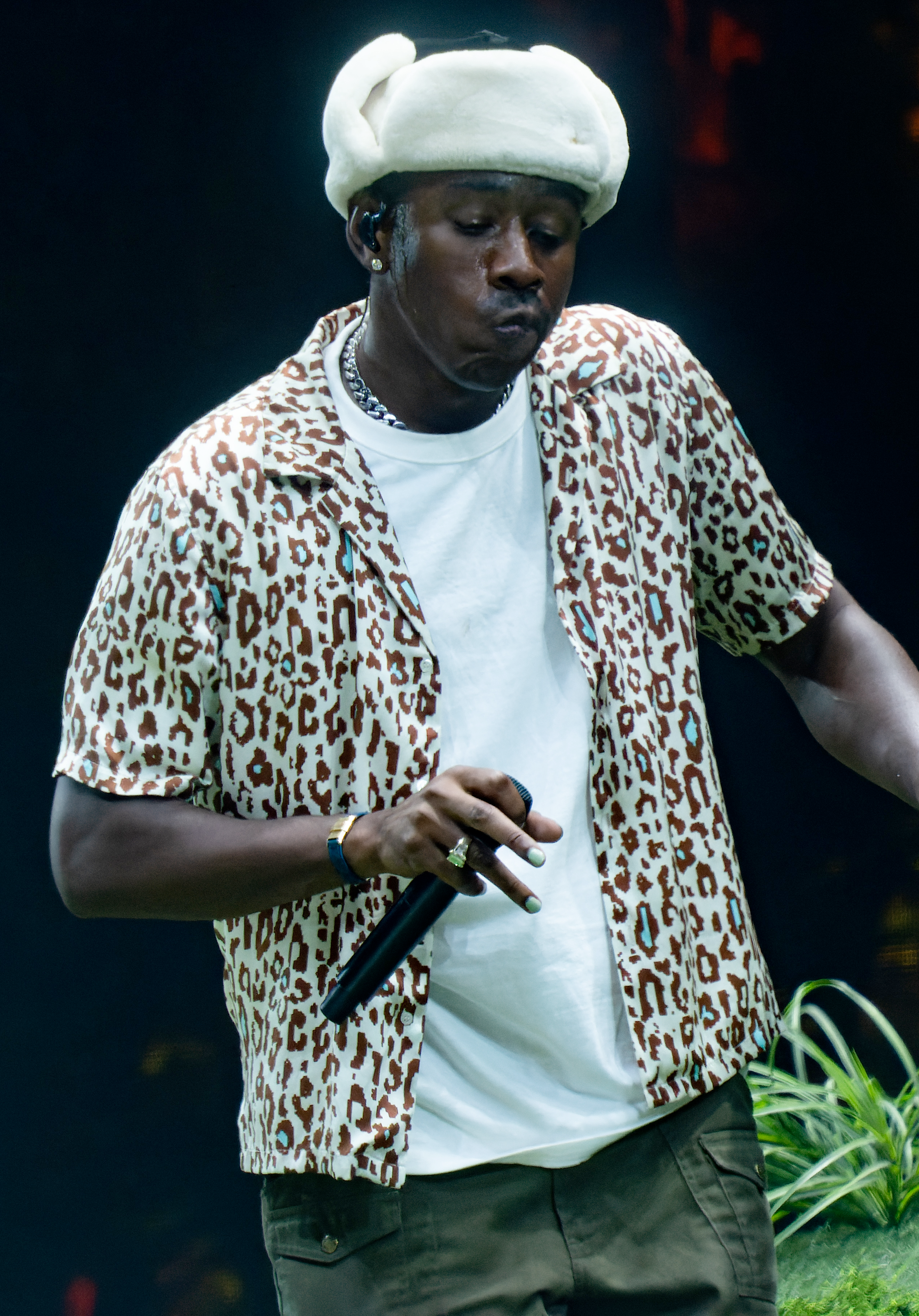
Tyler, the Creator at Primavera Sound 2022

Primavera Sound returned in 2022 from 1 June to 12 June, featuring a two-weekend model for the first time with a lineup that combined most bookings from the cancelled 2020 and 2021 editions with new names. The first weekend was headlined by Pavement, Tame Impala, Beck, The National, Gorillaz, Jorja Smith, Nick Cave & the Bad Seeds and Tyler, the Creator, while the second weekend was headlined by Dua Lipa, Gorillaz, Interpol, Tyler, the Creator, Lorde, The Strokes, Jorja Smith, Megan Thee Stallion, Tame Impala, Phoenix and Yeah Yeah Yeahs. Scheduled headliner Massive Attack cancelled three months prior to their performance due to a member's health complications. Dreamcatcher became the first K-pop artist to play in the festival's history. King Gizzard & the Lizard Wizard performed five sets without repeating a single song in a setlist. There were a total of 674 shows at the festival.

As the 20th anniversary of the festival, it was considered an Event of Exceptional Public Interest by the Government's Ministry of Culture and Sports, the first international music festival in Spain to earn the distinction. It was attended by 460,500 people, including 65% foreigners, and the average attendee spent €1,423 in Barcelona during the festival, generating €349 million ($367 million) to the city.

The 2023 festival reverted to the one-week structure in Barcelona but was the first to feature a nearly identical edition in Madrid's Arganda del Rey neighborhood a week later. Presented under the slogan "I'll be your mirror", the headliners first announced in November 2022 were Blur, Halsey, Kendrick Lamar, Depeche Mode, Rosalía and Calvin Harris, followed by New Order in March. Other prominent performers included Darkside, Ghost, Turnstile, Baby Keem, Four Tet, Fred Again, Skrillex, Caroline Polachek, Måneskin and St. Vincent. Pet Shop Boys headlined the free Wednesday show in Parc del Fòrum for Barcelona and Cívitas Metropolitano in Madrid. On Friday, Skrillex's set was disrupted because the stage caught fire as he performed. There were 253,000 recorded attendees on smaller grounds than usual, as capacity was reduced from 95,000 to 75,000 with the removal of the Bits area. Barcelona experienced a decrease in foreign attendees from 70% to 52%, mainly among British visitors, which was attributed to the impact of Brexit and increased costs.

Before Madrid's planned opening day on 8 June, the festival canceled all performances on Thursday due to weather concerns. Headliner Blur held a free makeup show at the 2,500-capacity La Riviera club. Attendance in Madrid was lower than Barcelona, with 42,000 on Friday and 48,000 on Saturday, despite the festival grounds' capacity of 85,000. On 22 July, Primavera Sound announced that it would not be returning to Madrid in 2024 because "the city does not have a site able to host an event of this magnitude and format in terms of audience demands, production requirements, and musical show." Complaints were raised about the Ciudad del Rock complex's location 40 km away from Madrid's city center, long lines for shuttle buses to and from the venue, and overall poor logistics.

=== 2024–present: Back to basics ===
Upon the release of the 2024 lineup, with headliners Pulp, Vampire Weekend and Justice on Thursday, Lana Del Rey, The National and Disclosure on Friday, and SZA, PJ Harvey, Mitski, FKA Twigs and Charli XCX on Saturday, the festival advertised the edition as showing "love for its own history." On 14 May, the festival announced FKA Twigs' set was postponed until 2025. A stage was renamed for Steve Albini, who died suddenly the week before and was scheduled to play with Shellac for a 16th edition. Phoenix headlined the free Jornada Inaugural opening day at Parc del Fòrum on 29 May. Del Rey showed up nearly half an hour late to her headline performance on 31 May, which received negative reviews from publications including Rolling Stone and NME. A heavy rainstorm began during Harvey's headlining set on 1 June, culminating in lightning as Mitski performed hours later. Charli XCX debuted the songs "Everything is Romantic" and "365" days before the release of her sixth album Brat.

The 2025 lineup was revealed in October 2024, featuring headliners Chappell Roan, Charli XCX and Sabrina Carpenter, which Charli labeled the "holy trinity". The next day, Central Cee was added as an "additional headliner", but ultimately not given headliner status on the poster. In December, Charli announced that Troye Sivan would accompany her for the exclusive European date of their joint Sweat tour. This edition of the traditionally indie rock festival was headlined by three pop stars, and all tickets atypically sold out by January. The Auditori was unavailable in 2025 because of a private event booking. During the festival, a surprise Tame Impala DJ set was announced, where Kevin Parker premiered "End of Summer", the lead single from the Deadbeat album. Attendance for the festival was 293,000, a franchise record for a single-week edition, and the economic impact of the festival generated over €300 million in revenue for Barcelona.

The 2026 lineup was revealed in September 2025, the earliest date in festival history. Thursday's headliners of Doja Cat, Massive Attack ("to settle a historic debt") and Bad Gyal were all cancelled, as well as Alex G and Mac DeMarco's sets on other stages, because of "adverse weather" including heavy rain and winds up to 80 km/h. Friday was headlined by The Cure, Addison Rae and Skrillex. Saturday was headlined by The xx, Gorillaz and My Bloody Valentine. Olivia Rodrigo announced a surprise set on Saturday five hours prior to her show, where she brought out Robert Smith to perform an unreleased collaboration "What's Wrong with Me" from her album You Seem Pretty Sad for a Girl So in Love.

The 2027 lineup, the festival's 25th edition, was revealed in October 2026. It will be headlined by Fontaines D.C. on Thursday, Phoebe Bridgers on Friday and Doechii on Saturday. Underworld will headline the opening night on Wednesday.

== Location and festival grounds ==
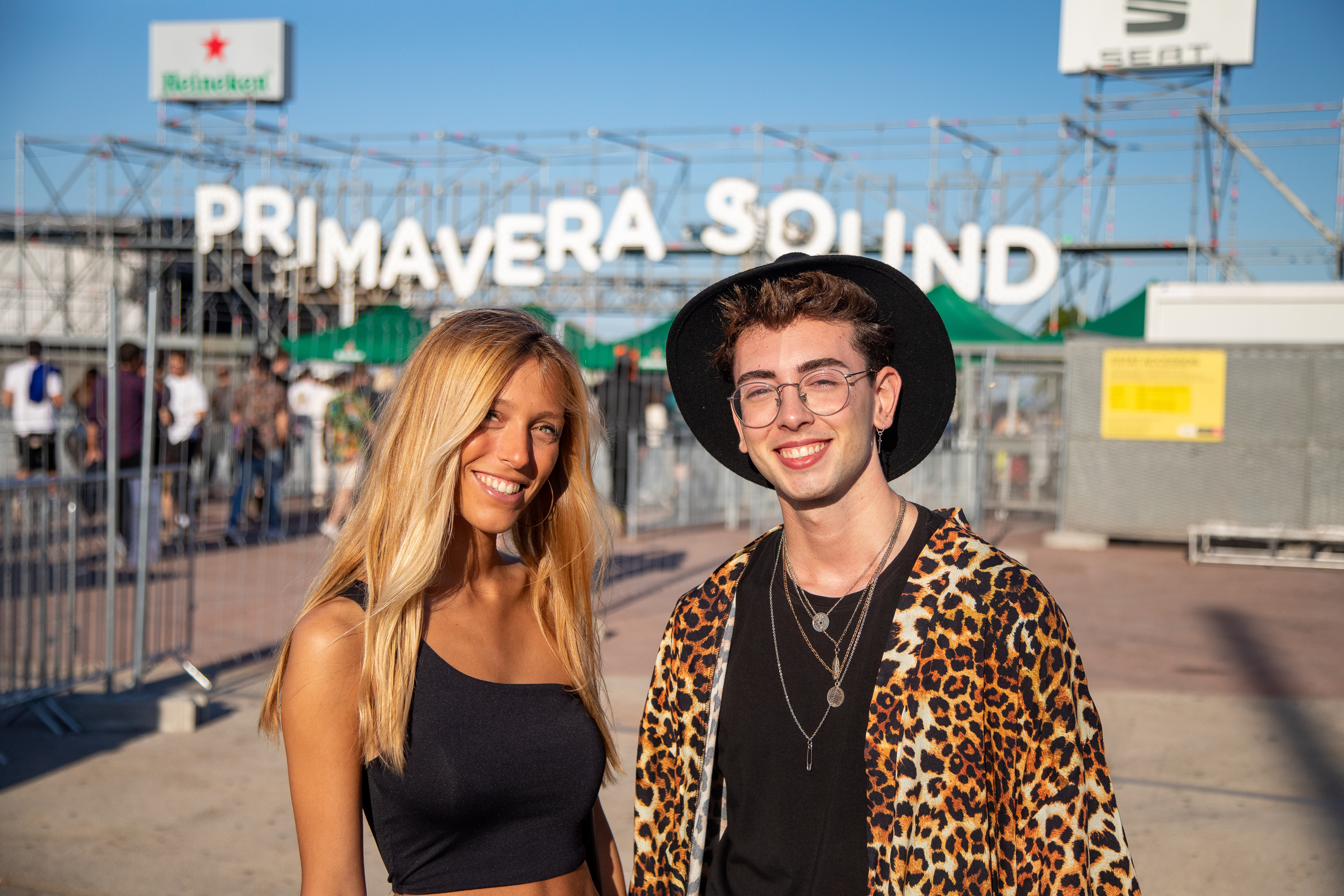
Attendees at the entrance

Primavera Sound takes place in the Parc del Fòrum, located in the southeast part of the Poblenou neighbourhood, between Barcelona and Sant Adrià de Besòs. It is accessible through public transport via the El Maresme – Fòrum metro station and the Trambesòs tram lines. With the addition of the Bits area in Sant Adrià de Besòs from 2016 to 2022, the festival's capacity was 95,000. Following its removal in 2023, the capacity was reduced to 75,000.

The festival's stages are named after its sponsors. The two main stages, where the headliners and other popular acts perform, are located on the Plataforma Marina, a large flat terrain that was scheduled to hold a marine zoo but that remained to be a fairground and multipurpose venue after the project seemed non-viable due to the Spanish financial crisis. This area is colloquially referred to as Mordor due to its demanding environment and distance from the festival entrance. It is the furthest point from the rest of the festival's stages. Two stages were placed in this area beginning in 2013. From 2014 to 2019, the two stages faced each other. Beginning in 2022, the stages were placed adjacent to one another to reduce crowd pressure. Before 2013, the main stage was held at the entrance esplanade as the San Miguel/Estrella Damm stage depending on the sponsor, and the second-largest stage was placed at the Plataforma Marina.

As of 2023, the other primary stages of the festival include an open-air amphitheater currently sponsored by Cupra (formerly Ray-Ban), two outdoor stages near the main entrance of the festival grounds sponsored by Amazon Music and Ron Brugal, a seafront stage with an emphasis on critically acclaimed artists currently sponsored by Plenitude (formerly Pitchfork), and another seafront stage with an emphasis on heavy music sponsored by DICE (formerly Ouigo and Adidas).

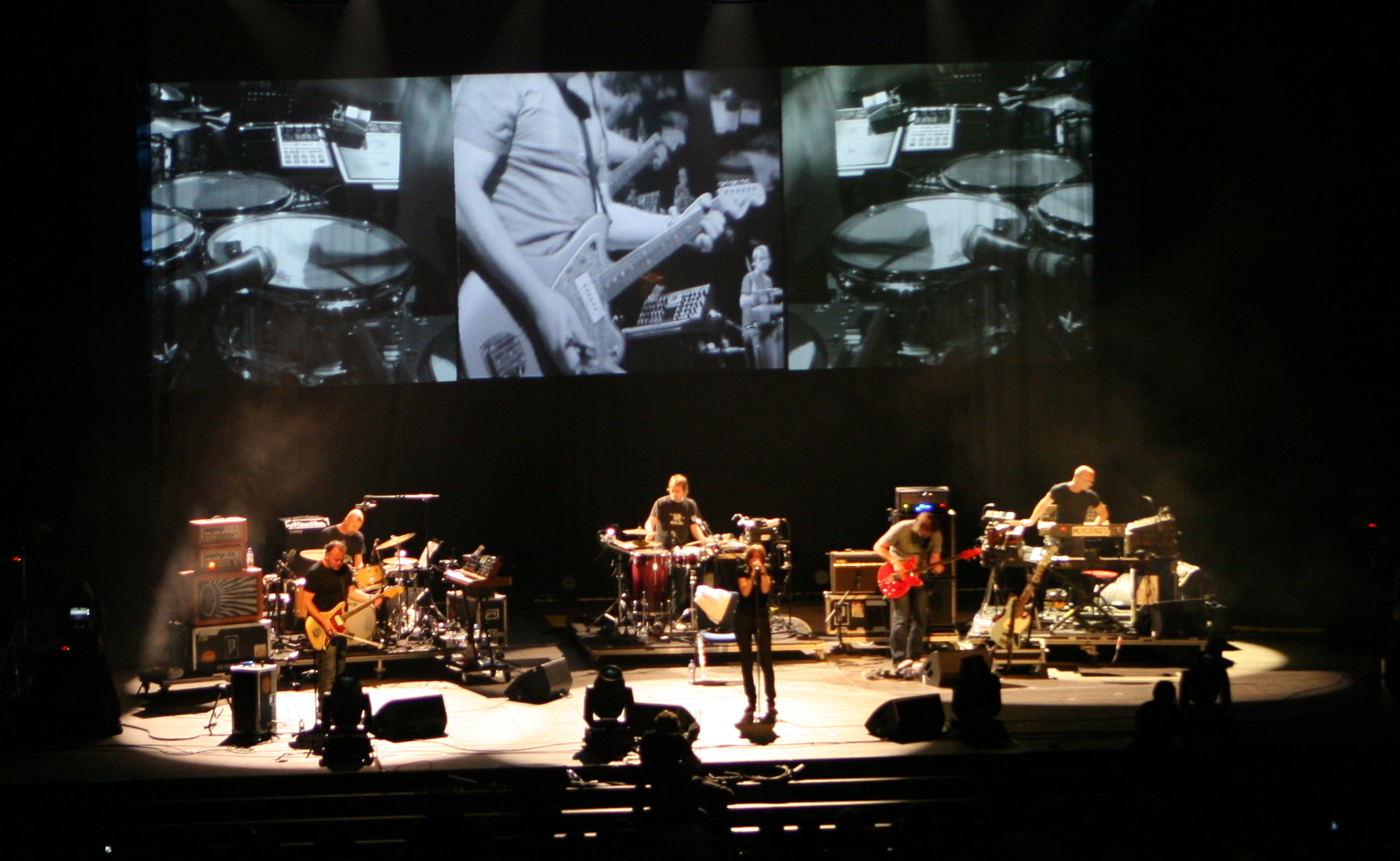
Portishead performing in the Auditori in 2008

The Auditori Rockdelux is an indoor 3,084-capacity auditorium under the triangular-shaped Museum of Natural Sciences of Barcelona building. It is the only seated indoor stage on the festival's grounds. Past editions of the festival required a separate ticket for Auditori shows. There is a strict no food or drink policy for the Auditori, and the most popular shows require queueing outside the building in order to get in. The Auditori is noted for its darkened ambiance and emphasis on acoustics.

Stages which focus on electronic music include The Warehouse, which is sponsored by Stone Island (formerly NTS) located in an underground car park, the Boiler Room x Cupra, and the Pull&Bear stage (formerly sponsored by DICE and a part of Primavera Bits). From 2016 to 2022, Primavera Bits was home to up to three stages located on a beach in the nearby Sant Adrià de Besòs municipality, which was accessible via a bridge and a waterfront path. In 2023, the area was removed from festival grounds because the festival was barred from using the bridge that connected the main grounds to the beach.

The ATP stage was run by London-based festival organisers All Tomorrow's Parties and featured artist lineups that were personally curated by the organisation. After All Tomorrow's Parties went out of business in 2016, the stage was renamed the Primavera stage in 2017. In 2022, this stage was renamed after cryptocurrency exchange Binance. However, the entrance esplanade which housed this stage was remodeled in 2023 to feature two adjacent stages.

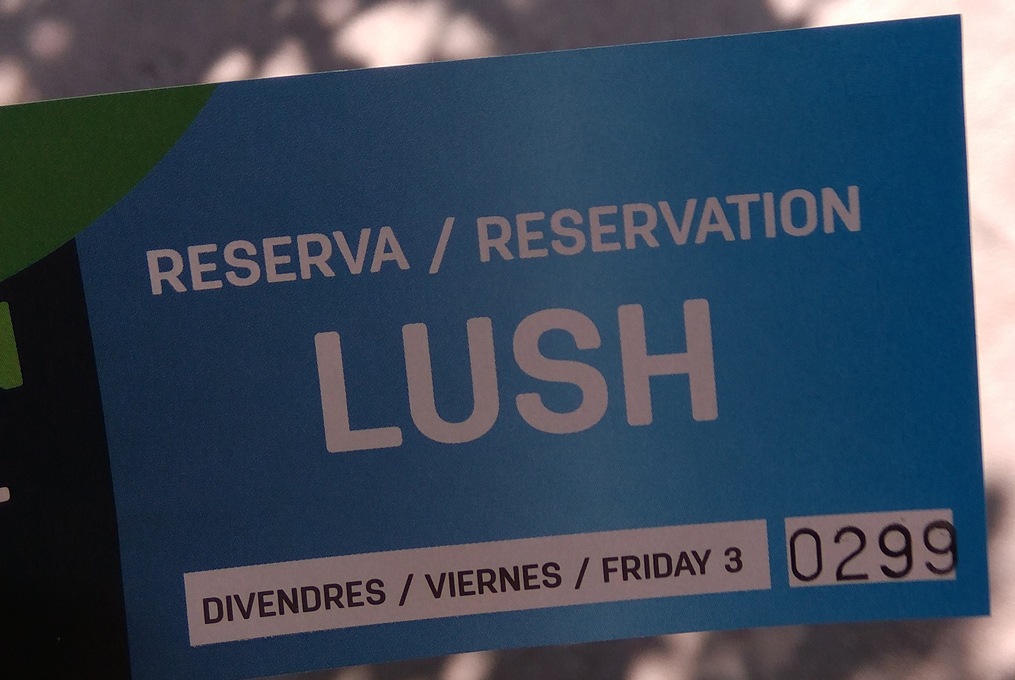
Reservation ticket for Lush in 2016

From 2014 to 2019, the festival was home to the Heineken Hidden Stage, which allowed for artists to be seen in a more intimate environment. The first band to play it was Girl Band in 2014. In order to gain access to the stage, festivalgoers had to request a maximum of two tickets per each performer at the festival's information desk beginning at 4 p.m. of the respective day. In 2017, Pulp's Jarvis Cocker and Steve Mackey performed their Dancefloor Meditations project on the Wednesday before the main festival. In 2018, the stage was moved from the underground car park to an outdoor location where Arcade Fire had played a secret set the year prior, allowing for the abandonment of the ticket system. The stage was renamed to the Your Heineken Stage in 2019. The concept was revisited in 2023 with "The Vision by Pull&Bear" stage, where artists including Japanese Breakfast, Tomberlin and Del Water Gap played on a floating stage in the Mediterranean Sea.

In 2013, the festival featured a Ferris wheel overlooking the ATP stage, which Pitchfork criticised as "now-cliched".

=== Primavera a la Ciutat ===
Beginning in 2008, Primavera Sound hosts shows held at local Barcelona venues in the days surrounding the festival in a tradition known as Primavera a la Ciutat (English: Primavera in the City). Access to the Ciutat shows is included with the purchase of a festival ticket, but 15% of the capacity is open to the general public.

The first Primavera a la Ciutat show on 26 May 2008 was headlined at La [2] de Apolo by Scarlet's Well, the project of The Monochrome Set lead singer Bid. That year also featured Ciutat sets from Matt Elliott, The Clientele and The Radio Dept. It was promoted as "Primavera als Clubs". The practice continued in 2009 with sets from David Gedge of The Wedding Present and Dälek. During these years, the Parque Joan Miró was also used as a venue. In 2012, Primavera a la Ciutat performances also took place at the Arc de Triomf. Prior to their headlining performance in 2016, LCD Soundsystem played a free secret show at BARTS, a club with a capacity of 900 people. The 2022 edition featured 14 separate venues across Barcelona used for Primavera a la Ciutat. With 460,500 tickets sold that year and entry into each venue on a first-come, first-serve basis, festivalgoers reported queueing over three hours ahead of time to ensure access to gigs such as a Megan Thee Stallion performance in a 2,000-capacity club.

The venues currently in use for Primavera a la Ciutat are Razzmatazz, Sala Apolo, La (2) de Apolo, Paral-lel 62 (formerly known as BARTS), La Nau and LAUT.

== Stage gallery ==
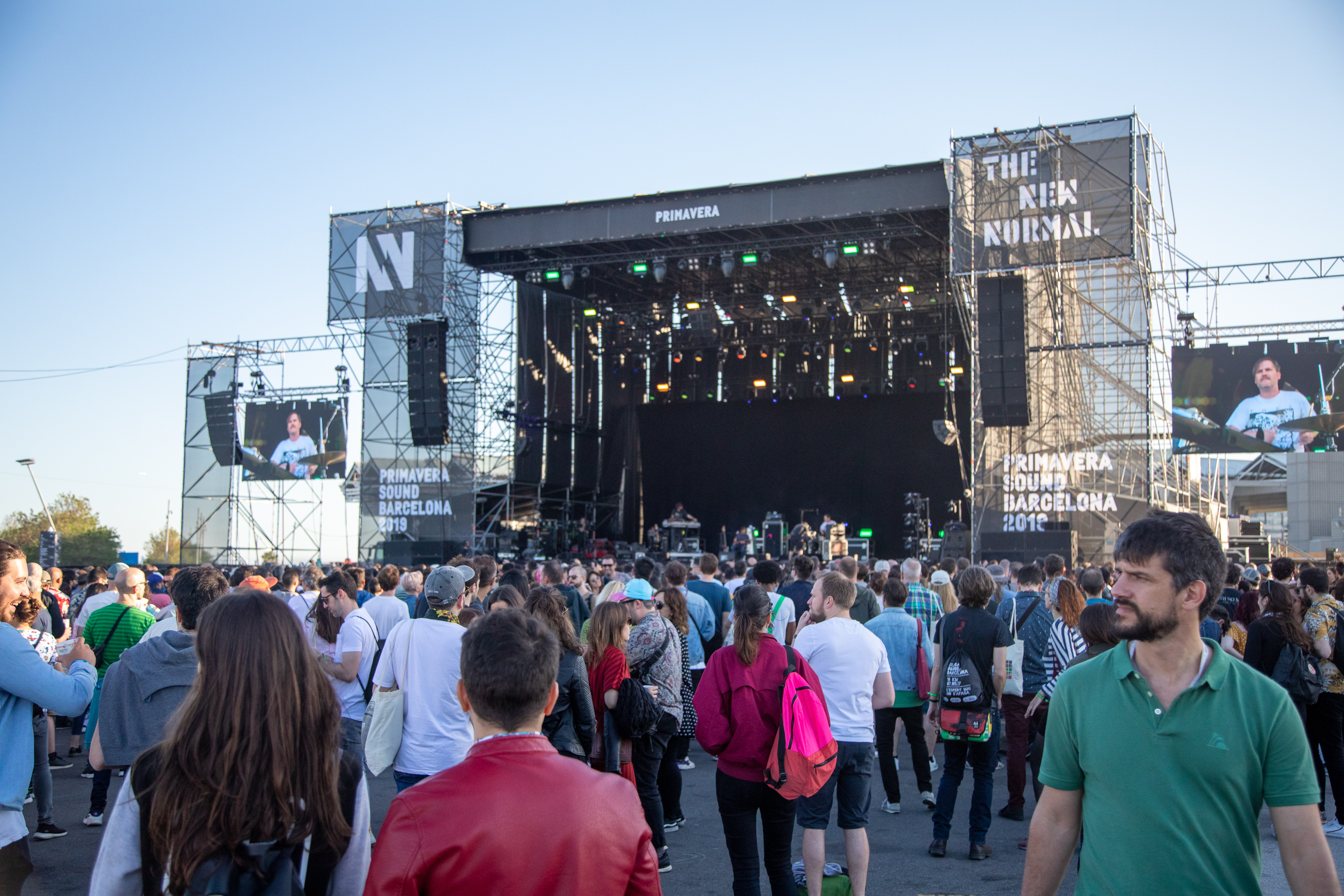
Main Stage by day

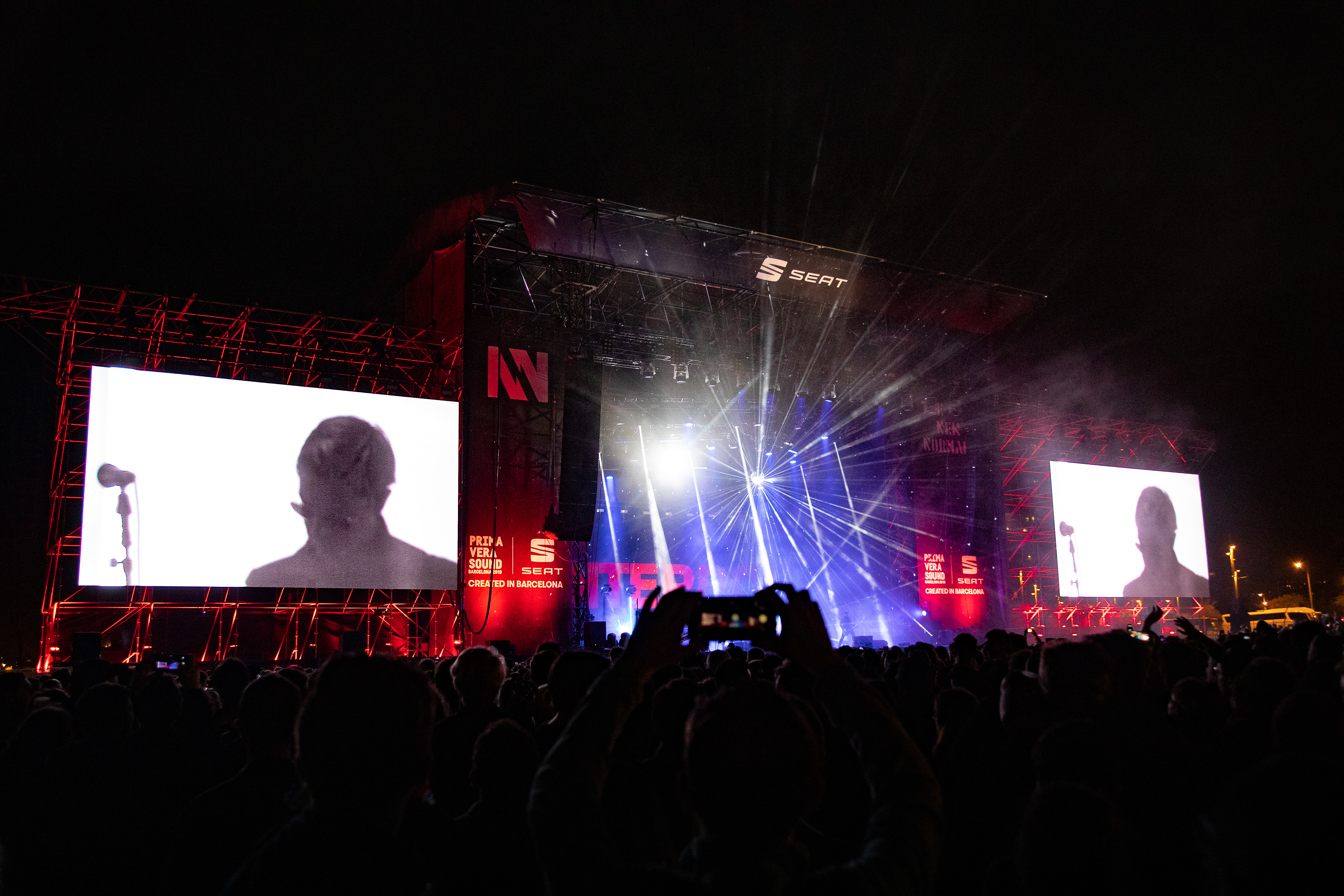
Main Stage at night

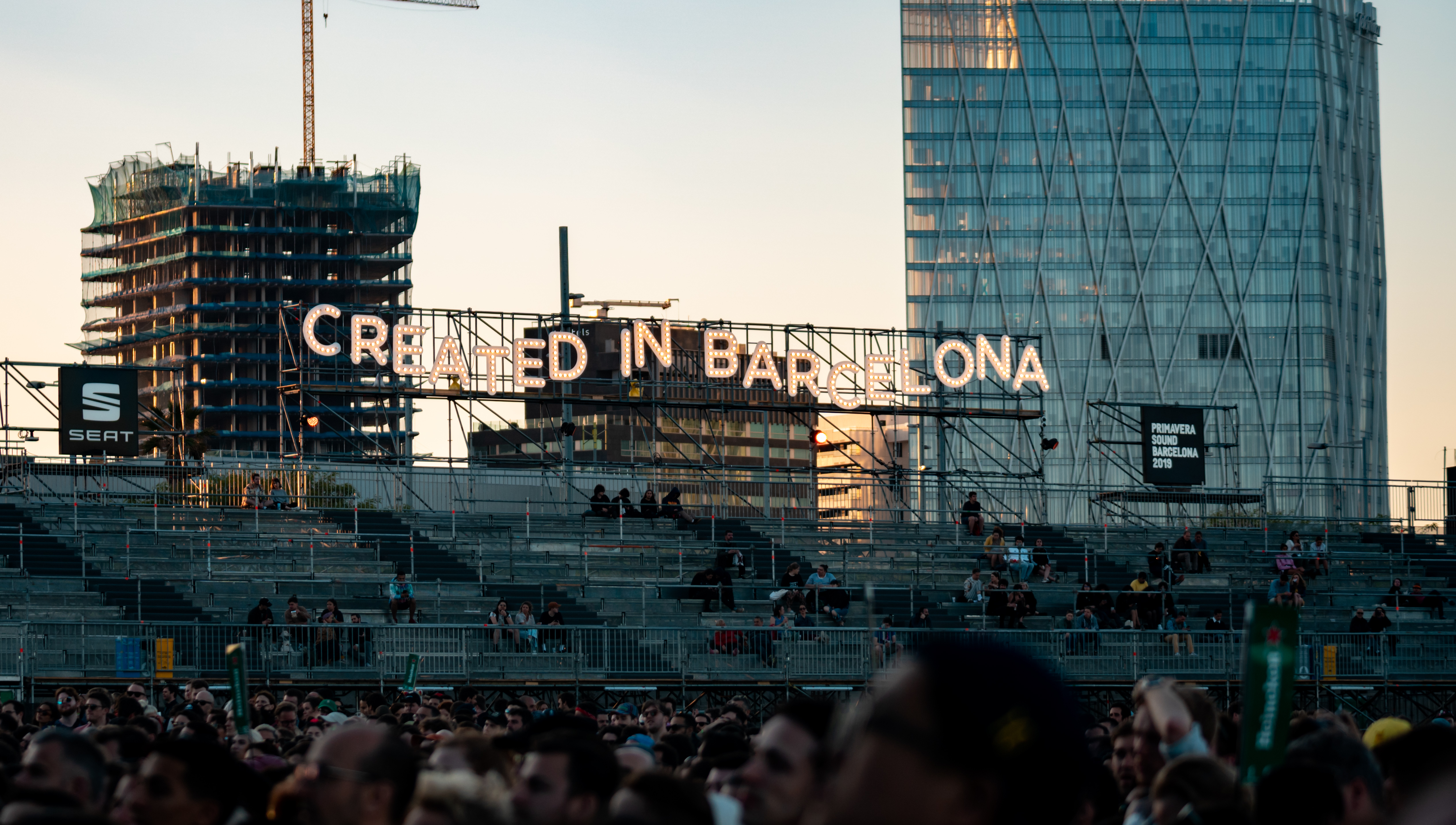
"Created in Barcelona" sign at Main Stage

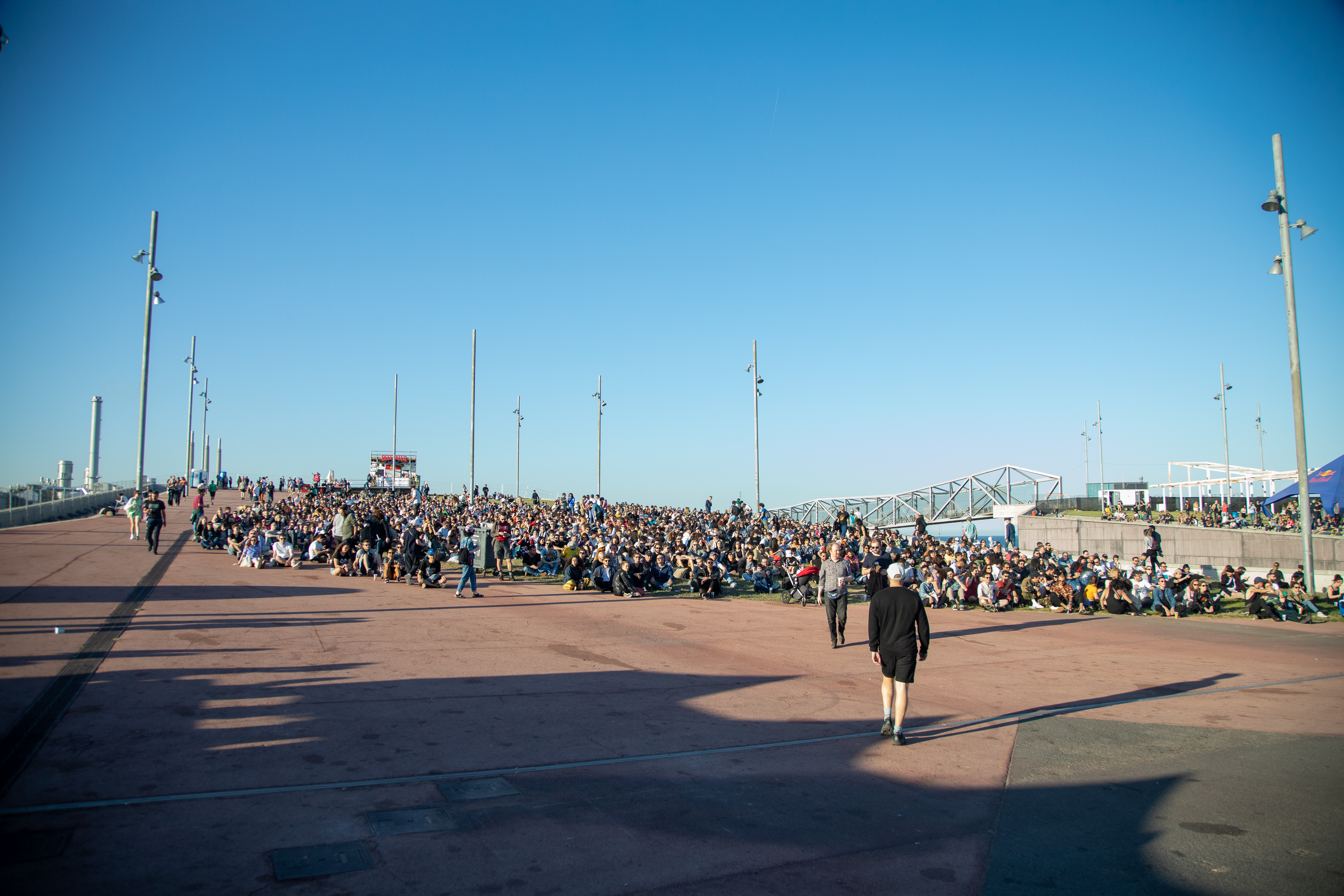
Primavera Stage

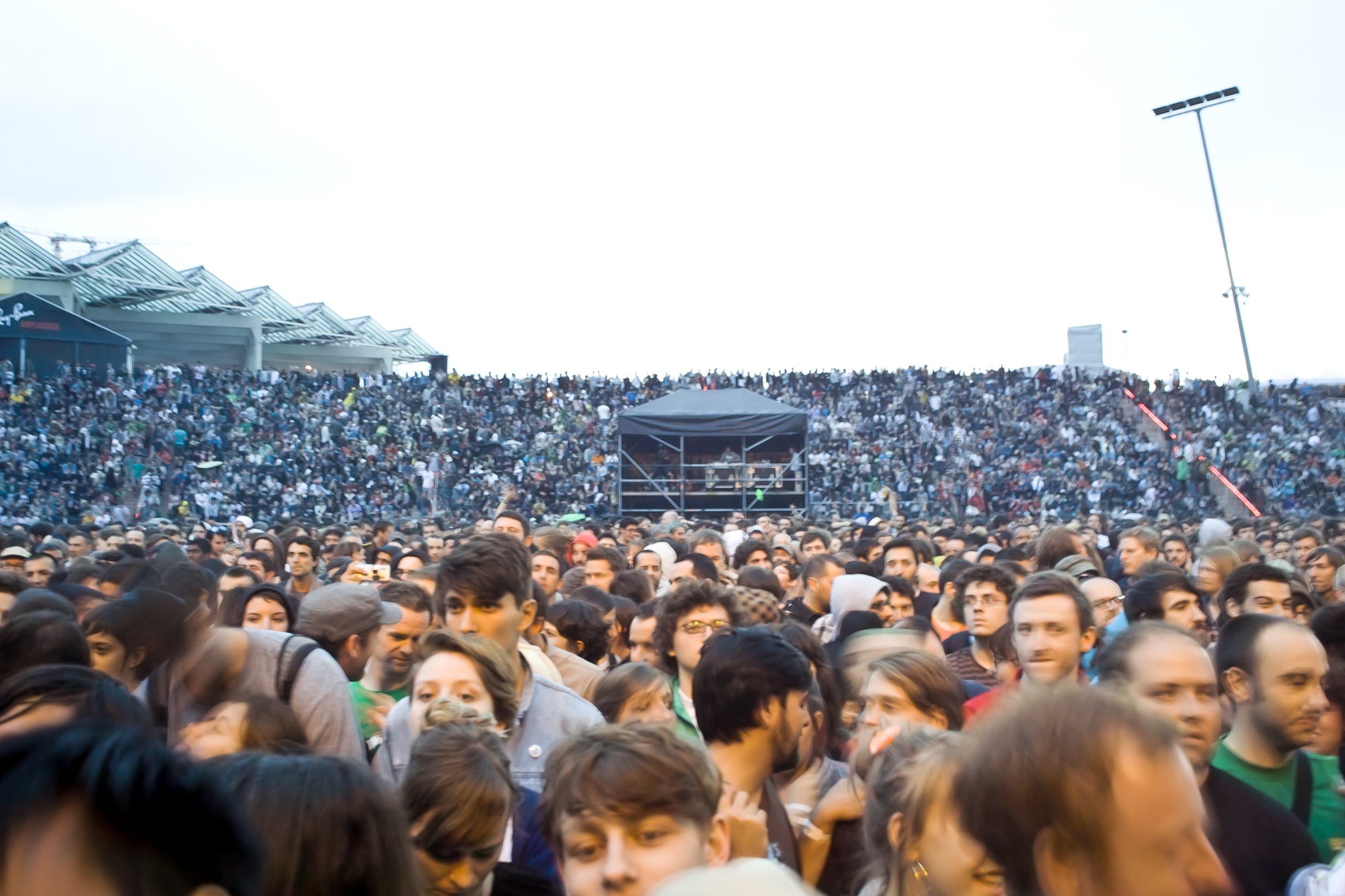
Primavera Stage

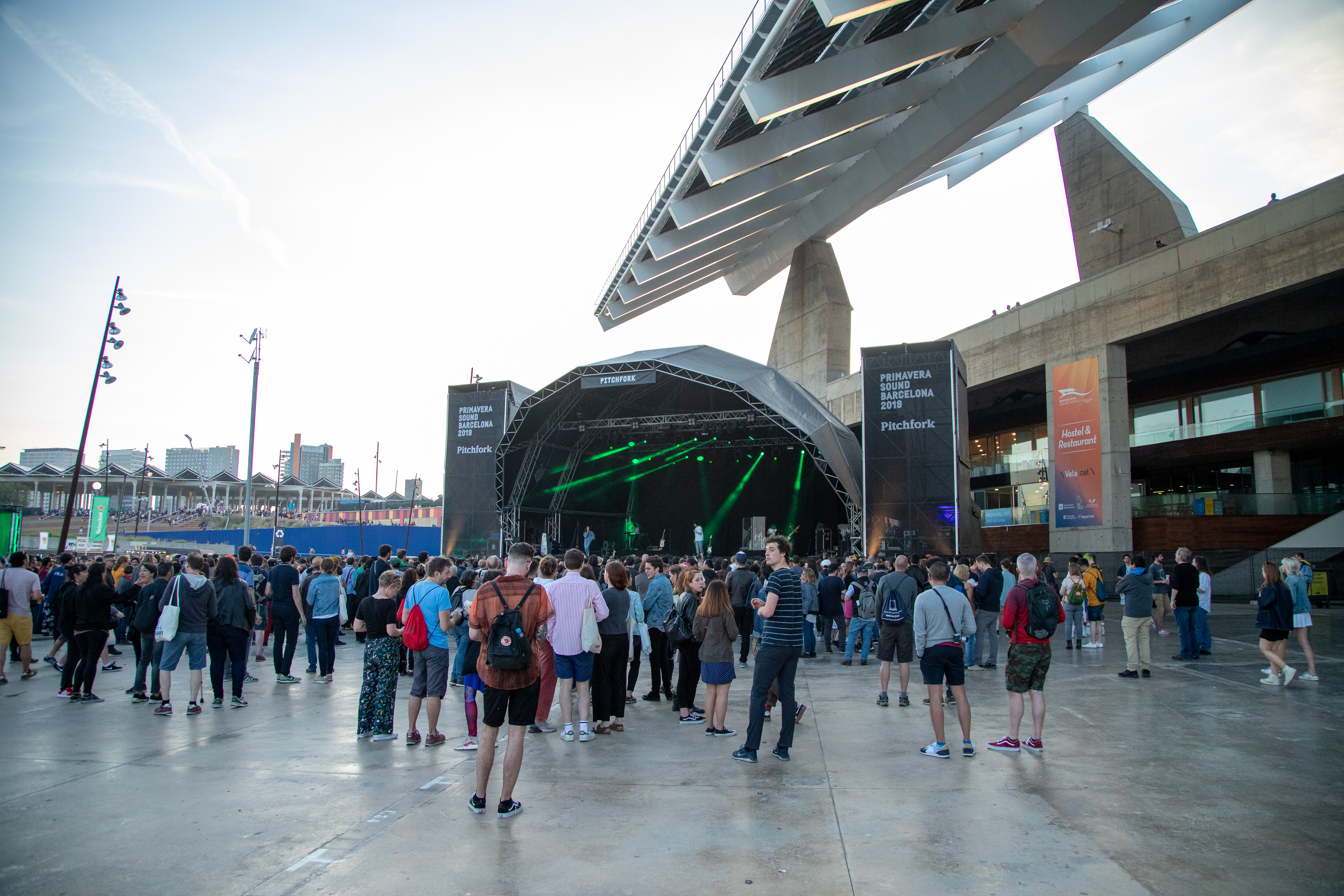
Schwartzkopf (Pitchfork) Stage

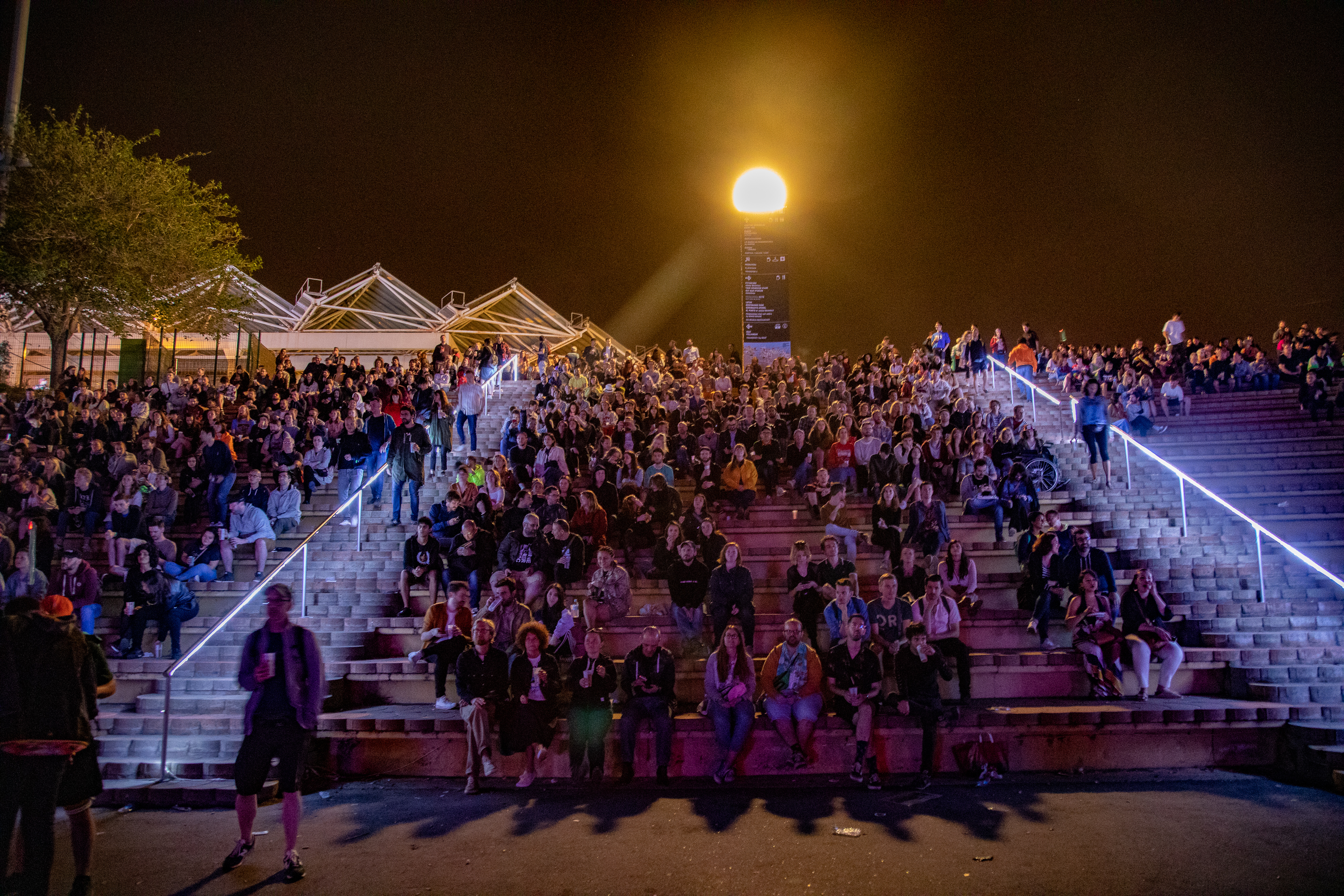
Cupra Stage

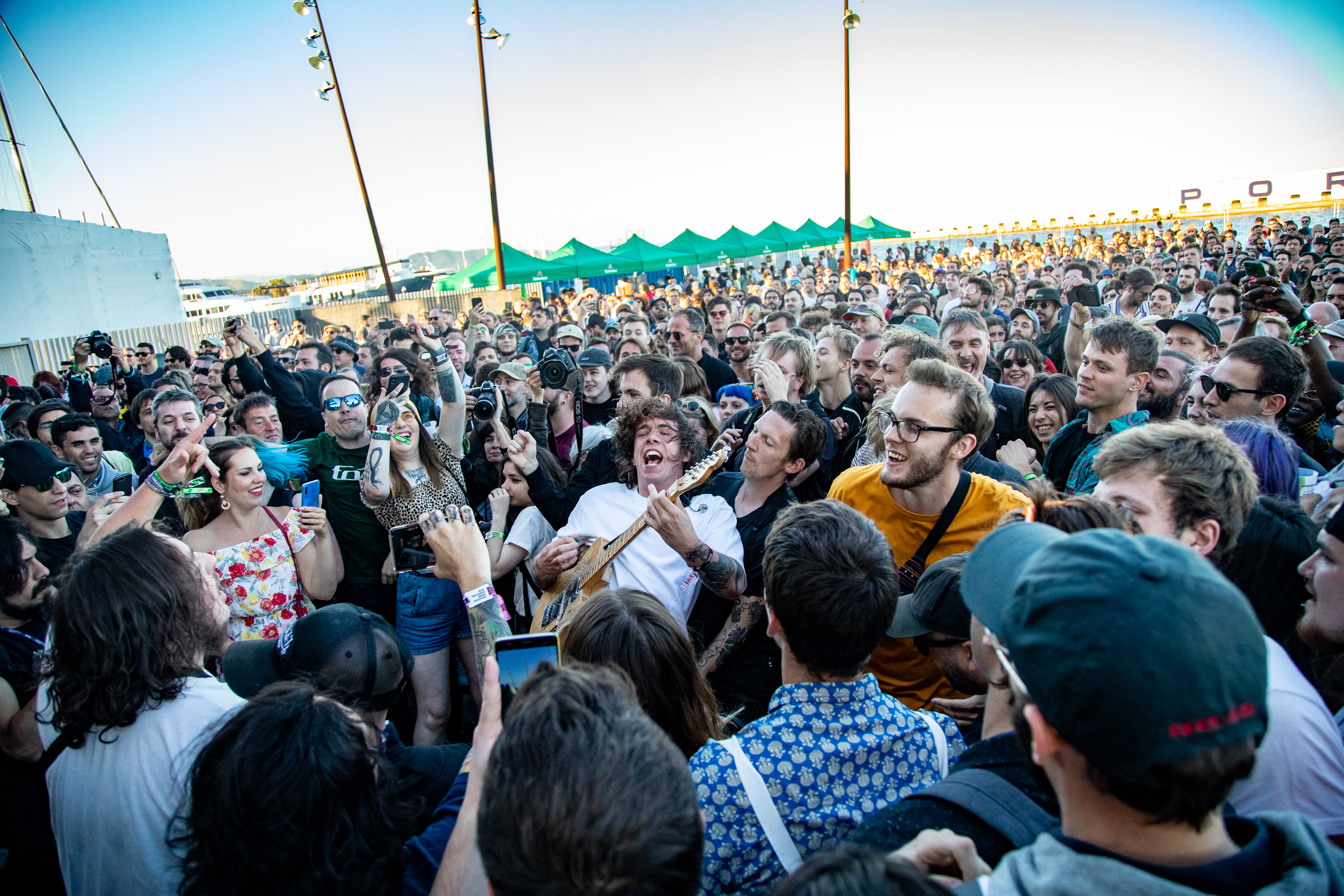
Adidas Stage

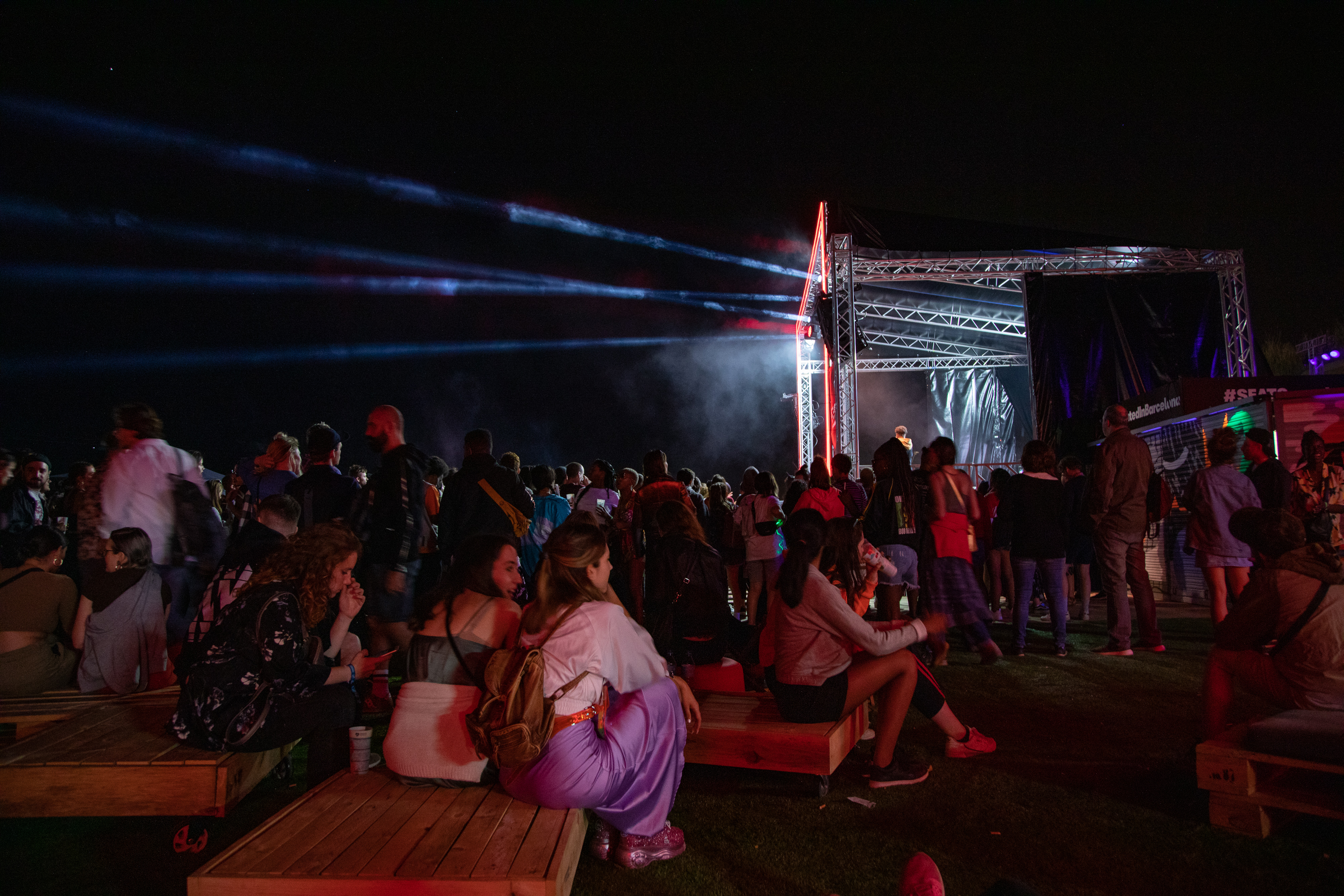
Seat Village Stage

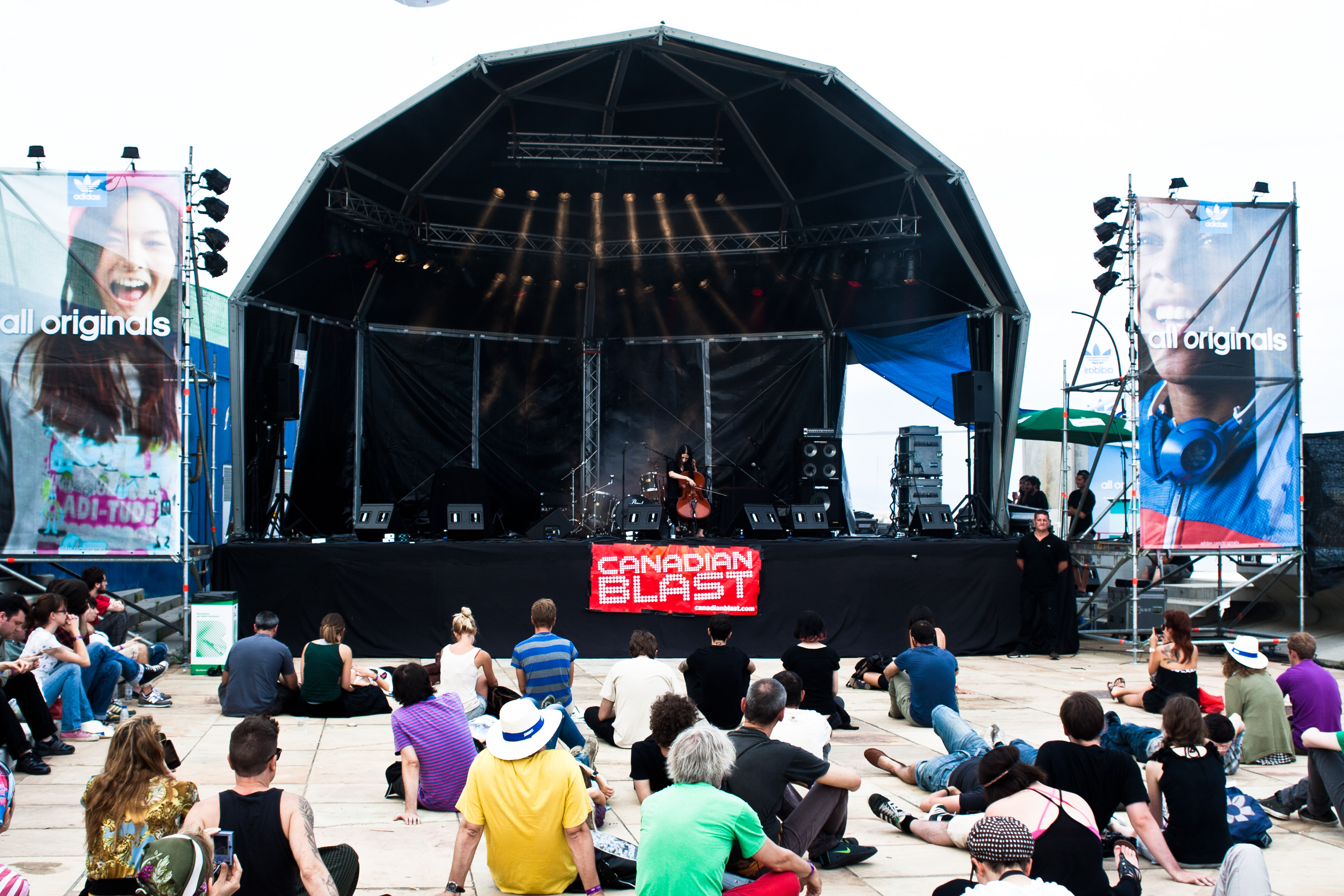
Your/Hidden Stage

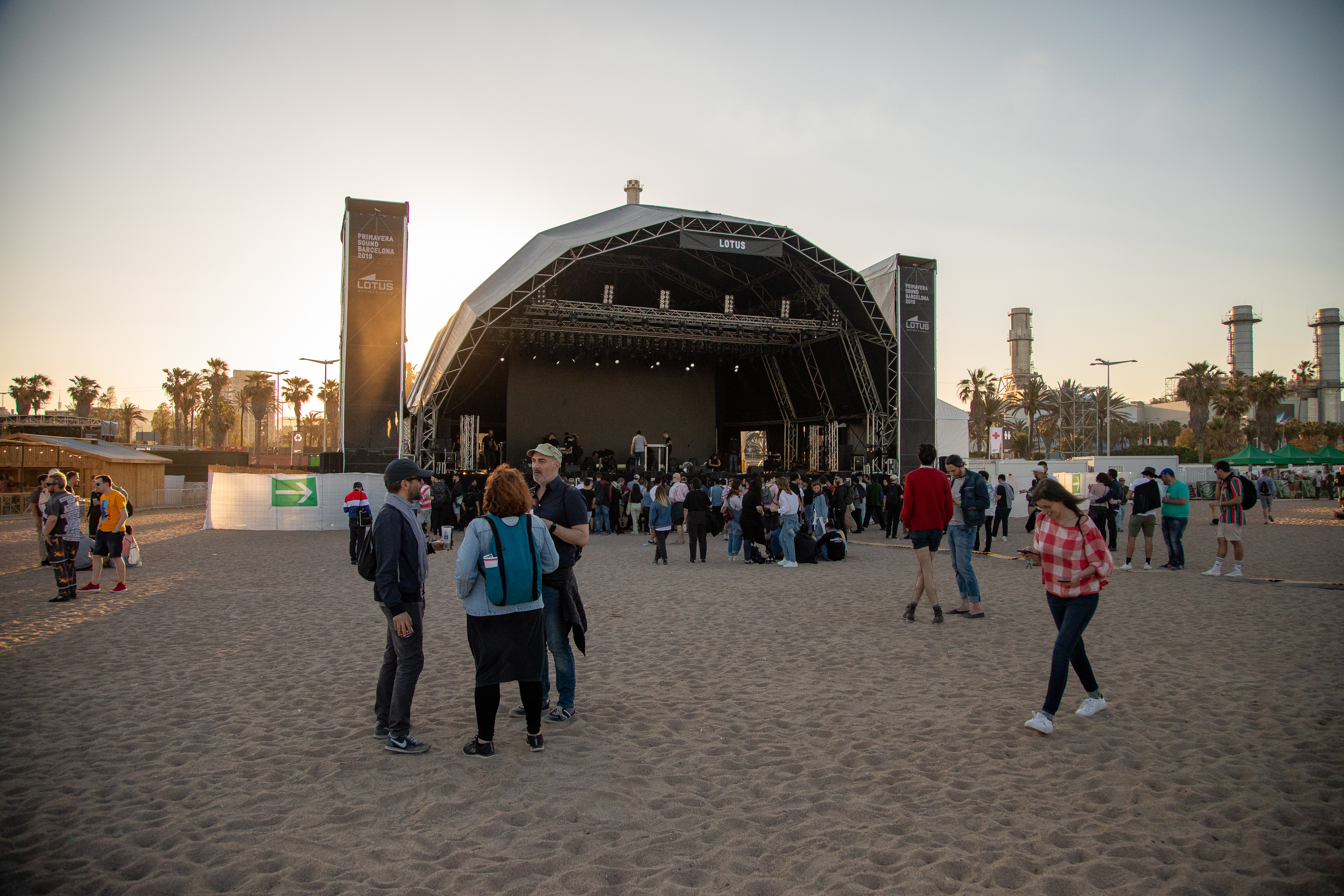
Lotus Stage

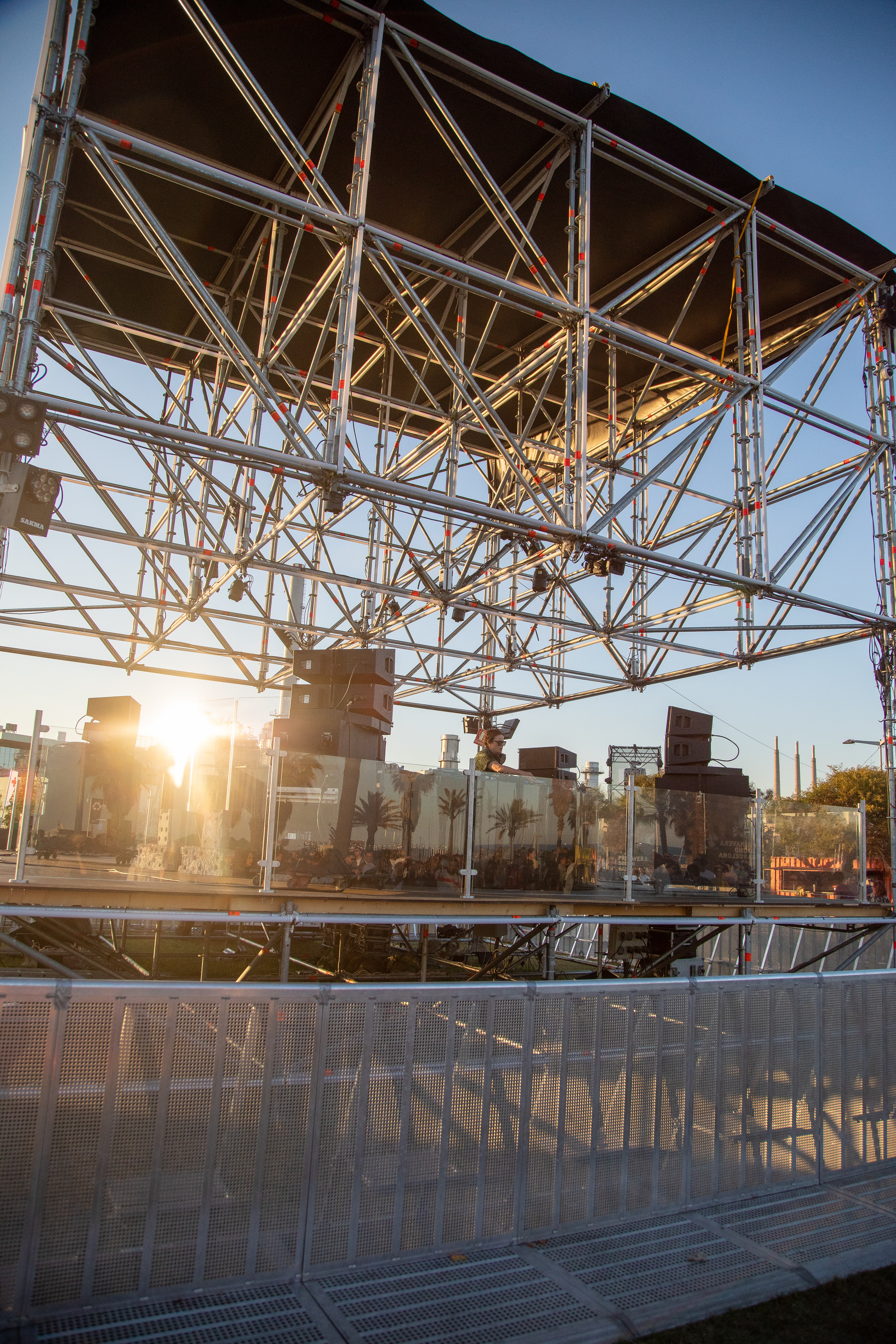
Desperados Cube

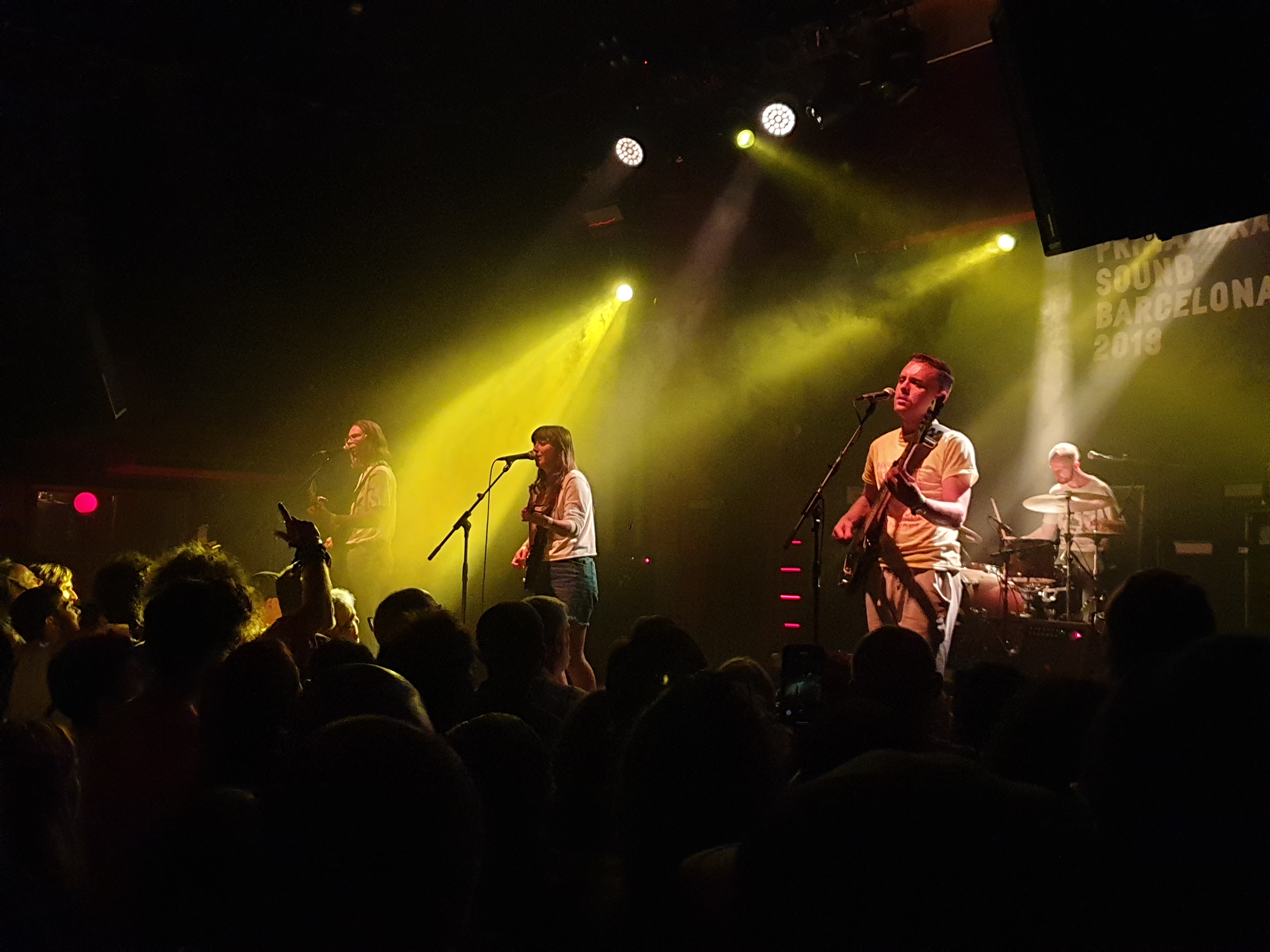
Sala Apolo during Primavera a la Ciutat

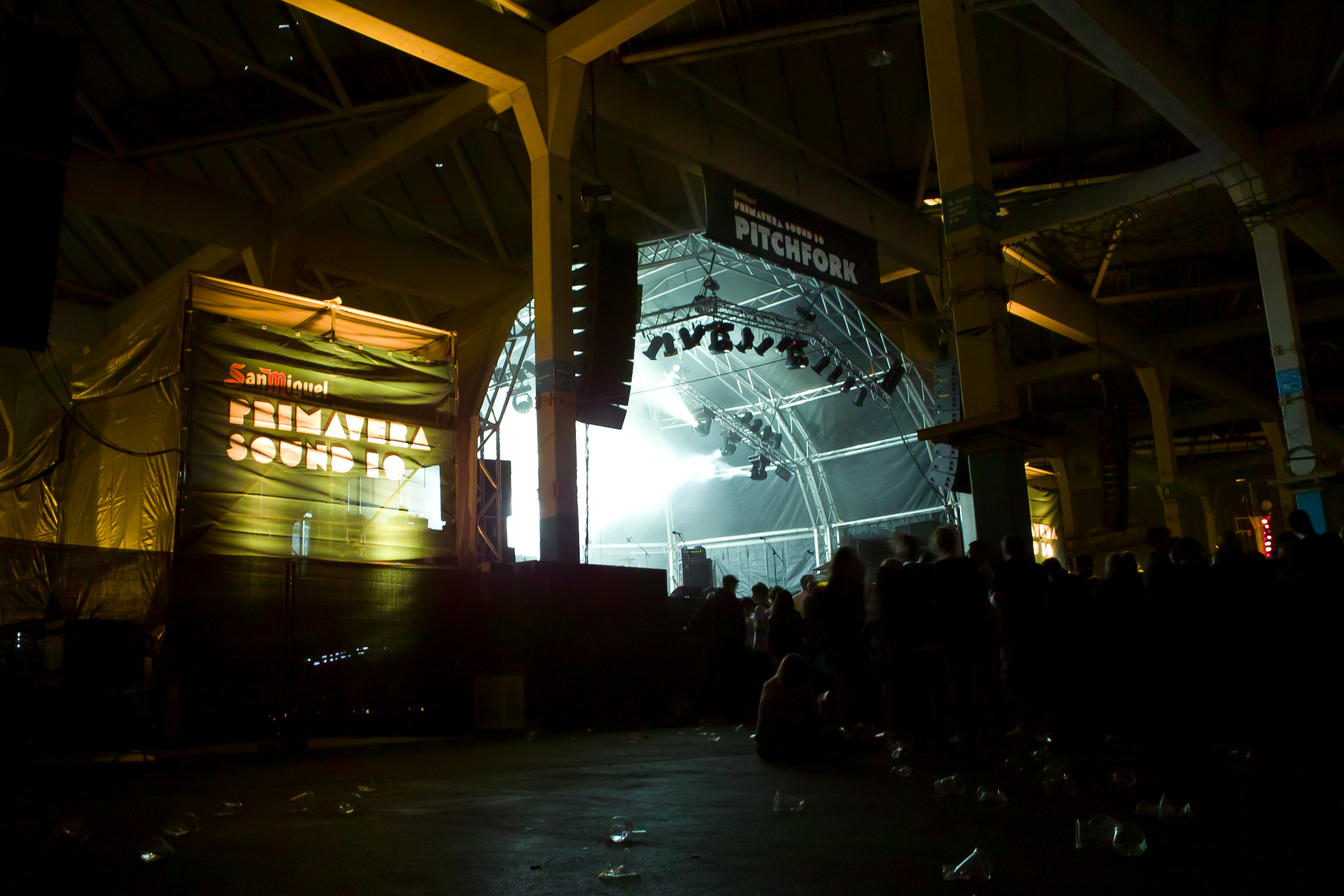
Interior tents

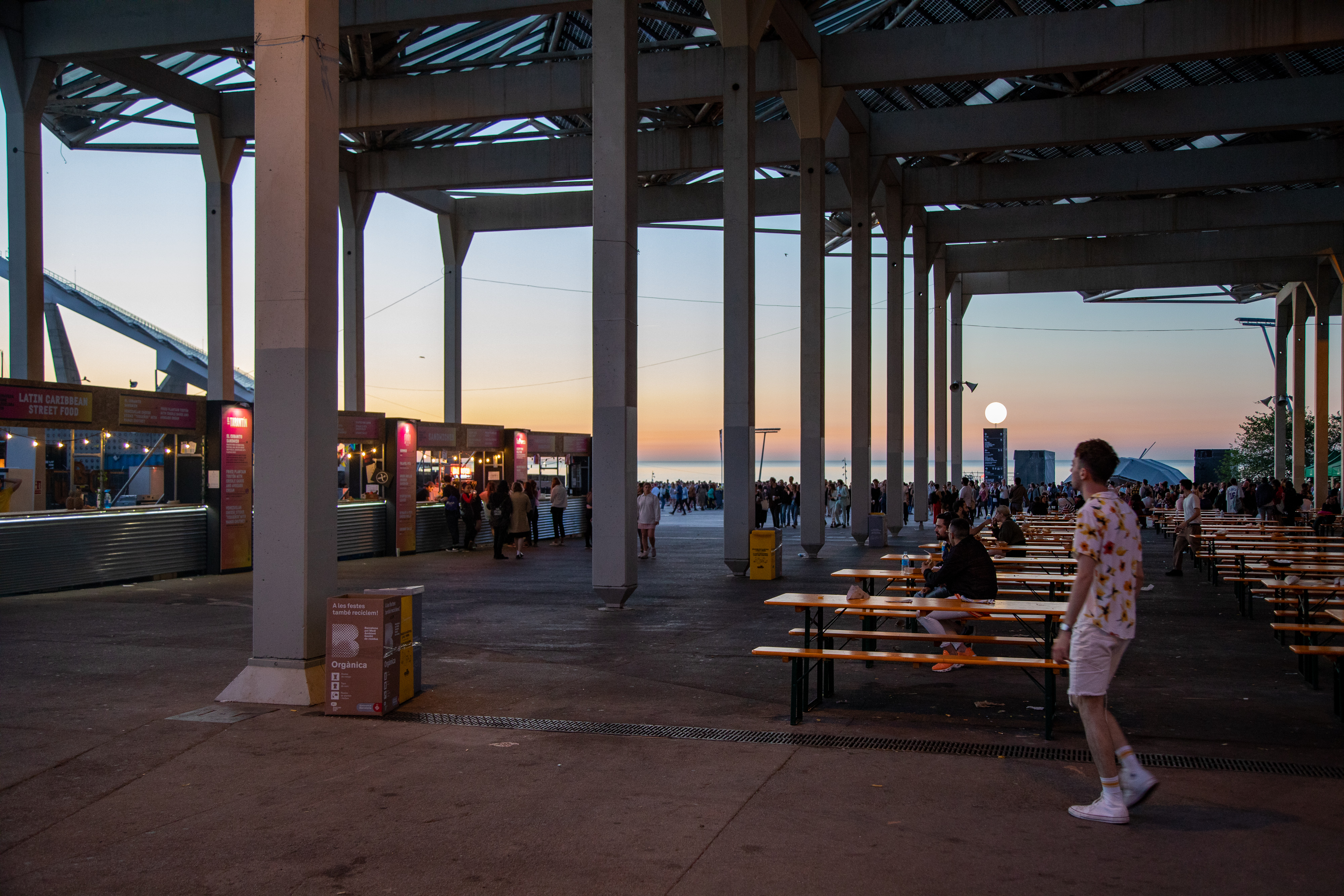
Resting area

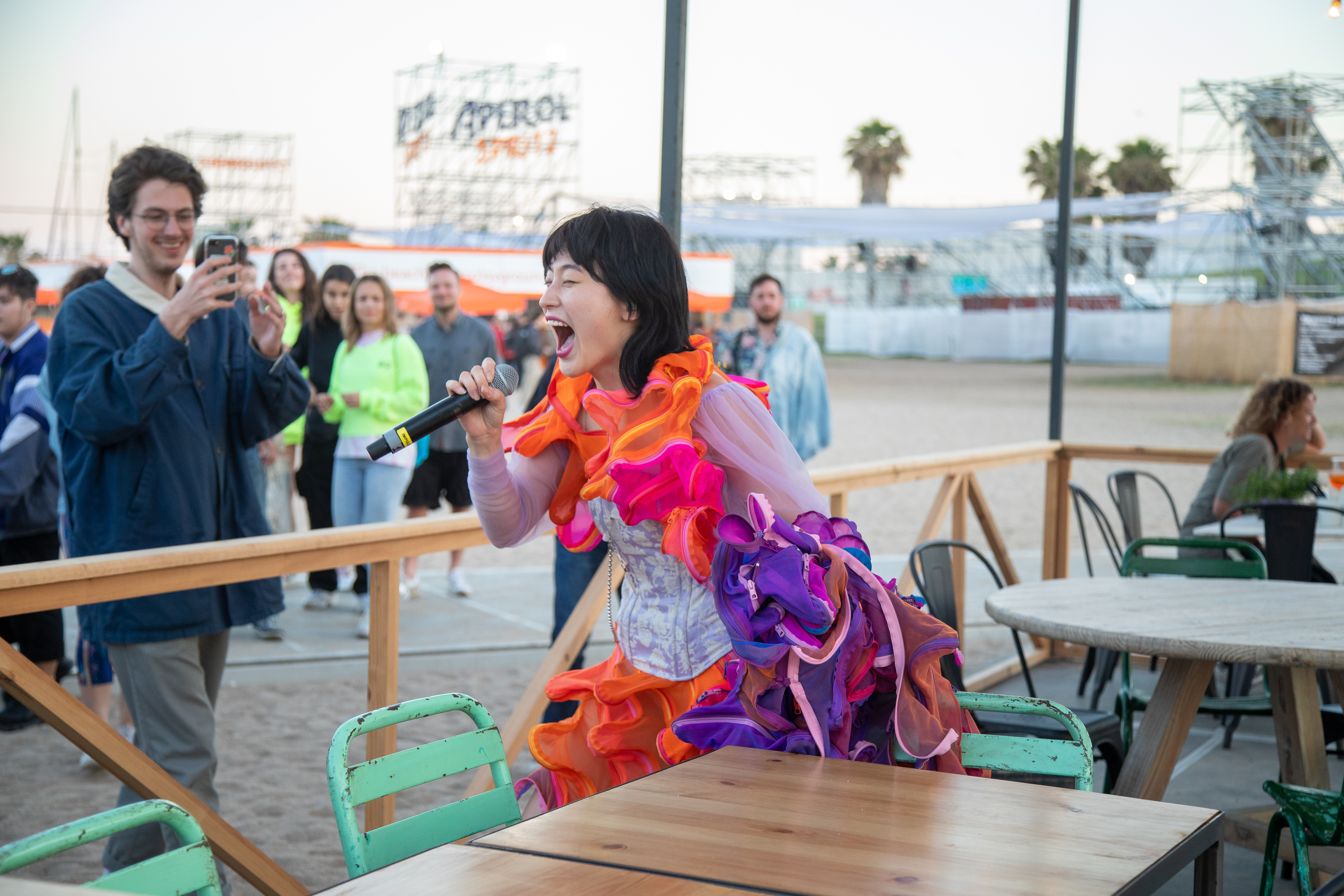
Resting Musical Area

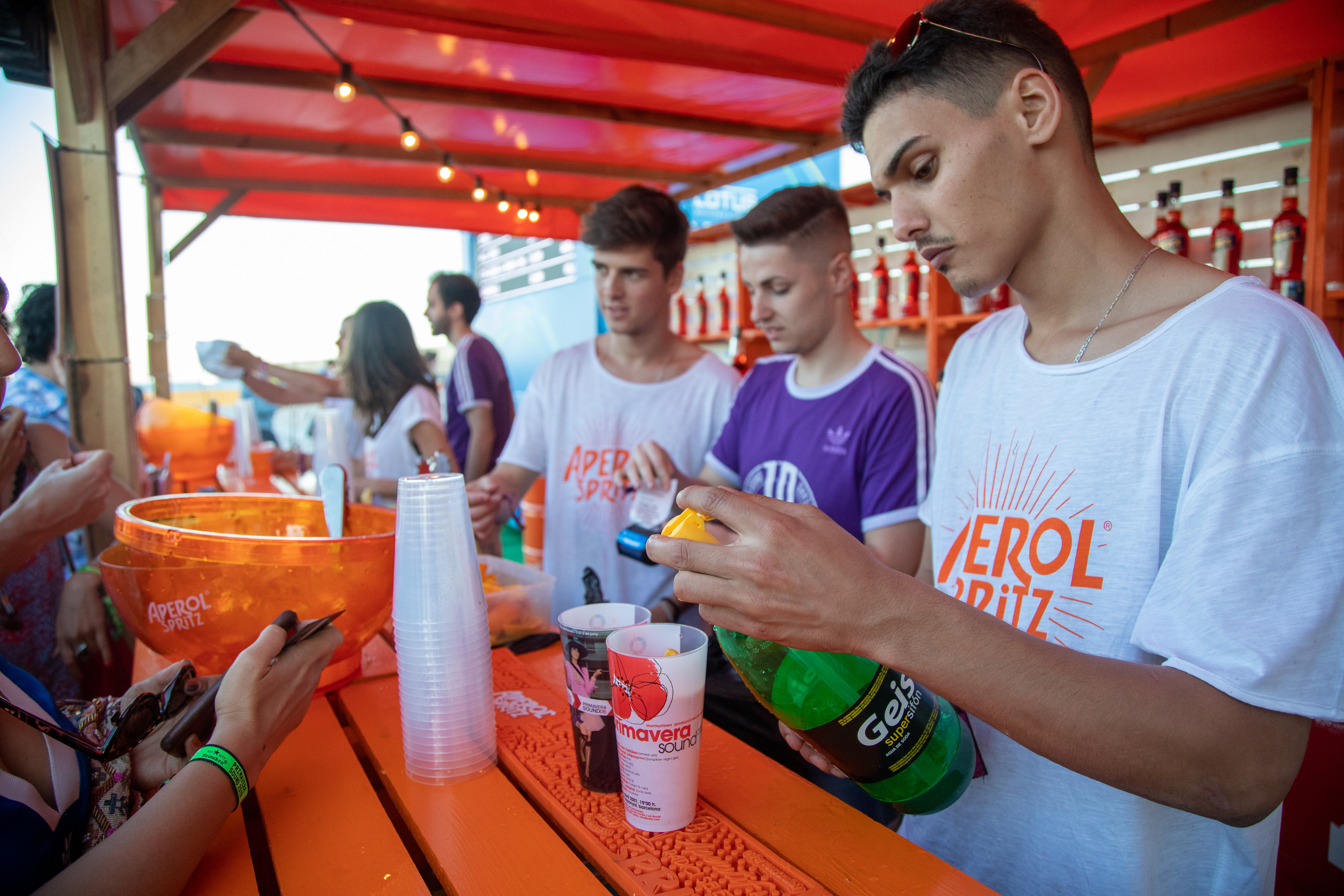
Bar area

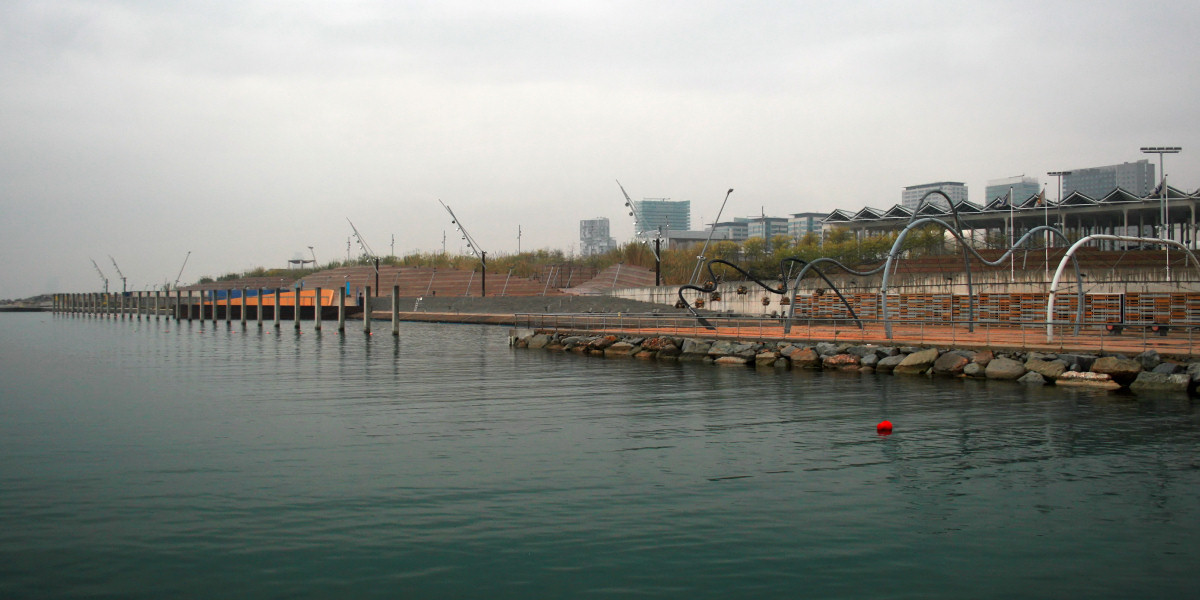
Bathing area

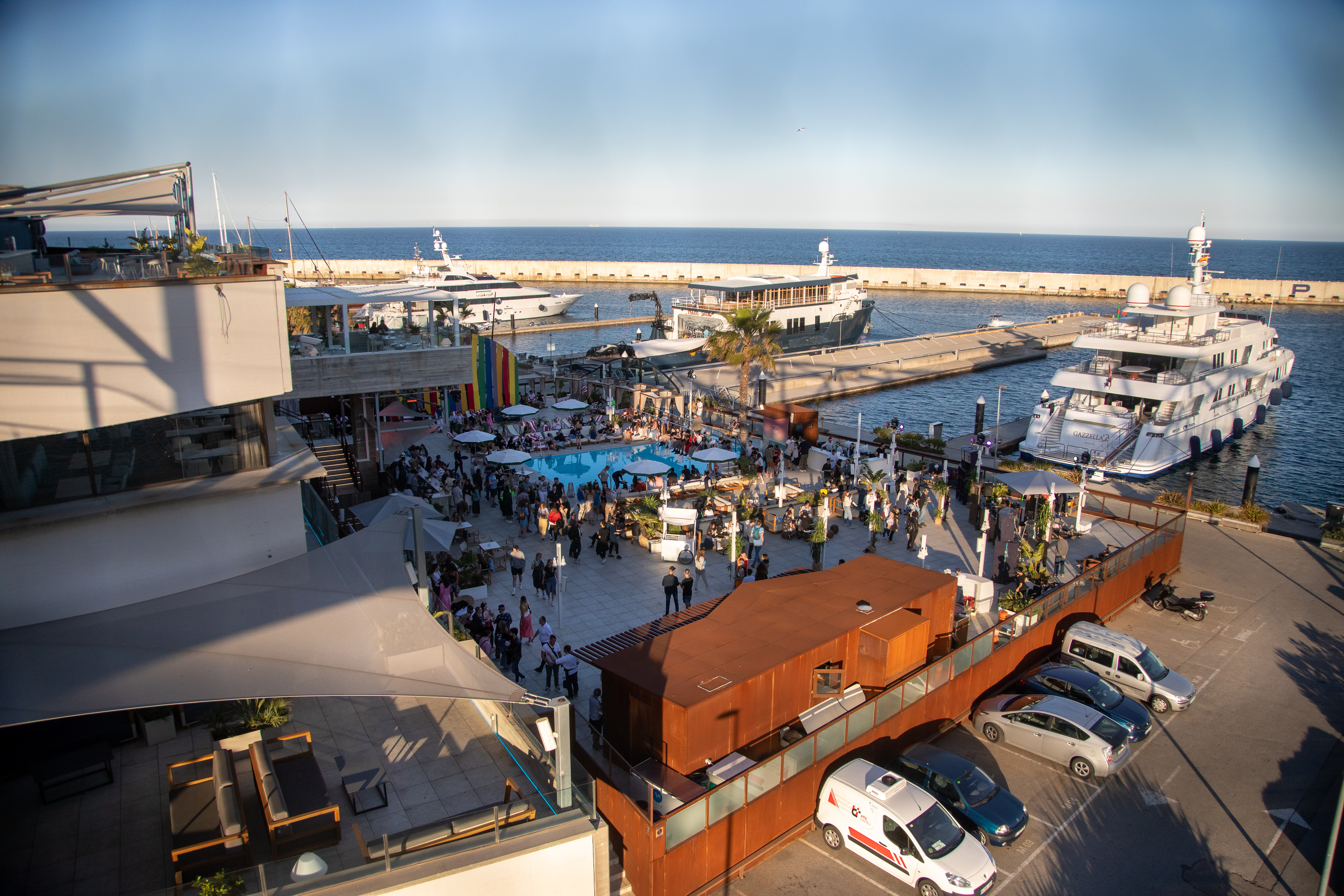
VIP area

== Festival summary by year ==
Edition	Year	Dates	Headliners	Attendance or sales	Avg. daily attendance/sales
1st	2001	April 28	No headliners	7,700	7,700
2nd	2002	May 17–18	Pulp · Spiritualized · Echo & the Bunnymen · Tindersticks	17,800	8,900
3rd	2003	May 23–24	Belle and Sebastian · Sonic Youth	24,200	11,000
4th	2004	May 27–29	Pixies · PJ Harvey · Primal Scream · Wilco	41,431	17,000
5th	2005	May 26–28	New Order · Stooges · Sonic Youth · Steve Earle	46,935	19,000
6th	2006	June 1–5	Motörhead · Yo La Tengo · Dinosaur Jr. · The Flaming Lips · Lou Reed · Stereolab · Violent Femmes	48,563	21,000
7th	2007	May 31–June 2	The Smashing Pumpkins · Sonic Youth · The White Stripes · Wilco · Patti Smith · Slint	61,782	20,000
8th	2008	May 29–31	Portishead · Public Enemy · Cat Power · Rufus Wainwright	59,129	26,000
9th	2009	May 28–30	Neil Young · My Bloody Valentine · Sonic Youth	76,080	25,000
10th	2010	May 27–29	Pixies · Pavement · Pet Shop Boys · Wilco · Orbital	101,200	30,000
11th	2011	May 26–28	The Flaming Lips · Grinderman · Pulp · Belle and Sebastian · Animal Collective · PJ Harvey	123,300	36.000
12th	2012	May 31–June 2	Franz Ferdinand · Wilco · The Cure · Justice (replacing Björk)	147,000	35,000
13th	2013	May 23–25	Phoenix · The Postal Service · Blur · The Jesus and Mary Chain · Nick Cave and the Bad Seeds · My Bloody Valentine	170,000	55,000
14th	2014	May 29–31	Arcade Fire · Queens of the Stone Age · The National · Pixies · Slowdive · Nine Inch Nails · Kendrick Lamar	190,000	55,000
15th	2015	May 28–30	The Black Keys · Anthony and the Johnsons · The Replacements · Alt-J · Patti Smith · The Strokes · Ride · Interpol · Underworld	195,000	55,000
16th	2016	June 1–4	Radiohead · LCD Soundsystem · Sigur Ros · PJ Harvey	207,435	56,000
17th	2017	May 31–June 3	Bon Iver · Aphex Twin · Frank Ocean (cancelled) · The xx · Arcade Fire · Van Morrison	208,400	57,000
18th	2018	May 30–June 3	Björk · Nick Cave and the Bad Seeds · The National · Migos (cancelled) · Arctic Monkeys · Lorde · A$AP Rocky	217,000	60,000
19th	2019	May 30–June 1	Erykah Badu · Future · Interpol · Tame Impala · Miley Cyrus (replacing Cardi B) · Janelle Monáe · Solange · J Balvin · Rosalía	220,000	63,000
20th	2022	June 2–12	Massive Attack (cancelled) · Pavement · Tame Impala · Beck · The National · The Strokes · Gorillaz · Jorja Smith · Nick Cave and the Bad Seeds · Tyler, the Creator · Dua Lipa · Interpol · Lorde · Megan Thee Stallion · Phoenix · Yeah Yeah Yeahs	460,500	76,600
21st	2023	June 1–3	Blur · Halsey · New Order · Kendrick Lamar · Depeche Mode · Rosalía · Calvin Harris	253,000	84,000
22nd	2024	May 30–June 1	Pulp · Vampire Weekend · Justice · Lana Del Rey · The National · Disclosure · SZA · PJ Harvey · Mitski · FKA Twigs (cancelled) · Charli XCX	268,000	89,000
23rd	2025	June 5–7	Charli XCX & Troye Sivan • Sabrina Carpenter • Chappell Roan	293,000	
24th	2026	June 4–6	The Cure • Doja Cat (cancelled) • The xx • Gorillaz • Massive Attack (cancelled) • Addison Rae • My Bloody Valentine • Skrillex • Bad Gyal (cancelled) • Olivia Rodrigo (surprise set)	287,000	
25th	2027	June 3–5	Fontaines D.C. • Phoebe Bridgers • Doechii		

== International editions ==
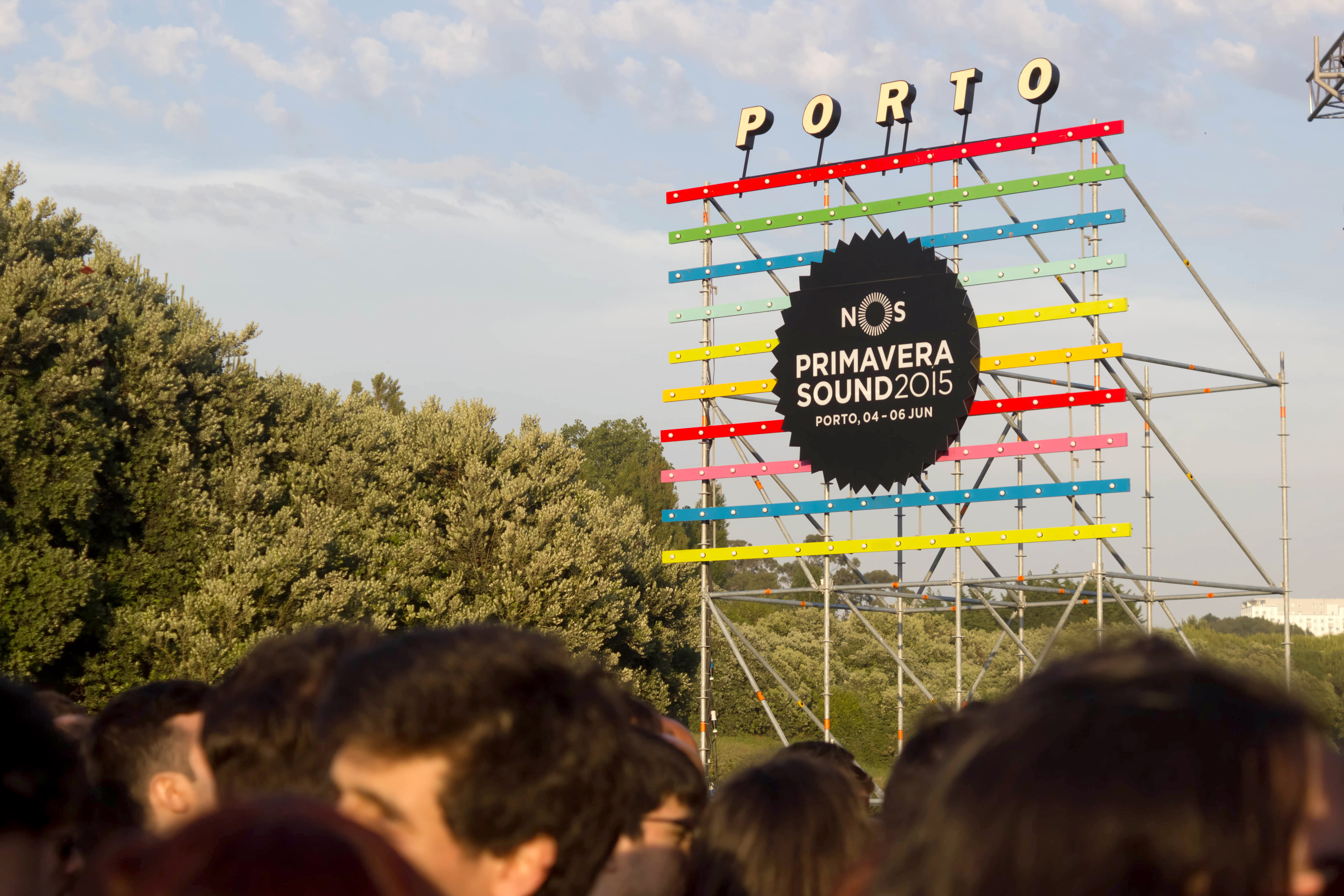
Primavera Sound Porto in 2015

In 2012, Primavera Sound launched a sister festival in Porto, Portugal, at the Parque da Cidade. Each year, this edition takes place one week after the main Barcelona edition and features a smaller selection of artists that play Barcelona. Alberto Guijarro, the festival's director, stated that “after years in Barcelona we organised a first edition in Porto to take advantage of musicians on tour, but it is a different type of event; what we do in Portugal is a Primavera boutique, more well-kept, smaller and with its own personality". From 2012 to 2014, Porto's festival was billed as Optimus Primavera Sound, and from 2015 to 2022, it was billed as NOS Primavera Sound.

Upon the conclusion of the 2019 festival in Barcelona, Primavera Sound announced new editions in Los Angeles Historic Park in the United States, scheduled for September 2020, and London's Drumsheds venue, for June 2020. However, Primavera pulled out of the London plans over time constraints and concerns over permits and licenses. The London edition was scheduled to replace or merge with Field Day.

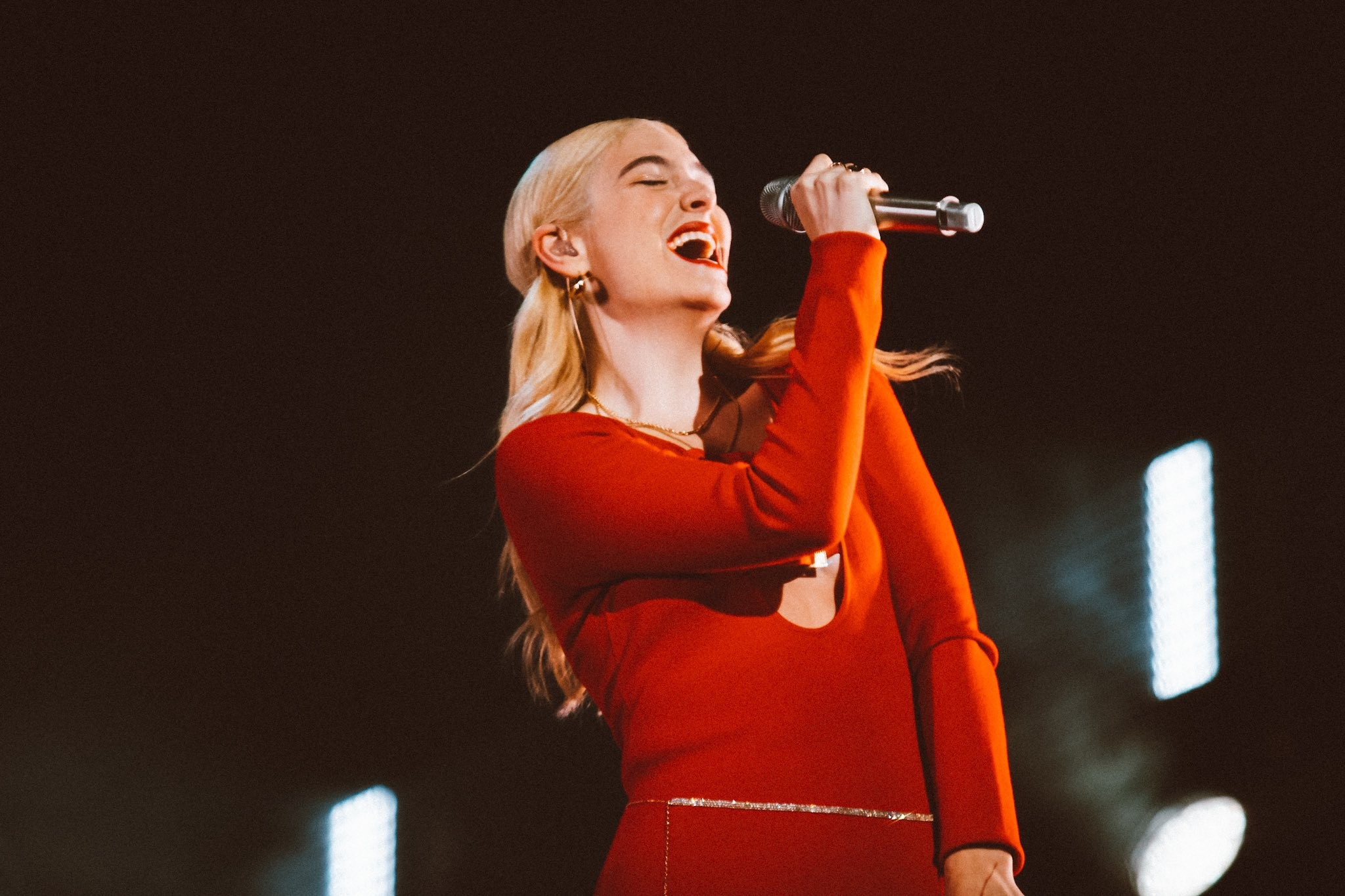
Lorde performing at Primavera Sound São Paulo in 2022

The first Los Angeles edition, co-produced by Live Nation, occurred from September 16–18, 2022 and was headlined by Lorde, Arctic Monkeys and Nine Inch Nails. The editions in São Paulo, Buenos Aires and Santiago all took place from October to November 2022, and were all headlined by Arctic Monkeys, Björk, Lorde and Travis Scott. It was notably Scott's first festival booking since the Astroworld Festival crowd crush. Other international performers at these editions included Arca, Beach House, Cat Power, Caroline Polachek, Charli XCX, Father John Misty, Japanese Breakfast, José González, Interpol, Mitski, and Phoebe Bridgers.

The expansion into Latin America continued in 2023, with a one-day event in Asunción, Paraguay as Primavera Day Asuncion. However, the Los Angeles edition did not continue because of an oversaturated American market and inconvenient scheduling. A first edition was supposed to be held in Bogotá, Colombia, but on 17 October 2023, the festival was cancelled and rebranded as "Road to Primavera" featuring just five of the original 29 listed artists because of low ticket sales and instability in Colombia. There was also a "Road to Primavera" in Lima, Peru. The Cure were announced as headliners for all South American editions; other headliners included Grimes, Beck, Pet Shop Boys, Blur, The Killers and The Hives. Following The Cure's first-ever performance in Uruguay on 27 November 2023, a one-day event was announced for Montevideo on 21 November 2024 as Primavera Day Montevideo.

On 30 August 2024, Primavera Sound announced that all Latin American editions that year were cancelled. They did not return in 2025. In October 2025, Primavera Sound announced the return of editions in Buenos Aires and São Paulo for 2026, the first in three years. Both editions were headlined by Gorillaz and The Strokes.

=== Active editions ===
==== Porto ====
Edition	Year	Dates	Headliners
1st	2012	June 8–10	The Flaming Lips · The xx (replacing Björk) · Wilco
2nd	2013	May 30–June 1	Blur · Nick Cave and the Bad Seeds · James Blake · My Bloody Valentine
3rd	2014	June 5–7	The National · Pixies · Kendrick Lamar · Caetano Veloso · Neutral Milk Hotel · Mogwai
4th	2015	June 4–6	Interpol · Antony and the Johnsons · Ride · Underworld
5th	2016	June 9–11	Sigur Rós · PJ Harvey · Air
6th	2017	June 8–10	Bon Iver · Aphex Twin · Justice
7th	2018	June 7–9	Nick Cave and the Bad Seeds · Lorde · A$AP Rocky
8th	2019	June 6–8	Solange · Stereolab · J Balvin · Interpol · Erykah Badu · Rosalía
9th	2022	June 9–11	Tame Impala · Nick Cave and the Bad Seeds · Pavement · Beck · Gorillaz · Interpol
10th	2023	June 7–10	Kendrick Lamar · Rosalía · Pet Shop Boys · Blur · Halsey
11th	2024	June 6–8	SZA · PJ Harvey · Mitski · Lana Del Rey · Justice (cancelled) · Pulp · The National
12th	2025	June 12–14	Charli XCX · Central Cee · Jamie xx
13th	2026	June 11–14	The xx · Gorillaz · Massive Attack · Sensible Soccers

==== São Paulo ====
Edition	Year	Dates	Headliners
1st	2022	October 31–November 6	Arctic Monkeys · Björk · Lorde · Travis Scott
2nd	2023	December 2–3	Beck · The Cure · The Killers · Pet Shop Boys
3rd	2026	December 5–6	Gorillaz · The Strokes

==== Buenos Aires ====
Edition	Year	Dates	Headliners
1st	2022	October 14, November 7–13	Arctic Monkeys · Björk · Charli XCX · Jack White · Lorde · Mitski · Pixies · Travis Scott
2nd	2023	November 25–26	Beck · Blur · The Cure · Pet Shop Boys
3rd	2026	November 28–29	Gorillaz · The Strokes

=== Defunct editions ===
==== Los Angeles ====
Year	Dates	Headliners
2022	September 16–18	Arctic Monkeys · Lorde · Nine Inch Nails

==== Santiago de Chile ====
Year	Dates	Headliners
2022	November 7–13	Arctic Monkeys · Björk · Jack White · Lorde · Pixies · Travis Scott

==== Madrid ====
Year	Dates	Headliners
2023	June 9–10 (Note: The inaugural edition of Primavera Sound Madrid was scheduled to begin on June 8. However, due to heavy rain, the venue booked in Arganda del Rey flooded, cancelling the first day of the festival, headlined by Blur, Halsey, and New Order.)	Blur (cancelled) · Halsey (cancelled) · New Order (cancelled) · Kendrick Lamar · Depeche Mode · Rosalía · Calvin Harris

==== Asunción ====
Edition	Year	Dates	Headliners
1st	2023	December 7	The Cure · Grimes

== Prizes and awards ==
- Prizes of the Independent Music 2011 (organized by UFI): Better festival
- Altaveu 2011 Award
- Greener Festival Award 2012: in the category "Highly Commended"
- European Festival Awards: Artists' Favourite Festival in 2014
- Reward Waves of the Music 2014: Better musical spectacle
- Premi Continuarà-Vespre to La2 of Culture 2015
- Gold Medal of Merit in the Fine Arts (2025)
