= List of awards and nominations received by Troye Sivan =

Troye Sivan awards and nominations
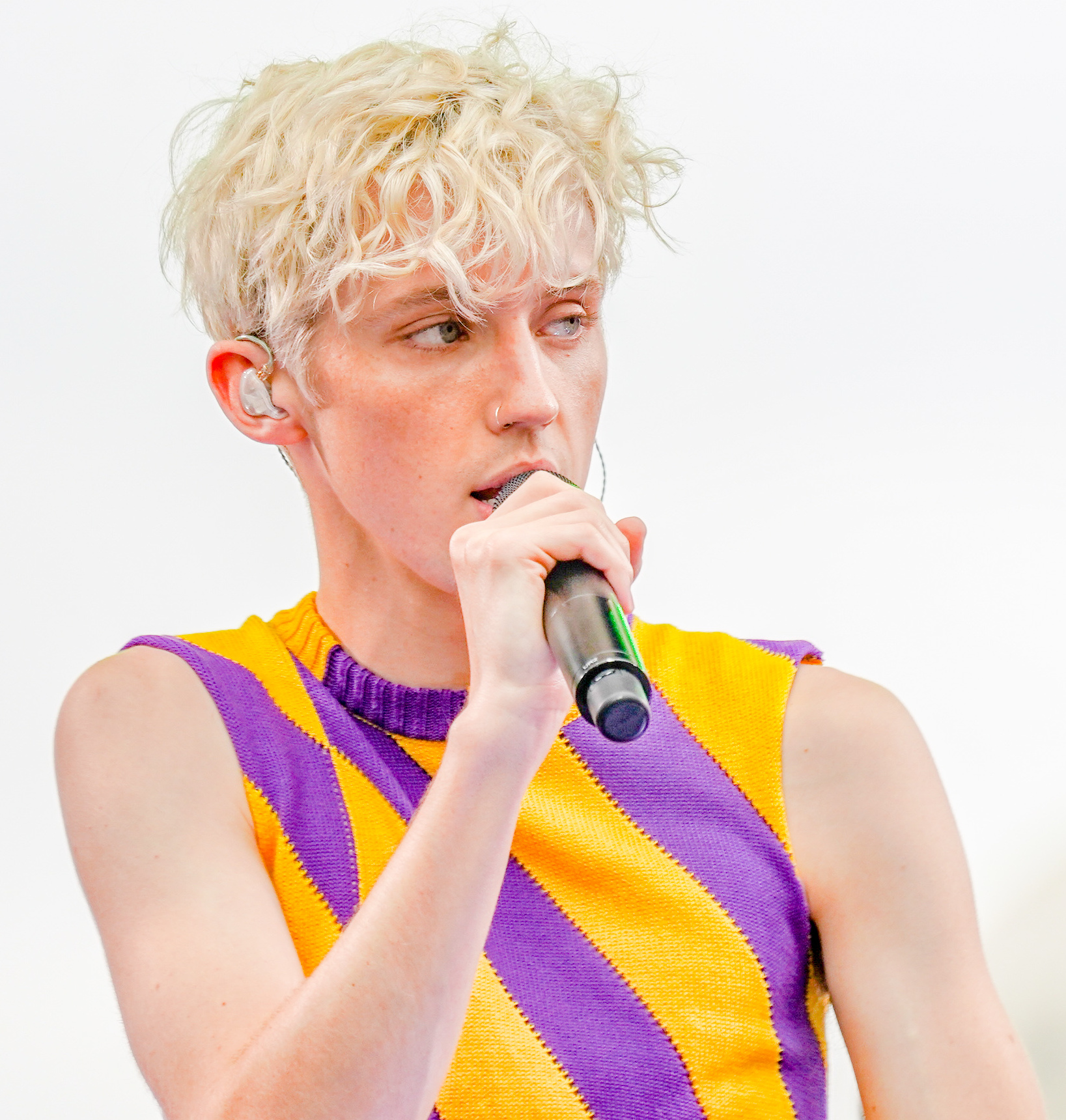
- Sivan performing in 2018
Awards and nominations
Award	Wins	Nominations
ARIA Music Awards	8	22
APRA Music Awards	3	10
Billboard Music Awards	0	2
Golden Globe Awards	0	1
Grammy Awards	0	3
iHeartRadio Music Awards	0	3
MTV Europe Music Awards	3	5
MTV Video Music Awards	0	3

Totals (Note: Certain award groups do not simply award one winner. They acknowledge several different recipients, have runners-up, and have third place. Since this is a specific recognition and is different from losing an award, runner-up mentions are considered wins in this award tally. For simplification and to avoid errors, each award in this list has been presumed to have had a prior nomination.)
- Wins: 29
- Nominations: 114

Australian singer-songwriter and actor Troye Sivan has received many awards and nominations throughout his career. Sivan began his career on YouTube, reaching over eight million subscribers as of 2023 and winning an award at the 2014 Teen Choice Awards.

In 2015, Sivan won Artist on the Rise at the 2015 MTV Europe Music Awards and received his first APRA Music Award nomination for Breakthrough Songwriter of the Year. In 2016, he won the MTV Europe Music Award for the Best Worldwide Act (Note: Sivan won the award for Best Australian Act.) and was also nominated for seven ARIA Music Awards winning Best Video and Song of the Year for "Youth"; he was also nominated for Breakthrough Long Form Video at 2016 MTV Video Music Awards for the video trilogy from Sivan's debut studio album, Blue Neighbourhood, that featured the songs "Wild", "Fools" and "Talk Me Down". In 2017, Sivan was honoured with the Stephen F. Kolzak Award at the 28th GLAAD Media Awards.

In 2018, he released his second studio album, Bloom; the album was met with widespread acclaim from critics and was nominated for three awards at the ARIA Music Awards of 2018, including Album of the Year. At the 76th Golden Globe Awards, Sivan was nominated for Best Original Song for his song "Revelation" with Jónsi for the film Boy Erased.

In 2023, Sivan released the lead single, "Rush", for his third studio album, Something to Give Each Other. The song won Song of the Year at the 2023 ARIA Music Awards and was nominated for an MTV Video Music Award. It also received two nominations at the 66th Annual Grammy Awards for Best Pop Dance Recording and Best Music Video. Sivan was named GQ Australia's 2023 Man of the Year.

== Music and web awards ==
Award	Year (Note: Indicates the year of ceremony. Each year is linked to the article about the awards held that year, wherever possible.)	Category	Work	Result	Ref.
AIR Awards	2023	Best Independent Dance, Electronica or Club Single	"You Know What I Need" (with PNAU)	Nominated	
ARIA Music Awards	2016	Album of the Year	Blue Neighbourhood	Nominated	
ARIA Music Awards	2016	Best Male Artist	Blue Neighbourhood	Nominated	
ARIA Music Awards	2016	Best Pop Release	Blue Neighbourhood	Nominated	
ARIA Music Awards	2016	Best Video	"Youth"	Won	
ARIA Music Awards	2016	Song of the Year	"Youth"	Won	
ARIA Music Awards	2018	Album of the Year	Bloom	Nominated	
ARIA Music Awards	2018	Best Male Artist	Bloom	Nominated	
ARIA Music Awards	2018	Best Pop Release	Bloom	Nominated	
ARIA Music Awards	2018	Song of the Year	"My My My!"	Nominated	
ARIA Music Awards	2020	Best Male Artist	In a Dream	Nominated	
ARIA Music Awards	2020	Best Pop Release	In a Dream	Nominated	
ARIA Music Awards	2020	Best Video	"Easy"	Nominated	
ARIA Music Awards	2021	Best Video	"Could Cry Just Thinkin About You"	Nominated	
ARIA Music Awards	2023	Best Dance Release	"You Know What I Need" (with PNAU)	Nominated	
ARIA Music Awards	2023	Best Pop Release	"Rush"	Nominated	
ARIA Music Awards	2023	Best Solo Artist	"Rush"	Won	
ARIA Music Awards	2023	Song of the Year	"Rush"	Won	
ARIA Music Awards	2024	Album of the Year	Something to Give Each Other	Won	
ARIA Music Awards	2024	Best Solo Artist	Something to Give Each Other	Won	
ARIA Music Awards	2024	Best Pop Release	Something to Give Each Other	Won	
ARIA Music Awards	2024	Song of the Year	"Got Me Started"	Nominated	
ARIA Music Awards	2025	Best Australian Live Act	Something to Give Each Other Tour	Won	
ARIA Music Awards	2026	Best Pop Release	"She's the Best"	Pending	
ARIA Music Awards	2026	Best Produced Release	"She's the Best" (Note: Shared with Styalz Fuego)	Pending	
ARIA Music Awards	2026	Best Solo Artist	"She's the Best"	Pending	
APRA Music Awards	2015	Breakthrough Songwriter of the Year	—	Nominated	
APRA Music Awards	2016	Breakthrough Songwriter of the Year	—	Nominated	
APRA Music Awards	2017	Breakthrough Songwriter of the Year	—	Won	
APRA Music Awards	2017	Pop Work of the Year	"Youth"	Nominated	
APRA Music Awards	2024	Most Performed Dance/Electronic Work	"You Know What I Mean" (with PNAU)	Nominated	
APRA Music Awards	2024	Song of the Year	"Rush"	Won	
APRA Music Awards	2025	Most Performed Australian Work	"Got Me Started"	Nominated	
APRA Music Awards	2025	Most Performed Pop Work	"Got Me Started"	Nominated	
APRA Music Awards	2025	Song of the Year	"One of Your Girls"	Nominated	
APRA Music Awards	2025	Songwriter of the Year	—	Won	
Australian LGBTI Awards	2018	Music Artist	—	Nominated	
Australian Music Prize	2023	Australian Music Prize	Something to Give Each Other	Nominated	
Berlin Music Video Awards	2023	Best Experimental	"You Know What I Need" (with PNAU)	Nominated	
Behind the Camera Awards	2018	Original Song Award	"Revelation" (with Jónsi)	Won	
Billboard Music Awards	2022	Top Dance/Electronic Song	"You" (with Regard and Tate McRae)	Nominated	
Billboard Music Awards	2024	Top Dance/Electronic Album	Something to Give Each Other	Nominated	
BMI London Awards	2022	Award-Winning Song (Note: Awards and nominations Sivan has received as songwriter.)	"You" (with Regard and Tate McRae)	Won	
BreakTudo Awards	2018	Best Soundtrack Music	"Strawberries & Cigarettes"	Nominated	
BreakTudo Awards	2019	International Performance	Lollapalooza	Nominated	
BreakTudo Awards	2020	Artist on the Rise	—	Nominated	
BreakTudo Awards	2021	Global Artist	—	Nominated	
BreakTudo Awards	2023	International Music Video	"Rush"	Nominated	
British LGBT Awards	2017	Best Music Artist	—	Nominated	
British LGBT Awards	2018	Best Music Artist	—	Nominated	
British LGBT Awards	2019	Best Music Artist	—	Nominated	
Creative Impact Awards	2019	Creative Conscience Award	—	Won	
Electronic Dance Music Awards	2022	Dance / Electro Pop Song of the Year	"You"(with Regard and Tate McRae)	Nominated	
Gaffa Awards (Denmark)	2019	Best Foreign New Act	—	Nominated	
Gaffa Awards (Sweden)	2019	Best Foreign Song	"1999" (with Charli XCX)	Nominated	
GLAAD Media Awards	2016	Outstanding Music Artist	Blue Neighbourhood	Won	
GLAAD Media Awards	2017	Stephen F. Kolzak Award	—	Won	
GLAAD Media Awards	2019	Outstanding Music Artist	Bloom	Nominated	
GLAAD Media Awards	2024	Outstanding Music Artist	Something to Give Each Other	Nominated	
Golden Globe Awards	2019	Best Original Song	"Revelation" (with Jónsi)	Nominated	
GQ Australia Men of the Year Awards	2015	Breakthrough Male Solo Artist	—	Won	
GQ Australia Men of the Year Awards	2023	Man of the Year	—	Won	
Grammy Awards	2024	Best Music Video	"Rush"	Nominated	
Grammy Awards	2024	Best Dance Pop Recording	"Rush"	Nominated	
Grammy Awards	2025	Best Dance Pop Recording	"Got Me Started"	Nominated	
Hollywood Music in Media Awards	2018	Best Original Song – Feature Film	"Revelation" (with Jónsi)	Nominated	
iHeartRadio Music Awards	2016	Best Cover Song	"Hands to Myself" & "Sorry" (Note: Sivan received a nomination for a cover of Selena Gomez's song "Hands to Myself" & Justin Bieber's "Sorry".)	Nominated	
iHeartRadio Music Awards	2016	Biggest Triple Threat	—	Nominated	
iHeartRadio Music Awards	2022	Dance Song of the Year	"You" (with Regard and Tate McRae)	Nominated	
J Awards	2023	Australian Album of the Year	Something to Give Each Other	Nominated	
J Awards	2026	Australian Album of the Year	She's the Best	Nominated	
MTV Europe Music Awards	2015	Artist on the Rise	—	Won	
MTV Europe Music Awards	2016	Best Australian Act	—	Won	
MTV Europe Music Awards	2016	Best Worldwide Act	—	Won	
MTV Europe Music Awards	2023	Best Australian Act	—	Nominated	
MTV Europe Music Awards	2024	Best Australian Act	—	Nominated	
MTV Video Music Awards	2016	Breakthrough Long Form Video	Blue Neighbourhood trilogy	Nominated	
MTV Video Music Awards	2023	Song of Summer	"Rush"	Nominated	
MTV Video Music Awards	2024	Best Choreography	"Rush"	Nominated	
National Live Music Awards	2016	International Live Achievement (Solo)	—	Nominated	
NewNowNext Awards	2014	Best New Social Media Influencer (Male)	—	Won	
Nickelodeon Kids' Choice Awards	2015	Favourite Aussie/Kiwi Internet Sensation	—	Nominated	
Nickelodeon Kids' Choice Awards	2016	Favourite Social Media Star	—	Won	
Nickelodeon Kids' Choice Awards	2017	Favourite #Famous (Australia)	—	Nominated	
Nickelodeon Kids' Choice Awards	2019	Favorite Global Music Star	—	Nominated	
Nickelodeon Kids' Choice Awards	2024	Favorite Global Music Star	—	Nominated	
Queerty Awards	2018	Musician	—	Won	
Queerty Awards	2019	Anthem	"Bloom"	Nominated	
Queerty Awards	2021	Anthem	"Easy"	Nominated	
Queerty Awards	2022	Anthem	"Angel Baby"	Nominated	
Queerty Awards	2024	Anthem	"Rush"	Nominated	
Queerty Awards	2024	Music Video	One of Your Girls"	Won	
RTHK International Pop Poll Awards	2024	Top Male Singer	—	Nominated	
RTHK International Pop Poll Awards	2024	Top Ten International Gold Songs	"One of Your Girls"	Nominated	
Radio Disney Music Awards	2017	Best Crush Song	"Wild" (featuring Alessia Cara)	Nominated	
Rolling Stone Australia Awards	2021	Rolling Stone Global Award	—	Nominated	
Rolling Stone Australia Awards	2023	Rolling Stone Global Award	—	Nominated	
Rolling Stone Australia Awards	2024	Best Record	Something to Give Each Other	Nominated	
Rolling Stone Australia Awards	2024	Rolling Stone Global Award	—	Nominated	
Satellite Awards	2018	Best Original Song	"Revelation" (with Jónsi)	Nominated	
Satellite Awards	2018	Best Original Song	"Strawberries & Cigarettes"	Nominated	
Teen Choice Awards	2014	Choice Web: Collaboration	"The Boyfriend Tag" (with Tyler Oakley)	Won	
Teen Choice Awards	2014	Choice Web Star: Male	—	Nominated	
Teen Choice Awards	2016	Choice Breakout Artist	—	Nominated	
Teen Choice Awards	2016	Choice Music Single: Male	"Youth"	Nominated	
The AU Awards	2015	Best International Live Achievement – Solo Artist	—	Nominated	
The AU Awards	2018	Pop Artist of the Year	—	Won	
UK Music Video Awards	2023	Best Pop Video – International	"Rush"	Won	
UK Music Video Awards	2023	Best Styling in a Video	"Rush"	Nominated	
Video Prisma Awards	2023	Best Photography Direction – International	"Rush"	Nominated	
Video Prisma Awards	2023	Best Pop Video – International	"Rush"	Nominated	
Video Prisma Awards	2023	Best Pop Video – International (YouTube Music)	"Rush"	Won	
Video Prisma Awards	2023	Best Styling – International	"Rush"	Nominated	
West Australian Music Industry Awards	2015	Most Popular New Act	—	Nominated	
West Australian Music Industry Awards	2016	Best Pop Act	—	Nominated	
West Australian Music Industry Awards	2016	Most Popular Act	—	Nominated	
West Australian Music Industry Awards	2017	Most Popular Act	—	Nominated	
West Australian Music Industry Awards	2021	Best EP	In a Dream	Nominated	
YouTube Music Awards	2015	50 Artists to watch	—	Won	

== Acting awards ==
Year	Award	Category	Work	Result	Ref.
2011	South African Film and Television Awards	Best Actor – Feature Film	Spud	Nominated	
2020	CinEuphoria Awards	Best Ensemble – International Competition	Boy Erased	Nominated	(Note: Shared with cast)
2022	Logie Awards	Most Popular Australian Actor or Actress in an International Program	Three Months	Nominated	
