= List of Billboard number-one dance songs of 2021 =

Billboard magazine compiled the top-performing dance songs in the United States during 2021 on the Hot Dance/Electronic Songs and the Dance/Mix Show Airplay. First published as the Hot Dance Radio Airplay in 2003, the Dance/Mix Show Airplay ranked songs based on airplay detections on dance radio, as well as mix-show plays on top 40 radio and select rhythmic radio as measured by Mediabase. Premiered in 2013, the Hot Dance/Electronic Songs is a multi-metric chart ranking songs based on streaming, sales, and airplay audience impressions from radio stations of all formats.

== Chart history ==
Key
†	Indicates top-performing dance song of 2021.

Chart history
Issue date	Hot Dance/Electronic Songs			Dance/Mix Show Airplay		
Issue date	Song	Artist(s)	Ref.	Song	Artist(s)	Ref.
January 2	"ily (i love you baby)"	Surf Mesa featuring Emilee		"Nobody"	NOTD and Catello	
January 9	"ily (i love you baby)"	Surf Mesa featuring Emilee		"Nobody"	NOTD and Catello	
January 16	"ily (i love you baby)"	Surf Mesa featuring Emilee		"Nobody"	NOTD and Catello	
January 23	"ily (i love you baby)"	Surf Mesa featuring Emilee		"You Broke Me First"†	Tate McRae	
January 30	"ily (i love you baby)"	Surf Mesa featuring Emilee		"You Broke Me First"†	Tate McRae	
February 6	"ily (i love you baby)"	Surf Mesa featuring Emilee		"You Broke Me First"†	Tate McRae	
February 13	"Goosebumps"†	Travis Scott and Hvme		"You Broke Me First"†	Tate McRae	
February 20	"Goosebumps"†	Travis Scott and Hvme		"Goosebumps"	Travis Scott and Hvme	
February 27	"Goosebumps"†	Travis Scott and Hvme		"Goosebumps"	Travis Scott and Hvme	
March 6	"Goosebumps"†	Travis Scott and Hvme		"Lovelife"	Benny Benassi and Jeremih	
March 13	"Goosebumps"†	Travis Scott and Hvme		"Good Thing"	Lodato and Bright Sparks	
March 20	"Goosebumps"†	Travis Scott and Hvme		"New Love"	Silk City featuring Ellie Goulding	
March 27	"Goosebumps"†	Travis Scott and Hvme		"New Love"	Silk City featuring Ellie Goulding	
April 3	"Goosebumps"†	Travis Scott and Hvme		"Tell Me What You're Thinking"	Aviella	
April 10	"Goosebumps"†	Travis Scott and Hvme		"Underwater"	Anabel Englund and MK	
April 17	"Goosebumps"†	Travis Scott and Hvme		"Hearts On Fire"	Illenium, Dabin and Lights	
April 24	"Goosebumps"†	Travis Scott and Hvme		"Bed"	Joel Corry, Raye, and David Guetta	
May 1	"Goosebumps"†	Travis Scott and Hvme		"Bed"	Joel Corry, Raye, and David Guetta	
May 8	"Goosebumps"†	Travis Scott and Hvme		"Bed"	Joel Corry, Raye, and David Guetta	
May 15	"Goosebumps"†	Travis Scott and Hvme		"You"	Regard, Troye Sivan, and Tate McRae	
May 22	"Goosebumps"†	Travis Scott and Hvme		"You"	Regard, Troye Sivan, and Tate McRae	
May 29	"Goosebumps"†	Travis Scott and Hvme		"You"	Regard, Troye Sivan, and Tate McRae	
June 5	"Goosebumps"†	Travis Scott and Hvme		"You"	Regard, Troye Sivan, and Tate McRae	
June 12	"Goosebumps"†	Travis Scott and Hvme		"You"	Regard, Troye Sivan, and Tate McRae	
June 19	"Goosebumps"†	Travis Scott and Hvme		"You"	Regard, Troye Sivan, and Tate McRae	
June 26	"You"	Regard, Troye Sivan and Tate McRae		"You"	Regard, Troye Sivan, and Tate McRae	
July 3	"You"	Regard, Troye Sivan and Tate McRae		"You"	Regard, Troye Sivan, and Tate McRae	
July 10	"You"	Regard, Troye Sivan and Tate McRae		"You"	Regard, Troye Sivan, and Tate McRae	
July 17	"You"	Regard, Troye Sivan and Tate McRae		"You"	Regard, Troye Sivan, and Tate McRae	
July 24	"You"	Regard, Troye Sivan and Tate McRae		"You"	Regard, Troye Sivan, and Tate McRae	
July 31	"You"	Regard, Troye Sivan and Tate McRae		"Neon Lights"	Lodato	
August 7	"You"	Regard, Troye Sivan and Tate McRae		"Love Tonight"	SHouse	
August 14	"You"	Regard, Troye Sivan and Tate McRae		"Heartbreak Anthem"	Galantis, David Guetta and Little Mix	
August 21	"Pepas"	Farruko		"Love Tonight"	SHouse	
August 28	"Pepas"	Farruko		"Love Tonight"	SHouse	
September 4	"Pepas"	Farruko		"Mirror"	Sigrid	
September 11	"Pepas"	Farruko		"Bad Habits"	Ed Sheeran	
September 18	"Pepas"	Farruko		"Love Me Better"	Dillon Francis and Shift K3Y featuring Marc E. Bassy	
September 25	"Pepas"	Farruko		"If There is Love"	Laidback Luke featuring Ralphi	
October 2	"Pepas"	Farruko		"Always On My Mind"	Shane Codd featuring Charlotte Haining	
October 9	"Pepas"	Farruko		"I Wanna Be There"	DubVision and ANML KNGDM	
October 16	"Pepas"	Farruko		"Out Out"	Joel Corry, Jax Jones, Charli XCX, and Saweetie	
October 23	"Cold Heart"	Elton John and Dua Lipa		"Out Out"	Joel Corry, Jax Jones, Charli XCX, and Saweetie	
October 30	"Cold Heart"	Elton John and Dua Lipa		"Cold Heart"	Elton John and Dua Lipa	
November 6	"Cold Heart"	Elton John and Dua Lipa		"Cold Heart"	Elton John and Dua Lipa	
November 13	"Cold Heart"	Elton John and Dua Lipa		"Cold Heart"	Elton John and Dua Lipa	
November 20	"Cold Heart"	Elton John and Dua Lipa		"Cold Heart"	Elton John and Dua Lipa	
November 27	"Cold Heart"	Elton John and Dua Lipa		"Cold Heart"	Elton John and Dua Lipa	
December 4	"Cold Heart"	Elton John and Dua Lipa		"Cold Heart"	Elton John and Dua Lipa	
December 11	"Cold Heart"	Elton John and Dua Lipa		"Cold Heart"	Elton John and Dua Lipa	
December 18	"Cold Heart"	Elton John and Dua Lipa		"Cold Heart"	Elton John and Dua Lipa	
December 25	"Cold Heart"	Elton John and Dua Lipa		"Cold Heart"	Elton John and Dua Lipa	

== See also ==
- 2021 in American music
- List of Billboard Hot 100 number ones of 2021
