= Billboard Music Award for Top Dance/Electronic Song =

Annual American music award

This article lists the winners and nominees for the Billboard Music Award for Top Dance/Electronic Song. Eminent winners include LMFAO, MØ, Avicii, and Baauer.

== Winners and nominees ==
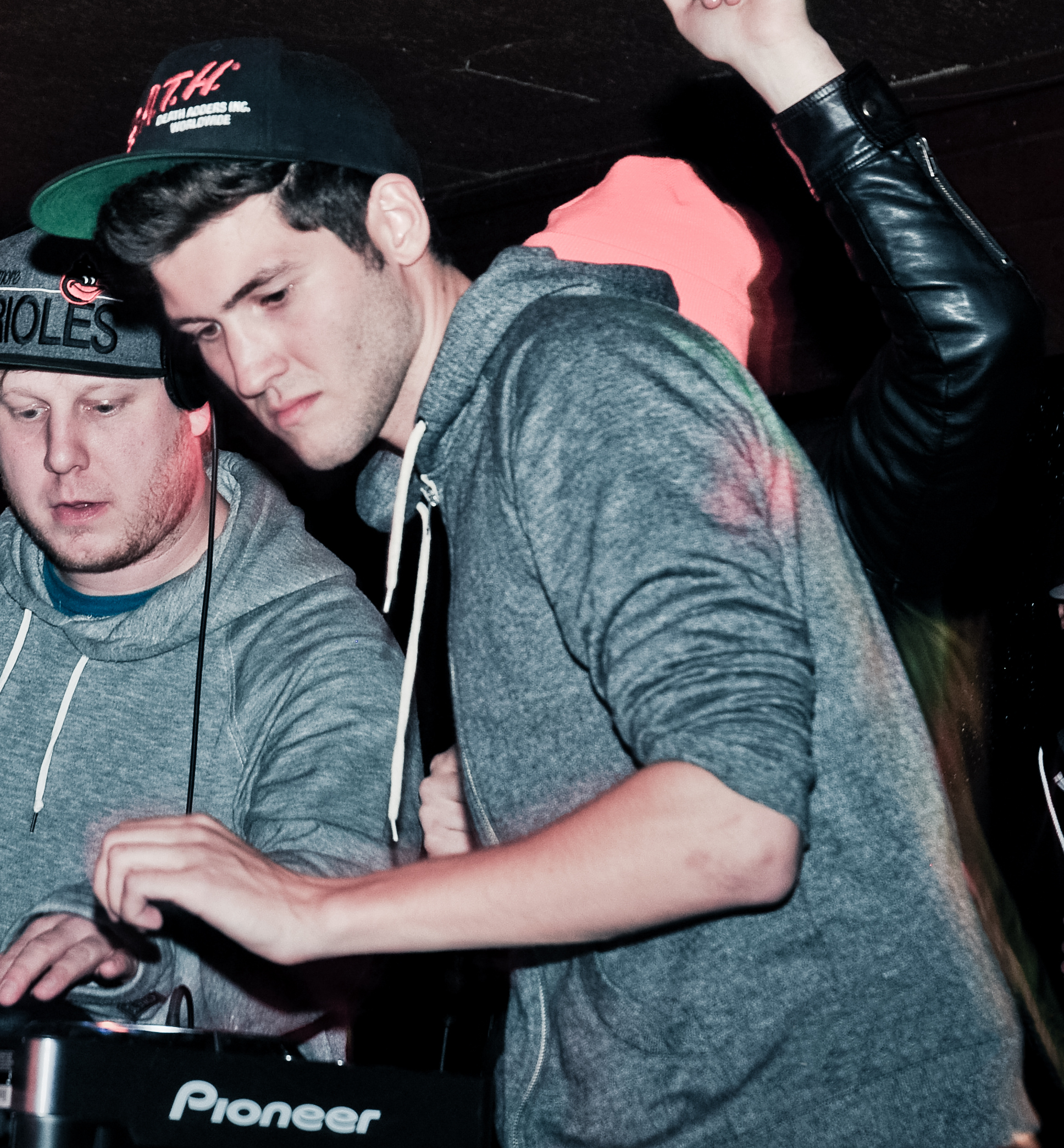
Two-time winner Baauer

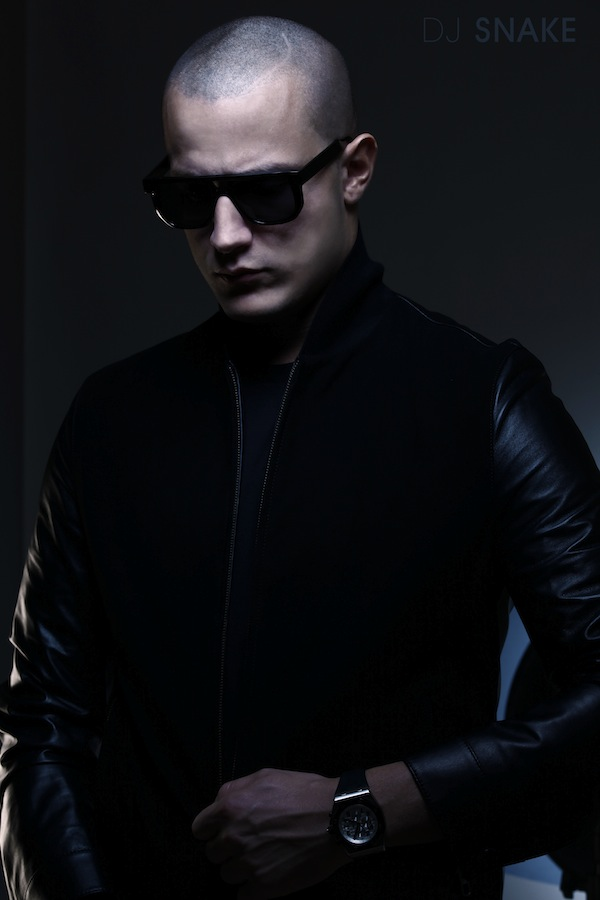
Two-time winner DJ Snake

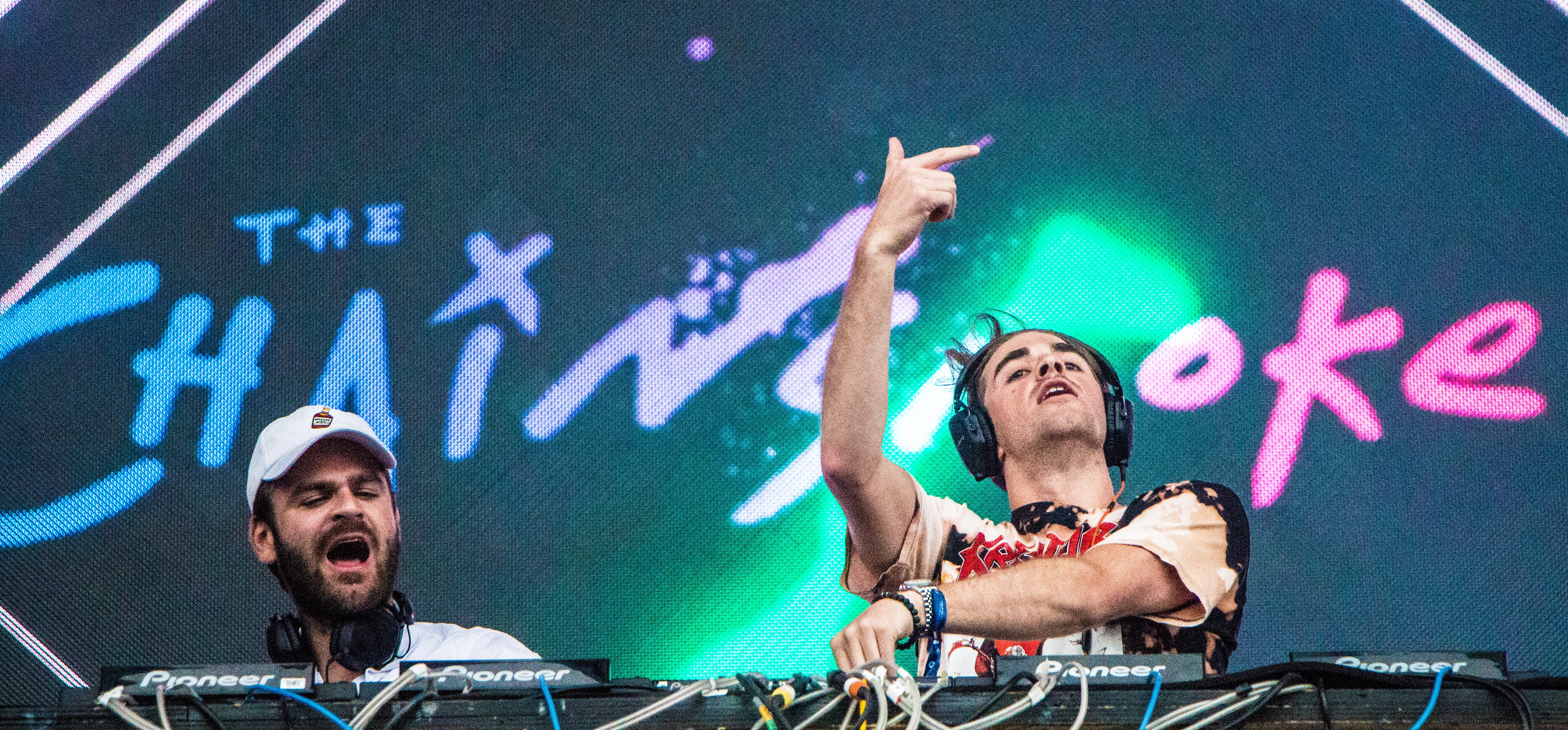
Two-time winner The Chainsmokers

2011 – 2013: Top Dance Song
2013 – 2013: Top Electric Song
2014 – present: Top Dance/Electronic Song

Year	Song	Artist	Nominee	R
2011	Stereo Love	Edward Maya feat. Vika Jigulina	"Bad Romance" - Lady Gaga; "Telephone" - Lady Gaga feat. Beyoncé; "Bulletproof" - La Roux; "We No Speak Americano" - Yolanda Be Cool and DCUP	
2012	Party Rock Anthem	LMFAO feat. Lauren Bennett and GoonRock	"In the Dark" - Dev; "Without You" - David Guetta feat. Usher; "Sexy and I Know It" - LMFAO; "Til the World Ends" - Britney Spears	
2013	Harlem Shake	Baauer	"Titanium" - David Guetta feat. Sia; "Starships" - Nicki Minaj; "Gangnam Style" - Psy; "Where Have You Been" - Rihanna	
2013	Harlem Shake	Baauer	"Feel So Close" - Calvin Harris; "Sweet Nothing" - Calvin Harris feat. Florence Welch; "Titanium" - David Guetta feat. Sia; "Don't You Worry Child" - Swedish House Mafia feat. John Martin	
2014	Wake Me Up!	Avicii	"Get Lucky" - Daft Punk feat. Pharrell Williams; "I Love It" - Icona Pop feat. Charli XCX; "Applause" - Lady Gaga; "Clarity" - Zedd feat. Clarity	
2015	Turn Down for What	DJ Snake and Lil Jon	"Rather Be" - Clean Bandit feat. Jess Glynne; "Latch" - Disclosure feat. Sam Smith; "Break Free" - Ariana Grande feat. Zedd; "Summer" - Calvin Harris	
2016	Lean On	Major Lazer and DJ Snake feat. MØ	"Roses" - The Chainsmokers feat. Rozes; "You Know You Like It" - DJ Snake and AlunaGeorge; "Hey Mama" - David Guetta feat. Nicki Minaj, Bebe Rexha, and Afrojack; "Where Are Ü Now" - Skrillex and Diplo feat. Justin Bieber	
2017	"Closer"	The Chainsmokers feat. Halsey	"Don't Let Me Down" - The Chainsmokers feat. Daya; This Is What You Came For" – Calvin Harris feat. Rihanna; "Cold Water" – Major Lazer feat. Justin Bieber & MØ; "Let Me Love You" – DJ Snake feat. Justin Bieber	
2018	"Something Just like This"	The Chainsmokers feat. Coldplay	"No Promises" - Cheat Codes feat. Demi Lovato; "Rockabye" – Clean Bandit feat. Sean Paul and Anne-Marie; "It Ain't Me" – Kygo & Selena Gomez; "Stay" - Zedd & Alessia Cara	
2019	"The Middle"	Zedd, Maren Morris and Grey	"Taki Taki" – DJ Snake feat. Selena Gomez, Ozuna and Cardi B; "One Kiss" – Calvin Harris and Dua Lipa; "Happier" – Marshmello and Bastille; "Jackie Chan" – Tiësto and Dzeko feat. Preme and Post Malone	
2020	"Close to Me"	Ellie Goulding x Diplo feat. Swae Lee	"Ritmo (Bad Boys for Life)" – Black Eyed Peas x J Balvin; "Good Things Fall Apart" – Illenium & Jon Bellion; "Higher Love" – Kygo x Whitney Houston; "Here with Me" – Marshmello feat. Chvrches	
2021	"Roses"	Saint Jhn	"Stupid Love" – Lady Gaga; "Rain on Me" – Lady Gaga and Ariana Grande; "ILY (I Love You Baby)" – Surf Mesa feat. Emilee; "Breaking Me" – Topic & A7S	
2022	"Cold Heart (Pnau remix)"	Elton John and Dua Lipa	"Pepas" – Farruko; "You" – Regard, Troye Sivan and Tate McRae; "Goosebumps" – Travis Scott & HVME; "The Business" – Tiësto	
2023	"I'm Good (Blue)"	David Guetta and Bebe Rexha	"Shakira: Bzrp Music Sessions, Vol. 53" – Bizarrap and Shakira; "Baby Don't Hurt Me" – David Guetta, Anne-Marie and Coi Leray; "Hold Me Closer" – Elton John and Britney Spears; "10:35" – Tiësto featuring Tate McRae	
2024	“Houdini”	Dua Lipa	"Illusion" – Dua Lipa; "Strangers" – Kenya Grace; "Yes, And?" – Ariana Grande; "Miles On It" – Marshmello & Kane Brown	

== Artists with multiple wins and nominations ==
2 wins

- The Chainsmokers
- DJ Snake
- Dua Lipa
6 nominations
- David Guetta

5 nominations

- Calvin Harris
- DJ Snake
- Lady Gaga

4 nominations

- The Chainsmokers
- Dua Lipa
- Tiësto
- Zedd

3 nominations

- Justin Bieber

2 nominations

- Anne-Marie
- Ariana Grande
- Baauer
- Bebe Rexha
- Britney Spears
- Clean Bandit
- Diplo
- Elton John
- Kygo
- LMFAO
- Marshmello
- Nicki Minaj
- Rihanna
- Selena Gomez
- Sia
- Tate McRae
