= Angel Baby (Troye Sivan song) =

- Original single cover

Single by Troye Sivan
- Released: 9 September 2021
- Genre: Synth-pop
- Length: 3:40
- Label: EMI; Universal; Capitol
- Songwriters: Troye Mellet; Sarah Hudson; James Abrahart; Jason Evigan; Michael Pollack
- Producer: Jason Evigan

Troye Sivan singles chronology
"Could Cry Just Thinkin About You" (2021)	"Angel Baby" (2021)	"Trouble" (2022)

Music video
- "Angel Baby" on YouTube

"Angel Baby" is a song by Australian singer-songwriter Troye Sivan. Released on 9 September 2021 via EMI, Universal and Capitol Records, "Angel Baby" was Sivan's first solo material since "Rager Teenager!" in August 2020. The song reached number one in Malaysia and the Philippines and reached the top 5 in Indonesia, Singapore, and Vietnam.

== Background ==
Sivan first announced the single on 27 August 2021 through social media posts, stating "surprise gushy juicy doting adoring power bottom gay ballad 'Angel Baby' out sept 10". It followed "You", a track by Regard which was released in April 2021, featured Sivan and Tate McRae, and reached number one on the US Dance Club Songs chart, becoming Sivan's third number one on a Billboard chart after "Youth" and "My My My!" topped the chart.

In the song's press release, Sivan explained that the song is his "crack at an adoring, doting, love struck, mega pop, gay, power ballad. I thought we needed a few more of those".

== Writing and composition ==
The song was written by Sivan, James Abrahart, Jason Evigan, Sarah Hudson and Michael Pollack. In an interview with Zach Sang, Sivan stated that he was sent the chorus of the song by Hudson who wrote it and that he wrote the verses and bridges around the chorus without changing it because he felt it was perfect. Lyrically, it features Sivan confessing to his lover that he has saved him, stating that he "almost died, but you're bringing me back to life". In the chorus he confesses that he wants to "stay in this moment forever" because he is "afraid living couldn't get any better", and that his lover has sacrificed a lot to be with him and "gave up heaven so we could be together", declaring him his "angel baby".

== Cover artwork ==
The official cover art for the single features a shirtless Sivan staring at the ground while wearing jeans and a white jockstrap. He is standing against a cloudy blue sky and has a small pair of neon angel wings on his back. Other promotional images released in the lead-up to the track's debut were similarly themed, including a black and white photograph of Sivan wearing tight silver leather trousers sitting on a fence with huge, feathery white wings and a black and white close-up of Sivan wearing a white top in the shower also being used to advertise the song.

== Music video ==
A visualiser featuring Sivan dancing around shirtless, wearing large angel wings and looking into the camera was released to accompany the song on 9 September 2021 and was directed by Lucas Chemotti. A music video for "Angel Baby" directed by Luke Gilford was released on 13 October, focusing on different couples in love. In some countries, such as United Arab Emirates, Saudi Arabia, Indonesia, and Malaysia, the video is blocked due to its LGBTQ+ inclusion; a geo-restricted "tunnel version" was released instead.

== Reception ==
Reviews of the track have praised the song's "yearning and romance" and described it as a "nostalgia-soaked love ballad", with "cinematic 90s synth glory".

== Charts ==
=== Weekly charts ===
Weekly chart performance for "Angel Baby"
Chart (2021–2022)	Peak position
Global 200 (Billboard)	156
Indonesia (Billboard)	2
Malaysia (RIM)	1
New Zealand Hot Singles (RMNZ)	19
Philippines (Billboard)	1
Singapore (RIAS)	2
South Korea (Gaon)	195
US Adult Pop Airplay (Billboard)	39
US Pop Airplay (Billboard)	39
Vietnam (Vietnam Hot 100)	4

=== Year-end charts ===
Year-end chart performance for "Angel Baby"
Chart (2022)	Position
Singapore (RIAS)	4
Vietnam (Vietnam Hot 100)	34

== Certifications ==
Region	Certification	Certified units/sales
Australia (ARIA)	Platinum	70,000^{‡}
New Zealand (RMNZ)	Gold	15,000^{‡}
^{‡} Sales+streaming figures based on certification alone.

== Release history ==
Release dates and formats for "Angel Baby"
Region	Date	Format(s)	Label	Ref.
Various	9 September 2021	Digital download; streaming	EMI; Universal	
United States	27 September 2021	Adult contemporary radio	Capitol	
United States	28 September 2021	Contemporary hit radio	Capitol	
