= Love Tonight =

2017 single by Shouse

Single by Shouse

from the album Collective Ecstasy
- Released: 14 December 2017
- Recorded: 2016
- Genre: House
- Length: 8:13; 4:01 (edit)
- Label: Hell Beach
- Songwriters: Jack Madin; Ed Service
- Producer: Shouse

Shouse singles chronology
"Text Apology" (2017)	"Love Tonight" (2017)	"Won't Forget You" (2022)

Music video
- "Love Tonight" on YouTube

"Love Tonight" is a song by Australian-New Zealand electronic music duo Shouse, released on 14 December 2017, through Australian label Hell Beach, a sub-label of Onelove Recordings Australia, who also marketed the record independently. The song was mixed by Matthew "Horse" Hadley, with additional mixing and mastering by Cass Irvine and Kevin Grainger at Wired Studios London. "Love Tonight" rose to prominence in 2021, becoming a sleeper hit, after several remixes were released.

At the AIR Awards of 2022, the song won Best Independent Dance, Electronica or Club Single.

== Background and composition ==
Shouse recorded "Love Tonight" in early 2016 at a warehouse in Brunswick, Victoria. It was the first track the duo created together and came about during a jam session. They reworked the song several times before having the idea of including a choir, although some components remained the same, namely the bassline, and the flute melody that was created with a MIDI controller. It was mixed by Matthew Hadley.

A house song, "Love Tonight" is composed in the key of C minor with a tempo of 123 beats per minute. It features saxophone played by Tony Barnao and a chorus sung by a choir consisting of the two Shouse members and 18 friends gathered by them, all of whom are amateur singers and Melbourne underground artists. The inclusion of the choir was intended as both a parody and an homage to 1980s Band Aid and the 1985 song "We Are the World". The choir includes eight lead singers: Bec Rigby, Oscar Slorach-Thorne, Christobel Elliott, Tony Barna, Maia, Daisy Catterall, Monte Morgan, and Mohini. According to Ed Service from the duo, the song is about unity, togetherness and community. Member Jack Madin, the writer of the lyrics, explained that it is about "the love of your friends" and "for all the people in Melbourne that make [Shouse] want to make music."

== Release and promotion ==
"Love Tonight" was premiered online by British bimonthly magazine i-D on 21 November 2017. An accompanying music video directed by James J. Robinson was released on YouTube the previous day. The video embodies a lo-fi photography aesthetic with making of montages from personal studio recordings. A portion of the budget and proceeds made from the song were donated to the Domestic Violence Resource Centre Victoria. The single was released to digital and streaming services on 14 December 2017, through Australian label Hell Beach, a sub label of Onelove. To promote the release, Shouse held release shows in Melbourne and played at the Gaytimes Festival in Victoria.

== Commercial performance ==
"Love Tonight" first charted in August 2019 in Lithuania where it peaked at number 15 on the AGATA Singles Chart, a week after debuting at number 31. In July 2021, the song appeared on several other charts following the release of the David Guetta remix and a rise in popularity on TikTok. It entered the US Hot Dance/Electronic Songs chart at number 20 with a total of 582,000 streams in its first charting week. The following month, it topped the US Dance/Mix Show Airplay chart, receiving its core support from electronic dance music channel BPM, San Francisco radio station KMVQ-HD2 and Music Choice's dance channel. The song became Shouse's first top 10 entry on Hot Dance/Electronic Songs, registering 2 million streams and 1,100 download sales during the week of its climb from number 11 to number 9. It peaked at number eight the following week.

"Love Tonight" debuted at number 71 on the UK Singles Chart in August 2021 with first-week sales of 5,692 units, and peaked at number 18 two months later with sales of 16,379 units. According to Music Week, the David Guetta remix accounted for 65% of its sales during the single's surge of popularity in the UK. The track received a platinum certification from the British Phonographic Industry (BPI), which denotes track-equivalent sales of 600,000 units. In Australia, "Love Tonight" peaked at number 22 in its ninth week on the ARIA Singles Chart. It was certified 5× platinum by the Australian Recording Industry Association (ARIA) for track-equivalent sales of 350,000 units. The song also reached the top 10 in numerous countries throughout Europe, charting in the top five in Austria, Belgium, Bulgaria, Germany, Greece, the Netherlands, Russia, Switzerland, and Ukraine. On the Billboard Global 200 chart, "Love Tonight" peaked at number 20.

== Track listings ==
- Digital download and streaming
1. "Love Tonight" – 8:13
2. "Love Tonight" (edit) – 4:01
- Digital download and streaming – remixes
1. "Love Tonight" (Mike Simonetti remix) – 6:00
2. "Love Tonight" (DJ Seinfeld remix) – 6:30
3. "Love Tonight" (The Nights remix) – 7:20
- Limited edition 12-inch vinyl
1. "Love Tonight" – 8:13
2. "Love Tonight" (a cappella) – 3:00
3. "Love Tonight" (Mike Simonetti remix) – 6:00
4. "Love Tonight" (DJ Seinfeld remix) – 6:30
- Digital download and streaming – Oliver Huntemann remix
1. "Love Tonight" (Oliver Huntemann remix) – 6:55
2. "Love Tonight" (Oliver Huntemann dub) – 6:56
3. "Love Tonight" (Oliver Huntemann remix edit) – 3:25
- Digital download and streaming – Vintage Culture and Kiko Franco remix
1. "Love Tonight" (Vintage Culture and Kiko Franco remix) – 6:26
2. "Love Tonight" (Vintage Culture and Kiko Franco remix edit) – 3:28
- 12-inch vinyl
1. "Love Tonight" – 8:13
2. "Love Tonight" (Mike Simonetti remix) – 6:00
3. "Love Tonight" (Oliver Huntemann remix) – 6:55
4. "Love Tonight" (DJ Seinfeld remix) – 6:30
- Digital download and streaming – David Guetta remix
1. "Love Tonight" (David Guetta remix edit) – 2:38
2. "Love Tonight" (David Guetta remix) – 3:00
3. "Love Tonight" (edit) – 4:01
- Digital download and streaming – Robin Schulz remix
1. "Love Tonight" (Robin Schulz remix) – 3:04
2. "Love Tonight" (edit) – 4:01
- Digital download and streaming – Franky Wah remix
1. "Love Tonight" (Franky Wah remix) – 3:52
2. "Love Tonight" (edit) – 4:01

== Charts ==
=== Weekly charts ===
Weekly chart performance for "Love Tonight"
Chart (2021–2024)	Peak position
Australia (ARIA)	22
Australia Dance (ARIA)	3
Austria (Ö3 Austria Top 40)	3
Belarus Airplay (TopHit)	59
Belgium (Ultratop 50 Flanders)	1
Belgium (Ultratop 50 Wallonia)	3
Bulgaria Airplay (PROPHON)	5
Canada (Canadian Hot 100)	61
CIS Airplay (TopHit)	3
Croatia International Airplay (Top lista)	10
Czech Republic Airplay (ČNS IFPI)	14
Czech Republic Singles Digital (ČNS IFPI)	9
Denmark (Tracklisten)	38
Estonia Airplay (TopHit)	55
France (SNEP)	8
Germany (GfK)	4
Global 200 (Billboard)	20
Greece International (IFPI)	2
Hungary (Dance Top 40)	3
Hungary (Rádiós Top 40)	9
Hungary (Single Top 40)	3
Hungary (Stream Top 40)	6
Iceland (Tónlistinn)	20
Ireland (IRMA)	12
Italy (FIMI)	37
Lithuania (AGATA)	15
Luxembourg (Billboard)	21
Moldova Airplay (TopHit)	29
Netherlands (Dutch Top 40)	5
Netherlands (Single Top 100)	2
New Zealand Hot Singles (RMNZ)	12
Norway (VG-lista)	38
Poland Airplay (ZPAV)	27
Poland Airplay (ZPAV) Robin Schulz Remix	12
Portugal (AFP)	14
Romania Airplay (UPFR)	8
Russia Airplay (TopHit)	2
San Marino Airplay (SMRTV Top 50)	7
Slovakia Airplay (ČNS IFPI)	1
Slovakia Singles Digital (ČNS IFPI)	7
South Africa Streaming (TOSAC)	46
Spain (Promusicae)	69
Sweden (Sverigetopplistan)	34
Switzerland (Schweizer Hitparade)	2
Ukraine Airplay (TopHit)	8
UK Singles (Official Charts)	18
UK Dance (Official Charts)	5
UK Independent (Official Charts)	1
US Hot Dance/Electronic Songs (Billboard)	8

=== Monthly charts ===
Monthly chart performance for "Love Tonight"
Chart (2021–2023)	Peak position
Belarus Airplay (TopHit)	61
CIS Airplay (TopHit)	4
Czech Republic (Rádio – Top 100)	30
Czech Republic (Singles Digitál Top 100)	8
Estonia Airplay (TopHit)	57
Lithuania Airplay (TopHit)	51
Moldova Airplay (TopHit)	34
Romania Airplay (TopHit)	81
Russia Airplay (TopHit)	4
Slovakia (Rádio – Top 100)	1
Slovakia (Singles Digitál Top 100)	9
Ukraine Airplay (TopHit)	15

=== Year-end charts ===
2021 year-end chart performance for "Love Tonight"
Chart (2021)	Position
Australia Dance (ARIA)	14
Austria (Ö3 Austria Top 40)	10
Belgium (Ultratop Flanders)	5
Belgium (Ultratop Wallonia)	14
CIS Airplay (TopHit)	26
France (SNEP)	35
Germany (Official German Charts)	7
Global 200 (Billboard)	120
Hungary (Dance Top 40)	28
Hungary (Single Top 40)	12
Hungary (Stream Top 40)	27
Italy (FIMI)	81
Netherlands (Dutch Top 40)	35
Netherlands (Single Top 100)	6
Portugal (AFP)	46
Russia Airplay (TopHit)	29
Switzerland (Schweizer Hitparade)	8
Ukraine Airplay (TopHit)	100
UK Indie (OCC)	8
US Hot Dance/Electronic Songs (Billboard)	17

2022 year-end chart performance for "Love Tonight"
Chart (2022)	Position
Australia (ARIA)	67
Austria (Ö3 Austria Top 40)	21
Belgium (Ultratop 50 Flanders)	45
Belgium (Ultratop 50 Wallonia)	58
CIS Airplay (TopHit)	31
Germany (Official German Charts)	26
Global 200 (Billboard)	83
Hungary (Dance Top 40)	16
Hungary (Single Top 40)	94
Netherlands (Single Top 100)	40
Russia Airplay (TopHit)	53
Switzerland (Schweizer Hitparade)	15
Ukraine Airplay (TopHit)	73
US Hot Dance/Electronic Songs (Billboard)	77

2023 year-end chart performance for "Love Tonight"
Chart (2023)	Position
Belarus Airplay (TopHit)	91
CIS Airplay (TopHit)	108
Moldova Airplay (TopHit)	80
Romania Airplay (TopHit)	134
Ukraine Airplay (TopHit)	54

2024 year-end chart performance for "Love Tonight"
Chart (2024)	Peak position
Belarus Airplay (TopHit)	189
Estonia Airplay (TopHit)	76
Hungary (Rádiós Top 40)	53

2025 year-end chart performance for "Love Tonight"
Chart (2025)	Peak position
Belarus Airplay (TopHit)	176
Hungary (Rádiós Top 40)	77

== Certifications ==
Certifications for "Love Tonight"
Region	Certification	Certified units/sales
Australia (ARIA)	5× Platinum	350,000^{‡}
Belgium (BRMA)	2× Platinum	80,000^{‡}
Brazil (Pro-Música Brasil) (Vintage Culture & Kiko Franco Remix Edit)	Diamond	160,000^{‡}
Denmark (IFPI Danmark)	Platinum	90,000^{‡}
France (SNEP)	Diamond	333,333^{‡}
Germany (BVMI)	2× Platinum	800,000^{‡}
Italy (FIMI)	2× Platinum	200,000^{‡}
New Zealand (RMNZ)	2× Platinum	60,000^{‡}
Poland (ZPAV)	Platinum	125,000^{‡}
Portugal (AFP)	3× Platinum	30,000^{‡}
Spain (Promusicae)	Platinum	60,000^{‡}
Spain (Promusicae) (David Guetta Remix)	Gold	30,000^{‡}
United Kingdom (BPI)	Platinum	600,000^{‡}
United States (RIAA)	Platinum	1,000,000^{‡}
Streaming
Greece (IFPI Greece)	Platinum	2,000,000^{†}
^{‡} Sales+streaming figures based on certification alone.^{†} Streaming-only figures based on certification alone.

== Release history ==
Release dates and formats for "Love Tonight"
Region	Date	Format(s)	Version	Label	Ref.
Various	14 December 2017	Digital download; streaming	Original	Hell Beach	
Various	14 December 2017	Digital download; streaming	Remixes	Hell Beach	
Various	8 February 2018	12-inch vinyl	Limited edition	Hell Beach	
Various	12 March 2021	Digital download; streaming	Oliver Huntemann remix	Hell Beach	
Various	26 March 2021	Digital download; streaming	Vintage Culture and Kiko Franco remix	Hell Beach	
Various	29 March 2021	12-inch vinyl	Remixes	Hell Beach	
Various	11 June 2021	Digital download; streaming	David Guetta remix	Hell Beach	
Various	3 September 2021	Digital download; streaming	Robin Schulz remix	Hell Beach	
Various	10 December 2021	Digital download; streaming	Franky Wah remix	Hell Beach	

== See also ==
- List of Billboard number-one dance songs of 2021
