= Never Let You Go (Jason Derulo and Shouse song) =

2022 single by Jason Derulo and Shouse

Single by Jason Derulo and Shouse
- Released: November 4, 2022
- Length: 2:58
- Label: Hell Beach; Onelove
- Songwriter(s): Ed Service; Jack Madin; Jason Desrouleaux; Sean Kenihan
- Producer(s): Saltwives

Jason Derulo singles chronology
"No No No" (2022)	"Never Let You Go" (2022)	"Saturday/Sunday" (2023)

Shouse singles chronology
"Won't Forget You" (2022)	"Never Let You Go" (2022)	"Live Without Love" (2023)

"Never Let You Go" is a song by American singer Jason Derulo and Australian-New Zealand electronic music duo Shouse, released on November 4, 2022.

At the APRA Music Awards of 2024, the song won Most Performed Dance/Electronic Work.

== Background and release ==
In October 2022, Shouse announced the song via their Facebook page, saying "Never thought that the legend Jason Derulo hearing our music in Ibiza would lead to a collaboration like this... but love what he's done!"

Derulo said "I'm extremely excited to present my latest project 'Never Let You Go' to my fans all around the globe. It was such a fun experience working with Shouse and I can't wait for everyone to start vibing to it." The song sample's Shouse's previous single "Won't Forget You".

== Reception ==
Kat Bein from Billboard said "This new one from Jason Derulo and Shouse taps a bit into that epic feeling, but with a modern and tempered R&B twist." Bein concluded saying "Let this one play loud when you've got to dance yourself clean of a heartbreak, or are just looking to let loose from Friday to Sunday."

== Charts ==
Chart performance for "Never Let You Go"
Chart (2022–2023)	Peak position
New Zealand Hot Singles (RMNZ)	26
Turkey (Radiomonitor Türkiye)	2
