= Take Yourself Home =

2020 synth-pop song by Troye Sivan

Single by Troye Sivan

from the EP In a Dream
- Released: 1 April 2020
- Genre: Synth-pop; electropop; electronic dance
- Length: 4:09
- Label: EMI Australia; Capitol
- Songwriters: Troye Mellet; Brett McLaughlin; Taylor Parks; Oscar Görres
- Producer: OzGo

Troye Sivan singles chronology
"Love Me Wrong" (2019)	"Take Yourself Home" (2020)	"Easy" (2020)

Lyric video
- "Take Yourself Home" on YouTube

"Take Yourself Home" is a song by Australian singer-songwriter Troye Sivan. The song was released via EMI Music Australia on 1 April 2020 as the lead single from his fifth EP In a Dream (2020).

== Reception ==
Paper stated that it "is perhaps the first great song to come out of our collective apocalyptic state of mind during the COVID-19 outbreak." Critics also praised the dance coda in the song.

== Charts ==
Chart performance of "Take Yourself Home"
Chart (2020)	Peak position
Australia (ARIA)	91
New Zealand Hot Singles (RMNZ)	9

== Release history ==
Region	Date	Format	Label(s)	Ref.
Various	1 April 2020	Digital download; streaming	EMI	
Australia	3 April 2020	Contemporary hit radio	EMI	
