= Oscar Görres =

Swedish record producer, songwriter, and musician

- Born: Oscar Michael Görres; 20 March 1986 (age 40); Stockholm, Sweden
- Genres: Pop; dance; R&B; rock
- Occupations: Record producer; songwriter; musician
- Years active: 2007–present

Oscar Michael Görres (born 20 March 1986), also known as OzGo, is a Swedish record producer, songwriter, and musician. He is best known for writing and producing songs with the likes of MARINA, Taylor Swift, 5 Seconds of Summer, Troye Sivan, Maroon 5, DNCE, Britney Spears, Tove Lo and Pink. Görres is a part of Max Martin's production team, Wolf Cousins.

== Career ==
Görres was signed to music publisher Warner Chappell Music when he was nineteen.

== Production discography ==
Title	Year	Artist(s)	Album	Co-writer	Producer or Co-producer
"Hey (I've Been Feeling Kind of Lonely)"	2007	Danny Saucedo	Heart Beats	check	check
"Blue"	2007	Danny Saucedo	Heart Beats	check	check
"Running Away"	2008	Danny Saucedo	Set Your Body Free	check	check
"Turn Off The Sound"	2008	Danny Saucedo	Set Your Body Free	check	check
"Baby Goodbye"	2008	E.M.D.	A State of Mind	check	check
"For You"	2008	E.M.D.	A State of Mind	check	check
"Give Me Some Time"	2008	E.M.D.	A State of Mind	check	check
"Hit'n'Run"	2008	Monrose	I Am	X mark	check
"Sufrirás" (featuring Pixie Lott)	2009	David Bisbal	Sin Mirar Atrás	check	check
"Unstoppable (The Return of Natalie)"	2010	Ola Svensson	Ola	X mark	check
"From Brazil with Love"	2010	Alcazar	Disco Defenders	check	check
"Ase me"	2010	Eleni Foureira	Eleni Foureira	X mark	check
"There's a Place for Us"	2010	E.M.D.	Rewind	X mark	check
"No More Tears On The Dancefloor"	2011	Anders & Fahrenkrog	Two	X mark	check
"Mr. Moon"	2011	Anders & Fahrenkrog	Two	X mark	check
"Why Do You Cry"	2011	Anders & Fahrenkrog	Two	X mark	check
"Army of Love"	2011	Anders & Fahrenkrog	Two	X mark	check
"Finally Free"	2011	Kimberley Locke	Four for the Floor	check	X mark
"In Your Eyes"	2011	Danny Saucedo	In the Club	X mark	check
"Catch Me If You Can"	2011	Danny Saucedo	In the Club	check	check
"Glorious"	2011	Linda Pritchard	Alive	check	check
"Miracle"	2011	Linda Pritchard	Alive	check	check
"Alive"	2011	Linda Pritchard	Alive	check	check
"Not Even Hello"	2011	Linda Pritchard	Alive	check	check
"Dance Your Tears Away"	2011	Linda Pritchard	Alive	check	check
"Erase & Rewind"	2011	Linda Pritchard	Alive	check	check
"Rise Again"	2011	Linda Pritchard	Alive	check	check
"Alienized"	2011	Linda Pritchard	Alive	check	X mark
"Satellite"	2011	Linda Pritchard	Alive	check	check
"Crying in the Rain"	2011	Linda Pritchard	Alive	check	check
"Stuck in a Riddle"	2011	Linda Pritchard	Alive	check	check
"On Time"	2011	Linda Pritchard	Alive	check	check
"Can't Hold Back"	2013	Anton Ewald	A	check	check
"Feelings"	2014	Maroon 5	V	check	check
"I Wish" (featuring T.I.)	2014	Cher Lloyd	Sorry I'm Late	check	check
"Just Like That"	2014	Mohombi	Universe	check	check
"Save Me"	2014	Mohombi	Universe	check	check
"Grow Old with You"	2014	Mohombi	Universe	check	check
"Unbreakable Smile"	2015	Tori Kelly	Unbreakable Smile	X mark	check
"Rumors" (featuring Tove Lo)	2015	Adam Lambert	The Original High	check	check
"Jinx"	2015	DNCE	Swaay	check	check
"One in a Million"	2015	Hilary Duff	Breathe In. Breathe Out.	check	check
"Comeback"	2015	Ella Eyre	Feline	check	check
"Flashes"	2016	Tove Lo	Lady Wood	check	check
"Hard to Forget Ya"	2016	Britney Spears	Glory	check	check
"Doctor You"	2016	DNCE	DNCE	check	check
"Blown" (featuring Kent Jones)	2016	DNCE	DNCE	check	check
"Naked"	2016	DNCE	DNCE	X mark	check
"Be Mean"	2016	DNCE	DNCE	check	check
"Denim Jacket"	2017	Maroon 5	Red Pill Blues	check	check
"Plastic Rose"	2017	Maroon 5	Red Pill Blues	check	check
"No Man Is an Island"	2017	The Script	Freedom Child	X mark	check
"Deliverance"	2017	The Script	Freedom Child	check	check
"So It Goes..."	2017	Taylor Swift	Reputation	check	check
"Words"	2017	Jasmine Thompson	Wonderland EP	check	check
"My My My!"	2018	Troye Sivan	Bloom	check	check
"Plum"	2018	Troye Sivan	Bloom	check	check
"What I Miss Most"	2018	Calum Scott	Only Human	check	check
"Time Is Not on Our Side"	2018	The Vamps	Night & Day	check	check
"Bad Time"	2018	Sabrina Carpenter	Singular: Act 1	check	check
"Closer"	2018	Astrid S	Non-album single	check	check
"i'm so tired..."	2019	Lauv and Troye Sivan	How I'm Feeling	check	check
"Orange Trees"	2019	MARINA	Love + Fear	check	check
"Enjoy Your Life"	2019	MARINA	Love + Fear	X mark	check
"True"	2019	MARINA	Love + Fear	check	check
"Believe in Love"	2019	MARINA	Love + Fear	check	check
"Happy"	2019	Pink	Hurts 2B Human	X mark	check
"Cruel"	2019	Glowie	Where I Belong	check	check
"Lips Don't Lie" (featuring A Boogie wit da Hoodie)	2019	Ally Brooke	TBA	check	check
"Fresh Laundry"	2019	Allie X	Cape God	check	check
"Rings a Bell"	2019	Allie X	Cape God	check	check
"Regulars"	2019	Allie X	Cape God	check	check
"Love Me Wrong"	2019	Allie X and Troye Sivan	Cape God	check	check
"Devil I Know"	2020	Allie X	Cape God	check	check
"Sarah Come Home"	2020	Allie X	Cape God	X mark	check
"June Gloom"	2020	Allie X	Cape God	check	check
"Super Duper Party People"	2020	Allie X	Cape God	check	check
"Susie Save Your Love"	2020	Allie X and Mitski	Cape God	check	check
"Life of the Party"	2020	Allie X	Cape God	check	check
"Madame X"	2020	Allie X	Cape God	check	check
"Learning in Public"	2020	Allie X	Cape God	check	check
"Wildflower"	2020	5 Seconds of Summer	Calm	check	check
"Take Yourself Home"	2020	Troye Sivan	In a Dream	check	check
"Stud"	2020	Troye Sivan	In a Dream	check	check
"Rager Teenager!"	2020	Troye Sivan	In a Dream	check	check
"In a Dream"	2020	Troye Sivan	In a Dream	check	check
"Easy"	2020	Troye Sivan	In a Dream	check	check
"Slow Grenade" (featuring Lauv)	2020	Ellie Goulding	Brightest Blue	check	X mark
"Teary Eyes"	2020	Katy Perry	Smile	X mark	check
"Not the End of the World"	2020	Katy Perry	Smile	X mark	check
"Diamonds"	2020	Sam Smith	Love Goes	check	check
"California Palms"	2021	Maty Noyes	The Feeling's Mutual	check	check
"Good Mood"	2021	Adam Levine	PAW Patrol: The Movie (Music from the Motion Picture)	check	check
"2 Die 4"	2022	Tove Lo	Dirt Femme	check	check
"I Love Your Girl"	2022	Mabel	About Last Night...	check	check
"Lost the Breakup"	2023	Maisie Peters	The Good Witch	check	check
"Watch"	2023	Maisie Peters	The Good Witch	check	check
"I Got It Bad"	2023	Addison Rae	AR	check	check
"A Beautiful Game"	2023	Ed Sheeran	Non-album single	X mark	check
"Tell Mama"	2023	Alma	Time Machine	check	check
"I Will Survive"	2023	Alma	Time Machine	check	check
"What's the Time Where You Are?"	2023	Troye Sivan	Something to Give Each Other	check	check
"One of Your Girls"	2023	Troye Sivan	Something to Give Each Other	check	check
"In My Room" (featuring Guitarricadelafuente)	2023	Troye Sivan	Something to Give Each Other	check	check
"Still Got It"	2023	Troye Sivan	Something to Give Each Other	check	check
"Can't Go Back, Baby"	2023	Troye Sivan	Something to Give Each Other	check	check
"Honey"	2023	Troye Sivan	Something to Give Each Other	check	check
"How to Stay with You"	2023	Troye Sivan	Something to Give Each Other	check	check
"Supernatural"	2024	Ariana Grande	Eternal Sunshine	check	check
"King Size Bed"	2024	Alec Benjamin	12 Notes	check	check
"Si no no"	2024	Danny Ocean	Reflexa	check	check
"Todas Las Estrellas"	2024	Tiago PZK	Gotti A	X mark	check
"Tony"	2024	Tiago PZK	Gotti A	X mark	check
"Look How Far You've Come"	2024	Joshua Bassett	The Golden Years	check	X mark
"Jackpot"	2024	Belinda and Kenia Os	Indómita	check	check
"Warm"	2025	Ariana Grande	Eternal Sunshine Deluxe: Brighter Days Ahead	check	check
"Chemical Reaction"	2025	Debbii Dawson	TBA	check	check
"Plastic Box"	2025	Jade	That's Showbiz Baby	check	check
"Stay (If You Wanna Dance)"	2025	Myles Smith	My Mess, My Heart, My Life.	check	check
"nah"	2025	Khalid	after the sun goes down	check	check
"tank top"	2025	Khalid	after the sun goes down	check	check
"whenever you're gone"	2025	Khalid	after the sun goes down	check	check
"instant"	2025	Khalid	after the sun goes down	check	check
