= Won't Forget You =

2022 single by Shouse

Single by Shouse

from the album Collective Ecstasy
- Released: 4 February 2022
- Length: 6:38
- Label: Hell Beach; Onelove
- Songwriters: Ed Service; Jack Madin
- Producers: Shouse; Sean Kenihan

Shouse singles chronology
"Love Tonight" (2017)	"Won't Forget You" (2022)	"Never Let You Go" (2022)

Music video
- "Won't Forget You" on YouTube

"Won't Forget You" is a song by Australian-New Zealand electronic music duo Shouse, released on 4 February 2022, through Australian label Hell Beach, a sub label of Onelove Recordings Australia.

== Background and release ==
"Won't Forget You" was recorded between trips to Europe and a live appearance at the Sydney Opera House on New Year's Eve and with a choir of over 50 friends and colleagues.

The duo said, "'Won't Forget You' is a song about friendship and love, on the connections that last forever. We have all endured a period of disconnection, but we never forget the people who are so important to us. This song is for your best friends, for the family that lives far, for the new friend met in the disco. It's the song that reminds us of what we love. It's a song to sing together."

"Won't Forget You" was the basis for Jason DeRulo's collaboration with Shouse, "Never Let You Go".

== Track listings ==
Digital download

1. "Won't Forget You" – 6:38
2. "Won't Forget You" (Edit) – 3:50
- Digital download and streaming
1. "Won't Forget You" (Kungs remix edit) – 2:53
2. "Won't Forget You" (Felix Jaehn remix edit) – 3:04
3. "Won't Forget You" (Eli & Fur remix) – 7:11
4. "Won't Forget You" (Edit) – 3:50

== Charts ==
=== Weekly charts ===
2022 weekly chart performance for "Won't Forget You"
Chart (2022)	Peak position
Bulgaria Airplay (PROPHON)	4
CIS Airplay (TopHit)	1
Germany (GfK)	36
Greece International (IFPI)	8
Hungary (Rádiós Top 40)	1
Hungary (Dance Top 40)	3
Hungary (Single Top 40)	2
Lithuania (AGATA)	15
Netherlands (Single Tip)	2
Poland Airplay (ZPAV)	2
Romania Airplay (UPFR)	5
Russia Airplay (TopHit)	3
Slovakia Airplay (ČNS IFPI)	44
Slovakia Singles Digital (ČNS IFPI)	67
Switzerland (Schweizer Hitparade)	91
Ukraine Airplay (TopHit)	1

2023 weekly chart performance for "Won't Forget You"
Chart (2023)	Peak position
Belarus Airplay (TopHit)	41
CIS Airplay (TopHit)	35
Kazakhstan Airplay (TopHit)	90
Lithuania Airplay (TopHit)	88
Moldova Airplay (TopHit)	3
Romania Airplay (TopHit)	56
Russia Airplay (TopHit)	53
Ukraine Airplay (TopHit)	2

2024 weekly chart performance for "Won't Forget You"
Chart (2024)	Peak position
Belarus Airplay (TopHit)	73
CIS Airplay (TopHit)	55
Lithuania Airplay (TopHit)	75
Moldova Airplay (TopHit)	42
Romania Airplay (TopHit)	86
Russia Airplay (TopHit)	63
Ukraine Airplay (TopHit)	43

2025 weekly chart performance for "Won't Forget You"
Chart (2025)	Peak position
Belarus Airplay (TopHit)	65
CIS Airplay (TopHit)	196
Kazakhstan Airplay (TopHit)	141
Lithuania Airplay (TopHit)	142
Moldova Airplay (TopHit)	28
Romania Airplay (TopHit)	88
Ukraine Airplay (TopHit)	110

2026 weekly chart performance for "Won't Forget You"
Chart (2026)	Peak position
Belarus Airplay (TopHit)	123
CIS Airplay (TopHit)	195
Lithuania Airplay (TopHit)	92
Moldova Airplay (TopHit)	34
Romania Airplay (TopHit)	83
Ukraine Airplay (TopHit)	98

=== Monthly charts ===
2022 monthly chart performance for "Won't Forget You"
Chart (2022)	Peak position
CIS Airplay (TopHit)	1
Russia Airplay (TopHit)	3
Slovakia (Rádio Top 100)	51
Slovakia (Singles Digitál Top 100)	62
Ukraine Airplay (TopHit)	2

2023 monthly chart performance for "Won't Forget You"
Chart (2023)	Peak position
CIS Airplay (TopHit)	43
Belarus Airplay (TopHit)	50
Moldova Airplay (TopHit)	5
Romania Airplay (TopHit)	60
Russia Airplay (TopHit)	55
Ukraine Airplay (TopHit)	2

2024 monthly chart performance for "Won't Forget You"
Chart (2024)	Peak position
Belarus Airplay (TopHit)	79
CIS Airplay (TopHit)	81
Russia Airplay (TopHit)	72
Ukraine Airplay (TopHit)	54

2025 monthly chart performance for "Won't Forget You"
Chart (2025)	Peak position
Belarus Airplay (TopHit)	86
Moldova Airplay (TopHit)	97

=== Year-end charts ===
2022 year-end chart performance for "Won't Forget You"
Chart (2022)	Position
CIS Airplay (TopHit)	5
Hungary (Dance Top 40)	20
Hungary (Rádiós Top 40)	51
Hungary (Single Top 40)	28
Lithuania (AGATA)	47
Poland Airplay (ZPAV)	3
Russia Airplay (TopHit)	9
Ukraine Airplay (TopHit)	1

2023 year-end chart performance for "Won't Forget You"
Chart (2023)	Position
Belarus Airplay (TopHit)	66
CIS Airplay (TopHit)	46
Hungary (Dance Top 40)	15
Hungary (Rádiós Top 40)	21
Lithuania Airplay (TopHit)	124
Moldova Airplay (TopHit)	10
Romania Airplay (TopHit)	110
Russia Airplay (TopHit)	80
Ukraine Airplay (TopHit)	15

2024 year-end chart performance for "Won't Forget You"
Chart (2024)	Peak position
Belarus Airplay (TopHit)	108
CIS Airplay (TopHit)	133
Hungary (Dance Top 40)	77
Hungary (Rádiós Top 40)	91
Lithuania Airplay (TopHit)	99
Ukraine Airplay (TopHit)	86

2025 year-end chart performance for "Won't Forget You"
Chart (2025)	Position
Belarus Airplay (TopHit)	131
Lithuania Airplay (TopHit)	147
Moldova Airplay (TopHit)	71
Romania Airplay (TopHit)	167

=== Decade-end charts ===
20s Decade-end chart performance for "Won't Forget You"
Chart (2020–2025)	Position
Belarus Airplay (TopHit)	13
CIS Airplay (TopHit)	16
Lithuania Airplay (TopHit)	50
Moldova Airplay (TopHit)	10
Romania Airplay (TopHit)	76
Russia Airplay (TopHit)	52
Ukraine Airplay (TopHit)	17

== Certifications ==
Certifications for "Won't Forget You"
Region	Certification	Certified units/sales
Poland (ZPAV)	Gold	62,500^{‡}
Streaming
Greece (IFPI Greece)	Gold	1,000,000^{†}
^{‡} Sales+streaming figures based on certification alone.^{†} Streaming-only figures based on certification alone.
