= Shouse (duo) =

Australian-New Zealand electronic duo

- Origin: Melbourne, Victoria, Australia
- Genres: Acid house; dance; electronic
- Years active: 2015–present
- Labels: 614746; Smooch; Hell Beach/ Onelove
- Members: Ed Service; Jack Madin
- Website: www.shouseshouse.com

Shouse (/ʃaʊs/) are an Australian-New Zealand electronic music duo consisting of Jack Madin and Ed Service. They are best known for their 2017 single "Love Tonight", which experienced renewed popularity in 2021.

== Career ==
In 2011, Ed Service moved from the Hutt Valley near Wellington, New Zealand to Melbourne, in order to become part of the dance music scene in Australia. While in a nightclub in Melbourne, he met local musician Jack Madin, who had a background in folk and rock music. The two musicians decided to become an underground, 'weirdo-house' duo called Shouse. The first song the pair ever wrote together was their soon to be hit single, ''Love Tonight''.

In 2015, Shouse gathered in a warehouse in Brunswick for a recording session, where they recorded the vocals what would become the song "Love Tonight". Edward Service told ABC Radio Melbourne: "We decided to get a big group of mates together … it was just a big group of amateur singers and some of Melbourne's underground music stars of the time." In later interviews, the group have referenced Victor Turner's concept of communitas inspiring their passion for choirs and large participatory musical experiences.

The duo's first two singles "Whisper" and "Support Structure" are sung by Mohini and Maia of band Habits. Their third single "Without You" featured Rachel and fourth single "Text Apology" featured Martha. Their debut EP Openshouse 3 was released in September 2017.

On 14 December 2017, the band released "Love Tonight". The track received a lukewarm reception. Fraya Dinesent from Purple Sneakers said the song was "a mischievous parody" calling it an "endearing homage to the classic 1980s celebrity extravaganza that was Bandaid's 'We Are the World'." (Note: "We Are the World" was not by Band Aid, the charity group known for "Do They Know It's Christmas?", but by USA for Africa, the 1985 American charity group for African famine relief) For the song, Shouse assembled an all-star choir of people they love and admire in their local Melbourne scene.

In December 2018, the band released their second extended play, Into It. Michael Stratford Hutch from Purple Sneakers wrote: "This is sensuous, developed work, that's gratifying to listen to across a variety of contexts—get around it."

The duo took a break from music, Ed working as a community manager at an arts precinct, and Jack as a primary school music teacher.

In March 2021, German electronic music producer Oliver Huntemann and Brazilian DJ and producer Vintage Culture released separate remixes of "Love Tonight" which gained traction on TikTok. This was followed in June 2021 with a remix by French DJ and record producer David Guetta which saw the song appear on national charts across Europe and sent the duo on a debut tour, including a performance at Paris Fashion week on the steps of the Opera Garnier.

In February 2022, Shouse released "Won't Forget You" which was recorded between trips to Europe and a live appearance at the Sydney Opera House on 2021 New Year's Eve and with a choir of over 50 friends and colleagues. The duo said, "'Won't Forget You' is a song about friendship and love, on the connections that last forever. We have all endured a period of disconnection, but we never forget the people who are so important to us. This song is for your best friends, for the family that lives far, for the new friend met in the disco. It's the song that reminds us of what we love. It's a song to sing together."

Shouse released "Never Let You Go" with Jason Derulo on 4 November 2022. This was followed by "Live Without Love" with David Guetta in May 2023.

On 15 June 2024, Shouse presented "Shouse Communitas" at St Paul's Cathedral in Melbourne, as part of the RISING: festival.

In May 2025, Shouse announced the forthcoming release of their debut studio album Collective Ecstasy.

== Discography ==
=== Albums ===
List of albums, with selected chart positions
| Title | Album details | Peak chart positions |
| Title | Album details | AUS Artist |
|---|---|---|
| Collective Ecstasy | Released: 4 July 2025; Label: Hell Beach / OneLove (HB056V); Formats: 2×LP, digital download | 11 |

=== Extended plays ===
List of EPs, with release date and label shown
| Title | EP details |
|---|---|
| Openshouse 3 | Released: 1 September 2017; Label: 614746; Formats: Digital download, streaming |
| Into It | Released: 7 December 2018; Label: Shouse (independent); Formats: Digital download, streaming |

=== Singles ===
List of singles, with year released, selected chart positions, and album name shown
| Title | Year | Peak chart positions | | | | | | | | | | Certifications | Album |
| Title | Year | AUS | AUT | BEL (FL) | FRA | GER | ITA | NLD | SPA | SWI | UK | Certifications | Album |
|---|---|---|---|---|---|---|---|---|---|---|---|---|---|
| "Whisper" (featuring Habits) | 2016 | — | — | — | — | — | — | — | — | — | — | | Collective Ecstasy |
| "Support Structure" (featuring Habits) | 2016 | — | — | — | — | — | — | — | — | — | — | | Non-album singles |
| "Without You" (featuring Rachel) | 2017 | — | — | — | — | — | — | — | — | — | — | | Non-album singles |
| "Text Apology" (featuring Martha) | 2017 | — | — | — | — | — | — | — | — | — | — | | Non-album singles |
| "Love Tonight" | 2017 | 22 | 3 | 1 | 8 | 4 | 37 | 2 | 69 | 2 | 18 | ARIA: 5× Platinum; BEA: 2× Platinum; BPI: Platinum; BVMI: Platinum; FIMI: Platinum; PROMUSICAE: Gold; RIAA: Gold; SNEP: Diamond | Collective Ecstasy |
| "Won't Forget You" | 2022 | — | — | — | — | 36 | — | — (Note: "Won't Forget You" did not enter the Dutch Top 100 Singles chart, but peaked at number two on the Dutch Single Tip chart.) | — | 91 | — | | Collective Ecstasy |
| "Never Let You Go" (with Jason Derulo) | 2022 | — | — | — | — | — | — | — | — | — | — | | Non-album singles |
| "Live Without Love" (with David Guetta) | 2023 | — | — | — | — | — | — | — | — | — | — | | Non-album singles |
| "Your Love" (with House Gospel Choir) | 2023 | — | — | — | — | — | — | — | — | — | — | | Non-album singles |
| "Tonic" | 2024 | — | — | — | — | — | — | — | — | — | — | | Non-album singles |
| "Fight for You (Devotion)" (with Marten Lou) | 2024 | — | — | — | — | — | — | — | — | — | — | | Non-album singles |
| "Chains" (with Tina Arena) | 2024 | — | — | — | — | — | — | — | — | — | — | | Non-album singles |
| "Walk with Me" (with Felix Jaehn) | 2024 | — | — | — | — | — | — | — | — | — | — | | Non-album singles |
| "Call My Name" | 2025 | — | — | — | — | — | — | — | — | — | — | | Collective Ecstasy |
| "Sunrise" | 2025 | — | — | — | — | — | — | — | — | — | — | | Collective Ecstasy |
| "Wherever You Are" (with Vance Joy) | 2025 | — | — | — | — | — | — | — | — | — | — | | Collective Ecstasy |
| "Only You" (with Cub Sport) | 2025 | — | — | — | — | — | — | — | — | — | — | | Collective Ecstasy |
| "Take Me (To the Sunrise)" (with Vintage Culture) | 2025 | — | — | — | — | — | — | — | — | — | — | | |
"—" denotes a recording that did not chart or was not released.

== Awards and nominations ==
=== AIR Awards ===
The Australian Independent Record Awards (commonly known informally as AIR Awards) is an annual awards night to recognise, promote and celebrate the success of Australia's Independent Music sector.

| Year | Nominee / work | Award | Result | Ref. |
|---|---|---|---|---|
| 2022 | "Love Tonight" (David Guetta remix) | Best Independent Dance, Electronica or Club Single | Won | |
| 2026 | "Sunrise" | Best Independent Dance / Club Single | Nominated | |
| 2026 | Collective Ecstasy | Best Independent Electronic Album or EP | Nominated | |

=== APRA Awards ===
The APRA Awards are held in Australia and New Zealand by the Australasian Performing Right Association to recognise songwriting skills, sales and airplay performance by its members annually.

| Year | Nominee / work | Award | Result | Ref. |
|---|---|---|---|---|
| 2024 | "Never Let You Go" by Jason Derulo and Shouse (Sean Congues, Jack Madin and Edward Service, Jason Desrouleaux) | Most Performed Dance/Electronic Work | Won | |

=== Music Victoria Awards ===
The Music Victoria Awards, are an annual awards night celebrating Victorian music. They commenced in 2005.

| Year | Nominee / work | Award | Result | Ref. |
|---|---|---|---|---|
| 2021 | Shouse | Best Breakthrough Act | Nominated | |
