= Goosebumps (Travis Scott song) =

2016 single by Travis Scott featuring Kendrick Lamar

Single by Travis Scott featuring Kendrick Lamar

from the album Birds in the Trap Sing McKnight
- Released: December 13, 2016
- Recorded: 2016
- Genre: Psychedelic rap; trap; R&B
- Length: 4:03
- Label: Grand Hustle; Epic
- Songwriters: Jacques Webster II; Kendrick Duckworth; Ronald LaTour; Kevin Gomringer; Tim Gomringer; Michael Dean; Daveon Jackson
- Producers: Cardo; Yung Exclusive; Cubeatz

Travis Scott singles chronology
"Champions" (2016)	"Goosebumps" (2016)	"Beibs in the Trap" (2016)

Kendrick Lamar singles chronology
"Don't Wanna Know" (2016)	"Goosebumps" (2016)	"Walk on By" (2017)

Music video
- "Goosebumps" on YouTube

"Goosebumps" (stylized in all lowercase) is a song by American rapper Travis Scott featuring fellow American rapper Kendrick Lamar. It was sent to rhythmic radio on December 13, 2016, by Grand Hustle Records and Epic Records as the third single from Scott's second studio album, Birds in the Trap Sing McKnight.

Spanish DJ and producer Hvme released a reworked deep house version of the song in mid-2020, accruing millions of streams. However, it was only officially released with Scott's approval on January 15, 2021. The remix debuted at number 85 and later peaked at number 47 on the Billboard Hot 100. It also peaked at number one on the Billboard Hot Dance/Electronic Songs Chart.

== Background ==
During an interview with Billboard, Scott explained how he came into contact with Lamar for "Goosebumps":

I met him at the MTV Video Music Awards one year and he came up to me and was just like, "Yo, man, I fuck with your music. It's super dope and inspirational." I was like, whoa, this is the best rapper in the globe – he fucks with my music! That's one of the things that made me want to keep working on my music and try to keep it going 'cause I'm not the most rappity rap ass nigga. That's not me but I really love Kendrick's music. I really love André [3000]'s music. I really love 'Ye's shit. I really love Jay's shit. I like rappers. It's just dope that these dudes came to La Flame's world to get down on some ill beats.

== Music video ==
The music video was released on April 3, 2017. It was directed by Brthr. Billboard compared it to a "phantasmagorical video-game cut scene", and The Fader called it "a hallucinogenic trip that shows a glimpse of what a zombie movie set in Houston, Texas might look like." The video begins with Scott as a flaming skeleton. After that, it features colorful CGI visuals and strange animations. Scott falls through the sky in a thunderstorm and a snake crawls out of his eye socket. At the end of the video, Scott turns into a half man, half bird creature, as pictured on the cover of Birds in the Trap Sing McKnight.

== Chart performance ==
"Goosebumps" debuted at number 92 on the US Billboard Hot 100 for the week of September 24, 2016. The song then re-entered the chart several times and peaked at number 32, becoming his third top 40 hit. In January 2017, the song was certified Gold by the Recording Industry Association of America (RIAA) for sales of over 500,000 equivalent-units in the United States. The song was certified Platinum in March 2017. The song was certified 17-time platinum in October 2025, beating Drake's "God's Plan" as the highest-certified rap song.

== Live performances ==
On January 21, 2017, Scott performed "Goosebumps" on Jimmy Kimmel Live. Scott broke a Guinness World Record in 2017 for the most consecutive performances of a song during a show after he performed "Goosebumps" 15 times in a row. Coldplay covered the song in a November 2024 show on their Music of The Spheres Tour.

== Charts ==
=== Weekly charts ===
Chart (2016–2024)	Peak position
Australia (ARIA)	45
Australia Hip Hop/R&B (ARIA)	15
Austria (Ö3 Austria Top 40)	34
Canada Hot 100 (Billboard)	56
Czech Republic Singles Digital (ČNS IFPI)	11
France (SNEP)	23
Germany (GfK)	47
Global 200 (Billboard)	91
Greece International (IFPI)	10
Hungary (Stream Top 40)	12
Iceland (Tónlistinn)	31
Ireland (IRMA)	65
Italy (FIMI)	12
Latvia (DigiTop100)	72
Lithuania (AGATA)	39
Netherlands (Single Top 100)	58
Portugal (AFP)	5
Slovakia Airplay (ČNS IFPI)	29
Slovakia Singles Digital (ČNS IFPI)	5
Spain (Promusicae)	51
Sweden (Sverigetopplistan)	46
Switzerland (Schweizer Hitparade)	32
UK Singles (Official Charts)	65
US Billboard Hot 100	32
US Hot R&B/Hip-Hop Songs (Billboard)	21
US Rhythmic Airplay (Billboard)	1

=== Year-end charts ===
Chart (2017)	Position
US Billboard Hot 100	68
US Hot R&B/Hip-Hop Songs (Billboard)	60
US Rhythmic (Billboard)	30

Chart (2018)	Position
Portugal (AFP)	102

Chart (2019)	Position
Portugal (AFP)	128

Chart (2020)	Position
France (SNEP)	186
Hungary (Stream Top 40)	78

Chart (2021)	Position
Austria (Ö3 Austria Top 40)	53
Denmark (Tracklisten)	70
Germany (Official German Charts)	77
Global 200 (Billboard)	95
Hungary (Stream Top 40)	29
Portugal (AFP)	86
Sweden (Sverigetopplistan)	80

== Certifications ==
Region	Certification	Certified units/sales
Australia (ARIA)	5× Platinum	350,000^{‡}
Austria (IFPI Austria)	3× Platinum	90,000^{‡}
Belgium (BRMA)	Platinum	40,000^{‡}
Brazil (Pro-Música Brasil)	3× Diamond	750,000^{‡}
Canada (Music Canada)	6× Platinum	480,000^{‡}
Denmark (IFPI Danmark)	3× Platinum	270,000^{‡}
France (SNEP)	Diamond	333,333^{‡}
Germany (BVMI)	2× Platinum	800,000^{‡}
Italy (FIMI)	4× Platinum	400,000^{‡}
Mexico (AMPROFON)	2× Diamond	600,000^{‡}
New Zealand (RMNZ)	8× Platinum	240,000^{‡}
Poland (ZPAV)	Diamond	250,000^{‡}
Portugal (AFP)	7× Platinum	70,000^{‡}
Spain (Promusicae)	Gold	20,000^{‡}
United Kingdom (BPI)	3× Platinum	1,800,000^{‡}
United States (RIAA)	17× Platinum	17,000,000^{‡}
Streaming
Greece (IFPI Greece)	3× Platinum	6,000,000^{†}
Sweden (GLF)	Gold	4,000,000^{†}
^{‡} Sales+streaming figures based on certification alone.^{†} Streaming-only figures based on certification alone.

== HVME version ==
"Goosebumps"

Single by HVME
- Released: June 12, 2020
- Genre: Deep house
- Length: 2:43
- Label: Lithuania HQ; B1; Columbia
- Songwriters: Brock Korsan; Jacques Webster II; Kendrick Duckworth; Ronald LaTour; Kevin Gomringer; Tim Gomringer; Michael Dean; Daveon Jackson
- Producer: HVME

HVME singles chronology
"Goosebumps" (2020)	"Goosebumps (Remix)" (2021)

Music video
- "Goosebumps" on YouTube

A cover of the track by Spanish DJ HVME (pronounced "hume") was released on June 12, 2020. The official music video premiered days later, on June 18, 2020; through record label Lithuania HQ's YouTube channel. The cover version managed to chart in several European countries as Italy, Germany and the Netherlands.

=== Charts ===
==== Weekly charts ====
Chart (2020–2021)	Peak position
Austria (Ö3 Austria Top 40)	25
Belgium (Ultratop 50 Flanders)	14
Belgium (Ultratop 50 Wallonia)	18
CIS Airplay (TopHit)	4
Denmark (Tracklisten)	17
Germany (GfK)	14
Ireland (IRMA)	5
Finland (Suomen virallinen lista)	20
France (SNEP)	57
Italy (FIMI)	94
Lithuania (AGATA)	10
Netherlands (Dutch Top 40)	11
Netherlands (Single Top 100)	9
Norway (VG-lista)	22
Portugal (AFP)	60
Russia Airplay (TopHit) Remix	2
Slovakia Airplay (ČNS IFPI)	91
Slovakia Singles Digital (ČNS IFPI)	18
Sweden (Sverigetopplistan)	24
Switzerland (Schweizer Hitparade)	12

==== Year-end charts ====
2021 year-end chart performance for "Goosebumps"
Chart (2021)	Position
Belgium (Ultratop Flanders)	51
Belgium (Ultratop Wallonia)	78
CIS (TopHit)	9
Denmark (Tracklisten)	52
Ireland (IRMA)	27
Netherlands (Dutch Top 40)	85
Netherlands (Single Top 100)	89
Portugal (AFP)	18
Russia Airplay (TopHit)	4
Switzerland (Schweizer Hitparade)	26

2022 year-end chart performance for "Goosebumps"
Chart (2022)	Position
Russia Airplay (TopHit)	73

=== Certifications ===
Certifications for Hvme's "Goosebumps"
Region	Certification	Certified units/sales
Austria (IFPI Austria)	Platinum	30,000^{‡}
Belgium (BRMA)	Gold	20,000^{‡}
Brazil (Pro-Música Brasil)	Platinum	40,000^{‡}
Denmark (IFPI Danmark)	Platinum	90,000^{‡}
Germany (BVMI)	Platinum	400,000^{‡}
Mexico (AMPROFON)	Gold	30,000^{‡}
Portugal (AFP)	2× Platinum	20,000^{‡}
Switzerland (IFPI Switzerland)	Gold	10,000^{‡}
Streaming
Sweden (GLF)	Gold	4,000,000^{†}
^{‡} Sales+streaming figures based on certification alone.^{†} Streaming-only figures based on certification alone.

== Travis Scott and HVME remix ==
"Goosebumps (Remix)"

Single by Travis Scott and HVME
- Released: January 15, 2021
- Genre: Deep house
- Length: 2:42
- Label: Epic; Cactus Jack
- Songwriters: Brock Korsan; Jacques Webster II; Kendrick Duckworth; Ronald LaTour; Kevin Gomringer; Tim Gomringer; Michael Dean; Daveon Jackson
- Producer: Hvme

Travis Scott singles chronology
"Franchise" (2020)	"Goosebumps (Remix)" (2021)	"Buss It (Remix)" (2021)

Hvme singles chronology
"Goosebumps" (2020)	"Goosebumps (Remix)" (2021)	"Alright" (2021)

Audio video
- "Goosebumps" (Hvme remix) on YouTube

Due to its success and rising popularity, the HVME cover was officially released with Scott's approval on January 15, 2021. The remix debuted at number 85 and later peaked at number 47 on the Billboard Hot 100. It also peaked at number one on the Billboard Hot Dance/Electronic Songs Chart.

=== Charts ===
==== Weekly charts ====
Chart (2021)	Peak position
Australia (ARIA)	5
Canada Hot 100 (Billboard)	10
CIS Airplay (TopHit) Remix	14
France (SNEP)	10
Global 200 (Billboard)	15
Greece International (IFPI)	13
Hungary (Single Top 40)	33
Hungary (Stream Top 40)	9
Iceland (Tónlistinn)	24
India International Singles (IMI)	14
Ireland (IRMA)	4
Lithuania (AGATA)	17
Mexico Airplay (Billboard)	36
New Zealand (Recorded Music NZ)	22
Poland Airplay (ZPAV)	98
South Africa (RISA)	6
Spain (PROMUSICAE)	51
UK Singles (Official Charts)	8
UK Dance (Official Charts)	4
US Billboard Hot 100	47
US Hot Dance/Electronic Songs (Billboard)	1
US Pop Airplay (Billboard)	14
US Rhythmic Airplay (Billboard)	33

==== Year-end charts ====
Year-end chart performance for "Goosebumps"
Chart (2021)	Position
Australia (ARIA)	17
Canada (Canadian Hot 100)	17
France (SNEP)	21
Germany (Official German Charts)	65
Global 200 (Billboard)	32
Italy (FIMI)	96
UK Singles (OCC)	31
US Hot Dance/Electronic Songs (Billboard)	1
US Mainstream Top 40 (Billboard)	45

=== Certifications ===
Region	Certification	Certified units/sales
Australia (ARIA)	2× Platinum	140,000^{‡}
Brazil (Pro-Música Brasil)	2× Diamond	320,000^{‡}
Canada (Music Canada)	2× Platinum	160,000^{‡}
France (SNEP)	Diamond	333,333^{‡}
Mexico (AMPROFON)	Platinum	140,000^{‡}
Poland (ZPAV)	2× Platinum	100,000^{‡}
Spain (Promusicae)	3× Platinum	180,000^{‡}
United Kingdom (BPI)	Platinum	600,000^{‡}
Streaming
Greece (IFPI Greece)	Platinum	2,000,000^{†}
^{‡} Sales+streaming figures based on certification alone.^{†} Streaming-only figures based on certification alone.

== In popular culture ==
The song is featured in the soundtrack for the 2018 film The Hate U Give. The song was also featured in the 2023 supernatural horror series Goosebumps, based on the eponymous children's novel series by R.L. Stine. It was also featured in the Paul Thomas Anderson film One Battle After Another.

== Radio and release history ==
Release dates and formats for "Goosebumps"
Country	Date	Format	Version	Label	Ref.
United States	December 13, 2016	Rhythmic contemporary	Solo	Grand Hustle; Epic	
United States	January 24, 2017	Contemporary hit radio	Solo	Grand Hustle; Epic	
Italy	January 29, 2021	Contemporary hit radio	HVME remix	Epic; Cactus Jack	

== See also ==
- List of Billboard number-one dance songs of 2021
