= Could Cry Just Thinkin About You =

2021 song by Troye Sivan

Single by Troye Sivan

from the EP In a Dream
- Released: 9 July 2021
- Genre: Rock; country
- Length: 2:38
- Label: EMI; Universal; Capitol
- Songwriters: Troye Mellet; Teo Halm
- Producer: Teo Halm

Troye Sivan singles chronology
"You" (2021)	"Could Cry Just Thinkin About You" (2021)	"Angel Baby" (2021)

Music video
- "Could Cry Just Thinkin About You" on YouTube

"Could Cry Just Thinkin About You" is a song by Australian singer-songwriter Troye Sivan. The track was included on Sivan's fifth EP, In a Dream (2020), as a 51-second interlude, before being released in full on 9 July 2021.

At the 2021 ARIA Music Awards, the song's video, co-directed by Sivan and Jesse Gohier-Fleet, was nominated for Best Video.

== Background and release ==
In reviewing the EP in August 2020, Stephen Daw of Billboard said "This stripped-down, '70s-rock ballad is a welcome new sound in Sivan's repertoire. "Could Cry" shows Sivan exploring the wreckage of a broken relationship, wondering how he's going to move forward. It's a lovely sound, I just wish we got to hear more of it".

The full version was released on 9 July 2021, a year after it was reported that Sivan had split from his partner of four years, model Jacob Bixenman.

Upon release Sivan said "I wrote this song crying in my kitchen just as life started to fall apart a bit. Recorded the vocal there n then, and put it as an interlude on the EP. now..surprise! could cry just thinking about you (Full Version) is out on all streaming platforms. saddest song ever but we okay now."

== Music video ==
The music video was directed by Sivan and Jesse Gohier-Fleet and released on 8 July 2021.

== Charts ==
Chart performance for "Could Cry Just Thinkin About You"
Chart (2020–2021)	Peak position
New Zealand Hot Singles (RMNZ)	19

== Release history ==
Region	Date	Format	Label	Ref.
Various	9 July 2021	Digital download; streaming	EMI; Universal; Capitol	
