= Easy (Troye Sivan song) =

2020 song by Troye Sivan

Single by Troye Sivan

from the EP In a Dream
- Released: 15 July 2020
- Genre: Synth-pop
- Length: 3:46
- Label: EMI; Universal; Capitol
- Songwriters: Troye Mellet; Oscar Görres
- Producer: Oscar Görres

Troye Sivan singles chronology
"Take Yourself Home" (2020)	"Easy" (2020)	"Rager Teenager!" (2020)

Music video
- "Easy" on YouTube

"Easy" is a song by Australian singer-songwriter Troye Sivan from his fifth extended play (EP), In a Dream (2020). It was released on 15 July 2020, as the second single from the EP, accompanied by its music video directed by Sivan.

At the ARIA Music Awards of 2020, "Easy" was nominated for Best Video. On 10 December 2020, Sivan released a new version of the song featuring country singer-songwriter Kacey Musgraves and producer Mark Ronson.

== Background ==
Lyrically, "Easy" is a song about someone trying to salvage a dying relationship. Sivan sings of how being in love with his partner was "easy" and begs him to "please don't leave me". The track was allegedly written about Sivan's breakup with American model and photographer Jacob Bixenman, whom he had dated from 2016 to 2020.

== Critical reception ==
Justin Curto of Vulture called the song "a more relaxed outing than 'Take Yourself Home', built around some drums, lots of autotune, and a flute-y synth solo". Stephen Daw of Billboard wrote: "With '80s-twinged production and Sivan's classic laid-back delivery, 'Easy' follows the star as he examines a crumbling relationship, begging his lover to give their relationship a second chance."

== Music video ==
Released on 16 July 2020, the self-directed video focuses on a heartbroken Sivan attempting to come to terms with a recent breakup in a large mansion. Visually, the video uses a muted grey, blue and green colour palette as Sivan sings until he sits down to watch an 80's-inspired music video on television which features Sivan paying homage to David Bowie, wearing a vintage brown Gucci suit and black leather gloves, sporting bright red hair and white and yellow makeup while backed by a band of drag queens on a bright, neon pink set. Sivan then succumbs to the pain of losing his lover as a mirror falls on top of him, leaving a huge cut on his forehead. Clips of Sivan performing as Bowie and sitting alone in the mansion drinking and crying are interspersed with him dancing shakily around the room. His body subsequently bursts into flames in the shape of a cross and Sivan falls backwards into a pool and sinks to the bottom. The video received 300,000 views within its first nine hours of release and has currently accumulated almost 10 million views on YouTube. A shot of Sivan in the pool is used as the cover art for In a Dream. The video was nominated for the ARIA Award for Best Video at the 2020 ARIA Music Awards.

== Charts ==
Chart (2020)	Peak position
Hungary (Single Top 40)	4
New Zealand Hot Singles (RMNZ)	11

== Certifications ==
Certifications for "Easy"
Region	Certification	Certified units/sales
Australia (ARIA)	Platinum	70,000^{‡}
New Zealand (RMNZ)	Gold	15,000^{‡}
United States (RIAA)	Gold	500,000^{‡}
^{‡} Sales+streaming figures based on certification alone.

== Release history ==
Release dates and formats
Region	Date	Format	Label	Ref.
Various	15 July 2020	Digital download; streaming	EMI; Universal; Capitol	

== Remix ==
"Easy" (remix)

Single by Troye Sivan and Kacey Musgraves featuring Mark Ronson
- Released: 10 December 2020
- Genre: Disco-pop
- Length: 3:34
- Label: EMI; Universal; Capitol
- Songwriters: Troye Mellet; Oscar Görres; Kacey Musgraves
- Producers: Mark Ronson; Picard Brothers; Oscar Görres

Troye Sivan singles chronology
"Rager Teenager!" (2020)	"Easy" (remix) (2020)	"You" (2021)

Kacey Musgraves singles chronology
"Rainbow" (2019)	"Easy" (remix) (2020)	"Justified" (2021)

Mark Ronson singles chronology
"I Want to See the Bright Lights Tonight" (2020)	"Easy" (remix) (2020)	"Too Much" (2022)

Music video
- "Easy" (remix) on YouTube

"Easy" was remixed with vocals from American singer Kacey Musgraves and production from British musician Mark Ronson. It was released on 10 December 2020. Musgraves co-wrote and performed a new verse for the song, and Ronson added a "disco-pop heartbeat" to the track.

=== Background and release ===
Sivan tweeted that he collaborated with "two of [his] favourite artists of all time" and filmed a music video that "[had] potential to be [his] favourite [he's] ever made" in November, and announced his collaboration with Musgraves and Ronson on 7 December. Sivan and Musgraves previously collaborated on the song "Glittery" from The Kacey Musgraves Christmas Show (2019).

The song was sent to contemporary hit radio in the United States on 2 February 2021, making it Musgraves' first pop radio crossover single.

Sivan and Musgraves performed the song live for the first time on 1 September 2026 at Madison Square Garden during the fifth night of Musgraves' Middle of Nowhere Tour.

=== Music video ===
The music video for the remix was filmed in Nashville, Tennessee and directed by Bardia Zeinali, who previously directed the music video for Sivan's 2018 song "Dance to This". It was released to coincide with the song on 10 December 2020. It features Sivan and Musgraves as two people on the run, driving vintage cars, dyeing their hair in a motel bathroom and going to melodramatic drag shows, with Sivan explaining to Vogue that his and Musgraves's character have "separately had our own experiences, regrets, scorned our lovers and will find solace in each other".

=== Track listing ===
Digital download
No.	Title	Length
1.	"Easy" (remix)	3:34

=== Chart ===
Chart performance for "Easy" (Remix)
Chart (2020)	Peak position
New Zealand Hot Singles (RMNZ)	14

=== Release history ===
Release dates and formats for "Easy (Remix)"
Region	Date	Format	Label	Ref.
Various	10 December 2020	Digital download; streaming	EMI Music Australia; Universal Music Australia; Capitol	
United States	2 February 2021	Contemporary hit radio	Capitol	
