= MTV Europe Music Award for Artist on the Rise =

Category of MTV Europe Music Awards

The following is a list of the MTV Europe Music Award winners and nominees for Artist on the Rise.

== Winners and nominees ==
Year	Winner	Nominees
2013	Austin Mahone; 14 538 518 Twitter votes	Ariana Grande 14 227 375 Twitter votes; Cher Lloyd 1 469 139 Twitter votes; Cody Simpson 549 795 Twitter votes; Bridgit Mendler 123 448 Twitter votes; Lorde 52 547 Twitter votes
2014	5 Seconds Of Summer; 105 367 459 Twitter votes	Fifth Harmony 103 524 595 Twitter votes; Lucy Hale 828 949 Twitter votes; Nick Jonas 756 127 Twitter votes; Jake Miller 574 403 Twitter votes
2015	Troye Sivan	Tori Kelly; Travis Scott; Halsey; Kygo
