= Oliver Huntemann =

German musician

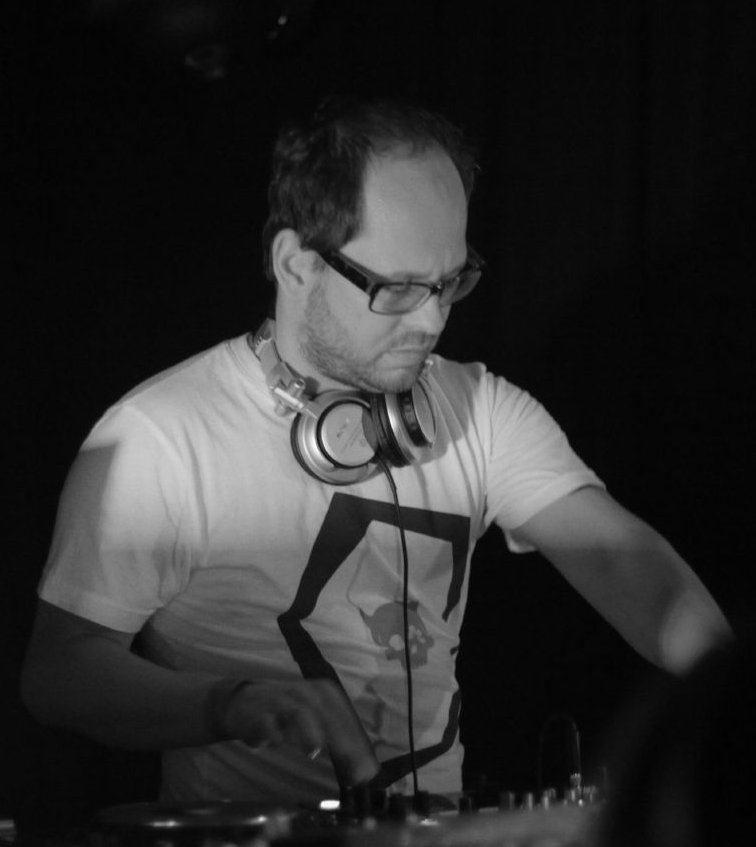
- Huntemann in 2009

Background information
- Birth name: Oliver Huntemann
- Born: 19 June 1968 (age 56); Hannover, Germany
- Origin: Hamburg, Germany
- Genres: Techno
- Labels: Ideal Audio, Confused Recordings, Dance Electric
- Website: oliverhuntemann.de

Oliver Huntemann (born 19 June 1968 in Hannover) is a German electronic music producer and internationally touring DJ.

== Selected discography ==
=== Albums ===
- Propaganda (October 2017 - Senso Sounds)
- Paranoia (November 2011 - Confused Recordings)
- H-3 (May 2009 – Ideal Audio)
- Fieber (March 2006 – Confused Recordings/Gigolo Records)
- Too Many Presents For One Girl (2004 – Confused Recordings)

=== Singles ===
- Poltergeist (September 2017 - Senso Sounds)
- Rotlicht (July 2017 - Senso Sounds)
- Shanghai Spinner (June 2009 - Ideal Audio)
- Rikarda (February 2009 – Ideal Audio)
- PLAY! 02 ep: Paris/La Boum (April 2008 – Confused Recordings)
- Hamburger Berg (Dec 2007 – Confused Recordings)
- PLAY! 01 ep: São Paulo (Mar 2007 – Confused Recordings)
- German Beauty (Dec 2006 – Confused Recordings)
- Fieber Remixes (Aug 2006 – Confused Recordings)
- Broadcast Service (September 2005 – Dance Electric)
- Terminate The Fire (feat. Chelonis R. Jones) (July 2005 – Dance Electric)
- Sweet Sensations (May 2005 – Confused Recordings/Gigolo Records)
- DiscoTech UK Mixes – (November 2003 – Confused Recordings)
- Freeze (September 2003 – Confused Recordings)
- DiscoTech (2003 – Confused Recordings / Zomba)
- Phreaks 2.1 (2001 – Panik)
- Wildes Treiben (2001 – Confused Recordings)
- Alte Liebe (2000 – Confused Recordings)
- Playground (1997 – Confused Recordings)
- Electric City (1996 – Confused Recordings)
- Styles (1995 – Confused Recordings)
