= In a Dream (EP) =

2020 EP by Troye Sivan

EP by Troye Sivan
- Released: 21 August 2020
- Recorded: 2020
- Genres: Dance-pop; indie pop; indie rock; tech house; house; pop rock; new wave
- Length: 19:26
- Labels: EMI Australia; Capitol
- Producers: Oscar Görres; Teo Halm

Troye Sivan chronology
Bloom (2018)	In a Dream (2020)	Something to Give Each Other (2023)

Singles from In a Dream
- 1. "Take Yourself Home" Released: 1 April 2020; 2. "Easy" Released: 15 July 2020; 3. "Rager Teenager!" Released: 5 August 2020

In a Dream is the fifth extended play (EP) by the Australian singer-songwriter Troye Sivan, released on 21 August 2020 through EMI Music Australia and Capitol Records. It follows the release of his second studio album Bloom (2018), and features the singles "Take Yourself Home", "Easy", and "Rager Teenager!".

Sivan described the "concept EP" as "a story that's still unfolding, this small collection of songs explores an emotional rollercoaster period in my life when the feelings and thoughts were most shockingly fresh. Revisiting these songs and moments is tough, but I'm proud of this music and excited to have it out in the world."

Initially scheduled for a late 2020 arrival, In a Dream was released early, after the COVID-19 pandemic caused Sivan to change his perspective about the music. The EP, which features a dance-pop sound, was positively received by critics, who complimented Sivan's lyrics and sonic experimentation.

The EP was nominated for the ARIA Award for Best Pop Release.

== Background ==
When the COVID-19 pandemic began in early 2020, Sivan travelled from his Los Angeles home to spend time with his family in Melbourne, only to find himself subject to the city's lockdown; Sivan commented:

It's crazy to be doing this again at 25... I slipped back into old habits so quickly. It's funny — give me three months, six months, however long it's been to do absolutely nothing, and I completely regressed back to 17-year-old Troye, lying in my bed, just watching dumb shit on YouTube.

== Development ==
In Sivan's cover story with NME, many details about In a Dream were revealed. The EP was partially inspired by his life circumstances of 2020, with Sivan explaining that he was enjoying "getting in touch with that kind of boredom again" and "doing shit that I would never ever do normally": "It hasn't come to me super naturally, because such a big part of my process is collaborating with other people. I don't play an instrument, so though I might write lyrics and melody by myself, I need someone on chords, whether it's on piano or guitar."

Sivan also felt it was "too early to be working on my [next studio] album. I was still on tour for Bloom for some of this, and as it was coming to an end, I was feeling all of this stuff." He would write one song one day, and a "completely different-sounding song" the next day as ideas came to him. "Before I knew it, I was like, 'Whoa — I have this body of this work, this EP, whatever'. I didn't know what it was. All I know is that this really sums up these last couple of weeks or months in my life. [...] It wasn't about trying to make a cohesive pop album or EP. It was, 'How can we tell these stories in the most accurate and emotive way?'"

In an interview with The Sydney Morning Herald, Sivan said he also wrote many of the songs amidst the end of his relationship with model Jacob Bixenman, commenting "I didn't think I was writing an entire project, I was just taking it day by day and then I turned around and had this potent, concise, weird project that is a time capsule for some of the most intense weeks of my life." He said that he was inspired by Bruce Springsteen and Amy Winehouse for the EP.

== Concept ==
The closing title track was inspired by a dream (about Sivan's lost love) so intense, Sivan woke up crying.

In an interview with Don't Bore Us, Sivan elaborated on the loose concept of In a Dream:

"I [didn't] really know what I would call [In a Dream] because the truth is I didn't really start this project thinking I was making anything in particular. I normally go into the album writing process with a sonic mood board with a playlist of sounds that inspire me or artists that inspire me. I have a really good sense of what I'm trying to achieve. And then with this it was different in that I was just sort of going through this rollercoaster in my mind and I was really just going to the studio just because I was feeling a different way every hour let alone every day. I think that's why it's turned out to be such a weird project in that it doesn't really have one sound. I'm exploring the same kind of story from different angles and I think the thing that ties it all together is that it's this very potent and concise collection of songs that were all written in short succession. I guess that's sort of the concept! It was sort of unintentional but it's really about an intense time of my life in this time capsule."

== Composition ==
In a Dream was described as a dance-pop break-up record that features "a hallucinogenic sound" and captures "tempestuous and extreme moods".

Pitchfork's Shaad D'Souza described the EP as "a formally adventurous break-up record that explores the far corners of indie pop" that "chooses distinctiveness over approachability, offering a bricolage of warped indie rock, tech house, and theatre-kid emotion".

Mark Kennedy of ABC News called the EP "a perfectly-timed appetizer for an evolving artist—a wistful and experimental musical postcard for an uneasy era. Many songs have an extended house break, as if Sivan was stepping away to dance furiously on his own. [...] Görres and Sivan stretch and play with song structure and length."

Sivan stated that "anyone who's going through a major sort of life shift knows the way that it really is like a rollercoaster, and I think that’s why [the record] ended up feeling as chaotic as it does with all these different moments and sounds… it just felt like the only way to really do that experience justice." The producer-writer relationship the duo (Sivan/Görres) shared helped the creative process: "[Sivan] wants to challenge and take risks musically, which I love," Görres said. “We have a mutual trust which gives us creative freedom. It’s crucial to create a safe environment where you can try crazy ideas without fear of judgement. The happy accidents are oftentimes when the magic happens.”

=== Songs ===
Sivan described "Take Yourself Home", saying, "I loved the idea of there being this really gentle, beautiful acoustic guitar and this like gentle, beautiful melody." The "catchy" song took on a darker atmosphere than originally intended, featuring a "haunting melody" and an electronic dance coda. Paper called it "perhaps the first great song to come out of our collective apocalyptic state of mind during the COVID-19 outbreak".

"Easy" contains "80s pop synths", evoking "an earlier version of Troye with an upgraded style" and "stylized" autotune. The song was described as having a Pretty in Pink vibe. It almost did not make the track list, but producer Max Martin chimed in and said he loved it. During the EP's sessions in Los Angeles, "Max came into the studio and listened to a few songs, and he really freaked out about 'Easy,'" Sivan says. He wrote the song after a night out during which he realised the power that can stem from being free of your inhibitions. Vulture said, "'Easy' is a pixelated cloud, a night drive to nowhere, a neon-blue bubble bath, a fizzy cola gummy." Naming it as one of the "10 songs you need in your life this week" upon the single release, The Fader praised Sivan's “laser focused intent to push into a more sophisticated, emotionally-torn pop realm." Billboard hailed "Easy" as a “crying-on-the-dancefloor anthem…[that] boasts a synth-heavy earworm melody and heartbreaking lyrics that will have you dancing and dreaming about your ex.”

The country-tinged "Could Cry Just Thinkin About You", with a duration of 52 seconds, is a "stripped-down, '70s-rock ballad".

"Stud", a "lascivious, sun-kissed centerpiece", was called "a fantastical gay love song" that "morphs" from a piano ballad to a house anthem." Sivan's distorted vocals wail over the song's "infectious" dance break with deep, ear-ringing base notes. It drew inspiration from "an inexplicable yearning for validation from men who possessed bodies like Tom of Finland illustrations—stealth symbols of power and masculinity." Sivan expanded on this, saying, "It never really got to me until it did. I was feeling really insecure about myself and my body. Weirdly, I still have a secret Tumblr where I just followed p-rn and hot guys, right? I constantly was seeing the same body type that wasn't mine. I would never say this in any other context, but I feel like I know I'm a cute white boy. A 'twinky' thing — I get it. I fully recognize that so many people feel so much more sh-t than I do. I wanted to put it out on the table and talk about it."

"Rager Teenager!" is a "slow burn" ballad featuring "chaotic drums" and a "full melodic breakdown" with "soothing harmonies" of the backing synths, as well as baritone vocals. The production of "In a Dream" is "pure, dreamy pop-rock at its finest, with a relentlessly positive drum beat, chunky guitar licks and shimmering synths." Sivan called it his favorite track from the EP: "It's just weird in the way we wrote it because it started off as this dreamy ballad song and I had this dreamy ballad concept and then Oscar who I work with started putting these relentless and chaotic heavy drums behind it and then I thought 'oh that's too much'. Then he added this acoustic guitar and I almost like cried. It just took shape in a way I didn't expect, I don't really know how he did it, it was a weird song for me, in a good way. It keeps me on my toes I guess!"

The vinyl edition of the EP has a bonus track, titled "10/10". Sivan called it "a guitar ballad" that was "trying different sounds", elaborating that the "club production" on "Stud" "helps set the aesthetic for what's happening lyrically in that song". The Target deluxe edition includes an acoustic version of "Take Yourself Home", while the UK vinyl edition includes a "voice memo" for "Easy".

=== Art ===
The cover for In a Dream features a 'dreamy' expression from a red-tinted Sivan against a watery-blue, sky-like background. It comes from a shot in the "Easy" music video in which Sivan falls backwards into a pool. The video was directed by Sivan himself, with art direction led by Bardia Zeinali. The 'Easy' title was designed by Aleksi Tammi.

== Themes ==
Critics enjoyed "the humanizing emotion in [Sivan's] lyrics and the narration of a greater story". Sivan "swims among shards of broken hearts and drowns in sensuality" throughout In a Dream. He "comes to grips with the aftermath of a doomed relationship, consciously portraying the greenness of [past] first-time experiences with [a] more seasoned perspective, as well as mindfully considering the beliefs and misconceptions that he innocently held as a teen."

The songwriting on "Take Yourself Home" evokes a calming feeling, as Sivan reassures listeners that, while they might be anxious and afraid now, eventually everything will turn out. Sivan said "when I wrote it, it was just me to myself, me to some of the relationships in my life".

On "Easy", with "stunningly sad" and "shockingly intimate" lyrics like "I can't even look at you, would you look at the space just next to your feet? / The wood is warping, the lines distorting", the song maintains Sivan's "casual demeanor", resulting in one of his most "fascinating pop concoctions". The chorus drops listeners "into the fire of a lovers' reunion": "What the hell did we do? / Tell me we'll make it through / 'Cause he made it easy / Please don't leave me". Sivan shared, "It's easy to feel like your life is written, like it's going in a direction and that's the [only] direction it’s going in. You don't realize that it's happening, but over time that becomes so comfortable. Then something will happen that will pull the rug out from under your feet and take you by surprise. I hadn't realized how comfortable I'd become. I was cruising through life. And then something like this [heartbreak] happens, and it shakes you. Little did I know that would be one of many wake up calls for 2020."

"Could Cry Just Thinkin About You" shows Sivan exploring the wreckage of a broken relationship, wondering how he is going to move forward.

"Stud" has "achingly relatable" lyrics about a one-night stand (after a fantasy, gay club outing) with the song's titular hunk, as Sivan appraises "all the muscles and the features I want." As NME writer Richard S. He noted, the song's "lovedrunk opening chorus" would have brought a tear to the late George Michael's eyes: "Hey, tough / What’s it like to be so big and strong and so buff? / Everything I’m not but could I still be a hunk to you? / A stud to you?" Later in the song, he asks, sounding almost forlorn, “How much of me would you take? / How much of me would you change? / On second thought, don't say a thing." Sivan added: "It starts off super introspective, in my head, and then takes you to this club scene, where you meet this hunky guy who's there to save you from all of your body image issues." Pitchfork wrote that "Stud" "dives into heart-racing casual sex, hinging on a classic trope of queer desire: Do I want to be him, or f--k him? (Call it the Call Me by Your Name conundrum.)"

"Rager Teenager!", a "sheer insight of Sivan's songwriting", is a declaration of nostalgic angst: "I just wanna f--k s--t up and just ride in your car tonight, in your bed tonight." He's alternately sentimental: "Hey, my little rager teenager / I've missed you around." According to Vulture, the "song [is] about the pleasure of regressing to the days when life's responsibilities seemed to matter less."

On "In a Dream", Sivan "sings about putting an ex out of mind, or perhaps fighting away your intrusive negative thoughts": “But I won’t let you in again / I'm gonna lock the doors and hide my shit / ’Cause my spirit's wearin' thin and there's only so much I can give." The title track's lyrics are "honest and direct, as Troye confronts the idea of living without his ex, who won't stop appearing in his dreams. It's simultaneously uplifting and introspective, which is perhaps the purest distillation of Sivan's music yet."

== Music videos ==
Troye had written treatments for five music videos, but due to Melbourne's strict lockdown laws, was only able to film "Easy" and "Rager Teenager!" Instead, Sivan allocated much of his original video budget to collaborations with freelance artists, while directing himself for the first time.

The music video for "Easy" depicts Sivan as a "David Bowie doppelganger, complete with face makeup, a shock of red hair, and a '70s suit". The video also features a drag queen band.

NME considered the "Rager Teenager!" video (and song) as possibly Sivan's "most moving" to date: "[It] takes place entirely in a bathtub. As he sings, he averts his eyes, getting lost in the song's drifting emotions. When he finally looks straight at the camera, it's hard not to get chills."

== Release ==
Lead single "Take Yourself Home" was initially intended for a late 2020 release, but due to COVID-19, it "changed meanings" for Sivan and "became a much bigger world view song". Sivan wanted to collaborate with "as many creatives as [he] possibly [could]" after seeing people he cared lose their jobs. After realising his songs might resonate with others, he pushed the release forward.

=== Promotion ===
Sivan first announced he would be releasing new music over Instagram Live. On 1 September 2020, he posted his first YouTube vlog in over 2 years, with the "Could Cry Just Thinkin About You" interlude featured at the end.

=== Singles ===
"Take Yourself Home" was released on 1 April 2020 on a whim by Sivan; it was initially accompanied by a lyric video directed by Lanning Sally and followed by 9 lyric videos of different languages made with the help of numerous artists and a "Live From Home" video. The single has over 92 million cumulative global streams.

The second single, "Easy", was released on 15 July 2020 and a music video for the track was released directed by Sivan himself. Upon the release of In a Dream, it was reported that "Easy" had topped 36 million streams in the US.

The third single, "Rager Teenager!", was released by surprise on 5 August 2020 along with a self-directed music video.

"Easy" and "Rager Teenager!" both appeared on more than 40 New Music Friday playlists.

== Critical reception ==
Professional ratings
Review scores
Source	Rating
AllMusic	4/5 stars
Pitchfork	7.6/10
Slant Magazine	3/5 stars
Dork	5/5 stars

In a Dream received generally favourable reviews from critics, with The Sydney Morning Herald writer Nathanael Cooper calling the release "Sivan's most creatively daring and personal music to date". Stephen Daw of Billboard ranked the standard edition's songs: the title track was ranked first, followed by "Easy", "Stud", "Take Yourself Home", "Rager Teenager!" and lastly, "Could Cry Just Thinkin About You". However, Daw talked positively about all the songs, only critiquing the latter's short length.

Shaad D'Souza of Pitchfork rated the EP positively: "The Australian pop singer finds freedom in the EP format, breaking the family-friendly veneer of past releases and serving up his most idiosyncratic music yet. [...] These idiosyncratic choices may sacrifice some of Sivan's universal appeal, but it's much more fun to watch him cutting his own path." The Santa Fe New Mexican writer Olivia Harlow agreed: "In a Dream is a genuinely relatable album that reminds listeners that there can be beauty in pain, power in struggle and clarity in sadness."

Slant Magazine writer Sophia Ordaz was more mixed, saying "rather than significantly alter or challenge the singer’s previous approach, In a Dream merely embellishes it." However, she chose the track "Stud" as one of the best songs of 2020.

=== Year-end lists ===
Publication	Accolade	Rank	Ref.
ourculture	The 25 Best EPs of 2020	18	
Slant Magazine	The 50 Best Albums of 2020	31	

== Commercial performance ==
In a Dream performed moderately on the record charts. In Australia, the EP reached number three, becoming his fourth top 10 and second-highest-charting release, tied with Bloom (2018), only behind the Wild EP (2015), which topped the chart. On the US Billboard 200, the EP debuted at number 70, becoming his first charting release in the country to miss the top 10.

== Track listing ==
All tracks were produced by Oscar Görres, except for "Could Cry Just Thinkin About You", which was produced by Teo Halm.

In a Dream standard track listing
No.	Title	Writer(s)	Length
1.	"Take Yourself Home"	Troye Sivan; Brett McLaughlin; Tayla Parx; Oscar Görres	4:09
2.	"Easy"	Sivan; Görres	3:46
3.	"Could Cry Just Thinkin About You"	Sivan; Teo Halm	0:51
4.	"Stud"	Sivan; McLaughlin; James Alan Ghaleb; Görres	3:29
5.	"Rager Teenager!"	Sivan; McLaughlin; Görres	3:21
6.	"In a Dream"	Sivan; McLaughlin; Görres	3:49
Total length:			19:25

Standard CD bonus track
No.	Title	Writer(s)	Length
7.	"Easy" (voice memo)	Sivan; Görres	2:51
Total length:			22:16

US Target CD bonus tracks
No.	Title	Writer(s)	Length
7.	"Take Yourself Home" (acoustic)	Sivan; McLaughlin; Parx; Görres	2:58
8.	"Easy" (voice memo)	Sivan; Görres	2:51
Total length:			25:14

LP version
No.	Title	Writer(s)	Length
5.	"10/10"	Sivan; McLaughlin; Görres; Alan Ghaleb	3:08
6.	"Rager Teenager!"	Sivan; McLaughlin; Görres	3:21
7.	"In a Dream"	Sivan; McLaughlin; Görres	3:49
8.	"Easy" (voice memo)
9.	"Rager Teenager!" (voice memo)
10.	"In a Dream" (voice memo)

Digital reissue
No.	Title	Writer(s)	Length
1.	"Take Yourself Home"	Sivan; McLaughlin; Parx; Görres	4:09
2.	"Easy"	Sivan; Görres	3:46
3.	"Could Cry Just Thinkin About You"	Sivan; Halm	0:51
4.	"Stud"	Sivan; McLaughlin; Ghaleb; Görres	3:29
5.	"10/10"	Sivan; McLaughlin; Görres; Ghaleb	3:08
6.	"Rager Teenager!"	Sivan; McLaughlin; Görres	3:21
7.	"In a Dream"	Sivan; McLaughlin; Görres	3:49
Total length:			22:33

Notes

- "Could Cry Just Thinkin About You" is stylised in lowercase.
- "Stud" and "In a Dream" are both stylised in all caps.
- "Rager Teenager!" is stylised in sentence case.
- All voice memos are hidden tracks on the Target edition and LP version.

== Charts ==
Chart performance for In a Dream
Chart (2020)	Peak position
Australian Albums (ARIA)	3
Dutch Albums (Album Top 100)	48
German Albums (Offizielle Top 100)	43
New Zealand Albums (RMNZ)	27
Scottish Albums (Official Charts)	27
Spanish Albums (PROMUSICAE)	70
Swiss Albums (Schweizer Hitparade)	81
UK Albums (Official Charts)	34
US Billboard 200	70

== Release history ==
Release dates and formats for In a Dream
Region	Date	Format(s)	Edition(s)	Ref.
Various	21 August 2020	Digital download; CD; streaming	Standard	
United States	21 August 2020	CD	Target exclusive	
Various	9 October 2020	LP; cassette	Standard	
Various	30 October 2020	Digital download; streaming	Reissue	
Various	5 December 2025	LP	5th Anniversary Red and Blue swirl LP	
