= ILY (I Love You Baby) =

2019 single by Surf Mesa featuring Emilee Flood

Single by Surf Mesa featuring Emilee

from the EP Another Life
- Released: November 26, 2019
- Genre: Chillwave; tropical house
- Length: 2:56
- Label: Astralwerks; Universal
- Songwriters: Bob Gaudio; Bob Crewe; Powell Aguirre
- Producer: Surf Mesa

Surf Mesa singles chronology
"Taken Away" (2019)	"ILY (I Love You Baby)" (2019)	"Somewhere" (2020)

Emilee singles chronology
"Falling" (2019)	"ILY (I Love You Baby)" (2019)	"Seem to Be" (2019)

Music video
- "ILY (I Love You Baby)" on YouTube

"ILY (I Love You Baby)" (stylized in all lowercase), originally titled "ILY", is a song by American producer Surf Mesa featuring vocals by Emilee Flood, from the 2021 EP Another Life. It was first released on November 26, 2019. When the song was re-released through Astralwerks and Universal in February 2020, it started gaining popularity through user-generated clips on the app TikTok. The song has since topped the Romanian Airplay 100 chart. It further reached the top 10 in Austria, Germany, the Netherlands, Slovakia and Switzerland, as well as the top 40 in Australia, Belgium (Flanders and Wallonia), the Czech Republic, Denmark, Estonia, France, Ireland, Lithuania, New Zealand, and Norway. The song is a basic rendition of the chorus from the 1967 song "Can't Take My Eyes Off You" by Frankie Valli.

== Background and composition ==
Originally just titled "ILY", the song was renamed as "ILY (I Love You Baby)" to make it easier for people to find the song. ILY is a remix of a cover of the chorus from the Frankie Valli song, "Can't Take My Eyes Off You". Mike Wass of Idolator described the song as a "chorus on a loop over a dreamy synth-scape that falls somewhere between Petit Biscuit and Kasbo" and praised it as "the perfect soundtrack to any blissed-out moment". Hits Daily Double called the song "the heating-up club banger" version of the original.

In 2021, it was re-released digitally on the EP version of Another Life on streaming platforms.

== Charts ==
=== Weekly charts ===
2020–2022 weekly chart performance for "ILY (I Love You Baby)"
Chart (2020–2022)	Peak position
Australia (ARIA)	17
Austria (Ö3 Austria Top 40)	5
Belgium (Ultratop 50 Flanders)	11
Belgium (Ultratop 50 Wallonia)	20
Canada (Canadian Hot 100)	37
Czech Republic Singles Digital (ČNS IFPI)	22
Denmark (Tracklisten)	38
Estonia (Eesti Ekspress)	38
France (SNEP)	12
Germany (GfK)	7
Global 200 (Billboard)	56
Greece International (IFPI)	78
Hungary (Single Top 40)	17
Hungary (Stream Top 40)	19
Ireland (IRMA)	16
Italy (FIMI)	34
Lithuania (AGATA)	11
Malaysia (RIM)	7
Netherlands (Dutch Top 40)	9
Netherlands (Single Top 100)	5
New Zealand (RMNZ)	16
Norway (VG-lista)	14
Poland Airplay (ZPAV)	17
Portugal (AFP)	22
Romania (Airplay 100)	1
Russia Airplay (TopHit)	13
Scottish Singles Sales (Official Charts)	9
Singapore (RIAS)	10
Slovakia Airplay (ČNS IFPI)	1
Slovakia Singles Digital (ČNS IFPI)	15
Slovenia (SloTop50)	6
Spain (PROMUSICAE)	52
Sweden (Sverigetopplistan)	24
Switzerland (Schweizer Hitparade)	4
UK Singles (Official Charts)	22
Ukraine Airplay (TopHit)	24
US Billboard Hot 100	23
US Adult Contemporary (Billboard)	14
US Adult Top 40 (Billboard)	7
US Hot Dance/Electronic Songs (Billboard)	1
US Mainstream Top 40 (Billboard)	2

2026 weekly chart performance for "ILY (I Love You Baby)"
Chart (2026)	Peak position
Israel International Airplay (Media Forest)	17

=== Year-end charts ===
2020 year-end chart performance for "ILY (I Love You Baby)"
Chart (2020)	Position
Australia (ARIA)	75
Austria (Ö3 Austria Top 40)	19
Belgium (Ultratop Flanders)	53
Belgium (Ultratop Wallonia)	59
Canada (Canadian Hot 100)	97
France (SNEP)	48
Germany (Official German Charts)	22
Hungary (Single Top 40)	78
Hungary (Stream Top 40)	57
Netherlands (Dutch Top 40)	80
Netherlands (Single Top 100)	48
Poland (ZPAV)	91
Romania (Airplay 100)	19
Switzerland (Schweizer Hitparade)	20
Turkey (Radiomonitor International List)	17
US Billboard Hot 100	95
US Hot Dance/Electronic Songs (Billboard)	4
US Mainstream Top 40 (Billboard)	30

2021 year-end chart performance for "ILY (I Love You Baby)"
Chart (2021)	Position
US Adult Contemporary (Billboard)	38
US Adult Top 40 (Billboard)	35
US Hot Dance/Electronic Songs (Billboard)	4

== Certifications ==
Certifications and sales for "ILY (I Love You Baby)"
Region	Certification	Certified units/sales
Australia (ARIA)	Platinum	70,000^{‡}
Belgium (BRMA)	Platinum	40,000^{‡}
Brazil (Pro-Música Brasil)	Diamond	160,000^{‡}
Canada (Music Canada)	4× Platinum	320,000^{‡}
Denmark (IFPI Danmark)	Gold	45,000^{‡}
France (SNEP)	Diamond	333,333^{‡}
Germany (BVMI)	Platinum	400,000^{‡}
Italy (FIMI)	Platinum	70,000^{‡}
New Zealand (RMNZ)	2× Platinum	60,000^{‡}
Poland (ZPAV)	3× Platinum	150,000^{‡}
Portugal (AFP)	Platinum	10,000^{‡}
Spain (Promusicae)	Platinum	60,000^{‡}
Switzerland (IFPI Switzerland)	2× Platinum	40,000^{‡}
United Kingdom (BPI)	Platinum	600,000^{‡}
United States (RIAA)	2× Platinum	2,000,000^{‡}
^{‡} Sales+streaming figures based on certification alone.

== See also ==
- List of Airplay 100 number ones of the 2020s
