= You (Regard, Troye Sivan and Tate McRae song) =

2021 single by Regard, Troye Sivan and Tate McRae

Single by Regard, Troye Sivan and Tate McRae
- Released: 16 April 2021
- Recorded: 2020
- Genre: Dance-pop; electropop; synth-pop
- Length: 3:53
- Label: Ministry of Sound
- Songwriters: Regard; Troye Sivan; Tate McRae; Frederik Castenschiold Eichen; Koda; Sakima; Tom Mann
- Producer: Regard

Regard singles chronology
"Say My Name" (2020)	"You" (2021)	"Signals" (2021)

Troye Sivan singles chronology
"Easy" (2020)	"You" (2021)	"Could Cry Just Thinkin About You" (2021)

Tate McRae singles chronology
"Bad Ones" (2021)	"You" (2021)	"U Love U" (2021)

Music video
- "You" on YouTube

"You" is a song by Kosovo-Albanian disc jockey Regard, Australian singer Troye Sivan and Canadian singer Tate McRae. It was written by the performers along with Frederik Castenschiold Eichen, Koda, Sakima and Tom Mann, and produced by Regard. Marking the first collaboration between the artists, the song was released as a single for digital download and streaming by Ministry of Sound on 16 April 2021. It is an '80s-inspired English-language dance-pop,electropop and synth-pop song, blending deep house and retro-pop influences. Focused on heartbreak, the song is about the difficulties over a failed relationship and how hard it is to move on from someone you love. The song received positive reviews from music critics, who highlighted its music and lyrics as well as Regard's production and Sivan and McRae's vocal delivery.

"You" entered the top 50 in several countries, among others in Canada, Ireland, Lithuania, the Netherlands, Singapore, and the United Kingdom. It further peaked at number 58 on the US Billboard Hot 100 and number one on the Dance/Electronic Songs chart (the first for all three artists), as well as number 38 on the Canadian Hot 100. The song attained a gold certification by the Recording Industry Association of America (RIAA) in the United States and a silver certification by the British Phonographic Industry (BPI) in the UK. The accompanying music video was uploaded to Regard's YouTube channel on 27 May 2021, featuring scenes filmed in Australia, Kosovo and the US. In 2022, the song received a nomination for the Top Dance/Electronic Song at the Billboard Music Awards and for the Dance Song of the Year at the iHeartRadio Music Awards.

== Background and composition ==
Ministry of Sound released "You" as a single for digital download and streaming in various countries on 16 April 2021. Leading up to its release, Troye Sivan and Tate McRae teased "You" on their respective TikTok accounts by posting snippets and singing along to it, with Regard also uploading a 30-second teaser on his YouTube channel on 31 March 2021. Marking the first collaboration between the artists, McRae elaborated, "Collaborating with Troye and Regard was an amazing experience. It's a totally different vibe than any of my usual songs, but still has the emotional and lyrical depth that I always try to write". The song was written by Regard, Sivan and McRae along with Frederik Castenschiold Eichen, Koda, Sakima and Tom Mann, and produced by Regard. "You" is an English-language '80s-inspired dance-pop and electro-pop song, with a synth-pop sound and a deep house hook, while fusing electronic and retro-pop elements in its chorus. Touching on the theme of heartbreak, Sivan and McRae sing about the difficulties over a failed relationship and how hard it is to move on from someone you love and get off your mind. On the chorus, they sing, "When I try to fall back, I fall back to you / When I talk to my friends, I talk about you / When the Hennessy's strong, all I see is you".

== Reception ==
Viewing it as an "anthem", a writer for Radio Luz highlighted the song's "sophisticated, euphoric and effortless" sound as well as Sivan and McRae's vocal interaction that, according to him, creates an "aesthetic" atmosphere. For L'Officiel, Mina Dragani dubbed it as "catchy", employing "breathy" vocals from the singers and an "expert" mixing from Regard. On a similar note, Philip Logan for CelebMix declared the song "sexy", appreciating the "sultry and flirtatious" lyrics as well as their "glorious and silky smooth" voices. Writing for his website, Thomas Bleach called the song an "infatuation" and summer anthem that "you're going to want to hear over and over again". He further opined that "['You'] is [a] great definition of what a collaboration should be [with] each artist fusing their artistries together and finding a new medium to co-exist within".

In the United Kingdom, "You" reached number 46 on the UK Singles Chart issue dated 24 June 2021 and received a silver certification by the British Phonographic Industry (BPI) for selling 200,000 units in the country. The song was largely fueled by airplay in the United States, entering the Billboard Hot 100 at number 100 and peaking at number 58 on the chart issue dated 7 August 2021. The song also peaked atop the Dance/Electronic Songs and reached number 11 on the Mainstream Top 40 and number 24 on the Adult Top 40 rankings. The song further received a gold certification by the Recording Industry Association of America (RIAA) for selling more than 500,000 certified units in the US. Elsewhere, "You" reached the top 50 in Canada, the Czech Republic, Hungary, Ireland, Lithuania, the Netherlands, and Singapore, as well as the top 100 in Australia, Croatia, Slovakia and Sweden. In 2022, the song received a nomination for the Top Dance/Electronic Song at the Billboard Music Awards as well as for the Dance Song of the Year at the iHeartRadio Music Awards.

== Promotion ==
Preceded by the release of a lyric video on 16 April 2021, the music video for "You" was uploaded to Regard's official YouTube channel on 27 May. An acoustic video of the song was published on the aforementioned platform on 11 June. Behind-the-scenes footage from the music video followed three days later. In the video, a young woman deepfakes her face onto McRae and transforms into a computer hacker, successfully hijacking the system and taking control. In another scene, she appears in an apartment, which is surrounded by computer monitors, while watching the unreleased footage. Following this, she pieces together clips of Sivan, whose face is covered with gemstones, with her dancing around with a teddy bear in her arms and cutting her own face out of a polaroid picture and then set it on fire. Regarding the process of filming the video, Sivan stated, "We've shot everything from TV performances to this video in three different continents. Tate was in LA, I was in Melbourne [and] Regard was in Kosovo. We made it work, and this idea takes the limitations and stretches them into inspiration for a really cool idea".

For further promotion, Regard, Sivan and McRae provided several live performances of "You" throughout 2021. The trio performed "You" for the first time on the seventh season of the American talk show The Tonight Show Starring Jimmy Fallon on 20 May 2021. The show featured them performing the song in a setting with dark lights and neon accents, with the song's title projected behind them. They also performed the song virtually for the 2021 edition of iHeartRadio's concert series Can't Cancel Pride on 4 June. McRae and Sivan provided another performance of it ahead of the 2021 edition of MTV Video Music Awards at the PUSH to the VMAs concert on 9 September. Regard further played a remix version of the song at the 2021 SAGA Festival in the same month.

== Track listing ==
- Digital download and streaming
1. "You" – 3:53
- Digital download and streaming – acoustic
1. "You" – 3:34
- Digital download and streaming – remixes
1. "You" (KC Lights remix) – 3:11
2. "You" (Topic remix) – 2:27

== Credits and personnel ==
Credits adapted from Spotify.

Vocal credits

- Tate McRae – lead artist
- Troye Sivan – lead artist

Technical credits

- Regard – lead artist, producing, songwriting
- Tate McRae – songwriting
- Troye Sivan – songwriting
- Frederik Castenschiold Eichen – songwriting
- Koda – songwriting
- Sakima – songwriting
- Tom Mann – songwriting

== Charts ==
=== Weekly charts ===
Weekly chart performance for "You"
Chart (2021)	Peak position
Australia (ARIA)	51
Australian Dance (ARIA)	8
Belgium (Ultratop 50 Flanders)	50
Canada Hot 100 (Billboard)	38
Canada CHR/Top 40 (Billboard)	10
Canada Hot AC (Billboard)	25
Croatia (HRT)	58
Czech Republic Airplay (ČNS IFPI)	38
Global 200 (Billboard)	113
Hungary (Rádiós Top 40)	31
Ireland (IRMA)	50
Lithuania (AGATA)	43
Netherlands (Dutch Top 40)	17
Netherlands (Single Top 100)	30
New Zealand Hot Singles (RMNZ)	3
Singapore (RIAS)	25
Slovakia Airplay (ČNS IFPI)	58
Sweden (Sverigetopplistan)	68
UK Singles (Official Charts)	46
UK Dance (Official Charts)	17
US Billboard Hot 100	58
US Adult Pop Airplay (Billboard)	24
US Hot Dance/Electronic Songs (Billboard)	1
US Pop Airplay (Billboard)	11

=== Year-end charts ===
Year-end performance for "You"
Chart (2021)	Peak position
Australian Dance (ARIA)	40
Canada (Canadian Hot 100)	90
Netherlands (Dutch Top 40)	81
US Hot Dance/Electronic Songs (Billboard)	6
US Mainstream Top 40 (Billboard)	41

== Certifications ==
Certifications and sales for "You"
Region	Certification	Certified units/sales
Canada (Music Canada)	2× Platinum	160,000^{‡}
Denmark (IFPI Danmark)	Gold	45,000^{‡}
Italy (FIMI)	Gold	50,000^{‡}
New Zealand (RMNZ)	Gold	15,000^{‡}
Poland (ZPAV)	Gold	25,000^{‡}
United Kingdom (BPI)	Silver	200,000^{‡}
United States (RIAA)	Platinum	1,000,000^{‡}
^{‡} Sales+streaming figures based on certification alone.

== Release history ==
Release dates and formats for "You"
Region	Date	Format(s)	Label	Ref.
Various	16 April 2021	Digital download; streaming	Ministry of Sound	
United States	20 April 2021	Contemporary hit radio	Epic	
Italy	23 April 2021	Radio airplay	Sony	

== See also ==
- List of Billboard number-one dance songs of 2021
