= Surf Mesa =

American electronic musician (born 2000)

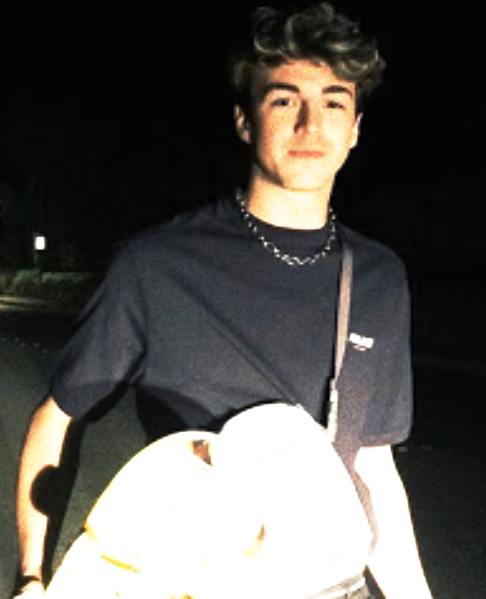
- Aguirre in 2020

Background information
- Born: Powell Aguirre; April 10, 2000 (age 26); Sammamish, Washington, U.S.
- Genres: Electronic
- Occupation: Musician
- Years active: 2019–present
- Labels: Astralwerks; Universal

Powell Aguirre (born April 10, 2000), known by the stage name Surf Mesa, is an American electronic musician from Seattle. He gained fame for the single "ILY (I Love You Baby)" (2019), a song which sampled a cover of Frankie Valli's "Can't Take My Eyes Off You" (1967) and gained popularity on TikTok.

== Biography ==
Aguirre was born in Sammamish, Washington and is the son of jazz saxophonist Tony Aguirre. He has been making music since the third grade of elementary school, first learning through FL Studio and production tutorials on YouTube. He began working on the Surf Mesa project in high school, releasing music on SoundCloud. His stage name was chosen based on the Counter-Strike map of the same name. As Aguirre was planning a move to Arizona to study computer science at a technology school, he broke his leg and was bed-bound for three months. During this time, Aguirre was able to focus fully on producing music.

Aguirre decided to move to Los Angeles after visiting a girl he was interested in, as he realized the opportunities for musicians in the city. In 2019, Aguirre released his debut single "Taken Away" featuring Alexa Danielle, and his debut four-song extended play Bedroom. In November, Aguirre released "ILY (I Love You Baby)", a song based on singer Emilee's cover of "Can't Take My Eyes Off You". The song gained massive popularity on video platform TikTok, leading to Aguirre being signed by Astralwerks and Universal. By June 2020, the song had become an international hit, reaching the top 10 in Austria, Germany, Switzerland, Scotland, the Netherlands, Malaysia and Singapore, and the top 5 of the Billboard Hot Dance/Electronic Songs chart.

In June 2020, Aguirre released an official remix for American electronic musician Marshmello and American singer Halsey's "Be Kind".

== Discography ==
=== Extended plays ===
- bedroom (2019)
- Come True (2023)

=== Singles ===
List of singles, with selected chart positions and certifications shown
Title	Year	Peak chart positions										Certifications	Album
Title	Year	US	AUS	AUT	CAN	FRA	GER	ITA	NLD	NZ	UK	Certifications	Album
"Taken Away" (featuring Alexa Danielle)	2019	—	—	—	—	—	—	—	—	—	—		Non-album singles
"ILY (I Love You Baby)" (featuring Emilee)	2019	23	17	5	37	12	7	34	5	16	22	RIAA: 2× Platinum; ARIA: Platinum; BPI: Platinum; BVMI: Platinum; FIMI: Platinum; MC: 4× Platinum; RMNZ: 2× Platinum; SNEP: Diamond	Non-album singles
"Somewhere" (featuring Gus Dapperton)	2020	—	—	—	—	—	—	—	—	—	—		Non-album singles
"Carried Away" (with Madison Beer)	2021	—	—	—	—	—	—	—	—	— (Note: "Carried Away" did not enter the NZ Top 40 Singles Chart, but peaked at number 14 on the NZ Hot Singles Chart.)	—		Non-album singles
"Lose My Mind" (featuring Bipolar Sunshine)	2021	—	—	—	—	—	—	—	—	—	—		Non-album singles
"Another Life" (featuring Fletcher and Josh Golden)	2021	—	—	—	—	—	—	—	—	—	—		Non-album singles
"—" denotes releases that did not chart in this region.

=== Remixes ===
Title	Year	Other artists	Album
"Sleeper (Surf Mesa Remix)"	2019	Subtoll	—N/a
"Be Kind (Surf Mesa Remix)"	2020	Marshmello, Halsey	—N/a
"Wonder (Surf Mesa Remix)"	2020	Shawn Mendes	Wonder (Deluxe)
