= Sweat (tour) =

2024 tour by Charli XCX and Troye Sivan

- Tour by Charli XCX and Troye Sivan
- Promotional poster
- Location: Canada; United States; Spain
- Associated albums: Brat; Something to Give Each Other
- Start date: 14 September 2024
- End date: 5 June 2025
- No. of shows: 23
- Supporting act: Shygirl
- Website: www.sweat-tour.com

Charli XCX tour chronology
- Crash: The Live Tour (2022–2023); Sweat (2024); Brat Tour (2024–2025)
Troye Sivan tour chronology
| Something to Give Each Other Tour (2024) | Sweat (2024) |

Sweat was a co-headlining concert tour by British singer-songwriter Charli XCX and Australian singer-songwriter Troye Sivan, in support of their albums Brat (2024) and Something to Give Each Other (2023), respectively. The tour began on 14 September 2024, in Detroit, Michigan, and concluded on 23 October 2024, in Seattle, Washington. English singer and DJ Shygirl served as the opening act. An exclusive European date was added when the duo headlined Primavera Sound 2025 on 5 June 2025. The tour had many notable guests, including Lorde, Addison Rae, Kesha and Tate McRae.

== Background ==
Charli XCX and Troye Sivan first collaborated in 2018 with their song "1999". Due to the song's popularity, the duo would collaborate further, releasing "2099" the following year.

Sivan released his third studio album, Something to Give Each Other, on 13 October 2023, while Charli XCX released her sixth studio album Brat on 7 June 2024. In the summer of 2024, both artists embarked on separate tours in support of the albums. On 17 April 2024, the duo announced Sweat, a joint tour of North America.

On December 27, 2024, the tour's first show at the KIA Forum just outside Los Angeles became available for free on Meta's Meta Horizon Worlds' Music Valley platform, both as a VR experience on Meta Quest devices and in a more traditional experience on browsers and the desktop and mobile apps of Horizon Worlds.

In October 2024, Primavera Sound released the lineup for their 2025 festival featuring headliners Chappell Roan, Charli XCX and Sabrina Carpenter, which Charli labeled the "holy trinity". In December, Charli announced that Sivan would accompany her for the exclusive European date of their joint Sweat tour, which coincidentally took place on Sivan's 30th birthday.

== Set list ==
The following set list is obtained from the 14 September 2024 show in Detroit. It is not intended to represent all dates throughout the tour.

1. "Got Me Started" (Sivan)
2. "What's the Time Where You Are?" (Sivan)
3. "My My My!" (Sivan)
4. "365" (remix) (Charli XCX & Shygirl)
5. "360" (Charli XCX)
6. "Von Dutch" (Charli XCX)
7. "In My Room" (Sivan)
8. "Dance to This" (Sivan)
9. "Rager Teenager!" (Sivan)
10. "Club Classics" (Charli XCX)
11. "Unlock It" (Charli XCX)
12. "Sympathy Is a Knife" (Charli XCX)
13. "Guess" (remix) (Charli XCX)
14. "Bloom" (Sivan)
15. "Boys" (Charli XCX)
16. "Girl, So Confusing" (remix) (Charli XCX)
17. "One of Your Girls" (Sivan)
18. "Everything Is Romantic" (Charli XCX)
19. "Speed Drive" (Charli XCX)
20. "Apple" (Charli XCX)
21. "Silly" (Sivan)
22. "You" (Sivan)
23. "Stud" (Sivan)
24. "365" (Charli XCX)
25. "Vroom Vroom" (Charli XCX)
26. "1999" (Charli XCX & Sivan)
27. "Track 10" (Charli XCX)
28. "I Love It" (Charli XCX)
29. "Honey" (Sivan)
30. "Rush" (Sivan)

Encore

31. "Talk Talk" (remix) (Charli XCX & Sivan)

=== Alterations ===
- "Spring Breakers" replaced "Boys" starting from the Montreal show.
- During the show in New York City, Addison Rae joined Charli and Troye onstage to perform "Diet Pepsi" and to perform her verse on the "Von Dutch" remix. Lorde joined Charli onstage to perform her verse on the "Girl, So Confusing" remix.
- During the first show in Inglewood, Kesha joined Charli onstage to perform "Tik Tok" and her verse on the "Spring Breakers" remix. Tate McRae joined Sivan to perform her verse on "You".
- During the second show in Inglewood, Vinnie Hacker joined Troye onstage to perform "One of Your Girls".
- During the show in San Francisco, Saweetie joined Shygirl on stage to perform "Immaculate".

== Tour dates ==
List of 2024 concerts
| Date (2024) | City | Country | Venue |
|---|---|---|---|
| 14 September | Detroit | United States | Little Caesars Arena |
| 16 September | Laval (Note: Labeled as Montreal in promotional material.) | Canada | Place Bell |
| 18 September | Toronto | Canada | Scotiabank Arena |
| 20 September | Columbus | United States | Nationwide Arena |
| 23 September | New York City | United States | Madison Square Garden |
| 25 September | Philadelphia | United States | Wells Fargo Center |
| 26 September | Baltimore | United States | CFG Bank Arena |
| 28 September | Boston | United States | TD Garden |
| 30 September | Chicago | United States | United Center |
| 2 October | Nashville | United States | Bridgestone Arena |
| 3 October | Atlanta | United States | State Farm Arena |
| 5 October | Miami | United States | Kaseya Center |
| 6 October | Orlando | United States | Kia Center |
| 9 October | Dallas | United States | American Airlines Center |
| 11 October | Denver | United States | Ball Arena |
| 13 October | Phoenix | United States | Footprint Center |
| 15 October | Inglewood (Note: Labeled as Los Angeles in promotional material.) | United States | Kia Forum |
| 16 October | Inglewood | United States | Kia Forum |
| 18 October | San Diego | United States | Viejas Arena |
| 20 October | San Francisco | United States | Chase Center |
| 22 October | Portland | United States | Moda Center |
| 23 October | Seattle | United States | Climate Pledge Arena |

=== Festival run ===
List of concerts
| Date (2025) | City | Country | Venue |
|---|---|---|---|
| 5 June (Note: The concert on 5 June 2025 at the Parc del Fòrum in Barcelona is part of Primavera Sound 2025.) | Barcelona | Spain | Parc del Fòrum |
