= Primavera Sound 2025 =

Music festival in Barcelona, Spain

- Genre: Pop
- Dates: 5 June 2025 – 7 June 2025
- Locations: Parc del Fòrum, Barcelona (Catalonia, Spain)
- Coordinates: 41°24′40.75″N 2°13′28.57″E
- Founders: Pablo Soler, Gabriel Ruiz, Sonia Saura
- Previous event: Primavera Sound 2024
- Next event: Primavera Sound 2026
- Attendance: 293,000
- Capacity: 75,000
- Website: www.primaverasound.com

Primavera Sound 2025 was a music festival that took place from 5 to 7 June 2025 at the Parc del Fòrum in Barcelona, Spain. It was the 23rd edition of the festival, and was headlined by Charli XCX & Troye Sivan (in the only European date of their joint Sweat tour), Sabrina Carpenter and Chappell Roan.

Attendance for the festival was 293,000, a franchise record for a single-week edition of Primavera Sound. All tickets atypically sold out by January, the first time it had done so for a single-week edition since 2016. Featuring 311 total performances, the festival generated over €300 million in revenue for the city of Barcelona.

== Background ==
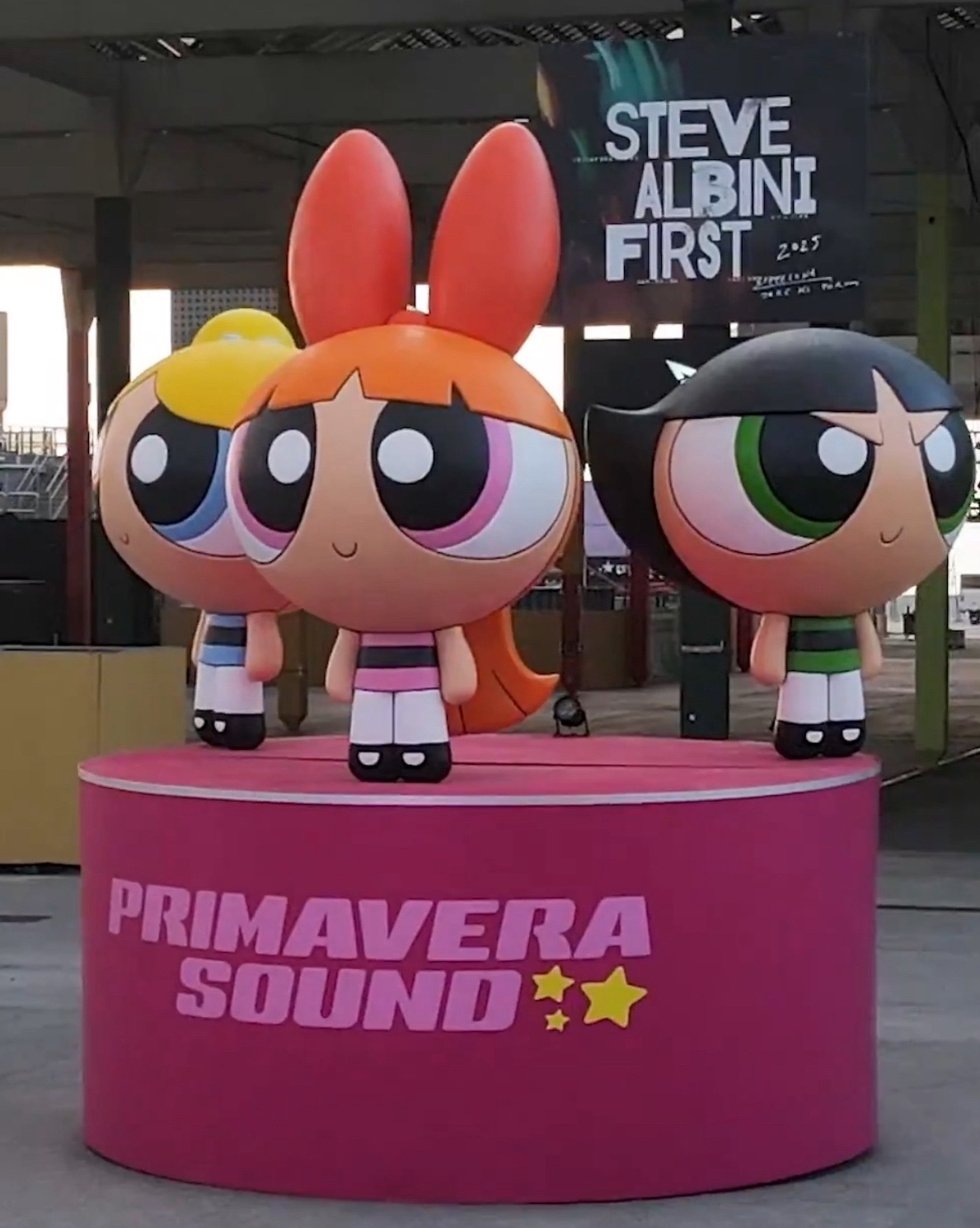
The Powerpuff Girls statue at the entrance

On 24 October 2024, Primavera Sound announced the initial lineup for the festival's 2025 edition, featuring three female pop stars as headliners: Charli XCX, Sabrina Carpenter and Chappell Roan. Charli declared that the trio were the "holy trinity", and the festival said: "The fact of having three female artists headlining a festival like this is especially symbolic if we consider that they also lead an artistic line-up that is gender-balanced. This has been the hallmark of Primavera Sound since the unforgettable 2019 edition, which for the first time balanced a historically uneven scale. This closes, finally." Tom Breihan wrote for Stereogum that Primavera "booked all three main characters from 2024’s pop girl summer as headliners". The trio were dubbed "Primavera Powerpuff Girls", with the entrance of the festival featuring large inflatable versions of Blossom, Bubbles, and Buttercup.

Less than 24 hours after the initial lineup announcement, Central Cee was added as an "additional headliner", although he was not given headliner status on the poster.

In December, Charli announced that Troye Sivan would accompany her for the exclusive European date of their joint Sweat tour, which coincidentally took place on Sivan's 30th birthday.

The festival also announced a new LCD Soundsystem album in 2025 along with their appearance, though recanted that claim a day later. On 20 November 2024, the festival sold out its weekend tickets for the first time in a regular edition since 2016. All overall tickets were sold out by 2 January 2025.

On 5 February 2025, the lineup for the Primavera a la Ciutat programme was revealed. It featured artists not on the main lineup such as Nilüfer Yanya, Kneecap and Pete Doherty, as well as smaller settings for festival artists like Beach House, The Jesus Lizard and Kim Deal.

On 30 April 2025, Primavera Sound announced that the Auditori was booked for a private event during the same time as the festival, so all sets that were previously scheduled for the building were moved to Sala Apolo and Paral-lel 62. This included artists such as Destroyer, Cat Power, Julie Byrne and Kali Malone.

On 9 May 2025, Clairo cancelled her appearance at the festival, citing "logistical issues with getting [her] show to/from Primavera". On 16 May, Wolf Alice were named as her replacement.

== Festival ==
Caribou headlined the festival's free Wednesday "Jornada Inaugural" show at the Amazon Music stage of the Parc del Fòrum, which was attended by roughly 30,000 people.

Charli XCX & Troye Sivan, in the sole European date of their joint Sweat tour, headlined the first night on 5 June, which coincidentally took place on Sivan's 30th birthday. Fellow headliner Chappell Roan showed up as a surprise guest from a nearby balcony to perform the viral "Apple" dance, which was streamed onto the big screens on the main stage. Earlier that day on the main stage, FKA Twigs performed after cancelling her scheduled appearances for both of the 2023 and 2024 editions of the festival.

Sabrina Carpenter headlined the second night on 6 June, where she performed her new single "Manchild" live for the first time and also covered "It's Raining Men" by The Weather Girls.

Chappell Roan headlined the third and final night on 7 June. She covered Heart's "Barracuda" and also read aloud fan-submitted stories about the flaws of their ex-partners during a performance of "The Giver".

Kevin Parker performed a surprise DJ set as "DJ Kevin" at the Cupra Pulse stage on 6 June, and on 7 June at the Nitsa Club in Barcelona, he previewed a new Tame Impala song during his set, later revealed to be titled "End of Summer".

During Fontaines D.C.'s main stage performance on 7 June, the band displayed a Palestinian flag on their screen as well as the phrases "Free Palestine" and "Israel is committing genocide – use your voice" during their performance of the song "I Love You". Idles also led a "Viva Palestina" chant during their main stage set on 5 June, while bands on smaller stages such as Chat Pile also expressed support.

At the entrance of the festival, an installation titled "Unsilence Gaza" featured a tunnel which simulated the sound of bombings in the Gaza Strip. The outside of the exhibit featured the phrase "When everything blows up, don’t hide in the silence." Schwarzkopf Professional sponsored a stage and offered a pop-up salon near the stage that offered hairstyling services and product sampling.

== Line-up ==
Headline acts are listed in bold.

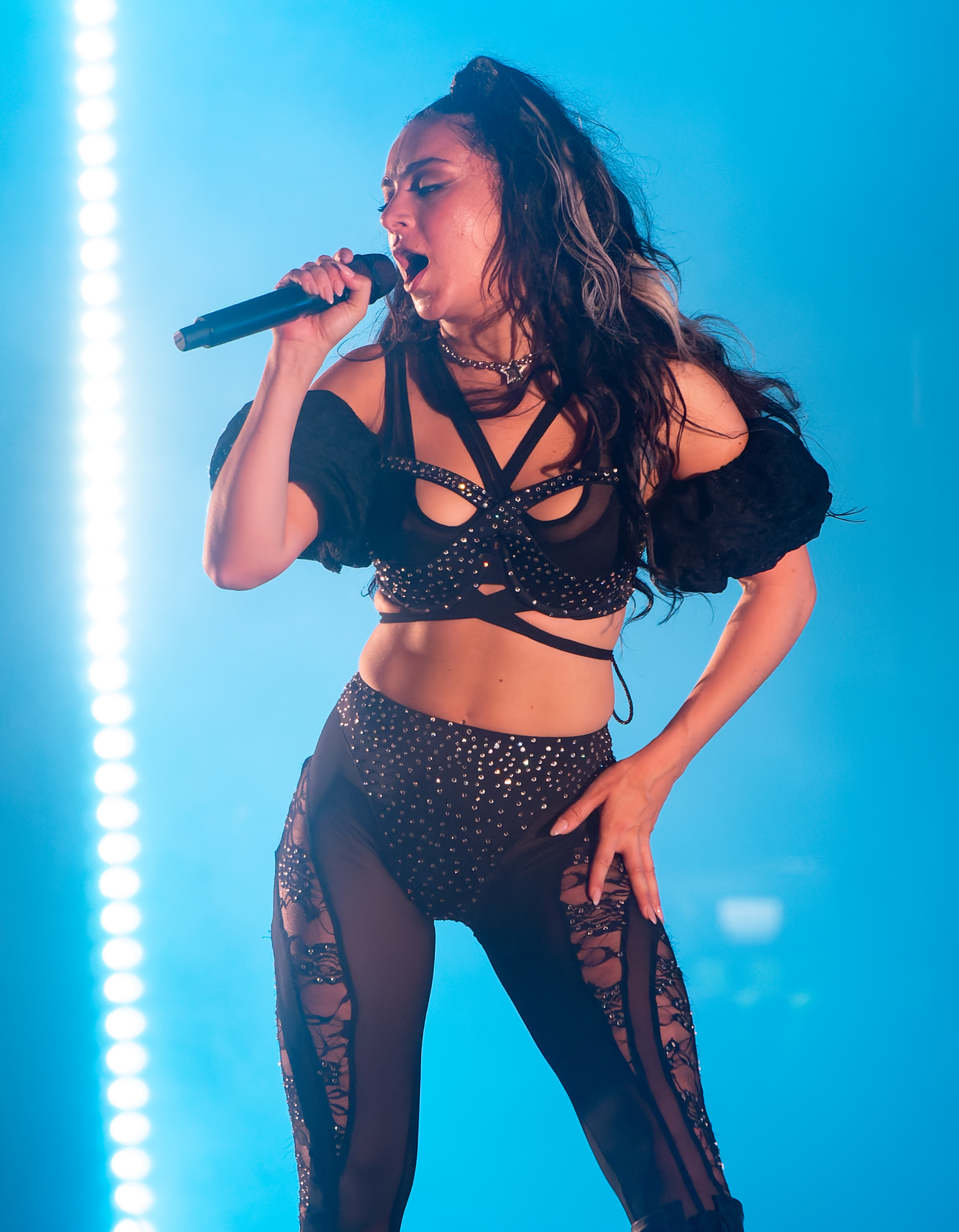
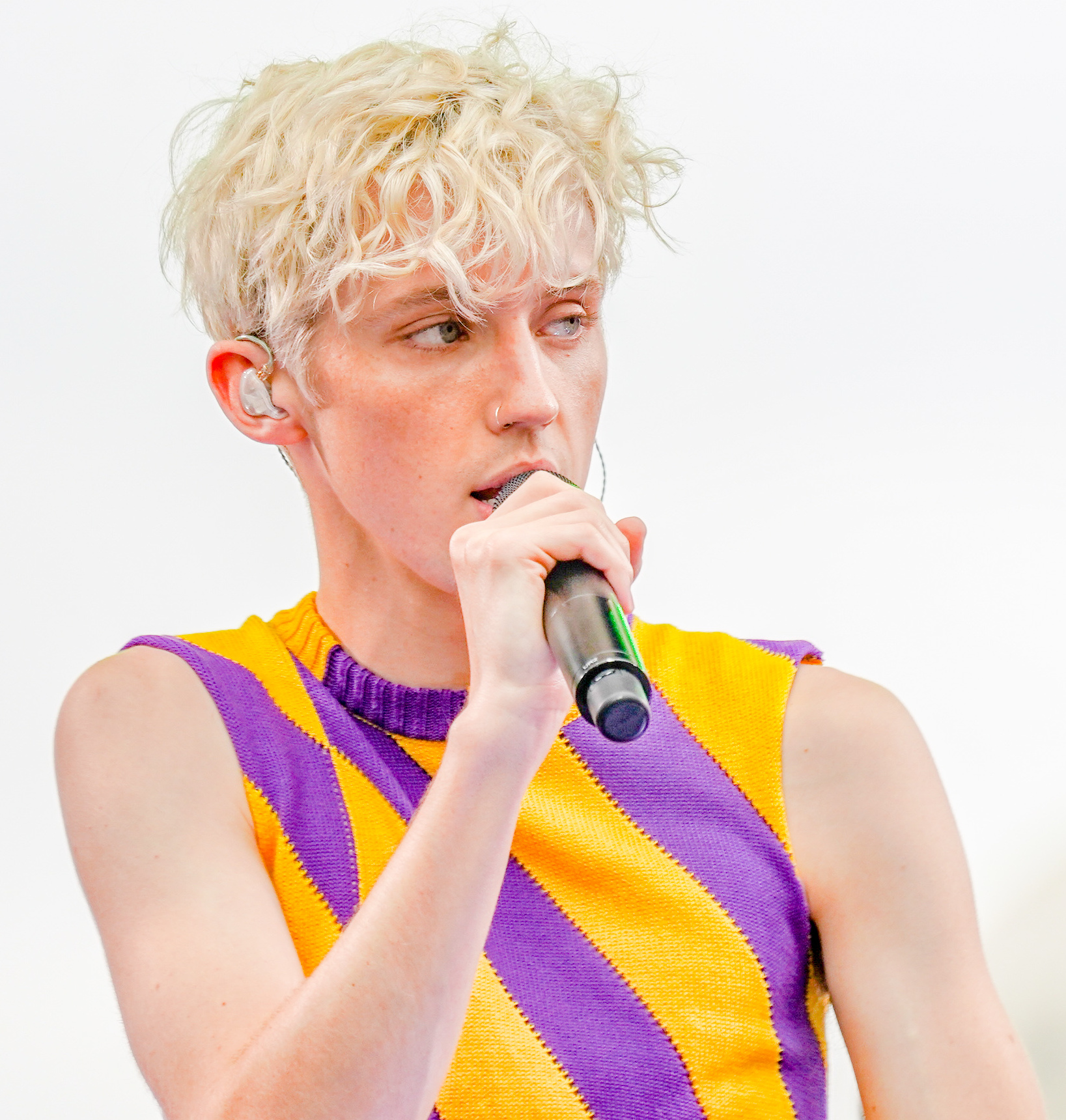
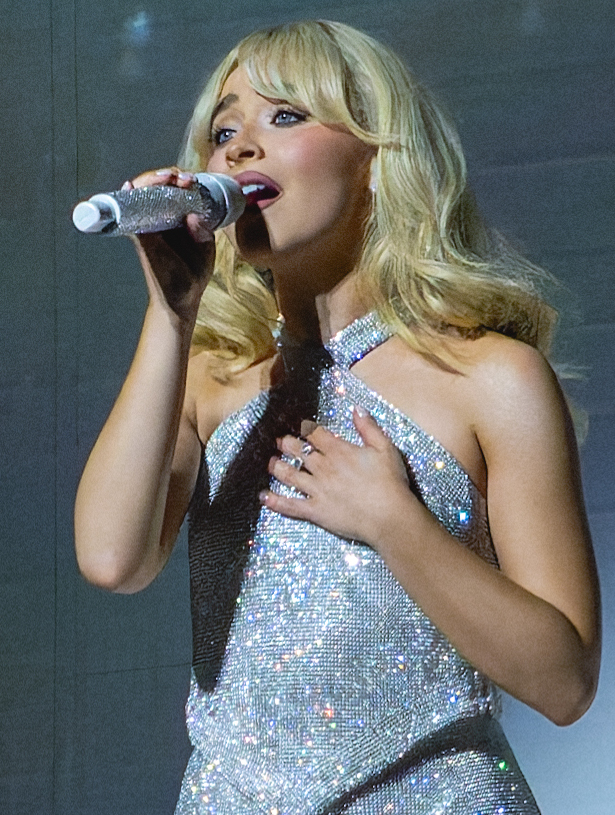
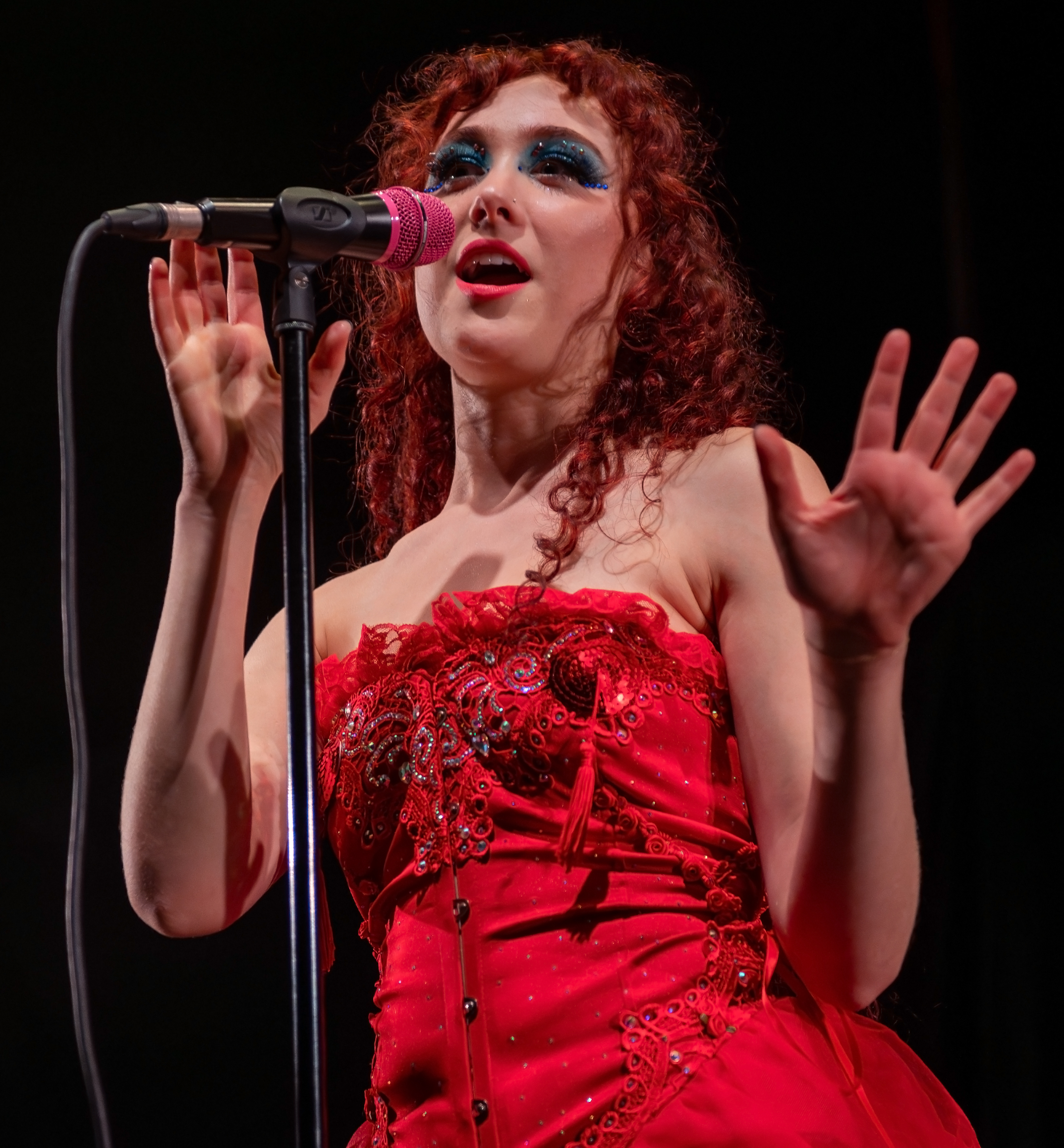
Primavera Sound headliners Charli XCX & Troye Sivan, Sabrina Carpenter, and Chappell Roan.

=== Estrella Damm ===
Thursday, 5 June 2025	Friday, 6 June 2025	Saturday, 7 June 2025
**Charli XCX & Troye Sivan**; FKA Twigs; Beabadoobee; AMORE	ANOTR; Beach House; Wolf Alice; Feeble Little Horse	**Chappell Roan**; Glass Beams; Judeline

=== Revolut ===
Thursday, 5 June 2025	Friday, 6 June 2025	Saturday, 7 June 2025
Jamie xx; Idles; Kate Bollinger	**Sabrina Carpenter**; Haim; Yoasobi	LCD Soundsystem; Central Cee; Fontaines D.C.; Kim Deal

=== Amazon Music ===
Thursday, 5 June 2025	Friday, 6 June 2025	Saturday, 7 June 2025
Brutalismus 3000; Parcels; Magdalena Bay; Cassandra Jenkins; Yawners	Floating Points; Carolina Durante; Stereolab; The Hard Quartet; Soluna	Turnstile; Confidence Man; Anohni and the Johnsons; Black Country, New Road; Kokoscha

=== Cupra ===
Thursday, 5 June 2025	Friday, 6 June 2025	Saturday, 7 June 2025
Armand van Helden; Denzel Curry; Spiritualized; CMAT; Ciutat	Amelie Lens; Wet Leg; TV on the Radio; Zaho de Sagazan; Waxahatchee; Amor Líquido	Danny L Harle; Aminé; MJ Lenderman; Amaia; Christian Lee Hutson; Xenia

=== Schwarzkopf ===
Thursday, 5 June 2025	Friday, 6 June 2025	Saturday, 7 June 2025
The Dare; The Sabres of Paradise; Kelly Lee Owens; This Is Lorelei; Nourished by Time; Frente Abierto featuring Israel Fernández and Lela Soto; Ultralágrima	Danny L Harle (Live); Salem; The Jesus Lizard; Chanel Beads; Florence Sinclair; Tramhaus; Heal	Sandwell District; Yung Beef; Machine Girl; Squid; Los Campesinos!; Dehd; Euskoprincess

=== Trainline ===
Thursday, 5 June 2025	Friday, 6 June 2025	Saturday, 7 June 2025
Dame Area; Been Stellar; Midnight; Momma; julie; Sistema de Entretenimiento	4am Kru; High Vis; Fcukers; Gouge Away; Still House Plants; Tetas Frías	Frost Children; Chat Pile; Cap'n Jazz; Alan Sparhawk; Horsegirl; Restinga

=== The Levi's Warehouse ===
Thursday, 5 June 2025	Friday, 6 June 2025	Saturday, 7 June 2025
Djrum; Aunty Rayzor & DJ Tobzy; CRYSTALLMESS (Live); oma totem (Live); Barker; Heinali & Andriana-Yaroslava Saienko	Jehia; Sideproject; Simo Cell; Shabjdeed & Al Nather; Cinna Peyghamy; Jules Reidy	DJ Masda; D'Arcangelo (Live); Mad Miran B2B John Talabot (ADHDJ's); Diamin; Jonathan Fitoussi (Live); Beatrice Dillon (Live)

=== Plenitude by Nitsa ===
Thursday, 5 June 2025	Friday, 6 June 2025	Saturday, 7 June 2025
Jane Fitz; John Talabot B2B DJ Dustin; Kia; DJ Koze; DJ Python; Sugar Free; Lumiere	Mala Junta: D. Dan / DJ Tool / Hyperaktivist / Yazzus; Miss Bashful × DBBD; Kittin; Mor Elian B2B Alarico; Ogazon; Shed (Live); Kinetic	Sherelle; Joy Orbison; RHR; Nicola Cruz (Live); INVT (Live); Nick León; Isabella Lovestory; LANAV

=== Cupra Pulse ===
Thursday, 5 June 2025	Friday, 6 June 2025	Saturday, 7 June 2025
Big Ang; DJ Playero; Mia Koden; Ehua; Piezo; Mimosa; DJ Caio Prince; Crystallmess; The Dare (DJ set); Fcukers (DJ set); Eera; Carolina	Making Time XXV: aya (DJ set); Making Time XXV: Dave P B2B Elena Colombi Electroclash Set; Spencer Nmbrs; Frost Children (DJ set); Lolahol (DJ set); DJ Chaotic Ugly (Machine Girl); Tommy Wright III; La Chat (Live); Tame Impala (DJ set); DJ Playero; Bushbby	Francesco Del Garda B2B James Zabiela; LSDXOXO (Live); SITA; Marcelo Pantani; Confidence Man (DJ Set); Dazegxd; Shaun D; Rozaly; Miramizu

=== Sala Apollo ===
Friday, 6 June 2025	Saturday, 7 June 2025
Julie Byrne; Milan W	Salif Keita; Maria Somerville

=== Paral·lel 62 ===
Thursday, 5 June 2025	Friday, 6 June 2025	Saturday, 7 June 2025
Moritz von Oswald: Silencio; Kali Malone	Cat Power sings Dylan; Red Stamp	Destroyer; Música Esporádica

=== Aperol Island of Joy ===
Thursday, 5 June 2025	Friday, 6 June 2025	Saturday, 7 June 2025
Toldos Verdes; Ona Mafalda; Aiko el grupo; Frytz	Dora; Anaïs; Maria Blaya; Fades	The Crab Apples; Maig; Raya Diplomática; Pavlenha

=== Barcelona Sona by Estrella Damm ===
Thursday, 5 June 2025	Friday, 6 June 2025	Saturday, 7 June 2025
Memory Palace; CobraBubble; Klara Missyle	Isa Enes; La Niña Jacarandá; loveang3lmusicbaby	Ga.dea; KINÉTICA; Gigi Morralla

=== Revolut Club ===
Thursday, 5 June 2025	Friday, 6 June 2025	Saturday, 7 June 2025
Makadsi; Absolute.; Tedesco	M8NSE; Chico Blanco; Anaco	I. Jordan; Seretide; Verushka

=== The 501 Club ===
Thursday, 5 June 2025	Friday, 6 June 2025	Saturday, 7 June 2025
This Is Lorelei; Lambrini Girls; Dame Area	Gouge Away; Been Stellar; Sailor Honeymoon	Jersey; Momma; Alan Sparhawk

=== The Levi's Plaza ===
Thursday, 5 June 2025	Friday, 6 June 2025	Saturday, 7 June 2025
Snow Strippers; John Glacier; Rigoberta Bandini	AMORE; Chloe Qisha; Azuleja	Simona; Crystal Murray; Yullola

== Primavera a la Ciutat line-up ==
=== Razzmatazz ===
Wednesday, 4 June 2025
- Beach House

=== Sala Apolo ===
Monday, 2 June 2025	Tuesday, 3 June 2025	Wednesday, 4 June 2025 (Note: Billed as BBC Radio 6 Music Club Night.)	Sunday, 8 June 2025
Yseult; Luvcat; Casero; Maig	Nilüfer Yanya; Youth Lagoon; Christopher Owens; Huir	Dave P; Kelly Lee Owens (DJ set); Fcukers; Nathan Shepherd	Dave P; Machine Girl; Kneecap; Jane Remover; Eterna

=== La [2] Apolo ===
Monday, 2 June 2025	Tuesday, 3 June 2025	Wednesday, 4 June 2025	Sunday, 8 June 2025
Seefeel; Nadah El Shazly	Allie X; Lambrini Girls; Pipiolas	Frost Children (DJ set); AKA HEX; Tommy Wright III; Jawnino; Boris Bidjan Saberi – Blood On	Chat Pile; Dehd; Los Campesinos!; Horsegirl; Sal Del Coche

=== Enfants ===
Wednesday, 4 June 2025
- George B2B Waxse
- Mechatok
- Isabella Lovestory
- Koreless
- John Glacier
- John Talabot

=== Paral·lel 62 ===
Monday, 2 June 2025	Tuesday, 3 June 2025	Sunday, 8 June 2025
Peter Doherty; Warmduscher; Real Farmer	Tinariwen; Waclaw Zimpel & Saagara; Ganavya; Cushla	The Jesus Lizard; Kim Deal; Cap'n Jazz; Comic Sans

=== La Nau ===
Monday, 2 June 2025	Sunday, 8 June 2025
Underscores; Dummy	Sailor Honeymoon; Momma

=== CCCB ===
Wednesday, 4 June 2025	Thursday, 5 June 2025	Friday, 6 June 2025
xicu; Remei de Ca la Fresca; okdw; GUINEU; JENYS; Hypnosis Therapy; MĖLYNA; Francis of Delirium; L E M F R E C K; OSKA	Bucket; Naaz; NEONE The Wonderer; Juana Aguirre; han gaiden; Sofi Paez	Milledenials; Hayes & Y; Isla Mujeres; Yoni Mayraz; Aleksiah; Niamh Bury

=== Laut ===
Monday, 2 June 2025	Tuesday, 3 June 2025	Wednesday, 4 June 2025	Sunday, 8 June 2025
Tristwch Y Fenywod; damoridemort	Big Special; Good Looks	Soul Jazz Records Sound System (DJ set); Mohama Saz	Belén Natalí; Finale

== Headline sets ==
Charli XCX & Troye Sivan present Sweat
1. Got Me Started
2. What's the Time Where You Are?
3. My My My!
4. 365
5. 360
6. Von Dutch
7. In My Room
8. Dance to This
9. Rager Teenager!
10. Club Classics
11. Unlock It
12. Sympathy Is a Knife
13. Guess
14. Bloom
15. Spring Breakers
16. Girl, So Confusing
17. One of Your Girls
18. Everything Is Romantic
19. Speed Drive
20. Apple
21. Silly
22. You
23. Stud
24. 365
25. Vroom Vroom
26. 1999
27. Track 10
28. I Love It
29. Honey
30. Rush
31. Talk Talk
Sabrina Carpenter
1. Busy Woman
2. Taste
3. Good Graces
4. Slim Pickins
5. Bed Chem
6. Manchild
7. Coincidence
8. Because I Liked a Boy
9. It's Raining Men (The Weather Girls cover)
10. Nonsense
11. Couldn't Make It Any Harder
12. Feather
13. Juno
14. Please Please Please
15. Don't Smile
16. Espresso
Chappell Roan
1. Super Graphic Ultra Modern Girl
2. Femininomenon
3. After Midnight
4. Naked in Manhattan
5. Guilty Pleasure
6. Casual
7. The Subway
8. Hot to Go!
9. Barracuda (Heart cover)
10. Picture You
11. Kaleidoscope
12. The Giver
13. Red Wine Supernova
14. Coffee
15. Good Luck, Babe!
16. My Kink Is Karma
17. Pink Pony Club
Central Cee
1. Doja
2. GBP
3. Loading
4. 6 For 6
5. Day in the Life
6. Ten
7. St. Patrick’s
8. Truth in the Lies
9. Overseas
10. Commitment Issues
11. Did It First
12. Obsessed With You
13. gen z luv
14. Now We’re Strangers
15. LET GO
16. Gata
17. CRG
18. UK Rap
19. Sprinter
20. No Introduction
21. BAND4BAND

== Statistics ==
The festival featured 311 total performances, including 224 at Parc del Fòrum and 87 across the venues of Barcelona as part of Primavera a la Ciutat. 65% of attendees came from abroad representing 136 different countries, with the most popular being the United Kingdom and the United States. 80,000 residents of Barcelona attended at least one festival event.

The average age of attendees was 29, and the artist programming was balanced across 40% male, 40% female and 20% mixed-gender or non-binary performers.

== Reception ==
In November 2024, Stereogum said that "rock-leaning institutions embracing pop is not a new phenomenon" but described the Primavera headliners as "a new frontier in poptimism." The festival's emphasis on the three biggest female pop stars of the moment was praised by publications including Pitchfork, Stereogum, Exclaim!, Teen Vogue, Elle and The Fader. Festival co-director Alfonso Lanza said, "We’ve always had one foot in the underground and one in pop culture. That balance takes risk, vision, and long-term thinking, even more so when you’re committed to gender balance too."

The Independent wrote that "Where Glastonbury seems forever stuck in its nostalgia mud, Primavera has always embraced the now." Stereogum said that "It might be the only fest where you can see Chappell Roan and Chat Pile within an hour of one another" and praised Turnstile's 3 a.m. set on the final day as "the grand finale of Primavera Sound 2025."

However, The Line of Best Fit questioned if, "In becoming the most exciting pop music festival in a long time, are they at risk of eroding their core fan base?", noting that there was a "central tension" in the festival's "constant quest for mass appeal" because "long-time followers of the festival expressed angst towards attendees primarily there to see the three headliners."
