= Something to Give Each Other Tour =

2024 concert tour by Troye Sivan

- Tour by Troye Sivan
- promotional poster
- Associated album: Something to Give Each Other
- Start date: 29 May 2024
- End date: 2 December 2024
- Legs: 2
- No. of shows: 29

Troye Sivan concert chronology
- The Bloom Tour (2018–19); Something to Give Each Other Tour (2024); Sweat (2024)

Something to Give Each Other Tour was the fifth headlining concert tour by Australian singer Troye Sivan, in support of his third studio album, Something to Give Each Other (2023). It was Sivan's first tour in five years following the Bloom Tour which ran from 2018 to 2019. The first leg began on 29 May 2024 in Lisbon, Portugal, and concluded on 28 June in Birmingham, England. He was supported by Jodie Harsh for the UK dates and by Nick Ward for the Oceania dates.

At the 2025 ARIA Music Awards, it was nominated for ARIA Award for Best Australian Live Act.

== Critical reception ==
The tour received positive reviews from critics. Kevin LeBlanc of Nylon praised Sivan's "homoerotic fashion choices" as "tasteful" and "simple yet affective" and wrote that Sivan delivered on "the queer Bushwick-meets-runway fashion" of the album cycle and the "gay pop star fantasy with a now-signature recipe: a dash of George Michael, a hint of '90s runway fashion, and a sprinkle of Berlin club attire". For Attitude, Alastair James favourably compared Sivan's show to Dua Lipa's Future Nostalgia Tour, stating that Sivan showcased the same "bonafide star quality" Lipa did at the AO Arena two years prior and that Sivan could "do it all – the party, the love, and the heartbreak", though noted that the show felt a bit reserved due to the lack of a bigger stage and that it could have gone longer than the compact setlist allowed it to but nonetheless praised the show as a "spectacle" and a "sweaty and euphoric party".

Flo Laurent of Hot Press described watching Sivan be "unapologetically queer" as "deeply heart-warming", especially a few days before Dublin Pride, and praised his range as a performer and his ability to let his dancers shine.

Charlie Duncan of PinkNews described the show and Sivan as both "hot and gay", the choreography as "crisp" and "so intense it looks like you’re watching a real life music video", and the different outfits as matching Sivan’s "effortlessly cool and gay" aesthetic. Duncan praised Sivan's ability to "marry vulnerability and vocals with sex and stardom", noting the more intimate tracks being preceded by private-life insights from Sivan himself to draw the audience in. He criticized the Ariana Grande section as "flat" due to the lack of Grande's presence but noted it as only a "minor misstep" quickly forgotten by the changing sets, the "horny dance moves" with Sivan grinding on or snogging dancers as almost "too scandalous to watch", and the guest appearances from Ross Lynch and Charli XCX at the OVO Arena Wembley show.

== Set list ==
This set list is representative of the 29 May 2024 show in Lisbon. It is not intended to represent all concerts for the duration of the tour.

1. "Got Me Started"
2. "What's The Time Where You Are?"
3. "My My My!"
4. "In My Room"
5. "Dance to This"
6. "Supernatural" (remix)
7. "Bloom"
8. "Still Got It"
9. "Can't Go Back, Baby"
10. "Could Cry Just Thinkin About You"
11. "Heaven"
12. "One of Your Girls"
13. "Silly"
14. "You"
15. "Stud"
16. "1999"
17. "Honey"
18. "Rush"

== Tour dates ==
List of concerts showing date, city, country, and venue
| Date (2024) | City | Country | Venue |
Leg 1 – Europe
| 29 May | Lisbon | Portugal | Coliseu dos Recreios |
| 31 May (Note: The 31 May 2024 concert in Barcelona, Spain at the Parc del Fòrum is part of Primavera Sound.) | Barcelona | Spain | Parc del Fòrum |
| 2 June (Note: The 2 June 2024 concert in Paris, France at the Bois de Vincennes is part of We Love Green.) | Paris | France | Bois de Vincennes |
| 5 June | Stockholm | Sweden | Hovet |
| 7 June (Note: The 7 June 2024 concert in Aarhus, Denmark is part of NorthSide Festival.) | Aarhus | Denmark | Eskelunden |
| 8 June (Note: The 8 June 2024 concert in Warsaw, Poland is part of Orange Warsaw Festival.) | Warsaw | Poland | Racetrack Służewiec |
| 9 June | Prague | Czechia | Sportovní hala Fortuna |
| 11 June | Berlin | Germany | Velodrom |
| 12 June | Hamburg | Germany | Sporthalle |
| 14 June | Munich | Germany | Zenith |
| 15 June | Zürich | Switzerland | The Hall |
| 17 June | Frankfurt | Germany | Jahrhunderthalle |
| 18 June | Düsseldorf | Germany | Mitsubishi Electric Halle |
| 20 June | Amsterdam | Netherlands | Ziggo Dome |
| 22 June | Manchester | England | AO Arena |
| 23 June | Glasgow | Scotland | OVO Hydro |
| 25 June | Dublin | Ireland | 3Arena |
| 27 June | London | England | Wembley Arena |
| 28 June | Birmingham | England | Utilita Arena |
Leg 2 – Oceania
| 16 November (Note: The 16 and 17 November concerts in Perth, Australia at the Kings Park are part of Spilt Milk.) | Perth | Australia | Kings Park |
| 17 November (Note: The 16 and 17 November concerts in Perth, Australia at the Kings Park are part of Spilt Milk.) | Perth | Australia | Kings Park |
| 19 November | Adelaide | Australia | The Drive |
| 21 November | Melbourne | Australia | Sidney Myer Music Bowl |
| 23 November (Note: The 23 November concert in Gold Coast, Australia at the Southport Broadwater Parklands is part of Spilt Milk.) | Gold Coast | Australia | Southport Broadwater Parklands |
| 24 November (Note: The 24 November concert in Newcastle, Australia at the Newcastle Entertainment Centre is part of Spilt Milk.) | Newcastle | Australia | Newcastle Entertainment Centre |
| 26 November | Brisbane | Australia | Riverstage |
| 28 November | Sydney | Australia | Sydney Opera House Forecourt |
| 29 November | Sydney | Australia | Sydney Opera House Forecourt |
| 2 December | Auckland | New Zealand | Spark Arena |
