= Primavera Sound 2026 =

Music festival in Barcelona, Spain

- Genre: Indie rock; post-punk; shoegaze; hyperpop
- Dates: 4 June 2026 – 6 June 2026
- Locations: Parc del Fòrum, Barcelona (Catalonia, Spain)
- Coordinates: 41°24′40.75″N 2°13′28.57″E
- Founders: Pablo Soler
- Previous event: Primavera Sound 2025
- Next event: Primavera Sound 2027
- Attendance: 287,000
- Capacity: 75,000
- Website: www.primaverasound.com

Primavera Sound 2026 was a music festival that took place from 4–6 June 2026 at the Parc del Fòrum in Barcelona, Spain. It was the 24th edition of the festival. It was to be headlined by Doja Cat, Massive Attack and Bad Gyal on Thursday, (Note: All three sets, as well as Alex G and Mac DeMarco's performances, were cancelled on the day due to "adverse weather and technical conditions".) The Cure, Addison Rae and Skrillex on Friday and the xx, Gorillaz and My Bloody Valentine on Saturday. The festival also featured a surprise set from Olivia Rodrigo.

In February, it became the second-straight edition of the festival to be fully sold out. Attendance was reported at 287,000. All three headlining sets on Thursday, as well as a few other performances, were cancelled because of heavy rain and winds up to 80 km/h.

== Background ==
Primavera Sound revealed its 2026 lineup on 25 September 2025, the earliest reveal date in festival history. It featured headliners The Cure, who last played the festival in 2012 and gave the longest single performance in Primavera history at nearly three hours. Massive Attack are "performing for the first time at Primavera Sound to settle a historic debt" after cancelling their scheduled 2022 appearance. My Bloody Valentine and The xx had both been inactive since 2018. The edition's branding was a reference to the 1992 Summer Olympics, which were also held in Barcelona.

The day splits were revealed on 21 October 2025. Lola Young was removed from the lineup because she cancelled all of her upcoming performances following an on-stage collapse. TV Girl and Sudan Archives were added in her place.

On 4 December 2025, the artist names were released for Primavera a la Ciutat, the parallel program taking place in Barcelona city venues during the week of the festival. It included artists not on the festival lineup such as Mogwai, Yves Tumor and Current 93, as well as second sets by festival artists such as Blood Orange and Joey Valence & Brae. The seven venues used this year are Sala Apolo, Razzmatazz, Paral·lel 62, La Nau, LAUT, Enfants and CCCB.

On 11 February 2026, the festival announced that it had fully sold out for the second consecutive year.

The schedule for the Primavera a la Ciutat program was revealed on 9 April. On 28 April, a second set from Cara Delevingne was added as part of the Ciutat program. On 19 May, the festival map and schedule was released. On 21 May, the lineup for the Cupra Pulse stage was revealed, which included a DJ set from The Avalanches.

On 26 May, the festival announced that Geese would also perform at Paral·lel 62 on the Wednesday of the festival as part of the Ciutat program.

== Festival ==
Wet Leg headlined the "Jornada Inaugural" opening day held at Parc del Fòrum on Wednesday, 3 June 2026.

The festival began on Thursday, 4 June. Cameron Winter's early 5:00 pm performance at the limited 3,084-capacity Auditori Rockdelux led to attendees queueing at noon. Winter also performed later that day with his band Geese. During Geese's performance, rain which was forecasted at 40–60 mm per hour began to fall at Parc del Fòrum. Geese would be the last artist that night to play on the festival's three biggest stages. The rain, which was described as "an hours-long downpour" by The Independent, was combined with 80 km/h winds, first leading to the cancellation of Alex G's 8:50 p.m. performance on the main Revolut stage and Mac DeMarco's 9:55 p.m. performance on the Occident stage. After the cancellations, Father John Misty's 11:00 p.m. set at the Cupra stage was the first to resume the music.

At 11:30 p.m., the festival announced that Massive Attack's set — originally scheduled for 9:55 p.m. — was rescheduled for 12:30 a.m., and that Doja Cat's 11:35 p.m. set had to be cancelled as a result. However, at 1:00 a.m., the festival announced that Massive Attack and Bad Gyal's rescheduled main stage headline sets were now both cancelled. All other stages proceeded with their planned scheduling.

The festival stated the next day that, at the time of the initial announcement, both Massive Attack and Primavera believed the band could perform at 12:30 a.m. because of "a more favourable weather forecast", but it proved to be inaccurate and "the rain, and particularly the wind persisted in the area around these stages, ultimately making it impossible" for performances to continue. Buyers of Thursday single-day tickets were refunded.

The Cure began their tour on Friday with their first show in almost two years. They played 29 songs in two-and-a-half hours, including several deep cuts – "2 Late" (the B-side to "Lovesong") for the first time since 2019, "Wrong Number" for the first time since 2019, "Alt.end" for the first time since 2018 and "Mint Car" for the first time since 2016. PinkPantheress's crowd on the Cupra stage was reported to be past capacity, with reports that her assigned stage was too small for an artist of her size and popularity.

In the middle of the festival on the Saturday, Olivia Rodrigo announced a surprise performance at the Occident stage for 10:20 p.m. Days before, festival director Gabi Ruiz promised a "Haaland"-level secret artist set to play a gap in the announced stage schedule. During her set, Robert Smith came out as a surprise guest to debut their unannounced duet together, "What's Wrong with Me". At Gorillaz's headlining set, the band brought out Kara Jackson, Moonchild Sanelly, Yasiin Bey, Little Simz, Bootie Brown and Posdnous of De La Soul. Ninajirachi's crowd for her 3:40 a.m. set was reported to have stretched all the way to the barricade of the stage opposite her's.

== Line-up ==
Headline acts are listed in bold.

=== Estrella Damm ===
Thursday, 4 June 2026	Friday, 5 June 2026	Saturday, 6 June 2026
**Bad Gyal** (cancelled); **Massive Attack** (cancelled); Ravyn Lenae; Aiko el Grupo	**The Cure**; Ethel Cain; NewDad	**Gorillaz**; **My Bloody Valentine**; Big Thief

=== Revolut ===
Thursday, 4 June 2026	Friday, 5 June 2026	Saturday, 6 June 2026
**Doja Cat** (cancelled); Alex G (cancelled); Blood Orange	**Skrillex**; **Addison Rae**; Slowdive	**The xx**; Little Simz; Baxter Dury; Benny B

=== Occident ===
Thursday, 4 June 2026	Friday, 5 June 2026	Saturday, 6 June 2026
Overmono; TV Girl; Mac DeMarco; Geese; Raly	Jade Thirlwall; Role Model; Rilo Kiley; Somos la Herencia	Kneecap; Marina; Olivia Rodrigo; Ashnikko; Sudan Archives; Bestia Bebé

=== Cupra ===
Thursday, 4 June 2026	Friday, 5 June 2026	Saturday, 6 June 2026
Yousuke Yukimatsu; 2hollis; Father John Misty; Oklou; Men I Trust; Gisela João	KI/KI; PinkPantheress; Amaarae; Ralphie Choo; Buscabulla; Pavvla	Peggy Gou; Knocked Loose; Dijon; Rusowsky; Grace Ives; Jimena Amarillo

== Reception ==
The edition's lineup was seen as returning to the festival's roots after the mainstream pop-centered headliners of 2025. Headliners such as The Cure and My Bloody Valentine "focus on an intergenerational mix of rock’s foremost innovators", according to Relix. Tom Breihan of Stereogum said the festival was "largely going back to the classics" and reaffirmed his belief that Primavera Sound is "possibly the greatest annual music festival on the face of the planet."

Billboard praised Olivia Rodrigo's secret set as a smart promotional move for her in the days leading up to the release of a new album, as "Primavera has remained intentional and discerning enough in its lineup curation over the years that an appearance there still connotes a certain level of cred."
