= Jessica Pratt (album) =

Studio album by Jessica Pratt
- Released: November 20, 2012
- Recorded: 2007
- Genre: Folk
- Length: 40:58
- Label: Birth
- Producer: Craig Gotsill

Jessica Pratt chronology
Jessica Pratt (2012)	On Your Own Love Again (2015)

Singles from Jessica Pratt
- 1. "Night Faces" Released: November 1, 2012

Jessica Pratt is the debut studio album by American folk singer-songwriter Jessica Pratt. It was released on November 20, 2012 through Darker My Love guitarist Tim Presley's record label, Birth Records. Produced by Craig Gotsill, the album features the songs that were originally recorded in 2007 over analogue tape.

It was preceded by a single, Night Faces, which was released online on November 1 and was well received by Pitchfork, who called in "pure and radiant folk poetry that's commanding even at its most whispered moments". The initial 500 pressings of the album sold out in less than two weeks. It received attention from many music websites and magazines, including Pitchfork, Consequence of Sound and PopMatters.

In 2026, musician Asher White covered the album in its entirety and released it under the same title through the record label Joyful Noise.

== Critical reception ==
Upon its release, Jessica Pratt received positive reviews from music critics. At Metacritic, which assigns a normalized rating out of 100 to reviews from critics, the album received an average score of 78, which indicates "generally favorable reviews", based on 7 reviews. James Reed of The Boston Globe though that "the album brings to mind the homespun intimacy of Sibylle Baier’s “Colour Green” and Karen Dalton’s world-weary take on folk blues," while describing the songs on the album as "quiet gems cradled in the rudimentary but delicate fingerpicking of her acoustic guitar." Consequence of Sound critic Philips Cosores wrote: "Pratt has provided for herself a successful introduction to the world, where her unpredictable melodies and vocal tics proudly display strengths and weaknesses with unwavering confidence, reminding of the potential contained in minimal production and instrumentation." Nevertheless, PopMatters critic Elias Leight was more mixed in his review, writing: "Sometimes Pratt’s nervousness about being looped into a scene extends to her album’s production. Some songs are cloaked in hissing tape, and her lyrics can be difficult to make out."

Professional ratings
Aggregate scores
Source	Rating
Metacritic	78/100
Review scores
Source	Rating
Consequence	B
Pitchfork	7.5/10
PopMatters	6/10

== Track listing ==
All tracks are written by Jessica Pratt.

No.	Title	Length
1.	"Night Faces"	4:08
2.	"Hollywood"	3:27
3.	"Bushel Hyde"	4:10
4.	"Mountain 'r Lower"	3:18
5.	"Half Twain the Jesse"	5:24
6.	"Casper"	4:26
7.	"Midnight Wheels"	3:19
8.	"Mother Big River"	4:19
9.	"Streets of Mine"	2:43
10.	"Titles Under Pressure"	2:33
11.	"Dreams"	3:11
Total length:		40:58

== Personnel ==
- Jessica Pratt – writing, performance, insert artwork
- Tim Presley – artwork, layout
- Craig Gotsill – production
