= Quiet Signs =

Studio album by Jessica Pratt
- Released: February 8, 2019
- Genre: Folk
- Length: 27:48
- Label: Mexican Summer
- Producer: Al Carlson

Jessica Pratt chronology
On Your Own Love Again (2015)	Quiet Signs (2019)	Here in the Pitch (2024)

Quiet Signs is the third studio album by American singer-songwriter Jessica Pratt. It was released on February 8, 2019, through Mexican Summer. The album was produced by Al Carlson.

Professional ratings
Aggregate scores
Source	Rating
AnyDecentMusic?	7.9/10
Metacritic	84/100
Review scores
Source	Rating
AllMusic	4.5/5 stars
Consequence of Sound	B+
The Guardian	3/5 stars
The Irish Times	4/5 stars
Mojo	4/5 stars
The Observer	3/5 stars
Pitchfork	8.4/10
Q	5/5 stars
Rolling Stone	3.5/5 stars
Uncut	8/10

== Track listing ==
All tracks are written by Jessica Pratt.

No.	Title	Length
1.	"Opening Night"	1:40
2.	"As the World Turns"	3:11
3.	"Fare Thee Well"	4:05
4.	"Here My Love"	2:54
5.	"Poly Blue"	2:43
6.	"This Time Around"	3:37
7.	"Crossing"	2:48
8.	"Silent Song"	3:13
9.	"Aeroplane"	3:37

== Charts ==
Chart (2019)	Peak position
Belgian Albums (Ultratop Flanders)	144
Scottish Albums (Official Charts)	77
UK Independent Albums (Official Charts)	15
US Heatseekers Albums (Billboard)	4
US Independent Albums (Billboard)	16
