= Good Graces =

Song by Sabrina Carpenter

from the album Short n' Sweet
- Released: August 23, 2024
- Studio: Santa Ynez House, The Playpen (Calabasas, California); The Perch (Calabasas, California)
- Genre: Pop; R&B
- Length: 3:05
- Label: Island
- Songwriters: Sabrina Carpenter; Julia Michaels; Amy Allen; John Ryan; Julian Bunetta
- Producers: John Ryan; Julian Bunetta

Lyric video
- “Good Graces” on YouTube

"Good Graces" is a song by American singer Sabrina Carpenter from her sixth studio album, Short n' Sweet (2024). The song became available as the album's third track on August 23, 2024, when it was released by Island Records. A pop and R&B song with Miami bass and UK garage influences and hip-hop rhythms, Carpenter wrote it with songwriters Julia Michaels and Amy Allen and its producers, John Ryan and Julian Bunetta.

Commercially, "Good Graces" reached the top twenty in Australia, Canada, New Zealand, Sweden, and the United States, and also reached number 15 on the Billboard Global 200. The song received mixed reception with some praising the 1990s R&B influences and Carpenter's vocal delivery and others criticizing the song's lyricism.

== Background ==
In January 2021, Sabrina Carpenter signed a recording contract with Island Records. She announced that she was working on her sixth studio album in March 2024, exploring new genres and expecting that it would herald a new chapter in her life. In anticipation of her performance at Coachella, Carpenter announced that a single called "Espresso" would be released on April 11, 2024. The song was a surprise success, becoming her first number one single on the Billboard Global 200 chart and her first song to enter the top 10 on the Billboard Hot 100. She followed this with "Please Please Please" (2024), which reached number one on the Billboard Hot 100.

Preceding an official announcement, billboards bearing tweets about Carpenter's height began appearing throughout New York City. On June 3, 2024, she announced that the album, titled Short n' Sweet, would be released by Island Records on August 23, 2024, and revealed its cover artwork. The tracklist was revealed on July 9, 2024.

Carpenter wrote the song "Good Graces" with songwriters Julia Michaels and Amy Allen and its producers, John Ryan and Julian Bunetta. The song became available for digital download on the album, which was released on August 23, 2024.

== Composition ==
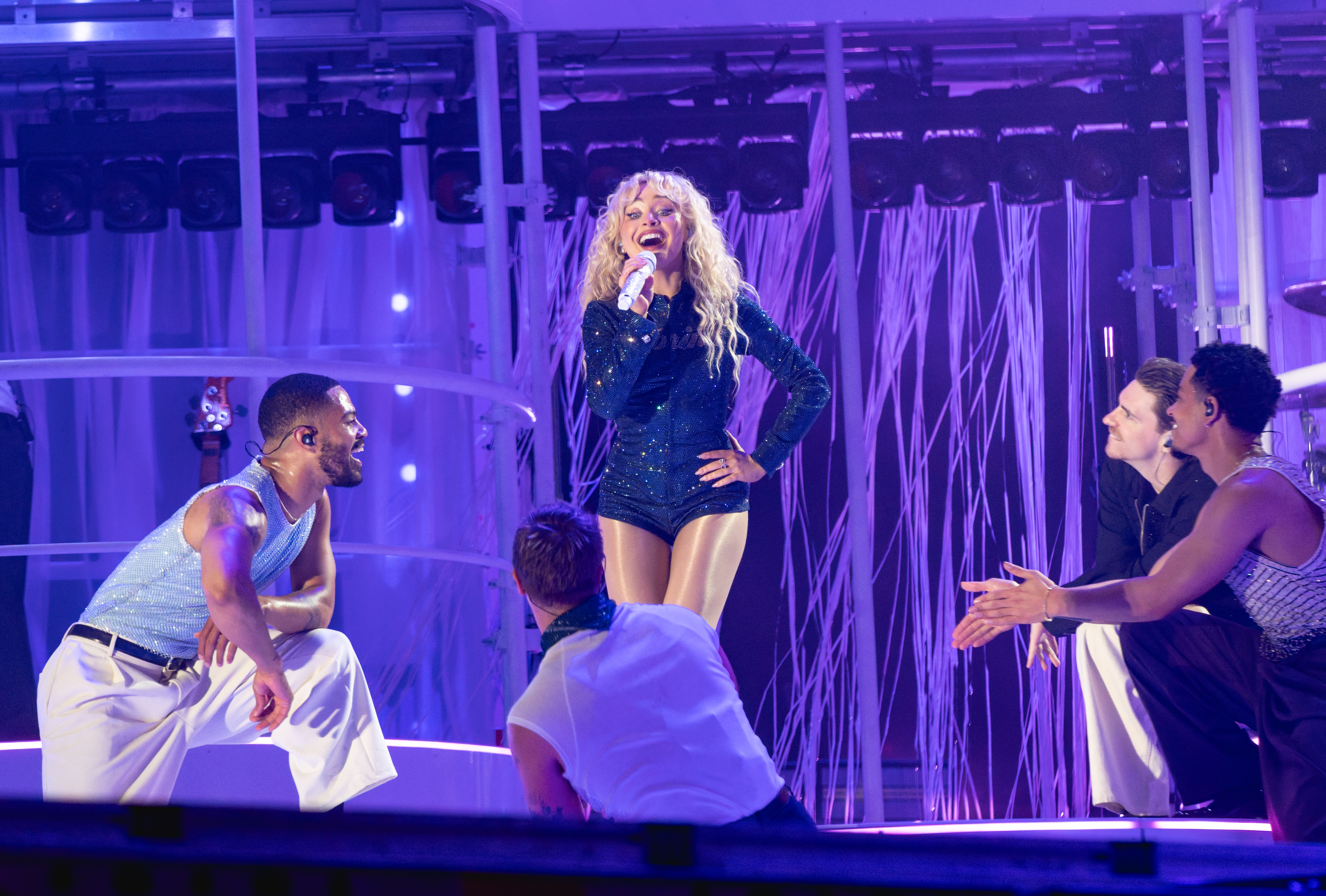
Carpenter performing "Good Graces" at Primavera Sound 2025

Labeled as a pop and R&B song, "Good Graces" is three minutes and five seconds long. It was recorded at Santa Ynez House, the Playpen and the Perch in Calabasas, California. Billboard's Jason Lipshutz thought the song "coats that post-breakup coldness in the buttery sounds of '90s R&B, with Carpenter channeling the rhythmic pop style that artists like Mariah Carey and TLC handled so masterfully and putting her tongue-in-cheek spin on its warm textures". Jaeden Pinder of Pitchfork described it as "a twinkly Miami bass-influenced" song, on which Carpenter channels Ariana Grande's 2016 album Dangerous Woman with her "whispery vocal runs" and NewJeans's EP Get Up while chanting "I won't give a fuck about you". WhyNow’s Hannah Mylrea noted elements of UK garage on the track, while Spencer Kornhaber of The Atlantic noted its hip-hop rhythms.

"Good Graces" has a similar lyrical theme to "Please Please Please", where Carpenter urges a man to be honest and open, refusing to accept anything less. In the former, she parlays more confidence and strongly projects that she will leave a man who does not respect her. Carpenter stresses that her affectionate actions should not be seen as naive: "When I love you, I'm sweet like an angel / Drawing hearts around our names and dreaming of writing vows, rocking cradles / Don't mistake my nice for naive." Carpenter says that she will not be afraid to walk away if the partner does "something suspect" and commands him to stay in her "good graces": "'Cause no one's more amazin' / At turnin' lovin' into hatred."

== Critical reception ==
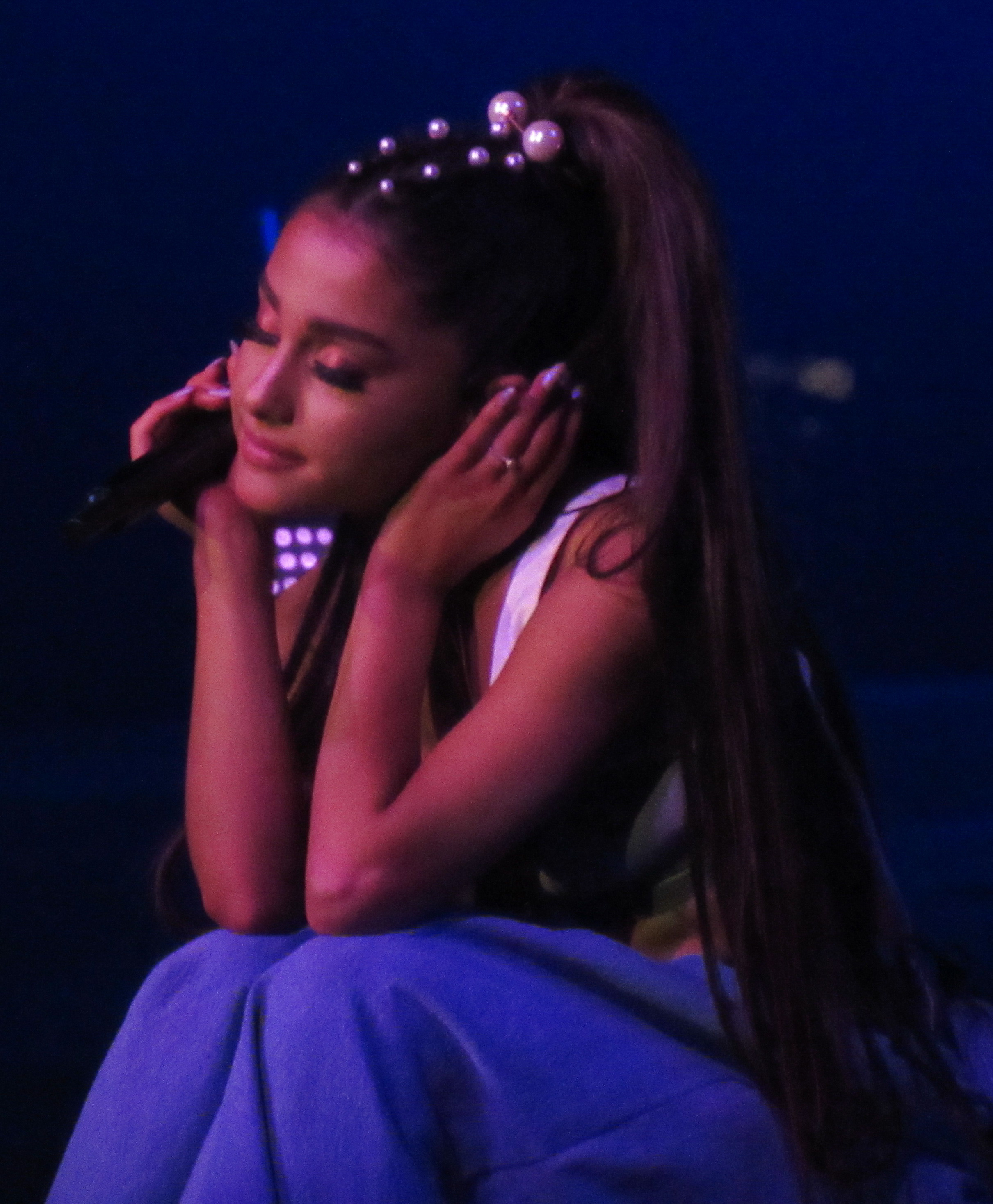
"Good Graces" was compared to the works of Ariana Grande (pictured).

Pinder picked "Good Graces" as a highlight on Short n' Sweet. Lipshutz ranked it ninth among the twelve album tracks, praising the 1990s and R&B influences on the song and opining that Carpenter put "her tongue-in-cheek spin on its warm textures". Capital's Sam Prance thought that the "lyrics are just as addictive as the poppy beat in the background". On the other hand, Helen Brown of The Independent thought its 1990s R&B was "a little forgettable".

Commenting on Carpenter's performance, Sputnikmusic's Sowing believed she displayed "superb vocals" and praised the delivery of the line: "I don't waste a second, I know lots of guys / You do somethin' suspect, this cute ass bye-bye". However, he was disappointed that this led into "aimless trap beats and a repetitive [...] refrain". Ims Taylor of Clash thought "her delicate delivery over an R&B-esque beat feels less assertive, more almost panicked and protective, ready to run away at the first sign of danger".

== Commercial performance ==
"Good Graces" debuted at number 15 on the US Billboard Hot 100 issued for September 7, 2024. In Canada, the song entered at number 16 on the Canadian Hot 100 issued for the same date. In the United Kingdom, it debuted at number 19 on the Official Audio Streaming Chart. In Australia, "Good Graces" entered at number 12. The song debuted at number 17 in New Zealand. It charted at number 15 on the Billboard Global 200. "Good Graces" also reached national record charts at number 9 in Singapore, number 17 on the Sweden Heatseeker chart, number 28 in Portugal, and number 94 in Greece.

== Credits and personnel ==
Credits are adapted from the liner notes of Short n' Sweet.

- Sabrina Carpenter – vocals, songwriter
- John Ryan – producer, songwriter, drums, guitar, keyboards, percussion, programming, engineer, bass
- Julian Bunetta – producer, songwriter, drums, guitar, keyboards, percussion, programming, engineer, bass
- Julia Michaels – songwriter
- Amy Allen – songwriter
- Jeff Gunnell – engineer
- Nathan Dantzler – mastering
- Harrison Tate – mastering assistance
- Manny Marroquin – mixing
- Zach Pereyra – mixing assistance
- Anthony Vilchisa – mixing assistance
- Trey Station – mixing assistance

== Charts ==
Chart performance for "Good Graces"
Chart (2024–2025)	Peak position
Australia (ARIA)	12
Canada Hot 100 (Billboard)	16
Global 200 (Billboard)	15
Greece International (IFPI)	94
New Zealand (Recorded Music NZ)	17
Norway (VG-lista)	55
Philippines (Philippines Hot 100)	30
Portugal (AFP)	28
Singapore (RIAS)	9
Sweden Heatseeker (Sverigetopplistan)	17
UK Streaming (OCC)	19
US Billboard Hot 100	15

== Certifications ==
Certifications for "Good Graces"
Region	Certification	Certified units/sales
Australia (ARIA)	Platinum	70,000^{‡}
Brazil (Pro-Música Brasil)	3× Platinum	120,000^{‡}
Canada (Music Canada)	Platinum	80,000^{‡}
New Zealand (RMNZ)	Platinum	30,000^{‡}
United Kingdom (BPI)	Gold	400,000^{‡}
United States (RIAA)	Platinum	1,000,000^{‡}
^{‡} Sales+streaming figures based on certification alone.
