= Jessica Pratt (singer-songwriter) =

American singer-songwriter (born 1987)

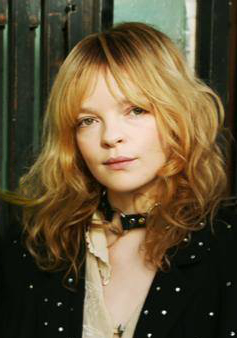
- Pratt in 2014

Background information
- Born: April 24, 1987 (age 39); Redding, California, U.S.
- Origin: San Francisco, California, U.S.
- Genres: Psychedelic folk; folk-pop; indie folk; freak folk
- Occupation: Singer-songwriter
- Instruments: Vocals; guitar
- Years active: 2007–present
- Labels: Birth; Drag City; Mexican Summer; City Slang
- Website: jessicapratt.net

Jessica Pratt (born April 24, 1987) is an American singer-songwriter. Her self-titled debut album was released in 2012 via Birth Records, a record label founded by White Fence songwriter Tim Presley to release Pratt's music. She is often associated with the freak folk movement. Her second and third albums are On Your Own Love Again (2015, Drag City) and Quiet Signs (2019, Mexican Summer/City Slang). She released her fourth album, Here in the Pitch, in 2024.

== Early life ==
Pratt grew up in Redding. Pratt was raised by her mother, an astrologer, who exposed her to a broad range of artists, including Tim Buckley, X, and the Gun Club. After her older brother gave up playing his Stratocaster, she learned to play the guitar around the age of 15. She took his guitar and started practicing with the 1971 T. Rex album Electric Warrior. She was soon able to play the guitar parts of the record. She began recording songs at the age of 16, using her mother's Fender guitar amp and microphone.

== Musical career ==
After she moved to San Francisco, she was introduced to Tim Presley's solo project, White Fence, through Presley's brother, who was her roommate for three years. In the following years, Presley heard Pratt's demo songs through her then-boyfriend, who had posted her songs on Facebook. He eventually contacted her to release her music.

Pratt's self-titled debut album was released in 2012 through Presley's label, Birth Records. The album featured the songs that were originally recorded in 2007 over analogue tape. The initial 500 pressings of the album sold out in less than two weeks. It received attention from music websites and magazines, including Pitchfork, Consequence of Sound and PopMatters.

In January 2014, she revealed the studio version of a new track, "Game That I Play."

In October 2014, Pratt announced her second album, On Your Own Love Again. Pratt toured extensively around this record, both as a headliner and in support of Beach House, Panda Bear and José Gonzáles. On Your Own Love Again was ranked at #85 of Pitchfork's Best Albums of the 2010s. "Back, Baby" was sampled by Troye Sivan on his 2023 album Something to Give Each Other.

In October 2018, she announced her third album, Quiet Signs, and released a video for "This Time Around". Pitchfork reviewed the song, giving it the Best New Music designation and noting a stylistic shift, comparing it to "a Tropicalia version of a Christmas song, or a '60s jukebox standard playing in a beach town diner during the off-season." The album was released in February 2019 on the independent labels Mexican Summer and City Slang. It was the first one recorded in a proper studio which provided a crystalline sound. Pitchfork states the album "warps the typically direct, observational role of a singer-songwriter into something altogether more mystifying".

After writing throughout the pandemic, Pratt returned to Gary's Electric with Quiet Signs co-producer Al Carlson, Matt McDermott and session musicians including Spencer Zahn and Mauro Refosco, this time influenced by Beach Boys' Pet Sounds and the music of the '60s group the Walker Brothers. "I've always been very interested in that micro era of '60s pop music where the production is atmospheric like a snow globe," she told the New York Times on her intentions throughout the writing and recording process, which spanned from 2020 to 2023.

In February 2024, she released a video for a new track titled "Life Is" which served as the lead single for album Here in the Pitch, which was released on May 3, 2024, via Mexican Summer and City Slang, to universal acclaim. "Her chords are crisper, her singing more concrete and commanding, occasionally imagining echoes of lost Bowie or Beatles ballads aside her twilight bossa nova grooves," wrote Jen Pelly for NPR. Pitchfork awarded the album a Best New Music designation and an 8.8 score, stating Pratt's "fourth album of hypnagogic folk music hones her mysterious song to its finest point." The lead single from the record, "Life Is," concluded Chanel's Fall-Winter 2024/25 Haute Couture Show. She performed the song with her band on The Late Show in July 2024.

On August 2, 2024, she featured on the single "Highjack" by ASAP Rocky.

== Musical style ==
According to Philip Cosores of Consequence of Sound, Pratt's music "displays a lyrical and musical range without straying from a palette of picked acoustic guitar and raw, bending vocals" and nods to "60s folk, California classic rock, and the early 2000s freak folk." She is compared to various folk artists, including Joni Mitchell, Joan Baez, Sibylle Baier, David Crosby and Karen Dalton. She also expressed admiration for Ariel Pink.

Pratt dislikes the Joan Baez comparisons, and is hesitant about being classified strictly as "folk" or "freak-folk." In an interview with Impose magazine, she stated on the freak folk comparisons:

I think anybody has an opposition to being pigeonholed into semi-trendy music genres. I definitely love a lot of those artists. There have been comparisons to people like Joan Baez [who] plays very straight-forward folk music, almost academic folk music. I've written so much new material that I'm almost ready for a next record. I guess it's just my fear of sounding one-dimensional, or being classified as strictly a folk artist.

== Discography ==
=== Studio albums ===
- Jessica Pratt (2012)
- On Your Own Love Again (2015)
- Quiet Signs (2019)
- Here in the Pitch (2024)
