= Here in the Pitch =

Studio album by Jessica Pratt
- Released: May 3, 2024
- Recorded: 2021–2023
- Studio: Gary's Electric (Brooklyn)
- Genres: Folk; baroque pop; indie rock
- Length: 27:14
- Label: Mexican Summer - City Slang
- Producers: Jessica Pratt; Al Carlson; Matt McDermott; Peter Mudge

Jessica Pratt chronology
Quiet Signs (2019)	Here in the Pitch (2024)

Here in the Pitch is the fourth studio album by American singer-songwriter Jessica Pratt. It was released on May 3, 2024, through Mexican Summer and City Slang. The album received universal acclaim from music critics.

== Background ==
Here in the Pitch was inspired by the "hippie era" of Los Angeles and encapsulates the singer's obsessions with "figures emblematic of the dark side of the Californian dream". Pratt created the record alongside long-time collaborator Al Carlson, as well as keyboardist Matt McDermott, bassist Spencer Zahn, and percussionist Mauro Refosco. It also features contributions from Ryley Walker, Peter Mudge, and Alex Goldberg.

== Critical reception ==
Professional ratings
Aggregate scores
Source	Rating
AnyDecentMusic?	8.6/10
Metacritic	90/100
Review scores
Source	Rating
AllMusic	4.5/5 stars
Beats Per Minute	83%
Clash	8/10
The Guardian	5/5 stars
The Line of Best Fit	8/10
Mojo	4/5 stars
MusicOMH	5/5 stars
Paste	9.5/10
Pitchfork	8.8/10
PopMatters	8/10

According to the review aggregator Metacritic, Here in the Pitch received "universal acclaim" based on a weighted average score of 90 out of 100 from 14 critic scores. Editors at review aggregator AnyDecentMusic? scored this album an 8.6 out of 10, based on 19 critics' scores.

Concluding the review for AllMusic, Fred Thomas claimed that, "the expanded instrumentation gives them a prismatic glow and makes for one of the most fascinating and repeatable sets from an artist who was already in a class by herself." Jeremy D. Larson of Pitchfork awarded the album 8.8/10, as well as the site's "Best New Music" designation. Larson stated that the listener witnesses "music's greatest horologist" create another "ornate clock to hang on the wall" with the record. Albeit "difficult to describe", Here in the Pitch captures "this mysterious song that Pratt knows so well" across nine songs overall. The writer described it as a "prime example of hypnagogic folk" that quietly observes the "simultaneity of time" along with its "misery, wonder, and promise". In Paste, Matt Mitchell declared that, "You can listen to these nine songs and think there's something nostalgic to latch onto—and maybe there is—but what's so joyous and worthwhile about this collection is how detached from any particular generational label it is."

Elle Palmer at Far Out thought that Here in the Pitch was "well worth the" five-year long wait with every moment being "gorgeously constructed" to come together on an album "that should be enjoyed as such". Writing for The Line of Best Fit, John Amen saw the album as an evolution within Pratt's catalogue, building on the "dreamy spaciousness" of previous projects while "offering one lush hook after another". Amen went as far as calling it her "most fully realized and consistently evocative" album to date. Daniel Gard'ner of Under the Radar reaffirmed Pratt's notion about the "weird optimism" running through the album, in that there is a "subtle arc of light" within a "sticky blackness of bitumen".

=== Year-end lists ===
Select year-end rankings for Here in the Pitch
Publication/critic	Accolade	Rank	Ref.
BBC Radio 6 Music	26 Albums of the Year 2024	-	
Exclaim!	50 Best Albums of 2024	27	
MOJO	The Best Albums Of 2024	36	
Uncut	80 Best Albums of 2024	5	
Stereogum	The 50 Best Albums of 2024	6	
Pitchfork	The 50 Best Albums of 2024	3	

== Track listing ==
All tracks are written by Jessica Pratt; "Glances" written with Matt McDermott and Peter Mudge.

Here in the Pitch track listing
No.	Title	Length
1.	"Life Is"	3:08
2.	"Better Hate"	3:46
3.	"World on a String"	3:09
4.	"Get Your Head Out"	3:25
5.	"By Hook or by Crook"	3:27
6.	"Nowhere It Was"	2:41
7.	"Empires Never Know"	2:32
8.	"Glances"	1:31
9.	"The Last Year"	3:35
Total length:		27:14

== Personnel ==
Musicians

- Jessica Pratt – vocals (tracks 1–7, 9), guitar (1–6, 8, 9), timpani (2); 12-string guitar, drums (4)
- Al Carlson – bass (tracks 1–3); Mellotron trumpet, Mellotron strings, glockenspiel (1); baritone saxophone (2, 5), piano (3, 7, 9), string synthesizer (3), organ (4–6), Mellotron (4), Farfisa (5)
- Matt McDermott – Mellotron acoustic guitar, Mellotron horns (track 1); Mellotron harpsichord, Mellotron vibraphone (2); Rhodes (4); flute, synthesizer, Mellotron trumpet (7); Mellotron French horn (8)
- Peter Mudge – Mellotron acoustic guitar (track 1), Mellotron vibraphone (2), auxiliary percussion (4), organ (5, 8), Rhythm Ace drum machine (6), Mellotron French horn (8)
- Alex Goldberg – drums (tracks 1, 9)
- Ryley Walker – guitar (track 1)
- Mauro Refosco – percussion (tracks 2, 4–7)
- Spencer Zahn – bass (tracks 4, 5)

Technical

- Jessica Pratt – production
- Al Carlson – production (tracks 1–7, 9); mixing, mastering (all tracks)
- Matt McDermott – production (track 8), additional production (1–4, 7)
- Peter Mudge – production (track 8), additional production (1, 2, 4, 5)

Visuals

- Nina Gofur – photography
- Alex Tults – design, layout

== Charts ==
Chart performance for Here in the Pitch
Chart (2024)	Peak position
Belgian Albums (Ultratop Flanders)	143
Scottish Albums (Official Charts)	36
UK Album Downloads (Official Charts)	41
UK Independent Albums (Official Charts)	11
