= Telecom BCN =

Coordinates: 41°23′13.43″N 2°6′43.63″E

School logo

TelecomBCN (Catalan: Escola Tècnica Superior d'Enginyeria de Telecomunicació de Barcelona) is an engineering school of the Technical University of Catalonia.

TelecomBCN is one of the largest telecommunications engineering schools in Spain.

The school's objective is to train engineers in the fields of information and communication technologies. The school offers two study programs that culminate in two different official degrees: one in telecommunications engineering called Degree in Technologies and Services of Telecommunications Engineering, with four mentions (Audiovisual Systems Engineering, Electronic Systems Engineering, Telecommunications Systems Engineering and Telematics Engineering) and the other in Physics Engineering.

Currently, there are 5 Masters taught in English: Master in Telecommunications Engineering (MET), Master in Electronic Engineering (MEE), Interuniversity Master for Computer Vision, Master in Photonics and, the last one, Erasmus Mundus Master and PhD in Photonics Engineering, Nanophotonics and Biophotonics (Europhotonics).

== Location ==
The school's location is at the North Campus of Barcelona 20 minutes away of the center of the city. You can get there easily with public transport. The easiest way to arrive is using the green line of the underground and getting off at Palau Reial or Zona Universitaria stations. Near the school there black line communicates the school directly with the airport.

== Facts ==
The School

- Total number of students: 2005 (2013/2014)
- New students: 400
- Graduate students: 300 (2013/2014)
- Students with international experience : 99 (2013/2014)
- Exchange students : 109 (2013/2014)
- # Faculty: 301 (more than 75% are doctors)
- # Academic labs: 111

The Degrees

- Degree in Technologies and Services of Telecommunications Engineering
  - Audiovisual Systems
  - Electronic Systems
  - Telecommunications Systems
  - Telematics Systems
- Degree in Physics Engineering
  - mostly taught in English
  - possibility of doing double degree

The Masters

- Master in Telecommunications Engineering (MET)
- Master in Electronic Engineering (MEE)
- Interuniversity Master for Computer Vision
- Master in Photonics
- Master in Cybersecurity (2020)
- Erasmus Mundus Master and PhD in Photonics Engineering, Nanophotonics and Biophotonics (Europhotonics)

== International exchange programs ==
The school participates in exchange programs with different universities all over Europe, within the Socrates/Erasmus program and the TIME network (Top Industrial Managers for Europe), including higher education institutions in Austria, Belgium, Czech Republic, Denmark, Finland, France, Germany, Holland, Italy, Norway, Poland, Portugal, Romania, Slovenia, Sweden and more. It is also involved in student exchange programs with several universities in Switzerland, in the USA, in China, in Japan and in South-American countries, including Argentina, Brazil, Chile, Colombia, Mexico, Panama, Peru and Venezuela. In the academic year 2013/2014 it had a total of 96 partner universities.

== Research groups-departments ==
- Signal Theory and Communications: https://web.archive.org/web/20060820071608/http://www.tsc.upc.es/
- Networks Department: http://www-entel.upc.es/
- Electronics Department: http://petrus.upc.es/
- Applied Mathematics IV: http://www.ma4.upc.edu/?set_language=en
- Applied Physics: http://fa.upc.edu/?set_language=en
- Computer Architecture: http://www.ac.upc.edu/en
- Management: http://www.doe.upc.edu/
- Chemical Engineering: http://deq.upc.edu/en
- Design Engineering: https://web.archive.org/web/20160304051135/http://dpe.upc.edu/?set_language=en

== Telecogresca ==
Telecogresca is TelecomBCN's annual festival and is renowned as the largest university festival in Spain.

The first telecogresca took place on December 1, 1978, to celebrate the construction of a new building . On that first occasion, the party took place in the school itself.

Nowadays, it is known as a 'music festival' organized by volunteers with more than 10,000 attendees per edition. All benefits from the party are invested in the next year, so no profit is obtained.
