= On Your Own Love Again =

Studio album by Jessica Pratt
- Released: January 27, 2015
- Genres: Acoustic; dream pop; folk; lo-fi
- Length: 31:34
- Label: Drag City
- Producer: Jessica Pratt

Jessica Pratt chronology
Jessica Pratt (2012)	On Your Own Love Again (2015)	Quiet Signs (2019)

On Your Own Love Again is the second studio album by American musician Jessica Pratt. It was released on January 27, 2015, through Drag City. It is her only work with the label, as the 2019 follow-up Quiet Signs would be released through Mexican Summer.

== Composition ==
The songs on On Your Own Love Again are "dreamlike, radiant" folk songs, recalling musicians like Nick Drake, Angel Olsen and others. They have been seen for playing like acoustic dream pop songs, along with being "whimsically" experimental.

The album was recorded with a four-track, yielding a lo-fi aesthetic that showcases Pratt's "soft" vocals and fingerpicked guitar.

== Critical reception ==
Professional ratings
Aggregate scores
Source	Rating
AnyDecentMusic?	7.6/10
Metacritic	79/100
Review scores
Source	Rating
AllMusic	4.5/5 stars
Clash	8/10
Consequence	B
Exclaim!	9/10
The Guardian	4/5 stars
The Observer	3/5 stars
Paste	9.0/10
Pitchfork	8.1/10
Rolling Stone	3/5 stars
Tiny Mix Tapes	3/5 marks

On Your Own Love Again was welcomed with critical applause upon release. On Metacritic, it holds a score of 79 out of 100, indicating "generally favorable reviews", based on 24 reviews.

Fred Thomas for AllMusic lauded the album, praising its songs' "undeniably powerful radiance". Jenn Pelly for Pitchfork called it "gorgeous", seeing it as "more dramatic and distinctive" than her debut. She noted how "its unadorned emotional uncertainty is profound and relatable."

=== Accolades ===
==== Year-end lists ====
Accolades for On Your Own Love Again
Year	Publication	Work	List	Rank	Ref.
2014	Pitchfork	"Back, Baby"	The 100 Best Tracks of 2014	82	
2015	AllMusic	On Your Own Love Again	Favorite Singer/Songwriter Albums	*	
2015	Exclaim!	On Your Own Love Again	Exclaim!'s Top 10 Folk & Country Albums Best of 2015	6	
2015	The Guardian	On Your Own Love Again	The best albums of 2015	33	
2015	Paste	On Your Own Love Again	The 50 Best Albums of 2015	23	

* denotes an unordered list

== Track listing ==
Adapted from Bandcamp.

No.	Title	Length
1.	"Wrong Hand"	3:18
2.	"Game That I Play"	4:15
3.	"Strange Melody"	5:02
4.	"Greycedes"	2:38
5.	"Moon Dude"	3:40
6.	"Jacquelyn in the Background"	3:23
7.	"I've Got a Feeling"	3:50
8.	"Back, Baby"	3:55
9.	"On Your Own Love Again"	1:33
Total length:		31:34

== Personnel ==
Adapted from Exclaim! and AllMusic's Credits page for Love.

Musicians

- Jessica Pratt - composer, electric guitar, engineering, mixing
- Will Canzoneri - clavinet, organ, mixing

Artwork and design

- Colby Droscher - cover photo
