= Something to Give Each Other =

Studio album by Troye Sivan
- Released: 13 October 2023
- Recorded: House Mouse Studios (Stockholm); MXM Studios (Los Angeles); The Pool Recording Studio (London)
- Genres: Pop; electropop
- Length: 32:40
- Labels: EMI Australia; Capitol
- Producers: A. G. Cook; Oscar Görres; Ian Kirkpatrick; Novodor; Styalz Fuego; The Keegster

Troye Sivan chronology
In a Dream (2020)	Something to Give Each Other (2023)	She's the Best (2026)

Singles from Something to Give Each Other
- 1. "Rush" Released: 13 July 2023; 2. "Got Me Started" Released: 20 September 2023; 3. "One of Your Girls" Released: 13 October 2023; 4. "Honey" Released: 17 May 2024

Something to Give Each Other is the third studio album by Australian singer-songwriter Troye Sivan. It was released by EMI Music Australia and Capitol Records on 13 October 2023. It is Sivan's first album release in five years, following Bloom (2018). It features a collaboration with Spanish musician Guitarricadelafuente.

The album received critical acclaim. It was preceded by the lead single "Rush" which entered the top ten in Ireland, Croatia, Japan, Latvia, Lithuania, and Russia. The second single "Got Me Started", entered the charts in nine regions including Australia and the UK. A third single, "One of Your Girls", was released concurrently with the album. It became Sivan's first album and second project to top the ARIA chart in his native Australia, and reached the top ten in Belgium, Germany, Lithuania, the Netherlands, New Zealand, Norway and the UK. It also reached number one on the US Dance/Electronic Albums chart. The album's fourth single, "Honey" was released on 17 May 2024 with remixes by Mura Masa.

At the 2023 J Awards, the album was nominated for Australian Album of the Year, while "Rush" was nominated for Best Dance Pop Recording and Best Music Video at the 66th Annual Grammy Awards; Sivan's first nominations. "Got Me Started" was subsequently nominated for Best Dance Pop Recording at the 67th Annual Grammy Awards. The album was nominated for the 2023 Australian Music Prize. The album was nominated for Best Record at the Rolling Stone Australia Awards. At the 2024 ARIA Music Awards, the album won Album of the Year, Best Pop Release and for Sivan, Best Solo Artist. The album was supported by the Something to Give Each Other Tour, which commenced in May 2024.

== Background ==
Sivan teased the release of the album on 9 June 2023 on Instagram alongside a clip showcasing him throughout different years on a television starting from his first ever upload to YouTube and ending with a teaser for the music video of the album's then upcoming lead single "Rush". Sivan stated in the post caption that he had been making the album for over five years in between various commitments, such as his Bloom tour and the television series The Idol, in which he had a starring role.

Sivan announced the album name and release date and unveiled the cover art on 13 July 2023 on social media.

This album is my something to give you — a kiss on a dancefloor, a date turned into a weekend, a crush, a winter, a summer. Party after party, after party after after party. Heartbreak, freedom. Community, sisterhood, friendship. All that.

— Sivan describing the album

== Composition ==
Something to Give Each Other is primarily a pop album. It consists of both up and down-tempo songs, with the album's overall tempo notably slowing down after its opening track, "Rush". Nick Levine of NME observed that, after "Rush", "the album is mostly midtempo, though with a slightly warmer, gauzier sonic palette than Sivan’s previous albums". In his review of the album, Rolling Stone's Tim Chan described Something to Give Each Other as a pop record on which the singer draws from synth-pop, house, and "Nineties-esque club cuts", while Lauren Dehollogne of Clash described it as electropop. According to Megan McEnery of Her Campus, the album has more prominent influences of house and R&B than Sivan's prior work. Lyrically, the album explores themes such as sensuality, love, and loss. Thematically, Sivan said Something to Give Each Other is about "pop music being able to bring people together", with its title referring to "community built off a common experience of dance music, partying, fashion, humor, and all of these things that I love so much about my life and about my friends".

Sivan has promoted the album as "a celebration of sex, dance, sweat, community, queerness, love and friendship". Variety's Steven J. Horowitz said the album is "equally about grief and being unable to let go of the pain of a relationship’s end" as it is about "sex, relationships and community", identifying "human connection" as its central theme. The singer identified pop divas such as Janet Jackson, Christina Aguilera, and Britney Spears as primary sources of inspiration for the album.

== Cover artwork ==
The album cover features Sivan smiling with his head between a friend's legs. Sivan stated that he wanted to smile for the album cover but did not smile throughout the day of the photoshoot because he felt awkward smiling and did not want his smile to look fake. The shot for the album cover captured when Sivan's friend kneeled down and tickled Sivan's ribs, which provoked a genuine smile.

Due to the cover's suggestive nature, countries such as Saudi Arabia and Indonesia, as well as countries in Eastern Europe, replaced it with the single artwork for "Rush" instead, which features a close-up of Sivan.

== Critical reception ==
Professional ratings
Aggregate scores
Source	Rating
AnyDecentMusic?	8.0/10
Metacritic	84/100
Review scores
Source	Rating
AllMusic	4.5/5 stars
Clash	9/10
The Guardian	4/5 stars
NME	5/5 stars
Pitchfork	8.0/10
Rolling Stone	4/5 stars
Slant Magazine	3.5/5 stars

Something to Give Each Other received widespread acclaim from music critics, who praised its "unapologetic queer" lyricism, production, and vocals. Metacritic, a review aggregation website that assigns a normalised rating out of 100 based on reviews from mainstream publications, assigned the album a score of 84 out of 100 based on 13 critics' reviews.

Ben Beaumont-Thomas of The Guardian called it "one of the year's most distinctive pop albums" and stated that while "there are more high tempos, but where 'Rush' was claustrophobic and orgiastic, other tracks give Sivan more space to move". Writing for Variety, Stephen J. Horowitz opined that the album represents Sivan at his "most realized and forthcoming" and praised the confessional nature of the songwriting.

Sal Cinquemani of Slant Magazine wrote that the album "finds Sivan older, bolder, and, for a large part of its running time, unrepentantly horny" and what it "lacks in poignancy, though, is made up for by the joy with which it embraces queer pleasure". For Rolling Stone, Tim Chan called the album "an ode to queerness and reinvention" as well as "a pristine slice of pop heaven".

Reviewing the album for Clash, Lauren Dehollogne felt that "a wave of bubbling emotion and challenging energy is palpable throughout Something to Give Each Other, but somehow each transition goes over smoothly and not a single track feels out of place" and "each track [...] can evoke a chuckle, a smile, a tear, or a gasp". Nick Levine of NME opined that aside from "Rush", "the album is mostly mid-tempo, though with a slightly warmer, gauzier sonic palette than Sivan's previous albums". He concluded that it is "a strikingly vital pop album charged with love, lust, sweat and regret". Harry Tafoya of Pitchfork found the album to be "a showcase for some dazzling eclecticism" as "ideas that couldn't possibly work on paper are executed skillfully and to often gorgeous effect", commenting that it "scans as less of a reinvention than a gradual honing of Sivan's craft".

=== Year-end lists ===
Select year-end rankings of Something to Give Each Other
Publication	Accolade	Rank	Ref.
Billboard	The 50 Best Albums of 2023: Staff List	3	
The Guardian	The 50 Best Albums of 2023	13	
The Evening Standard	The Albums of the Year 2023	3	
NME	The Best Albums of 2023	4	
PopMatters	The 20 Best Pop Albums of 2023	11	
The Hollywood Reporter	The 10 Best Albums of 2023	7	
Nylon	Nylon's Top Albums of 2023	4	

== Commercial performance ==
Something to Give Each Other debuted at number one in Australia, making it Sivan's highest-charting studio album in his home country. It opened at number 20 on the US Billboard 200 with 31,000 album-equivalent units, including 16,000 pure album sales. In addition to the album's singles charting internationally, three album tracks ("What's the Time Where You Are?", "In My Room", and "Still Got It") all charted on the Official New Zealand Music Chart, and additional songs ("Silly", and "Honey"), alongside "What's the Time Where You Are?" placed on the US Billboard Dance/Electronic Songs chart.

== Track listing ==
Something to Give Each Other track listing
No.	Title	Writer(s)	Producer(s)	Length
1.	"Rush"	Troye Sivan Mellet; Brett McLaughlin; Adam Novodor; Alex Chapman; Kaelyn Behr; Kevin Hickey	Zhone; Novodor; Styalz Fuego	2:36
2.	"What's the Time Where You Are?"	Mellet; McLaughlin; Oscar Görres	Görres	3:23
3.	"One of Your Girls"	Mellet; McLaughlin; Görres	Görres	3:01
4.	"In My Room" (featuring Guitarricadelafuente)	Mellet; McLaughlin; Görres; Álvaro Lafuente Calvo	Görres	3:13
5.	"Still Got It"	Mellet; Görres	Görres	3:28
6.	"Can't Go Back, Baby"	Mellet; McLaughlin; Görres; Jessica Pratt; Nick Ward	Görres	3:21
7.	"Got Me Started"	Mellet; Behr; McLaughlin; Chris Stracey; Ian Kirkpatrick; Jack Glass; Tayla Parx	Kirkpatrick; Fuego^{[v]}	3:18
8.	"Silly"	Mellet; McLaughlin; Kirkpatrick	Kirkpatrick; Fuego^{[v]}	3:38
9.	"Honey"	Mellet; McLaughlin; Görres; Behr	Görres; Fuego	3:26
10.	"How to Stay with You"	Mellet; McLaughlin; Görres; Alexander Cook	Görres; A. G. Cook	3:16
Total length:				32:40

Notes

- ^{^[v]} signifies a vocal producer.
- The deluxe soft pack CD & deluxe webstore vinyl copies of the album contain the extended version of "Rush" (3:35).
- "Can't Go Back, Baby" samples from "Back, Baby", written and performed by Jessica Pratt.
- "Got Me Started" samples from "Shooting Stars", written by Jack Glass and Chris Stracey and performed by Bag Raiders.

== Personnel ==
Musicians

- Troye Sivan – vocals (all tracks), background vocals (tracks 2, 3, 5, 6, 9, 10), vibraphone (6)
- Zhone – vocals, background vocals (1, 9)
- Adam Novodor – background vocals (1, 9)
- Alex Chapman – background vocals (1, 9)
- Oscar Görres – bass, drums, percussion, programming (2, 3, 5, 6, 9, 10); guitar (2, 3, 5, 6, 9), keyboards (2, 3, 6, 9, 10), background vocals (2, 3, 6), timpani (3), string arrangement (4); organ, piano (5)
- Jason Minnaar – spoken word (2)
- Santa Ouhamou Portillo – spoken word (2)
- Sofía Gallini – spoken word (2)
- David Bukovinszky – cello (4)
- Mattias Bylund – string arrangement, synthesiser (4)
- Karl Guner – synthesiser (4)
- Hanna Helgegren – violin (4)
- Mattias Johansson – violin (4)
- Guitarricadelafuente – vocals (4)
- Styalz Fuego – keyboards, programming (9)
- A. G. Cook – keyboards (10)
- Henki Skidu – saxophone (10)

Technical

- Randy Merrill – mastering
- Alex Ghenea – mixing (1, 4, 7–9)
- Serban Ghenea – mixing (2, 3, 5, 6, 10)
- John Hanes – immersive mix engineering
- Bryce Bordone – engineering (2, 3, 5, 6, 10)

== Charts ==
=== Weekly charts ===
Weekly chart performance for Something to Give Each Other
Chart (2023–2024)	Peak position
Australian Albums (ARIA)	1
Austrian Albums (Ö3 Austria)	30
Belgian Albums (Ultratop Flanders)	7
Belgian Albums (Ultratop Wallonia)	17
Canadian Albums (Billboard)	29
Croatian International Albums (HDU)	5
Danish Albums (Hitlisten)	13
Dutch Albums (Album Top 100)	3
Finnish Albums (Suomen virallinen lista)	13
French Albums (SNEP)	60
German Albums (Offizielle Top 100)	9
Greek Albums (IFPI)	39
Hungarian Albums (MAHASZ)	33
Icelandic Albums (Tónlistinn)	11
Irish Albums (Official Charts)	13
Italian Albums (FIMI)	55
Lithuanian Albums (AGATA)	4
New Zealand Albums (RMNZ)	2
Norwegian Albums (VG-lista)	9
Polish Albums (ZPAV)	11
Portuguese Albums (AFP)	30
Scottish Albums (Official Charts)	5
Spanish Albums (Promusicae)	13
Swedish Albums (Sverigetopplistan)	16
Swiss Albums (Schweizer Hitparade)	14
UK Albums (Official Charts)	4
US Billboard 200	20
US Top Dance Albums (Billboard)	1

=== Year-end charts ===
2023 year-end chart performance for Something to Give Each Other
Chart (2023)	Position
Australian Artist Albums (ARIA)	11

2024 year-end chart performance for Something to Give Each Other
Chart (2024)	Position
Australian Artist Albums (ARIA)	5
US Top Dance/Electronic Albums (Billboard)	5

2025 year-end chart performance for Something to Give Each Other
Chart (2025)	Position
Australian Artist Albums (ARIA)	23

== Certifications ==
Certifications for Something to Give Each Other
Region	Certification	Certified units/sales
Australia (ARIA)	Gold	35,000^{‡}
Brazil (Pro-Música Brasil)	Gold	20,000^{‡}
Canada (Music Canada)	Gold	40,000^{‡}
Denmark (IFPI Danmark)	Gold	10,000^{‡}
New Zealand (RMNZ)	Gold	7,500^{‡}
Poland (ZPAV)	Gold	10,000^{‡}
United Kingdom (BPI)	Silver	60,000^{‡}
^{‡} Sales+streaming figures based on certification alone.
