= Parc del Fòrum =

Public park in Catalonia, Spain

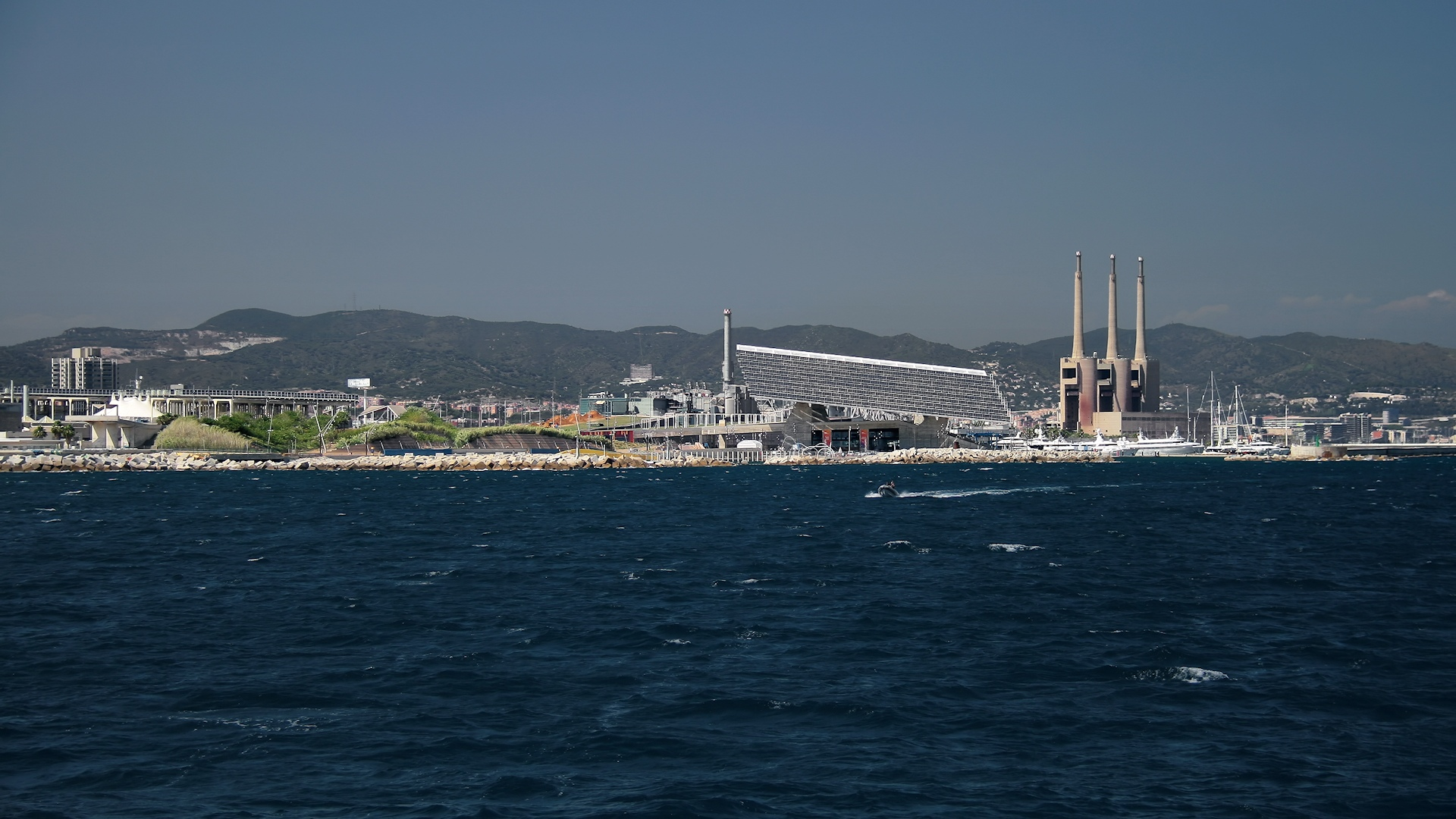
- Parc del Fòrum seen from the Mediterranean Sea.
- Interactive map of Parc del Fòrum
- Type: Public park
- Location: Barcelona, Spain
- Coordinates: 41°24′40.75″N 2°13′28.57″E
- Area: 14 acres (5.7 ha)
- Created: 2004
- Operator: Ajuntament de Barcelona
- Public transit: at El Maresme – Fòrum
- Website: www.parcdelforum.cat/es/

Parc del Fòrum (Catalan for Forum Park) is a public park located between the district of Sant Martí in Barcelona and Sant Adrià de Besòs. It was built in 2004 following Elías Torres's and José Antonio Martínez Lapeñas's original design in order to hold the international cultural event Fòrum Universal de les Cultures, celebrated in 2004. It is operated by Ajuntament de Barcelona and Barcelona de Serveis Municipals.

== History ==
The Parc del Fòrum hosted the Universal Forum of Cultures, held in Barcelona during 2004. The event, devised by the city's then-mayor Joan Clos, caused an intense controversy in the city due to allegations of urban speculation that were never substantiated. The original plan had been for a marine zoo. The event allowed new urban changes in the city: the entire Besós area was recovered, until then populated by old disused factories, the entire Poblenou neighborhood was regenerated and the new Diagonal Mar neighborhood was built, while it was equipped the city of new parks and spaces for the leisure of citizens. The site was designed by Elías Torres and José Antonio Martínez Lapeña, which highlights a multipurpose esplanade of 16 hectares culminated at one end by a large solar panel, which became one of the emblems of the event and gives electric energy to 140 families nowadays.

The main structure was the Fòrum Building (2000–2004), by Jacques Herzog and Pierre de Meuron — current headquarters of the Natural Sciences Museum of Barcelona. It has a triangular footprint with several interior courtyards that generate open spaces, and a textured façade of indigo blue, with bands of glass criss-crossed over its surface. Next to this building was the International Convention Center of Barcelona (2000–2004), by Josep Lluís Mateo, with an irregular metal layout and undulating shapes that hide the supporting structures, creating a large, open interior with a flexible floor plan.

== Spaces ==
The main space consists of a huge esplanade called Plaça del Fòrum (Forum Square), designed by Torres and Lapeña. It is the site where the solar panel is located as well as some pieces of public art like "Los Pajaritos" or the "Bosc de Columnes" (Column Forest), which is mainly used for ludic events.

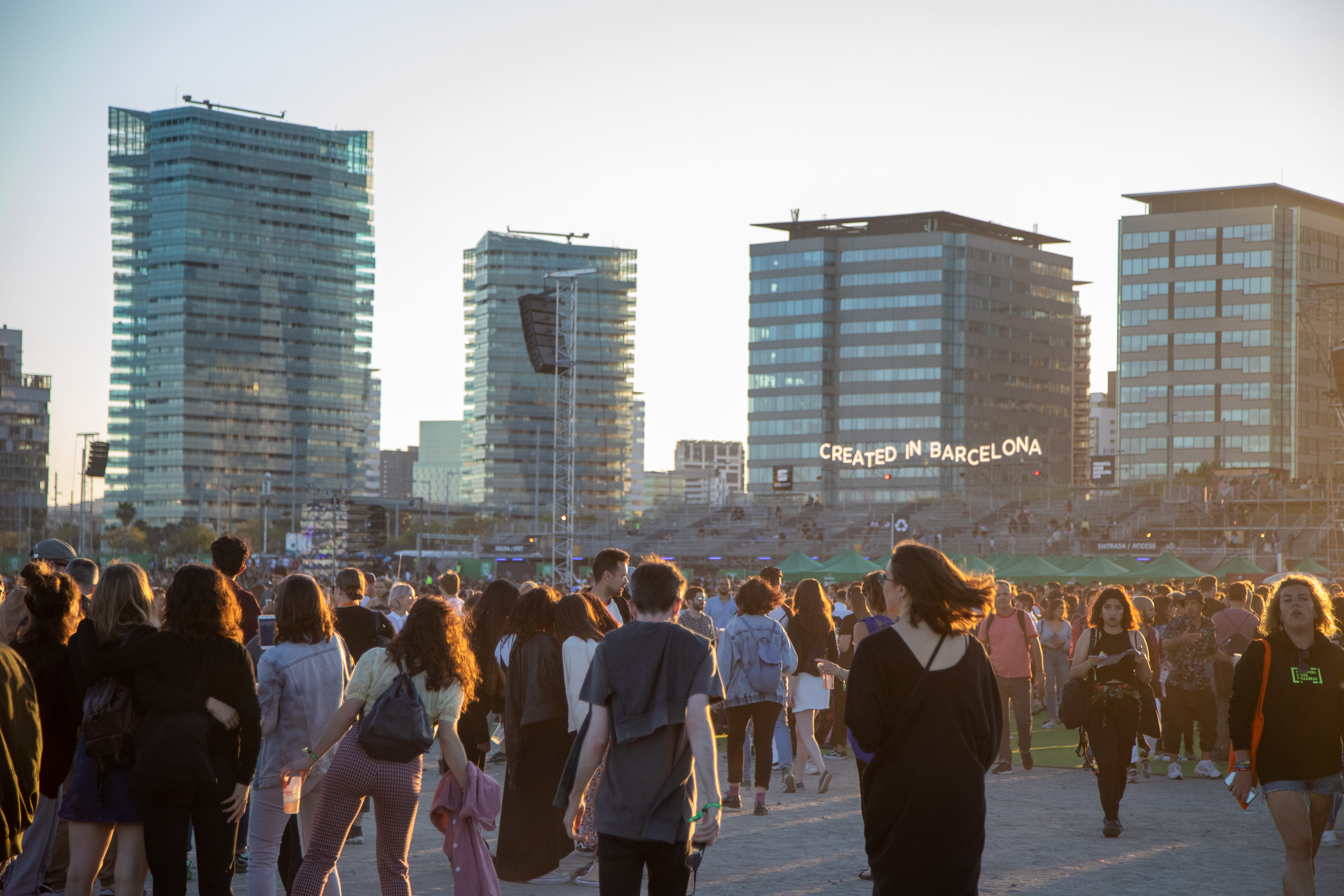
People walking in the Parc del Fòrum.

The Parc del Fòrum also includes:

- Parc del Camp de la Bota: located in the old neighbourhood of Campo de la Bota. It occupies the space where its castle was located. The castle was used to execute and torture people during the Francoist dictatorship (1936–1975). Nowadays it hosts a park for kids, the "column forest" as well as some pieces of public art and a monument that commemorates those who were murdered in the castle. Barcelona's Natural Science Museum is located there as well as the Auditori del Fòrum, which has a maximum capacity of 3,300 people.
- Parc dels Auditoris (Auditorium Complex): designed by Alejandro Zaera, this space hosts two public air auditoriums meant to host concerts and other types of shows.
- Plataforma Marina: originally built to host a marine zoo (but cancelled due to the 2008 financial crisis), this flat platform is used to host many shows like Cirque du Soleil's "Messi 10" show or Primavera Sound's biggest stage.
- Zona de Banys (Bathing Area): designed by Beth Galí and Jaume Benavent, it is a two-hectare sand-free beach providing access to the sea. It has ladders and ramps in order to make it look like a pool and to guarantee the security of the swimmers. A breakwater protects the area from the surf and forms an artificial island known as Pangea. Sun beds, parasols, showers and locker rooms are also part of this space alongside other amenities and services.

The zone closer to Sant Adrià consists of the Forum Beach, a marina, restaurants, a natural park and an active factory.

== Use ==
Since the 2004 Universal Forum of Cultures, the park has hosted many events as well as worldwide known music festivals. Here are some:

- Barcelona Acció Musical: part of the Festes de la Mercè that consists of a series of musical shows is sometimes held at the Parc del Fòrum during its annual celebration in September.
- Barcelona Beach Festival: also known as BBF, it took place at the Forum Beach every July, until 2023. It brought together the biggest artists in electronic music.

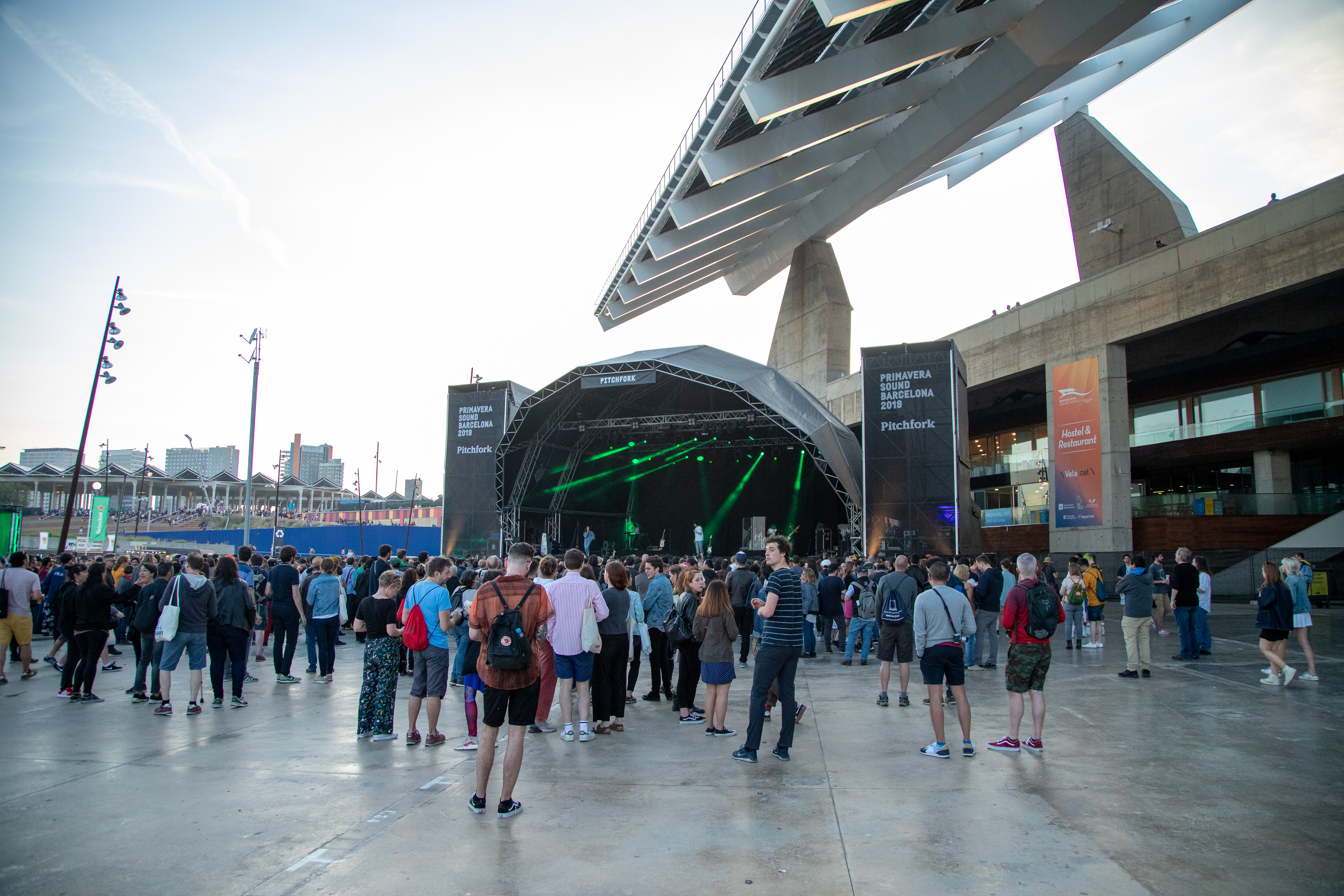
Parc del Fòrum during Primavera Sound.

- Festival Cruïlla Barcelona: the music festival moved to Barcelona in 2010, leaving Mataró. Calle 13, Love of Lesbian, M.I.A., Vetusta Morla, Of Monsters and Men, Kendrick Lamar, Emeli Sandé, Txarango, Pet Shop Boys, Two Door Cinema Club, LP, Zaz, The Roots, The Black Eyed Peas and Gwen Stefani among others have visited the festival.
- Nits del Fòrum: comprising 70 concerts in over two months, this concert series festival at the Auditorium Complex took place during Summer in 2020. It was organized by Primavera Sound.
- Primavera Sound: the worldwide known indie and alternative music festival has taken place annually between the end of May and the beginning of June in the park since 2005, with the exception of 2020 and 2021. In 2022 the festival took place over the course of two weekends. It is contracted to take place in the Fòrum at least until 2030. Over 200 acts play at the festival every year in over 15 stages located around the Park, as well as the Auditori on the Fòrum Building. Musical icons such as Arctic Monkeys, Beck, Gorillaz, The Strokes, Tame Impala, Miley Cyrus, Lorde, Bjork, Rosalía, Arcade Fire, The xx, My Bloody Valentine, Bon Iver, Charli XCX, Chappell Roan, Sabrina Carpenter, The Cure and Radiohead have headlined the festival since its first edition in 2001.
- Reggaeton Beach Festival: this Latin music festival took place annually in July. It featured the biggest artists in the reggaeton genre like Becky G, Ozuna, Daddy Yankee, Karol G, Rels B etc. Other editions took place in Benidorm, Palma and Madrid.
- Summercase: the festival ran from 2006 to 2008 and also visited Madrid. Primal Scream and Sex Pistols visited the festival.
- Telecogresca: the biggest music festival for university students from the Telecom BCN has taken place at the Parc del Fòrum since 2014, around March–April. The line-up normally consists of Catalan rumba and hip hop acts.

== See also ==
- Urban planning of Barcelona

== Sources ==
- Bahamón, Alejandro; Losantos, Àgata (2007). Barcelona. Atlas histórico de arquitectura (in Spanish). Barelona: Parramón. ISBN 978-84-342-2945-7.
- Lecea, Ignasi de; Fabre, Jaume; Grandas, Carme; Huertas, Josep M.; Remesar, Antoni; Sobrequés, Jaume (2009). Art públic de Barcelona (in Catalan). Barcelona: Ayuntamiento de Barcelona y Àmbit Serveis Editorials. ISBN 978-84-96645-08-0.
- Miralles, Roger; Sierra, Pau (2012). Barcelona, arquitectura contemporánea 1979-2012 (in Spanish). Barcelona: Polígrafa. ISBN 978-84-343-1307-1.
- Pla, Maurici (2007). Catalunya. Guia d'arquitectura moderna 1880-2007 (in Spanish). Sant Lluís (Menorca): Triangle. ISBN 978-84-8478-007-6 – via Internet Archive.
- Sánchez Vidiella, Àlex; Zamora Mola, Francesc (2011). Paisatgisme urbà. Barcelona (in Catalan). Barcelona: Ajuntament de Barcelona. ISBN 978-84-9850-355-5.
