= One of Your Girls =

- Sped up version cover

Single by Troye Sivan

from the album Something to Give Each Other
- Released: 31 October 2023
- Genre: Pop; synth pop; funk
- Length: 3:01
- Label: EMI; Capitol
- Songwriters: Troye Sivan; Leland; Oscar Görres
- Producer: Oscar Görres

Troye Sivan singles chronology
"Got Me Started" (2023)	"One of Your Girls" (2023)	"Honey" (2024)

Music video
- "One of Your Girls" on YouTube

"One of Your Girls" is a song by Australian singer Troye Sivan from his third studio album Something to Give Each Other (2023). It was released through EMI and Capitol as the third single on 31 October 2023.

At the APRA Music Awards of 2025, the song was shortlisted for Song of the Year.

== Background ==
The music video for the song was teased at a listening party for the album, hosted by Spotify at the Manhattan nightclub Outer Heaven.

== Lyrics and composition ==
The song was written about Sivan's sexual encounters with men who previously considered themselves straight but were questioning and "wanted to experiment". Sivan was inspired by the conflicting feelings these experiences brought, particularly emptiness and vulnerability after the encounters. At the listening party, Sivan elaborated on how he believed his internalised homophobia led him to these men, describing "the sort of fantasy of it all, the attraction of it all, me bending myself to be what I think you might want".

Sivan wrote the song with Leland and Oscar Görres, the latter who produced it. Sivan liked the idea of an "apathetic sad robot voice" singing the chorus with him to reflect the feeling of emptiness after the relationships that are the direct inspirations for the song. Sivan's voice in the chorus is coloured by a vocoder.

Sivan stated that Max Martin came in the studio and they played songs for him. When he heard "One of Your Girls", he stood up, asked them to play it again, gave the song a glowing review and then walked up to the keyboards and started playing a synth line though he asked to be uncredited for his contribution.

In a 2024 episode of the podcast Song Exploder focused on the song, Sivan revealed that the ideas for the name of the song and the vocoder used in the chorus came from his work on the television series The Idol. The name was inspired by the song "One of the Girls" featured in the series, and the vocoder was inspired by a YouTube video Sivan's co-star The Weeknd showed him during filming; the video depicted a robot singing sadly into a microphone.

== Music video ==
The song's music video, directed by Gordon von Steiner, was released concurrently with the single on 13 October. The video begins fully in black and white, with clips of Sivan singing to the camera. Beginning at the first chorus, Sivan appears in a drag persona, dancing sensually in various lingerie looks, and the video is predominantly in colour.

The video features a shirtless Ross Lynch as the love interest, receiving a lap dance from Sivan. Regarding Lynch's appearance, Sivan commented, "The song is written so adoringly about these guys that everyone is obsessed with—and everyone's obsessed with Ross." Lynch joined Sivan during his concert at Wembley Arena in London to perform the song and recreate his role from the music video during Sivan's performance.

Sivan told People that the video was the first time he performed in drag. Sivan described how he wanted to create a conventionally attractive "fantasy version" of himself. Dara Allen, the stylist for the video, confirmed in an Instagram post that Sivan's look was a homage to Britney Spears and her work with costume designers Kurt and Bart. James Factora of Them disputed the label of "drag" for the performance, claiming that the term "implies a campiness or element of parody that isn’t present in the video".

== Reception ==
Shaad D'Souza of The Guardian described the song as "starry-eyed, sexy and forlorn".

Critics' rankings of "One of Your Girls"
Publication	List	Rank	Ref.
Business Insider	The Best Songs of 2023	5	
Paper	Paper's Favorite Songs of 2023	—N/a	
Slant Magazine	The 50 Best Songs of 2023	6	

== Charts ==
=== Weekly charts ===
Weekly chart performance for "One of Your Girls"
Chart (2023–2024)	Peak position
Australia (ARIA)	24
Canada Hot 100 (Billboard)	42
Denmark (Tracklisten)	38
Estonia Airplay (TopHit)	3
Finland (Suomen virallinen lista)	38
Global 200 (Billboard)	43
Greece International (IFPI)	21
Iceland (Tónlistinn)	18
Ireland (IRMA)	9
Latvia Airplay (LaIPA)	4
Lithuania (AGATA)	20
Netherlands (Single Top 100)	45
Netherlands (Tipparade)	17
New Zealand (Recorded Music NZ)	17
Norway (VG-lista)	13
Poland (Polish Streaming Top 100)	70
Portugal (AFP)	92
San Marino (SMRRTV Top 50)	40
Singapore (RIAS)	20
South Korea BGM (Circle)	68
Sweden (Sverigetopplistan)	26
Switzerland (Schweizer Hitparade)	65
UK Singles (Official Charts)	11
US Billboard Hot 100	79
US Pop Airplay (Billboard)	32

=== Monthly charts ===
Monthly chart performance for "One of Your Girls"
Chart (2024)	Peak position
Estonia Airplay (TopHit)	7

=== Year-end charts ===
2023 year-end chart performance for "One of Your Girls"
Chart (2023)	Position
Estonia Airplay (TopHit)	155

2024 year-end chart performance for "One of Your Girls"
Chart (2024)	Position
Australian Artist (ARIA)	46
Estonia Airplay (TopHit)	60

== Certifications ==
Region	Certification	Certified units/sales
Australia (ARIA)	Platinum	70,000^{‡}
Brazil (Pro-Música Brasil)	2× Platinum	80,000^{‡}
Canada (Music Canada)	Platinum	80,000^{‡}
Denmark (IFPI Danmark)	Gold	45,000^{‡}
New Zealand (RMNZ)	Platinum	30,000^{‡}
Poland (ZPAV)	Gold	25,000^{‡}
United Kingdom (BPI)	Silver	200,000^{‡}
^{‡} Sales+streaming figures based on certification alone.

== Release history ==
Release dates and formats for "One of Your Girls"
Region	Date	Format(s)	Version	Label	Ref.
United States	31 October 2023	Contemporary hit radio	Original	Capitol	
Various	8 December 2023	Digital download; streaming	Sped up	EMI; Capitol	
Various	15 December 2023	Digital download; streaming	Felix Jaehn remix	EMI; Capitol	
Italy	15 December 2023	Radio airplay	Original	Universal	
