= Rush (Troye Sivan song) =

Single by Troye Sivan

from the album Something to Give Each Other
- Released: 13 July 2023
- Genre: House-pop
- Length: 2:36
- Label: EMI; Capitol
- Composers: Alex Chapman; Kaelyn Behr; Adam Novodor; Kevin Hickey
- Lyricists: Troye Sivan; Brett Leland McLaughlin
- Producers: Styalz Fuego; Novodor; Zhone

Troye Sivan singles chronology
"You Know What I Need" (2022)	"Rush" (2023)	"Got Me Started" (2023)

Music video
- "Rush" on YouTube

"Rush" is a song by Australian singer Troye Sivan. It was released through EMI and Capitol on 13 July 2023, as the lead single from his third studio album Something to Give Each Other. The accompanying music video, shot in Berlin, was released the same day. The video shows athletic men and women dancing and drinking in the summer heat.

The song was nominated for the inaugural Best Pop Dance Recording and Best Music Video at the 66th Annual Grammy Awards, the first nominations of Sivan's career. At the 2023 ARIA Music Awards, the song also earned Sivan the award for Best Solo Artist, while the song also won Song of the Year, Best Produced Release and Best Engineered Release and was nominated for Best Pop Release. At the APRA Music Awards of 2024, the song won Song of the Year.

== Background ==
Sivan first previewed the song in June 2023, revealing the title and credits. In an accompanying Instagram post, the singer apologised for making his fans wait five years for new solo music. The title of the song was partly inspired by a poppers brand of the same name, yet also describes the feeling of dancing with "someone hot". According to Sivan, the song is meant to reflect his experiences of feeling "confident, free and liberated", while being the "most connected to the music and community" surrounding him. He elaborated:

"Rush" is the feeling of kissing a sweaty stranger on a dancefloor, a 2 hour date that turned into a weekend, a crush, a winter, a summer.

— Sivan on the topic of the song,

== Critical reception ==
Best-song-of-the-year rankings
Publication	Rank
Billboard	7
The Guardian	5
i-D	11
NME	16
ourculture	10
Pitchfork	9
Rolling Stone	51
Slant Magazine	15

"Rush" was critically acclaimed upon release, with publications like Associated Press considering it one of the best songs of 2023. Michael Sun of The Guardian believed "Australia is in its gay era", thanks to the back-to-back releases of "Rush" and Kylie Minogue's "Padam Padam", and described Sivan's track as "pure gay smut: a paean to poppers inspired [...] by the sweaty clubs of Melbourne's Smith Street. Ben Beaumont-Thomas of the same publication compared its funky house rhythm to Spiller's "Groovejet", writing, "with a rowdy chorus chanted as if by a troupe of distractingly buff personal trainers, it's all sweat and heavy breathing". Shaad D'Souza of Pitchfork awarded the song their "Best New Track" distinction and observed that "Rush" is "unconcerned with anything but pure ecstasy". D'Souza highlighted the chorus and the associated "homoeroticism of a football chant" paired with a "piano-house beat". The writer went on to praise the singer for producing a "sublime, orgiastic summer anthem". Kaelen Bell of Exclaim! found Sivan's "horny new single" a "thumping, kinetic dance banger". Writing for Dork, Stephen Ackroyd called it "a bum-slapping bop" and "the most fun you'll have all summer". Jason P. Frank of Vulture also found it a "bop", while thinking it works better with the music video, and added: "This is a song meant for partying through the heat, for doing a substance or two, for turning the dance floor into a make-out sesh."

In an opposing opinion, Vulture's Choire Sicha said his "immediate response was revulsion" upon hearing the song, and listed the particular aspects of "Rush" that the hated the most: "The retro, clumpy high-house chaka-chaka beat; the '70s Village People backup chorus anthem singing; the overproduction of his vocals into pure Jocelynism; the whooshy club bridge sound effect."

== Music video ==
The music video was released on 13 July 2023. Directed by Gordon von Steiner, it was filmed in Berlin and produced by the Berlin production company BWGTBLD. Larisha Paul of Rolling Stone observed that the characters only fixate on "wordless communication", as they only speak "through looks and movement", building around the motif of "unconditional and all-consuming love". Two versions of the video were released. The main video is available in most countries, whilst a secondary version was released and geo-restricted to other countries such as the United Arab Emirates, Saudi Arabia, Malaysia, and Indonesia.

The video was generally well-received for its unapologetic queerness, choreography, and references to LGBTQ+ culture. Michael Sun of The Guardian felt "the video is practically bacchanalian, composed mostly of waifish queers twirling. 'Rush' brims with ludicrous sexuality and bawdy bravado. It is, perhaps, the best defence of twink rights." Ben Beaumont-Thomas of the same publication wrote that the video, "full of glory holes, hot bodies and lustful looks, underlines the kind of blood-pumping activity Sivan is getting at." In an interview with Sivan on Apple Music, Travis Mills said the visual was "beautifully shot", and reminded him of Britney Spears' music video for "I'm a Slave 4 U". It has also been compared to Christina Aguilera's "Dirrty" music video.

The video did however receive some criticism for a lack of body diversity amongst its dancers. Sivan responded to the backlash and said, "to be honest, it just wasn't a thought we had — we obviously weren't saying, 'We want to have one specific type of person in the video.' We just made the video, and there wasn't a ton of thought put behind that." After Sivan's reaction, Mier wrote "Sivan's response is definitely believable, and I respect him for being honest. It is concerning, however, that no one in his cohort of queer friends (or fellow creatives) thought this decision could lead to controversy and division." Mier also said he was willing to give Sivan some "grace."

Vulture's Choire Sicha opined "the video has all the subtlety of a 1990s Calvin Klein campaign. It's a return to body fascism and emaciation — two gay tastes that actually never went out of style. Eat something, stupid twinks!" Sivan slammed the body shaming aimed towards him, saying, "There was this article [...] and they were talking about [the lack of body diversity], and in the same sentence, this person said 'Eat something, you stupid twinks.' That really bummed me out to read that — because I've had my own insecurities with my body image. I think that everyone's body is as beautiful as it is, including my own, and it just sucks to see people talking about other people's bodies."

== Accolades ==
Awards and nominations for "Rush"
Year	Organization	Award	Result	Ref.
2023	ARIA Music Awards	Song of the Year	Won	
2023	ARIA Music Awards	Best Pop Release	Nominated	
2023	ARIA Music Awards	Best Produced Release	Won	
2023	ARIA Music Awards	Best Engineered Release	Won	
2023	MTV Video Music Awards	Song of Summer	Nominated	
2024	Grammy Awards	Best Pop Dance Recording	Nominated	
2024	Grammy Awards	Best Music Video	Nominated	
2024	APRA Music Awards	Song of the Year	Won	
2024	MTV Video Music Awards	Best Choreography	Nominated	

== Track listing ==
- Digital download and streaming
1. "Rush" – 2:36
- Digital download and streaming (Remixes EP)
1. "Rush" (extended) – 3:36
2. "Rush" (Big Freedia remix) – 2:36
3. "Rush" (Punctual remix) – 3:33
4. "Rush" (Tom Santa remix) – 2:23
5. "Rush" (Leland remix) – 3:17
6. "Rush" (Big Freedia remix / dub mix) – 4:43
- Digital download and streaming (PinkPantheress and Hyunjin remix)
1. "Rush" (featuring PinkPantheress and Hyunjin of Stray Kids) – 2:52
- CD
1. "Rush" (featuring PinkPantheress and Hyunjin of Stray Kids) – 2:52
2. "Rush" – 2:36
3. "Rush" (extended) – 3:36
4. "Rush" (Punctual remix) – 3:33
5. "Rush" (Leland remix) – 3:17
- 7"

Side A

1. "Rush" – 2:36

Side B

1. "Rush" (Big Freedia remix) – 2:36

== Charts ==
=== Weekly charts ===
Weekly chart performance for "Rush"
Chart (2023)	Peak position
Australia (ARIA)	12
Australia Dance (ARIA)	1
Austria (Ö3 Austria Top 40)	59
Belarus Airplay (TopHit)	4
Belgium (Ultratop 50 Wallonia)	39
Canada Hot 100 (Billboard)	40
CIS Airplay (TopHit)	4
Croatia International Airplay (Top lista)	6
Czech Republic Singles Digital (ČNS IFPI)	30
Estonia Airplay (TopHit)	7
France (SNEP)	185
Germany (GfK)	85
Global 200 (Billboard)	34
Greece International (IFPI)	15
Iceland (Tónlistinn)	30
Ireland (IRMA)	8
Israel Airplay (Media Forest)	1
Japan Hot Overseas (Billboard Japan)	15
Kazakhstan Airplay (TopHit)	4
Latvia (LaIPA)	10
Latvia Airplay (LaIPA)	3
Lithuania (AGATA)	8
Moldova Airplay (TopHit)	58
Netherlands (Dutch Top 40)	30
Netherlands (Single Top 100)	35
New Zealand (Recorded Music NZ)	22
Poland (Polish Airplay Top 100)	30
Poland (Polish Streaming Top 100)	27
Portugal (AFP)	72
Russia Airplay (TopHit)	5
San Marino Airplay (SMRTV Top 50)	25
Serbia Airplay (Radiomonitor)	19
Slovakia Singles Digital (ČNS IFPI)	33
South Korea BGM (Circle)	55
South Korea Download (Circle)	154
Suriname (Nationale Top 40)	4
Sweden (Sverigetopplistan)	61
Switzerland (Schweizer Hitparade)	65
Turkey International Airplay (Radiomonitor Türkiye)	5
Ukraine Airplay (TopHit)	87
UK Singles (Official Charts)	21
US Billboard Hot 100	77
US Hot Dance/Electronic Songs (Billboard)	2

Weekly chart performance for "Rush" (remix)
Chart (2023–2024)	Peak position
Belarus Airplay (TopHit)	118
CIS Airplay (TopHit)	184
Estonia Airplay (TopHit)	41
Japan Hot Overseas (Billboard Japan)	20
Kazakhstan Airplay (TopHit)	152
Latvia Airplay (TopHit)	91
Lithuania Airplay (TopHit)	31
New Zealand Hot Singles (RMNZ)	12
Russia Airplay (TopHit)	213

=== Monthly charts ===
Monthly chart performance for "Rush"
Chart (2023)	Peak position
Belarus Airplay (TopHit)	4
CIS Airplay (TopHit)	7
Estonia Airplay (TopHit)	9
Kazakhstan Airplay (TopHit)	14
Lithuania Airplay (TopHit)	8
Moldova Airplay (TopHit)	99
Russia Airplay (TopHit)	6
Slovakia (Singles Digitál Top 100)	89

=== Year-end charts ===
2023 year-end chart performance for "Rush"
Chart (2023)	Position
Australian Artist (ARIA)	8
Belarus Airplay (TopHit)	49
CIS Airplay (TopHit)	37
Estonia Airplay (TopHit)	48
Kazakhstan Airplay (TopHit)	102
Russia Airplay (TopHit)	35
US Hot Dance/Electronic Songs (Billboard)	15

2024 year-end chart performance for "Rush"
Chart (2024)	Position
Australia Dance (ARIA)	12
Belarus Airplay (TopHit)	80
CIS Airplay (TopHit)	130
Estonia Airplay (TopHit)	119
Lithuania Airplay (TopHit)	19
Russia Airplay (TopHit)	123
US Hot Dance/Electronic Songs (Billboard)	33

2025 year-end chart performance for "Rush"
Chart (2025)	Position
Lithuania Airplay (TopHit)	82

== Certifications ==
Certifications for "Rush"
Region	Certification	Certified units/sales
Australia (ARIA)	3× Platinum	210,000^{‡}
Belgium (BRMA)	Gold	20,000^{‡}
Brazil (Pro-Música Brasil)	Diamond	160,000^{‡}
Canada (Music Canada)	2× Platinum	160,000^{‡}
Denmark (IFPI Danmark)	Gold	45,000^{‡}
France (SNEP)	Gold	100,000^{‡}
Italy (FIMI)	Gold	50,000^{‡}
New Zealand (RMNZ)	Platinum	30,000^{‡}
Poland (ZPAV)	Platinum	50,000^{‡}
Spain (Promusicae)	Gold	30,000^{‡}
United Kingdom (BPI)	Platinum	600,000^{‡}
^{‡} Sales+streaming figures based on certification alone.

== Release history ==
Release dates and formats for "Rush"
Region	Date	Format(s)	Version	Label	Ref.
Various	13 July 2023	Digital download; streaming	Original	EMI; Capitol	
Italy	14 July 2023	Radio airplay	Original	Universal	
Various	18 August 2023	Digital download; streaming	Remixes	EMI; Capitol	
Various	31 August 2023	Digital download; streaming	PinkPantheress and Hyunjin remix	EMI; Capitol	
Australia	19 October 2023	CD	Exclusive Maxi Single	EMI; Capitol	
United States	20 October 2023	LP	Exclusive & Limited Glory Edition 7"	EMI; Capitol	
Australia	30 November 2023	LP	Exclusive & Limited Glory Edition 7"	EMI; Capitol	
United States	1 December 2023	CD	Exclusive Maxi Single	EMI; Capitol	
