= Got Me Started =

Single by Troye Sivan

from the album Something to Give Each Other
- Released: 20 September 2023
- Genre: UK garage
- Length: 3:18
- Label: EMI; Capitol
- Songwriters: Troye Sivan; Brett Leland McLaughlin; Taylor Parks; Kaelyn Behr; Jack Glass; Chris Stracey; Ian Kirkpatrick
- Producer: Ian Kirkpatrick

Troye Sivan singles chronology
"Rush" (2023)	"Got Me Started" (2023)	"One of Your Girls" (2023)

Music video
- "Got Me Started" on YouTube

"Got Me Started" is a song by Australian singer Troye Sivan. It was released through EMI and Capitol on 20 September 2023 as the second single from his third studio album, Something to Give Each Other. It samples "Shooting Stars" (2009) by Australian electronic duo Bag Raiders.

At the 2024 ARIA Music Awards, the song was nominated for and won Song of the Year. "Got Me Started" also received a nomination for Best Dance Pop Recording at the 67th Annual Grammy Awards.

At the APRA Music Awards of 2025, the song was nominated for Most Performed Australian Work and Most Performed Pop Work.

== Background ==
Describing the creation process, Sivan explained: "When we were writing this song, I was emphatic about using 'Shooting Stars'—I just kept humming it in the studio. It's a huge sample and was a big ask; and I knew that they had never approved it in the past. So I'm over the moon about the opportunity to sample that track because this song is iconic to me. And then we have Ian Kirkpatrick on production, who is a genius. I love his work – he had this plan to record the vocal at a slower speed and then speed it up, and ultimately that's what you hear in the chorus. I instantly loved the way it sounded."

Sivan explained that sampling "Shooting Stars" came naturally while he and his team were working on the song in the studio but that he did not actually believe that Bag Raiders members Jack Glass and Chris Stracey would allow him to use the track in the final version. Discussing how he convinced them to give him permission, Sivan stated "It was one of the first songs that we wrote for the album and it just stuck around. They [Bag Raiders] were like, 'By the way, we've had hundreds of requests and we've never said 'yeah,' so don't fuck this up.' And I was like, 'I promise you, I'm going to make a video. It's going to be sick.' Like, I really believe in this."

== Music video ==
The song's music video, directed by Gordon von Steiner, was released concurrently with the single on 20 September. Shot in Bangkok, Thailand, the video includes various clips of Sivan, featuring him walking and running through the city, sitting nude in a bathhouse, flying up the side of a building and engaging in choreography with several dancers. It concludes with him dancing in a disco ball jumpsuit on a heli-pad. Two versions of the video were released. The main video is available in most countries, whilst a secondary version was released and geo-restricted to other regions such as Middle East, Southeast Asia, and some parts of European countries. The video also features cameos from fellow UMG recording artist PP Krit, and Thai drag performers Angele Anang, Année Maywong, and Miss Gimhuay.

Discussing the video with Zane Lowe, Sivan explained "There's this sort of reprise when the synth comes back at the end in the video when I'm like being pulled up the building and there's this new drum pattern and to me it was perfect. It was the euphoric moment of that total freedom of realizing that you're completely fine on your own and that also this is not a moment of sadness, but a moment of endless possibilities."

== Reception ==
In reviews for the album Something to Give Each Other, Pitchfork stated that "'Got Me Started' bookends its propulsive two-step beat with a sample snatched from Bag Raiders' 'Shooting Stars', aka from that years-old meme. Although initially grating, its wiggling synths build upon the song's romantic pining in a way that feels funnily reminiscent of Overmono's sample-heavy take on UK garage", while The Guardian said that the song "has a nimble UK garage rhythm."

== In popular culture ==
The song was used in a sketch during the 49th season of Saturday Night Live featuring Bowen Yang as a doctor examining Sarah Sherman, a patient who has started seeing visions of a dancing Sivan (played by host Timothée Chalamet, with Boygenius appearing as clones) as her sleep paralysis demon. Sivan himself reacted to the sketch and changed his profile pictures on social media to that of Chalamet.

The song was also used in the 2023 romantic comedy film Anyone But You.

== Charts ==
=== Weekly charts ===
Weekly chart performance for "Got Me Started"
Chart (2023–2024)	Peak position
Australia (ARIA)	21
Ireland (IRMA)	28
Japan Hot Overseas (Billboard Japan)	14
Latvia (EHR)	20
Netherlands (Single Tip)	18
New Zealand Hot Singles (RMNZ)	3
Poland (Polish Airplay Top 100)	35
Slovakia Airplay (ČNS IFPI)	22
South Korea BGM (Circle)	62
South Korea Download (Circle)	169
Sweden Heatseeker (Sverigetopplistan)	2
UK Singles (Official Charts)	34
US Hot Dance/Electronic Songs (Billboard)	5

=== Year-end charts ===
2024 year-end chart performance for "Got Me Started"
Chart (2024)	Position
Australian Artist (ARIA)	9
US Hot Dance/Electronic Songs (Billboard)	32

== Certifications ==
Certifications for "Got Me Started"
Region	Certification	Certified units/sales
Australia (ARIA)	2× Platinum	140,000^{‡}
Brazil (Pro-Música Brasil)	Platinum	40,000^{‡}
Denmark (IFPI Danmark)	Gold	45,000^{‡}
New Zealand (RMNZ)	Gold	15,000^{‡}
Poland (ZPAV)	Gold	25,000^{‡}
United Kingdom (BPI)	Silver	200,000^{‡}
^{‡} Sales+streaming figures based on certification alone.

== Release history ==
Release dates and formats for "Got Me Started"
Region	Date	Format(s)	Label	Ref.
Various	20 September 2023	Digital download; streaming	EMI; Capitol	
Italy	27 October 2023	Radio airplay	Universal	
