= Honey (Troye Sivan song) =

Single by Troye Sivan

from the album Something to Give Each Other
- Released: 17 May 2024
- Length: 3:26 (album version); 2:54 (single version)
- Label: EMI; Capitol
- Songwriters: Troye Sivan; Kaelyn Behr; Oscar Görres; Brett McLaughlin
- Producers: Oscar Görres; Styalz Fuego

Troye Sivan singles chronology
"One of Your Girls" (2023)	"Honey" (2024)	"Talk Talk" (2024)

Audio video
- "Honey" on YouTube

"Honey" is a song by Australian singer Troye Sivan. It was released on 17 May 2024 as the fourth single from his third studio album Something to Give Each Other (2023).

== Background ==
"Honey" is track nine on Something to Give Each Other. On 3 May 2024, it was confirmed that Sivan had worked with Magnum and music producer Mura Masa on "Honey" remixes, each designed to match the three new varieties of Magnum: Euphoria, Wonder and Chill. Sivan said: "They are a celebration of what brings us pleasure. I've been a big fan of Mura Masa for a long time, and these remixes of my song 'Honey' are about more than just music; they're an invitation to explore our different parts - whether that be euphoria, wonder or chill. I have had a blast working on this project, and I can't wait for you all to experience it yourselves!"

The digital single was released on 17 May 2024.

== Track listing ==
- Digital download and streaming (Remixes EP)
1. "Honey" (Mura Masa chill remix) – 2:47
2. "Honey" (Mura Masa euphoria remix) – 3:53
3. "Honey" (Mura Masa wonder remix) – 3:36
4. "Honey" (single version) – 2:54
5. "Honey" – 3:26

== Charts ==
Chart performance for "Honey"
Chart (2023–2024)	Peak position
South Korea BGM (Circle)	199
US Hot Dance/Electronic Songs (Billboard)	29
