= Cultural impact of Cher =

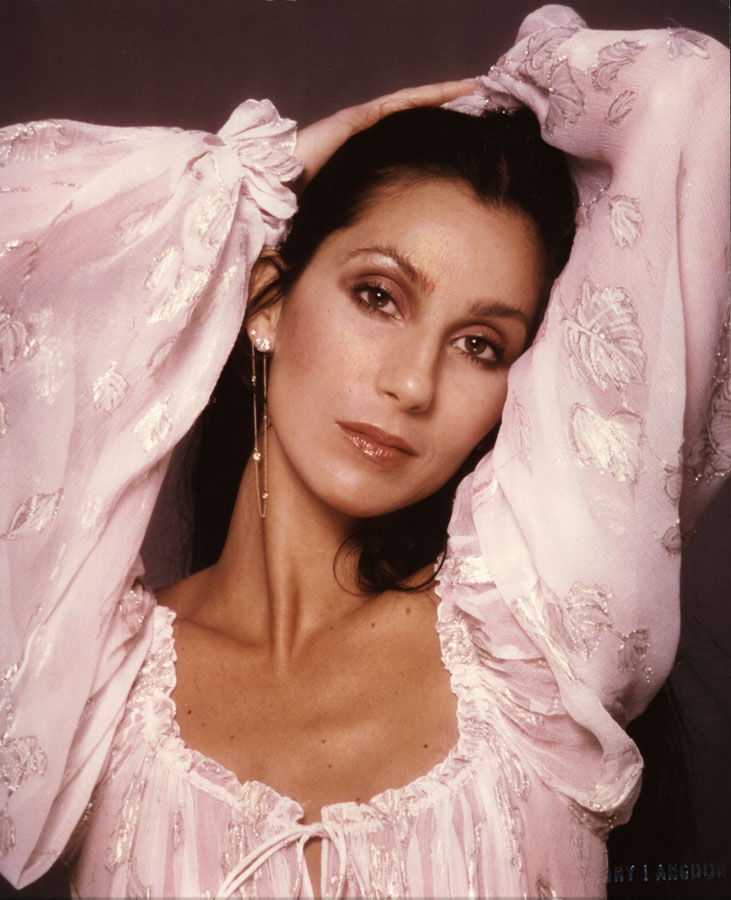
Cher photographed by Harry Langdon Jr., 1978

Cher (born May 20, 1946) is an American entertainer who has influenced popular culture across music, film, television, fashion and activism throughout a career spanning more than six decades. She first reached global audiences as one half of the folk rock duo Sonny & Cher, whose 1965 single "I Got You Babe" became an emblem of the 1960s counterculture. She is the only solo artist to top the US Billboard singles charts in seven consecutive decades and the only performer to hold both an Academy Award for acting and a place in the Rock and Roll Hall of Fame.

Widely referred to as the "Goddess of Pop", Cher has been credited by critics with establishing a template of theatrical, provocative, genre-fluid female pop performance, and her elaborate concert productions have influenced stadium-scale pop touring. Ryan Murphy said "it was Cher who turned transformation into an art form", adding that without her, "there might be no Madonna as we know her, no Prince, either". Cher's early solo songs address subjects then largely absent from American popular music, including divorce, prostitution and racism; Billboard has credited her with developing an androgynous musical identity that predated and informed the work of David Bowie and Patti Smith.

Cher has achieved successive returns to commercial prominence through repeated reinvention. Her music video for the 1980 disco single "Hell on Wheels" has been cited as a precursor to the modern music video, and her music video for the 1989 hair metal single "If I Could Turn Back Time"—filmed aboard the battleship USS Missouri—was the first music video banned by MTV. Her 1998 dance album Believe and its title track introduced the stylized use of Auto-Tune, later known as the "Cher effect" and adopted across pop, hip hop and electronic music. Contemporary artists who have cited Cher as an influence include Beyoncé, Lady Gaga, Jennifer Lopez and Kanye West.

In television, Cher became a fixture of the variety show format: The Sonny & Cher Comedy Hour (1971–1974) drew more than 30 million weekly viewers, with her playing the deadpan comedic lead to Sonny Bono's foil, a role reversal critics have credited with shifting how women were positioned in television comedy; her solo follow-up Cher (1975–1976) hosted David Bowie's American television debut, and Billboard credited Cher with bringing "a rock sensibility to prime-time television". She transitioned to film in the 1980s, winning the Cannes Film Festival Award for Best Actress for Mask (1985) and the Academy Award for Best Actress for Moonstruck (1987); her roles, often portraying independent, self-made women, mirror her public image. Professor Yvonne Tasker has cited her leading-actress career past age 40 as challenging industry norms privileging female youth. Following Cher's Academy Award win in 1988, Ms. magazine named her a defining feminist figure of the decade, and her 1996 retort "Mom, I am a rich man" endures as a feminist statement.

Cher is a fashion icon whose decades-long collaboration with designer Bob Mackie has influenced red-carpet conventions; her 1974 appearance at the Met Gala in a Mackie-designed "naked dress" marked a turning point in the event's red-carpet identity. In 1975, she fought CBS censors and became the first woman to deliberately expose her navel on American network television. Designers including Tom Ford, Marc Jacobs and Anna Sui have cited Cher as an inspiration. She is also a gay icon, recognized for her defiant self-presentation, early incorporation of drag into mainstream performance and long-standing LGBTQ advocacy. Her humanitarian work—channeled through amfAR, Keep a Child Alive and the Cher Charitable Foundation, among others—has addressed LGBTQ rights, veterans' welfare, HIV/AIDS relief, animal rights and advocacy for recognition of the Armenian genocide.

== Performing career ==
=== Music ===
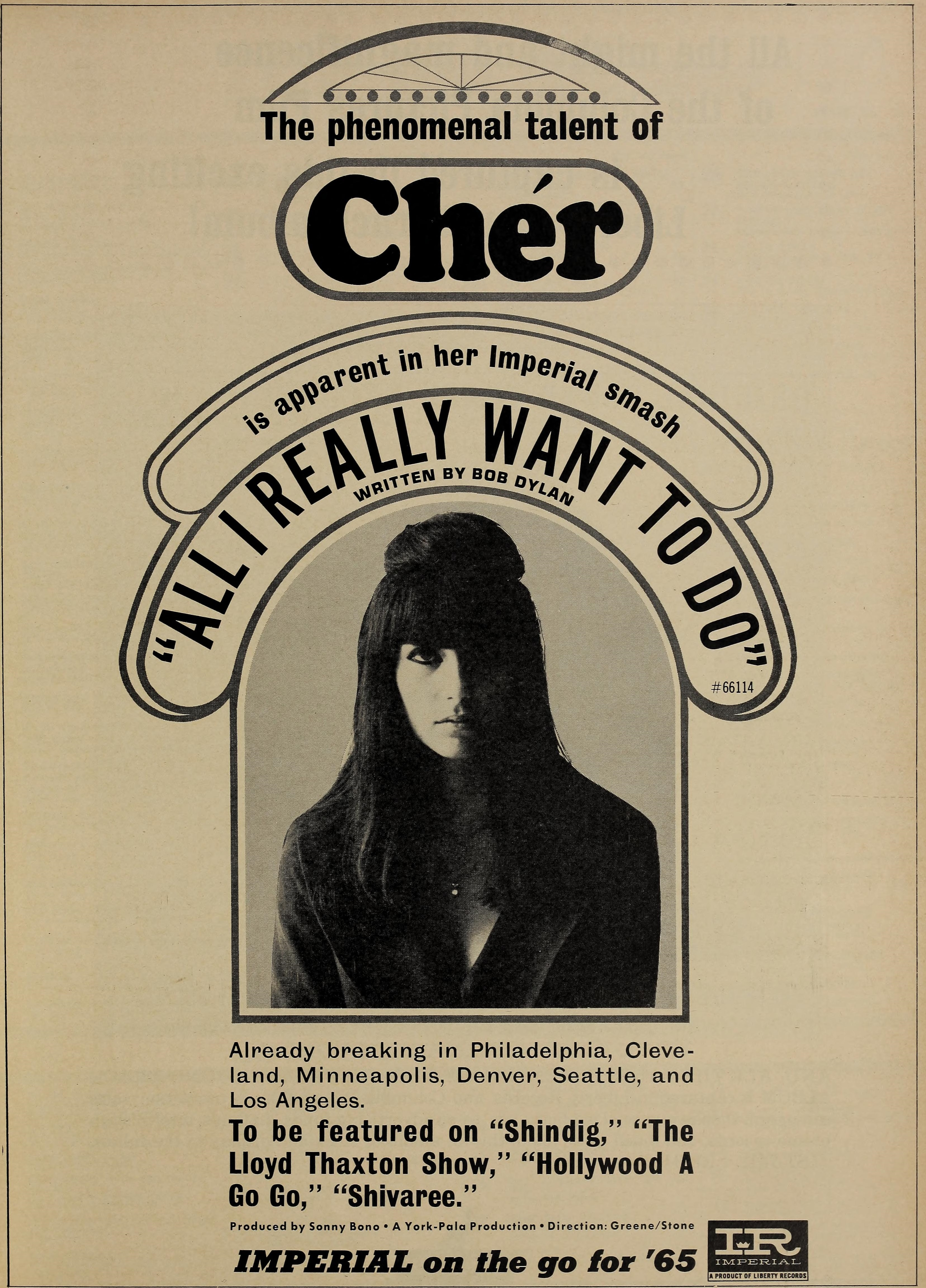
Advertisement for Cher's third solo single, "All I Really Want to Do", featured in Cash Box, June 26, 1965

Music historian Annie Zaleski wrote in Cher's Rock and Roll Hall of Fame induction essay that she sings "nearly every style of music" effortlessly. Across her career, Cher has explored a range of genres including rock—spanning folk, punk, arena and pop subgenres—as well as soul, jazz, disco, new wave, power ballads, hip hop and electronic dance music, an eclecticism she framed as an attempt to "remain relevant and do work that strikes a chord".

Cher's musical career began in the mid-1960s, first through session work and then as one half of Sonny & Cher. As a backup singer under Phil Spector, she appeared on canonical Wall of Sound recordings such as the Ronettes' "Be My Baby" (1963) and the Righteous Brothers' "You've Lost That Lovin' Feelin'" (1964). The Guardian's Alexis Petridis described Cher's early work with Sonny Bono as "the sound of the growing 60s counterculture", while author Joseph Murrells called the duo "leading exponents of the rock-folk-message type of song", blending rock instrumentation, folk themes and protest lyrics.

Goldmine's Phill Marder credited Cher's musical success to her "nearly flawless" song selection, noting that while Sonny contributed to early hits, most of her solo successes came from independent songwriters she chose. Cher's songbook has centered on heartbreak, independence and women's empowerment, positioning her, in the words of Out's Judy Wieder, as a "brokenhearted symbol of a strong but decidedly single woman".

Cher's contralto voice has been praised for its distinctiveness. Ann Powers of The New York Times described her voice as "a quintessential rock voice: impure, quirky [and] a fine vehicle for projecting personality." Her low timbre drew notice from the earliest stage of her career: many radio programmers rejected her 1964 debut single "Ringo, I Love You", mistaking her deep voice for a male vocal and assuming it was a gay man singing to the Beatles drummer Ringo Starr. On her first charting solo single "All I Really Want to Do", Cher's voice dips so low on alternating lines that Atlantic Records president Ahmet Ertegun became convinced Sonny was singing alongside her, which would have constituted a breach of contract.

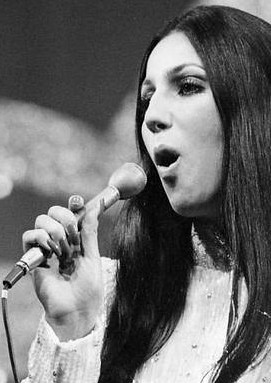
Cher performing in 1973; her 1970s vocal style was described as "dramatic" and "almost as much 'acted' as sung"

Cher's debut album, All I Really Want to Do (1965), was praised by AllMusic's Tim Sendra as "one of the stronger folk-pop records of the era". Upon its release, the Byrds withdrew their competing version of the Bob Dylan-written title song; Roger McGuinn recalled, "We loved the Cher version ... We didn't want to hassle. So we just turned our record over." AllMusic's Mark Deming later judged 3614 Jackson Highway (1969) "the finest album of her career" and "still a revelation four decades after it was released".

Writing about Cher's musical output during the 1960s, Robert Hilburn of the Los Angeles Times stated that "rock was subsequently blessed with the staggering blues exclamations of Janis Joplin in the late '60s and the raw poetic force of Patti Smith in the mid-'70s. Yet no one matched the pure, seductive wallop of Cher". By contrast, her 1970s vocals were described by Eder as "dramatic, highly intense ... [and] almost as much 'acted' as sung".

Some of Cher's early solo songs address subjects rarely explored in American popular music, such as divorce, prostitution, unplanned and underaged pregnancy, and racism. Ryan Murphy of the Miami Herald described the thematic arc of those recordings as "awash with longing and themes of insecurity", arguing that "Half-Breed" and "Gypsys, Tramps & Thieves", "as campy as they are, speak of a woman in search not of an identity—she has always had that—but acceptance".

According to AllMusic's Joe Viglione, Cher's 1972 single "The Way of Love" reads "either about a woman expressing her love for another woman or a woman saying au revoir to a gay male she loved", and her ability to carry both male and female ranges allowed her to sing solo in androgynous and gender-neutral songs. Hilburn added, "There were a lot of great records by female singers in the early days of rock ... None, however, reflected the authority and command that we associate with rock 'n' roll today as much as [Cher's] key early hits".

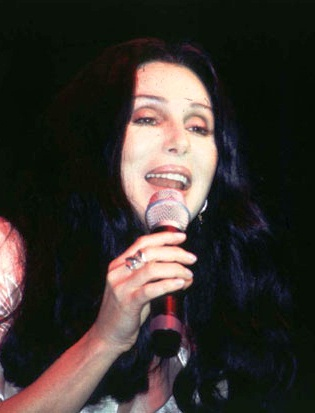
Cher performing in 1996; her contralto voice has been praised for its versatility across genres

Cher's 1975 album Stars, recorded during her push to establish herself as a rock artist, drew praise from Richard Seeley of the Daily Breeze as "an important link between the rock and roll subculture and the mass popular music audience", with Seeley noting that Cher showed "real talent" by choosing lesser-known rock songwriters over "surefire hit makers like John [Lennon] and [Paul] McCartney". First heard on the 1980 record Black Rose, her sharper, more aggressive vocals on hard rock-oriented albums established her sexually confident image. The album, recorded with a short-lived band she formed with guitarist Les Dudek, received poor reviews; she told Rolling Stone that critics "didn't attack the record, they attacked me. It was like, 'How dare Cher sing rock & roll?'" AllMusic's Donald A. Guarisco praised her 1981 duet with Meat Loaf, "Dead Ringer for Love", as "one of the more inspired rock duets of the 1980s".

Murphy read Cher's late-1980s recordings as evidence of a shift in sensibility, writing that "We All Sleep Alone" "reverberates with the struggle to deal with success and its isolating effects" and that "I Found Someone" "is not about a stiletto-grinding female out to burn an ex as much as it is about sheer resilience. This music, like the new, improved Cher, is about maturity of spirit." Reviewing her 1991 album Love Hurts in Entertainment Weekly, Jim Farber praised Cher's "sexually autonomous persona" as "one of the surest of any pop female", noting how she turned heartbreak lyrics into expressions of revenge rather than victimhood. For 1995's It's a Man's World, by contrast, she restrained her vocals, singing in higher registers and without vibrato; Stephen Holden of The New York Times wrote that "From an artistic standpoint, this soulful collection of grown-up pop songs ... is the high point of her recording career."

"Believe" (1998)
"Believe" pioneered the use of Auto-Tune to intentionally distort vocals—a technique later known as the "Cher effect".

"Believe" without Auto-Tune
For comparison, Auto-Tune is not applied in this section.

Cher's 1998 song "Believe" was the first commercial recording to use Auto-Tune—an audio processor for correcting off-key vocals—as a stylistic effect, creating a robotic, futuristic sound. According to Rolling Stone's Christopher R. Weingarten, the producers "used the pitch correction software not as a way to fix mistakes in Cher's iconic voice, but as an aesthetic tool". Cher, who proposed the effect, faced resistance from her label but insisted it remain, saying, "You can change [the song] over my dead body". The technique came to be known as the "Cher effect", a name adopted by the manual for Auto-Tune's fifth release. Pitchfork's Simon Reynolds described it as having "revolutionized the sound of popular music" and as "the sound of the 21st century". Cher used Auto-Tune extensively on Living Proof (2001) and later albums.

AllMusic's Jose F. Promis described Cher's 2000 album Not Commercial, largely self-written during a songwriting camp in 1994, as carrying a "1970s singer-songwriter feel" that highlights her storytelling skills. She chose the title after her label's chief dismissed the project as "nice, but not commercial" and rejected it for its explicit language and bleak content, including personal trauma, homelessness, veteran neglect and the suicide of Kurt Cobain. She sold it independently on her website, an unusual move for an artist under contract with a major label. One of its songs, "Sisters of Mercy", described the nuns who prevented her mother from retrieving her from a Catholic orphanage as "daughters of hell", drawing condemnation from the Catholic Church. (Note: In addition to the eight songs she co-wrote on Not Commercial (2000), Cher is credited as a co-writer on: "My Song (Too Far Gone)", from Take Me Home (1979); "Bad Love", from the soundtrack of Foxes (1980); "Don't Trust That Woman", from Elton John's Leather Jackets (1986); "One by One" and "The Gunman", from the US version of It's a Man's World (1996); "Più che puoi", from Eros Ramazzotti's Stilelibero (2000); "The Music's No Good Without You" and "Real Love", from Living Proof (2001); "Take It Like a Man", "Dressed to Kill" and "Lovers Forever", from Closer to the Truth (2013); In a 2023 interview, Cher said she regretted not requesting a writing credit on "Believe" (from Believe, 1998), for which she contributed the line "I've had time to think it through / and maybe I'm too good for you".)

=== Stage and television ===
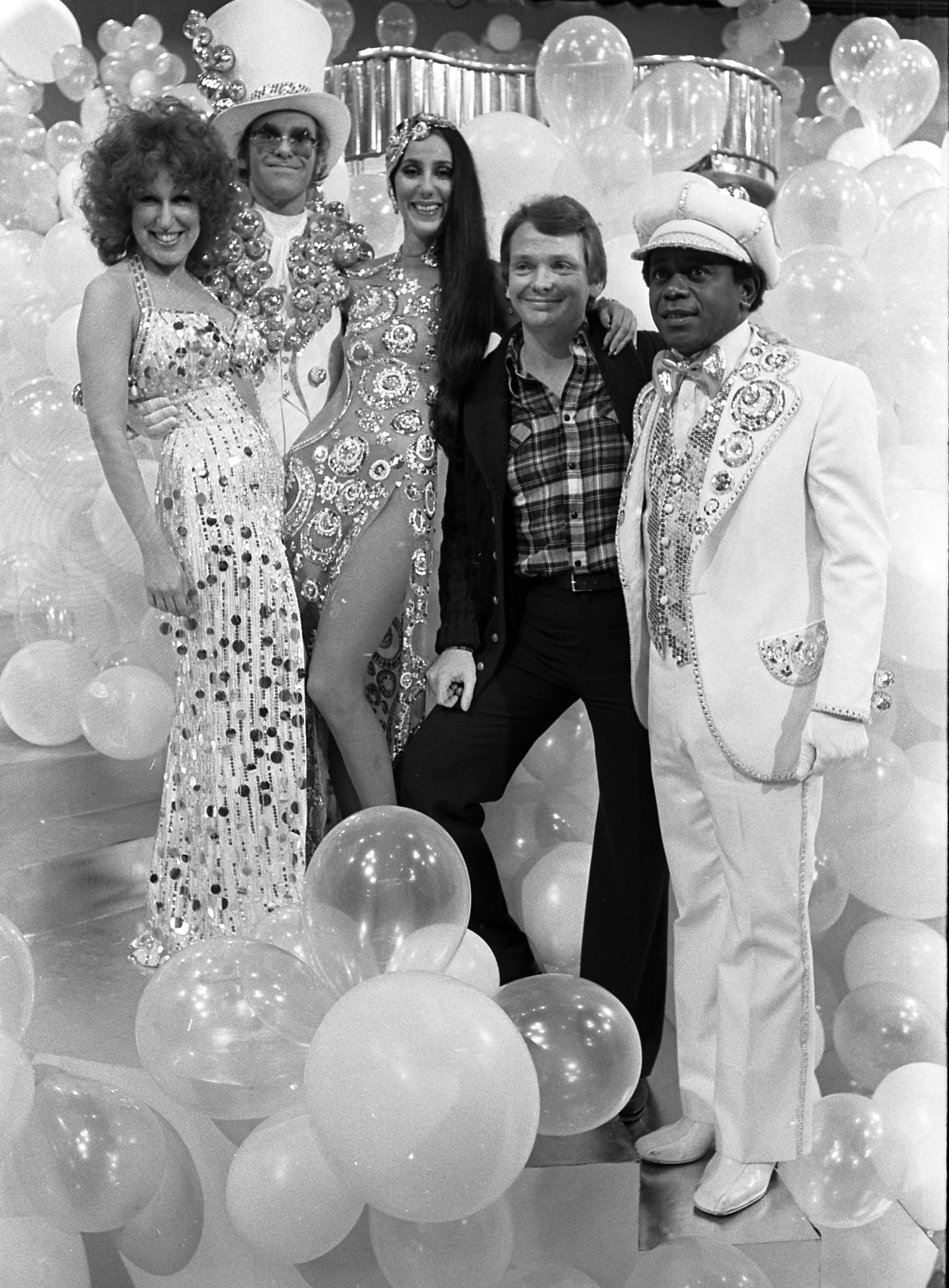
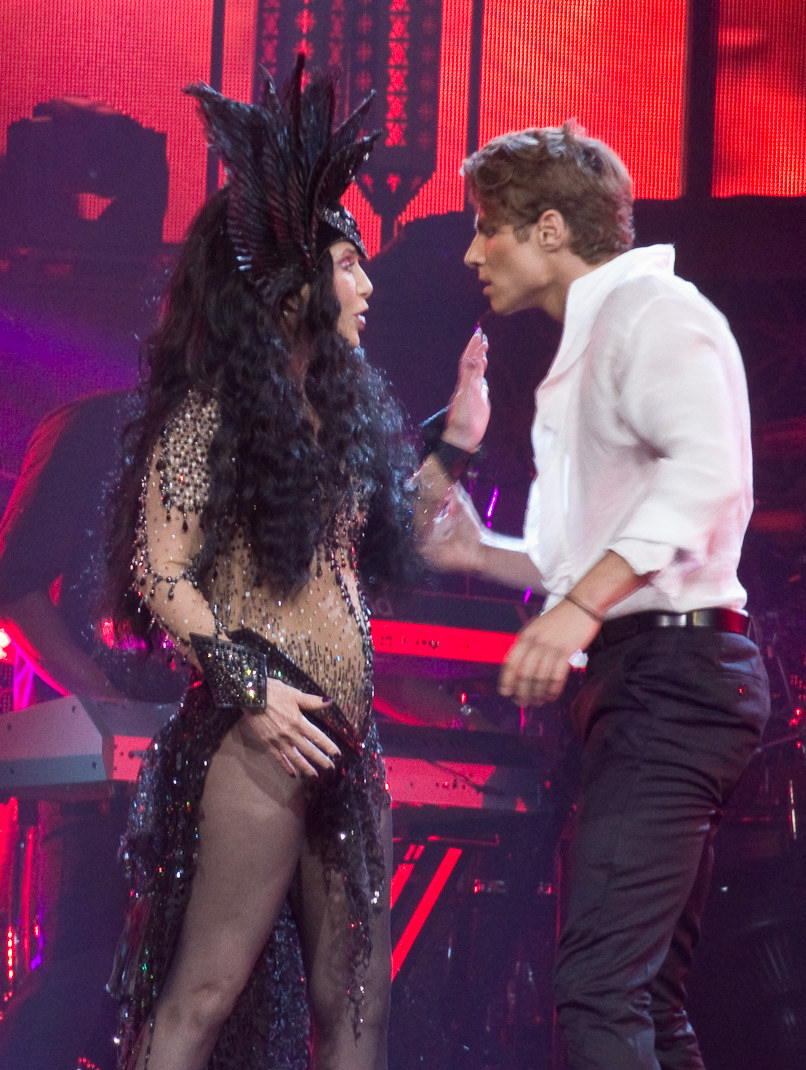
Cher with Elton John, Bob Mackie, Bette Midler and Flip Wilson on the first episode of her variety show Cher (1975, left) and on the Dressed to Kill Tour (2014, right)

Cher's live performances, prime-time television work and music videos have addressed themes such as self-construction, female sexuality and the pursuit of perfection. Commenting on the scale of her shows, Tony Spilde of The Bismarck Tribune wrote that Cher's "lavish concerts have become bigger than the music they're meant to promote", while James Sullivan of the San Francisco Chronicle credited her with influencing the development of stadium-scale concerts, stating, "She's comfortable enough to see such imitation as flattery, not theft." Murphy called her concerts "a testimony to brilliant survival", observing that most of her audience—"men and women"—attend "to pay homage. And, perhaps, to absorb a little bit of her magic."

Cher's concerts often include biographical montages and self-referential visuals. University College Dublin professor Diane Negra described them as multimedia retrospectives that merge different phases of her career into a cohesive stage narrative and frame performance as a form of autobiography. The New York Times' Jon Pareles observed that Cher's onstage appearances alongside projected images of her younger selves function to reaffirm and reclaim earlier identities, crediting her ability to "triumph over restraint, aging and gravity" and calling her "a hit machine immune to sagging flesh". Ann Powers of the Los Angeles Times described her shows as rooted in "her larger-than-life story [and] mythology of self-reinvention".

In her 1991 Cher... at the Mirage concert video, she subverts the typical staging of female pop performances at the time by replacing female backup dancers with a male dancer impersonating her. Dressed in a replica of her 1986 Academy Awards outfit, the impersonator initially appears to be Cher; Cher then emerges in a different costume and begins performing, while the impersonator interacts with oversized props symbolizing fame and media attention. Negra interpreted this segment as Cher casting herself as the narrator of her own life story, using the impersonator to emphasize her status as a "fictionalized production" shaped by media and performance—a dynamic she described as offering audiences a "pleasurable plurality".

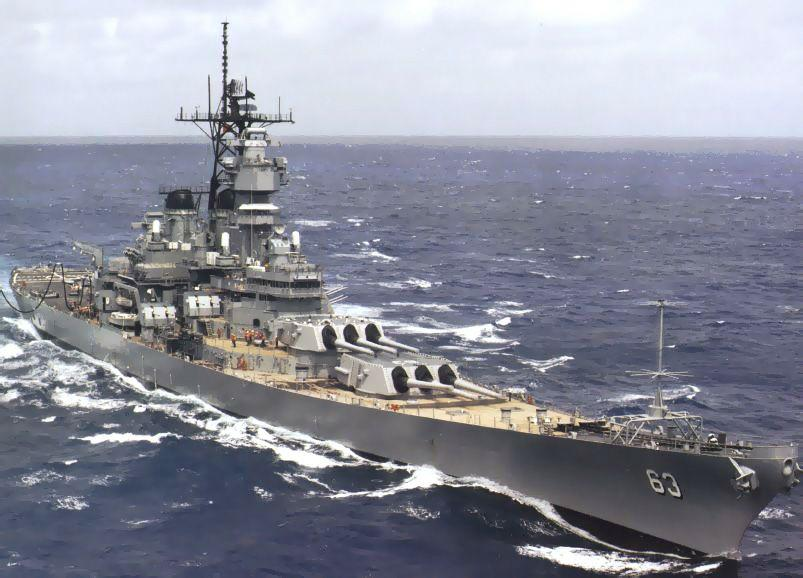
The USS Missouri (BB-63), where Cher filmed the "If I Could Turn Back Time" music video

The Sonny & Cher Comedy Hour (1971–1974) was praised for its comedic timing, as a deadpan Cher mocked Sonny about his looks and short stature. According to biographer Connie Berman, they "exuded an aura of warmth, playfulness and caring that only enhanced their appeal. Viewers were further enchanted when a young [Chaz] appeared on the show. They seemed like a perfect family." Cher honed her acting skills through comedy sketches, including her original character Laverne LaShinsky, a brash and over-the-top housewife. Her solo CBS variety show Cher (1975–1976) hosted David Bowie's American TV debut alongside musical guests such as Ray Charles, Elton John, Bette Midler, Tina Turner and the Jackson 5; Billboard credited the show with bringing "a rock sensibility to prime-time TV".

Cher's 1980 video for "Hell on Wheels" employed cinematic techniques, and film historian Lawrence J. Quirk described it as one of the earliest examples of a modern music video. Her 1989 music video for "If I Could Turn Back Time" became the first to be banned by MTV, amid controversy over her performance aboard the battleship USS Missouri, where she straddled a cannon in a leather thong that revealed her tattooed buttocks, accompanied by homoerotic imagery featuring sailors. Billboard's Rob Tannenbaum later characterized the era as Cher's "MILF of hair metal" incarnation. VH1 ranked Cher 17th on its 2003 list of the "50 Greatest Women of the Video Era".

=== Film ===
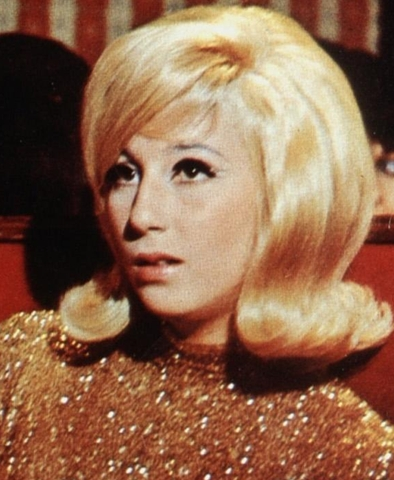
Cher in her first leading film role, Good Times (1967)

Critics have read Cher's screen presence and her film roles as extensions of her public image. Maclean's magazine's Barbara Wickens described Cher as "probably the most fascinating movie star of her generation", highlighting her "magnetic" screen presence and her ability to be both "boldly shocking" and "ultimately enigmatic". New York Post critic David Edelstein attributed Cher's "top-ranking star quality" to her capacity for projecting "honesty, rawness and emotionality", adding that she "wears her vulnerability on her sleeve". Film Comment wrote, "For Cher is a star. That is, she manages the movie star trick of being at once a character and at the same time never allowing you to forget: that's Cher."

Cue magazine wrote of Chastity (1969) that "Cher has a marvelous quality that often makes you forget the lines you are hearing". Frank Rich of The New York Times, reviewing the 1982 Broadway production of Come Back to the 5 & Dime, Jimmy Dean, Jimmy Dean—which Robert Altman adapted into a film with the same cast later that year—called her "cheery, ingratiating nonperformance" a refreshing contrast to a dull ensemble, suggesting the play needed more of her and less of her co-stars. Stephanie Brush, in a 1988 New York Times feature on Cher, felt that Mike Nichols was "scooching her face out of the frame" while directing her in Silkwood (1983), so that she would not pull focus from Meryl Streep.

Professor Yvonne Tasker noted that Cher's film roles mirror her public image as a rebellious, sexually autonomous and self-made woman. She often portrays women who help marginalized male characters navigate mainstream society—including Eric Stoltz's character with craniodiaphyseal dysplasia in Mask (1985), Liam Neeson's mute homeless veteran in Suspect (1987), and Nicolas Cage's socially isolated baker with a wooden hand in Moonstruck (1987).

Film critic Kathleen Rowe wrote of Moonstruck (1987) that the depiction of Cher's character as "a 'woman on top' [is] enhanced by the unruly star persona Cher brings to the part". For The New York Times' Janet Maslin, the film "offers further proof that Cher has evolved into the kind of larger-than-life movie star who's worth watching whatever she does". In a mixed New York Times review of Faithful (1996), Maslin wrote that Cher "does her game best to find comic potential in a victim's role." Reviewing Tea with Mussolini (1999), Lisa Schwarzbaum of Entertainment Weekly described Cher's performance as "always likable, always soft-focus, always strange".

== Public image ==
=== Provocation and controversy ===
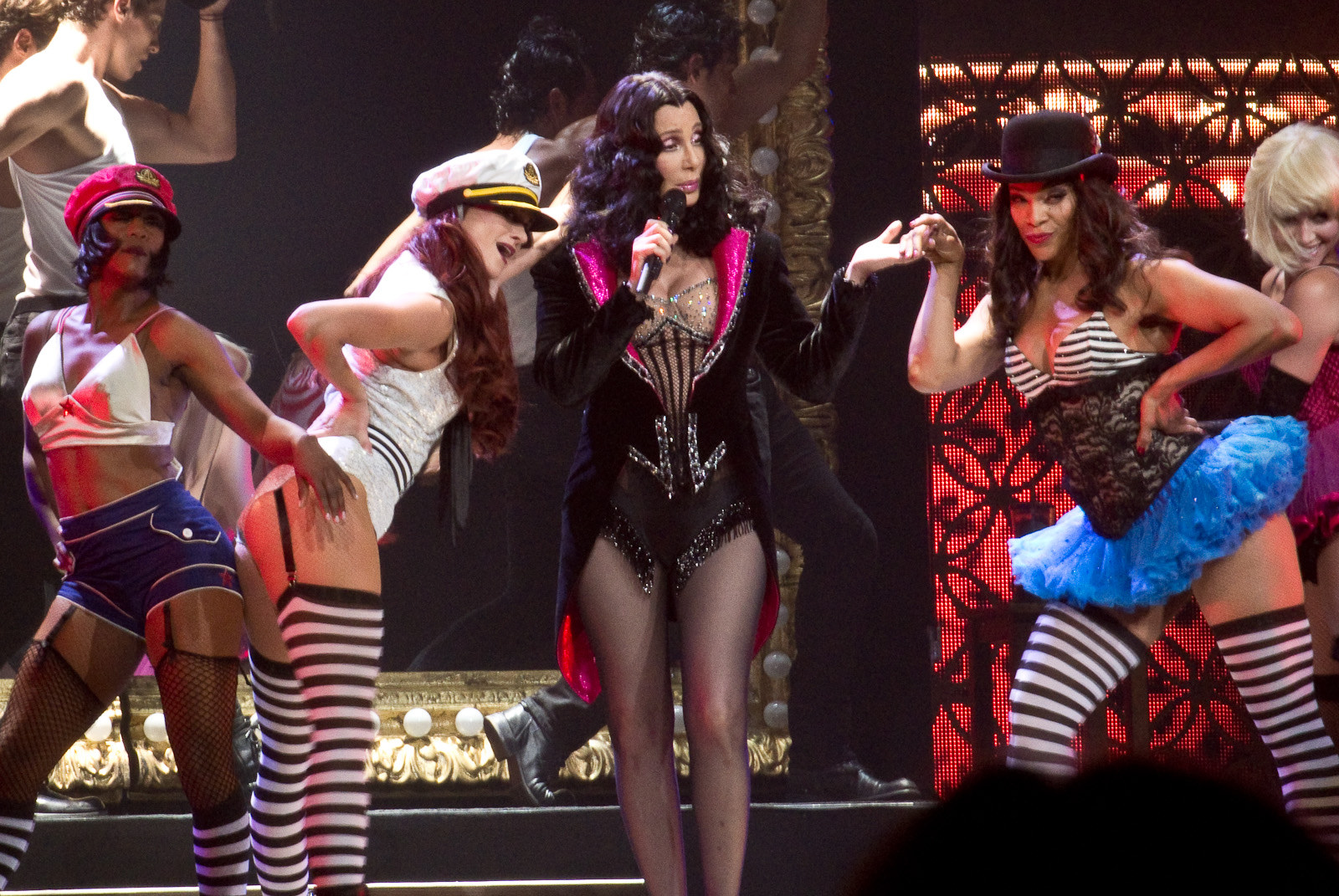
Cher on the Dressed to Kill Tour, 2014; Ryan Murphy wrote that "it was Cher who made 'shocking' chic and palatable"

Cher's public image—marked by defiance, flamboyance and an unwavering sense of self—has itself become a subject of cultural study and popular fascination. The Atlantic's Sophie Gilbert described Cher as "a walking, singing eye roll [who] has never met an obstacle without theatrically raising a middle finger." Writing for the Miami Herald in 1990, Ryan Murphy called Cher a "multigenerational touchstone" and a "barometer of our times"—a polarizing figure about whom indifference is impossible. While validating accusations of "commercial exploitation" and "premeditated controversy", he argued that "it was Cher who made 'shocking' chic and palatable [and] turned transformation into an art form".

For Stephanie Brush, writing in The New York Times in 1988, Cher was "a public Rorschach test"—how people felt about her revealed as much about themselves as about her. Playwright Paul Rudnick, in a 1996 Esquire piece, read Cher as "our nation at its most exuberant and least pretentious", praising her "common-touch suburban citizenship" and her refusal to obey "tastefully rigid career navigation". Rolling Stone's Jancee Dunn called her "the coolest woman who ever stood in shoes" that same year, attributing the status to her refusal to conform:

Her motto is, 'I don't give a shit what you think, I'm going to wear this multicolored wig.' There are folks all over America who would, in their heart of hearts, love to date people half their age, get multiple tattoos and wear feathered headdresses. Cher does it for us.

Ann Powers of the Los Angeles Times called Cher a "mainstream translator" of 1960s counterculture, casting her as a bridge between teenage rebellion and marketability. Writer Cintra Wilson recounted that during Sonny & Cher's late-1960s lounge act, which eventually led to their television variety show, "their lounge act was so depressing, people started heckling them. Then Cher started heckling back." Cher later attributed her sharper retorts to a temperament Sonny had suppressed since the start of their partnership, noting that he had "hated" what he called her "smart mouth" and that she had "kept it dormant" for him.

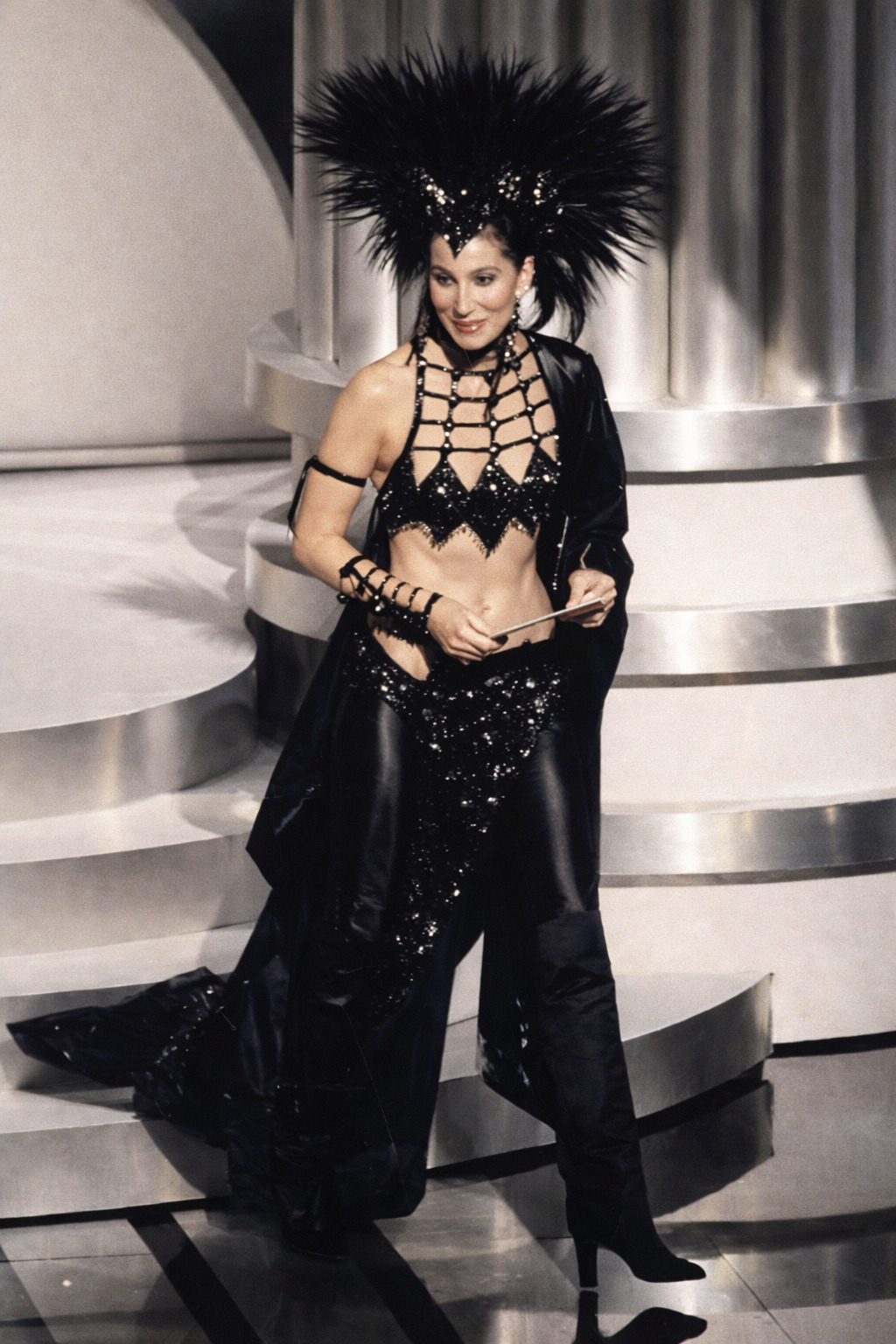
Cher at the 58th Academy Awards in 1986, wearing the "Oscar revenge dress" by Bob Mackie

Cher's 1979 album Prisoner, whose cover shows her naked and draped in chains, was intended to symbolize her struggle as a "prisoner of the press" amid intense tabloid scrutiny; feminist groups criticized the imagery for its perceived depiction of a sex slave. Billboard's Brooke Mazurek wrote that Cher "revolutionized the idea of what a pop star could visually accomplish, the way they could create multiple personas that live on and off-stage"; as the red carpet emerged as a "cultural fixture" in the 1980s, "Cher became one of its leaders". Years earlier, at the 1974 Met Gala, a man had asked Cher "in a very rude, dismissive way" how it felt to be naked; she replied, "It feels great."

At the 58th Academy Awards in 1986, after being left off the Oscar nomination list for her lead role in Mask, Cher wore a dramatic, tarantula-like Mackie outfit that Vanity Fair's Esther Zuckerman later dubbed Cher's "Oscar revenge dress". Presenting the Best Supporting Actor nominees, Cher quipped, "As you can see, I did receive my Academy booklet on how to dress like a serious actress". The incident garnered her much publicity. Mackie recalled that critics were equally dismissive when Cher dressed conservatively, finding it "boring".

In May 1986, Cher appeared on Late Night with David Letterman and called David Letterman "an asshole", generating extensive media coverage; Letterman later said, "It did hurt my feelings. Cher was one of the few people I've really wanted to have on the show." Reflecting on Cher's November 1987 return to the show—where she reunited with Sonny for a final on-air performance of "I Got You Babe"—Rolling Stone's Andy Greene wrote, "They weren't exactly the best of friends at this point, but both of them knew it would make for unforgettable television. Had YouTube existed back then, this would have gone insanely viral the next morning."

During the early 1990s, Cher appeared in infomercials for health, beauty and diet products. Critics saw it as a sellout and speculated her film career was over, with Entertainment Weekly stating she had eroded her "hard-won A-list actress status". Cher herself conceded, "I had really fucked up". She later reflected, "Suddenly I became the Infomercial Queen ... people stripped me of all my other things." Rudnick rejected this dismissal, arguing that the same activities critics treated as undignified were what kept Cher's appeal instinctive rather than calculated and made her "gloriously human".

=== Reinvention ===
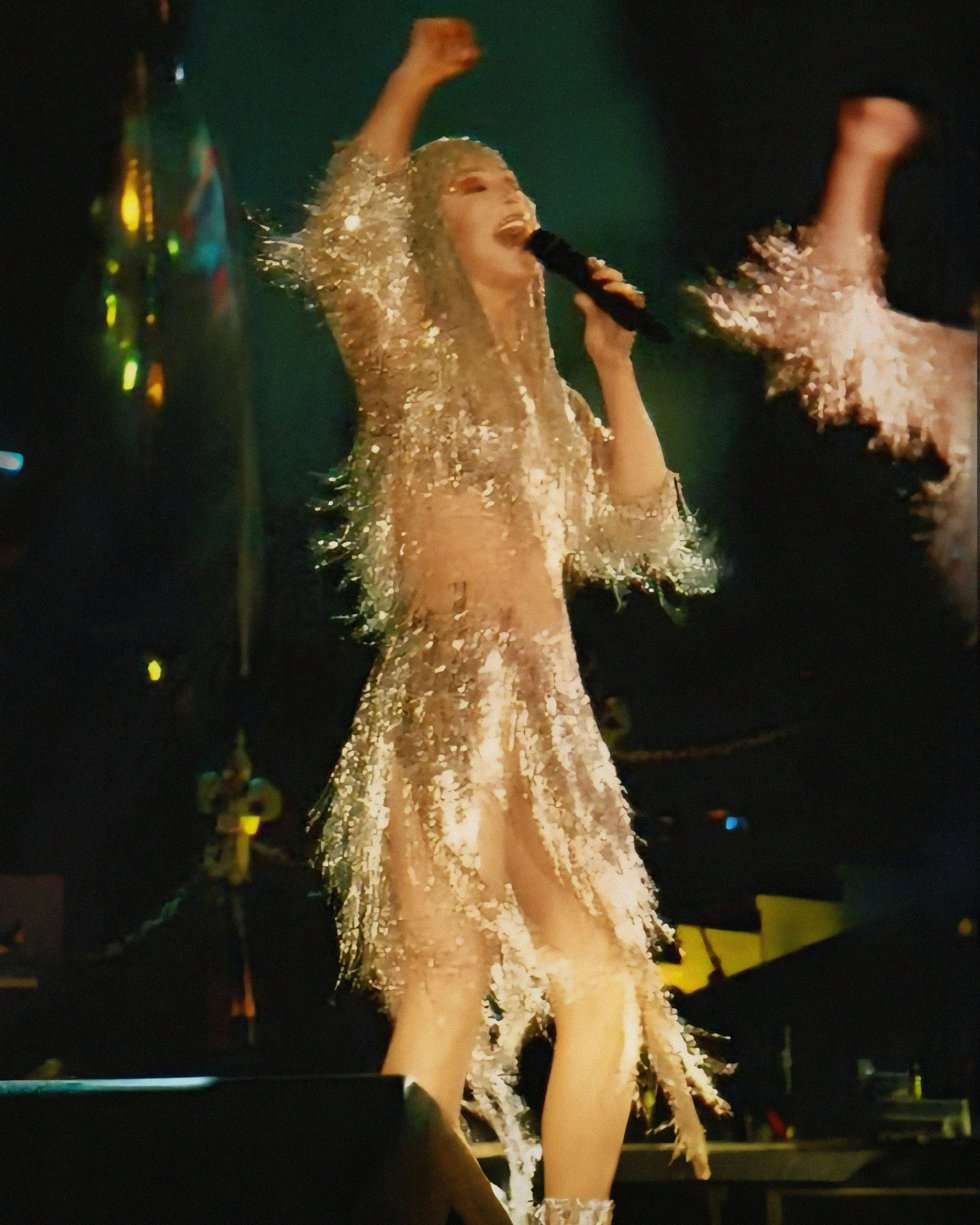
Cher on the Do You Believe? Tour, 1999; Believe was called "the most dramatic comeback Hollywood has seen"

Cher's career has been marked by continual reinvention; professor Richard Aquila described her as "the ultimate pop chameleon", while The New York Times dubbed her the "Queen of the Comeback". Gilbert commented, "Decades before Madonna had reinventions and Taylor Swift had eras, Cher had comebacks—triumphs over decline in which she'd reemerge stronger, shinier, and more resolute than ever." Entertainment Weekly described her album Believe (1998) as "the most dramatic comeback Hollywood has seen", while Pitchfork wrote that "coming from Cher—a confident, charismatic, and massively talented woman who'd been subjected to frequent public ridicule over her personal life", the era gained "an extra survivalist edge".

Author Craig Crawford described Cher as "a model of flexible career management", highlighting how she adapted her image to align with cultural trends while maintaining a rebellious persona that made her transformations both strategic and authentic. Murphy called Cher's "gumption, her refusal to kowtow to expectations and her genius at image make-over" the hallmarks "not only of her talent, but also of her phenomenon". The Boston Globe credited her with driving her own evolution, calling her a forerunner of transformation in pop music who turned reinvention into a deliberate strategy rather than a survival instinct.

Conversely, anthropologist Grant McCracken wrote that while reinvention is a common frame for celebrity careers, Cher's case is distinct: she "is inclined to lock on to each new fashion wave [and] is swept violently down the diffusion stream and out of fashion. Only substantial re-creation permits her to return to stardom". Murphy wrote that Cher "has been kept down, then unleashed and remade through her own determination so many times that it defies logic". Cher remarked, "It's a thousand times harder to come back than to become. Becoming famous is hard, but making a comeback is almost impossible." She also compared her career to a bumper car: "When I hit a wall I just backed up and turned around. ... I couldn't let it matter what people thought."

=== Feminism and gender ===
Cher's career has drawn attention from critics and scholars as a case study in gender roles and feminism in the entertainment industry. Billboard described her as a "pioneer of female autonomy" who "paved a way in a sexist industry" during a "male-driven" era. Goldmine's Phill Marder said Cher advanced "feminine rebellion" in 1960s rock, describing her as "the prototype of the female rock star" who set "the standard for appearance, from her early hippie days to her later outlandish outfits and her attitude—the perfect female punk long before punk even was a rock term". Billboard credited Cher with establishing an "androgynous musical identity" that predated and influenced artists such as David Bowie and Patti Smith.

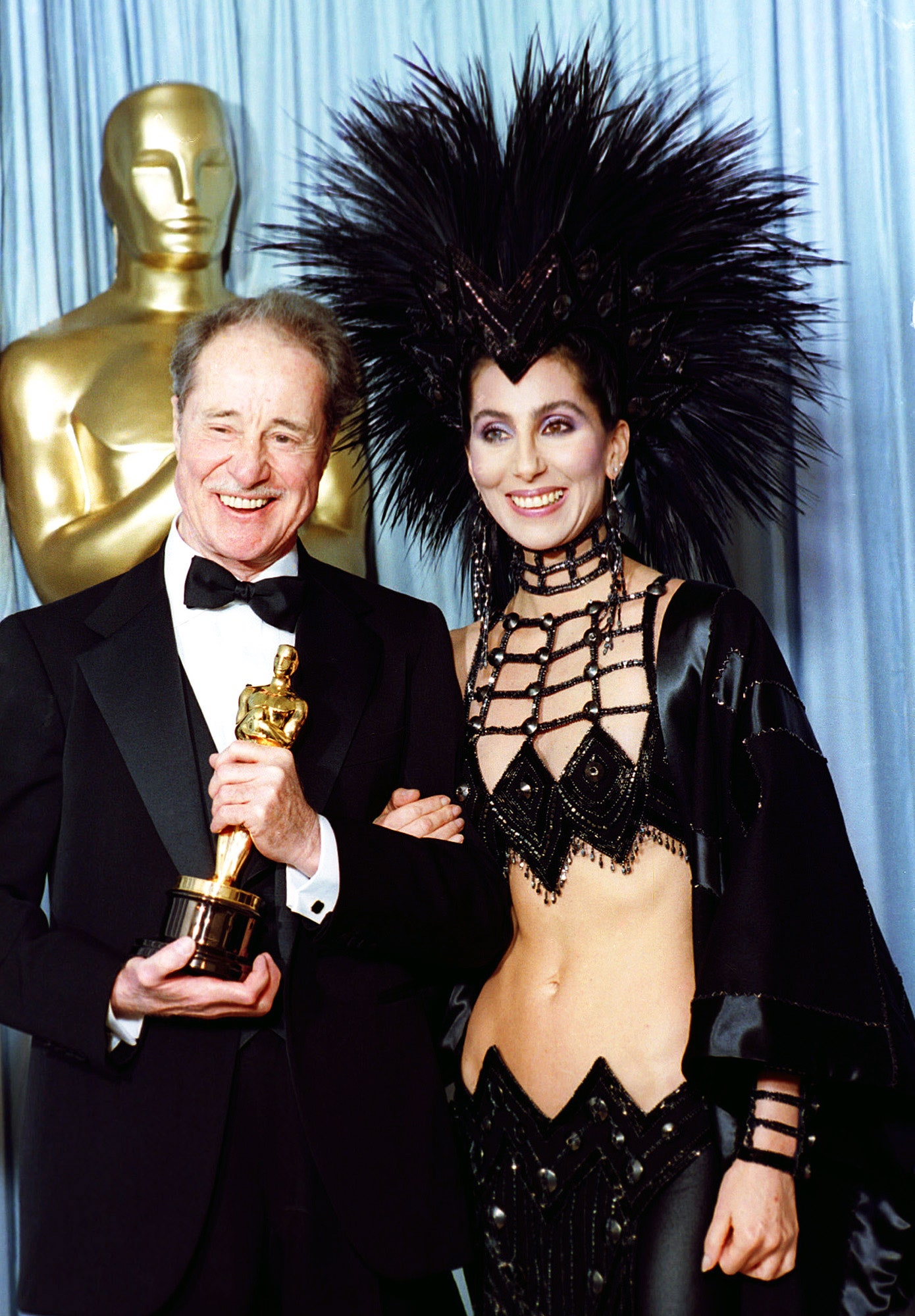
Cher with Don Ameche at the 58th Academy Awards, 1986; Ms. praised her as "the quintessential woman of the '80s"

Marder attributed Cher's rebellious image in part to her commanding, "near dominatrix" stage persona alongside Sonny and her rise to greater prominence as a solo act. AllMusic noted that during her popular 1970s TV shows with Sonny, "he was a diminutive foil to Cher's sexually provocative comedienne", reversing traditional gender dynamics and positioning her as the comedic lead. Writing for Time, Ginia Bellafante described The Sonny & Cher Comedy Hour as having brought "a jokey, mass-market, safe feminism to TV as Sonny played emasculated buffoon to Cher's smart aleck". Director George Schlatter credited Cher with redefining women's roles in television comedy, stating, "Until Cher, women have been the joke, not done the joke ... She's the first female star to carry a show in the same way that men have". After her divorce from Sonny, Cher found network censors "more watchful" of her solo variety show than they had been of The Sonny & Cher Comedy Hour: "When I was married ... I could get away with all kinds of double entendre stuff, and nobody took it seriously. But after my divorce, all that changed".

Early in her career, Cher's critics often framed her output as an extension of male collaborators, a view Cher addressed directly: "It was a time when girl singers were patted on the head for being good and told not to think". Over time, her image evolved, reflecting what professor Yvonne Tasker described as her ambition to build an acting career "on her own terms" by rejecting both "dependence on a man [and] the conventional role assigned to women [over 40] in an industry that fetishises youth". Author Lucy O'Brien saw her as embodying the American Dream of self-reinvention by challenging assumptions around aging in the entertainment industry: "Getting old does not have to mean getting obsolete."

At the 1985 Cannes Film Festival, where Mask competed in the official selection, Cher publicly broke with the film's director Peter Bogdanovich over Universal Pictures' cuts to the film; she told reporters, "From working with Peter, it's no surprise to me that he would serve his own interests before those of the film." In the weeks before Cher's Academy Award win in 1988, The New York Times' Stephanie Brush compared her impact on women to Jack Nicholson's cultural appeal among men, writing that by never having been "America's Sweetheart", Cher was able to embody women's "revenge fantasies" and tell "all the half-witted pencil-pushers exactly where they can go": "You need to be more than beautiful to get away with this. You need to have been Cher for 40 years." Following the win, Ms. magazine praised her as an "authentic feminist hero" and "the quintessential woman of the '80s", citing her flamboyant self-presentation, her public confrontation with Letterman, her marriage to a "known heroin addict", her single motherhood and her candor about cosmetic surgery, and concluded that she had "finally landed in an era that's not afraid to applaud real women".

Columnist Kathleen Parker dissented from the Ms. characterization in the Orlando Sentinel, contending that Cher was being celebrated "for doing all the things most of us try so hard not to do" and that feminism should be about "learning to keep your mouth shut ... and mastering the arts of discretion and modesty". Murphy argued that Cher's feminism was self-evident rather than ideological, writing that "she packs as much of a blow for feminism in one concert as any issue of Ms. magazine ever did". In a 1996 New York Times profile, feminist critic Camille Paglia attributed Cher's resonance with women to her working-class background, writing that "a mass audience of women have a deep empathy with her emotional life".

==== "Mom, I am a rich man" ====
A 1996 Dateline NBC interview clip featuring Cher's response to her mother's advice to "marry a rich man"—"Mom, I am a rich man"—went viral in 2016. Bustle's Erica Kam described the quote as a subversion of traditional gender norms and a feminist statement. Taylor Swift featured it alongside LGBTQ rights imagery in the 2019 music video for "You Need to Calm Down", and Christina Aguilera closed a video montage on the #MeToo movement with the quote during her Xperience Las Vegas residency that same year. Canadian singer Ralph named her record label Rich Man Records after the quote. In 2025, Madonna modeled sheer tights embroidered with the phrase in Instagram photos, and the K-pop group Aespa cited it as the direct inspiration for their single "Rich Man".

=== Fashion ===
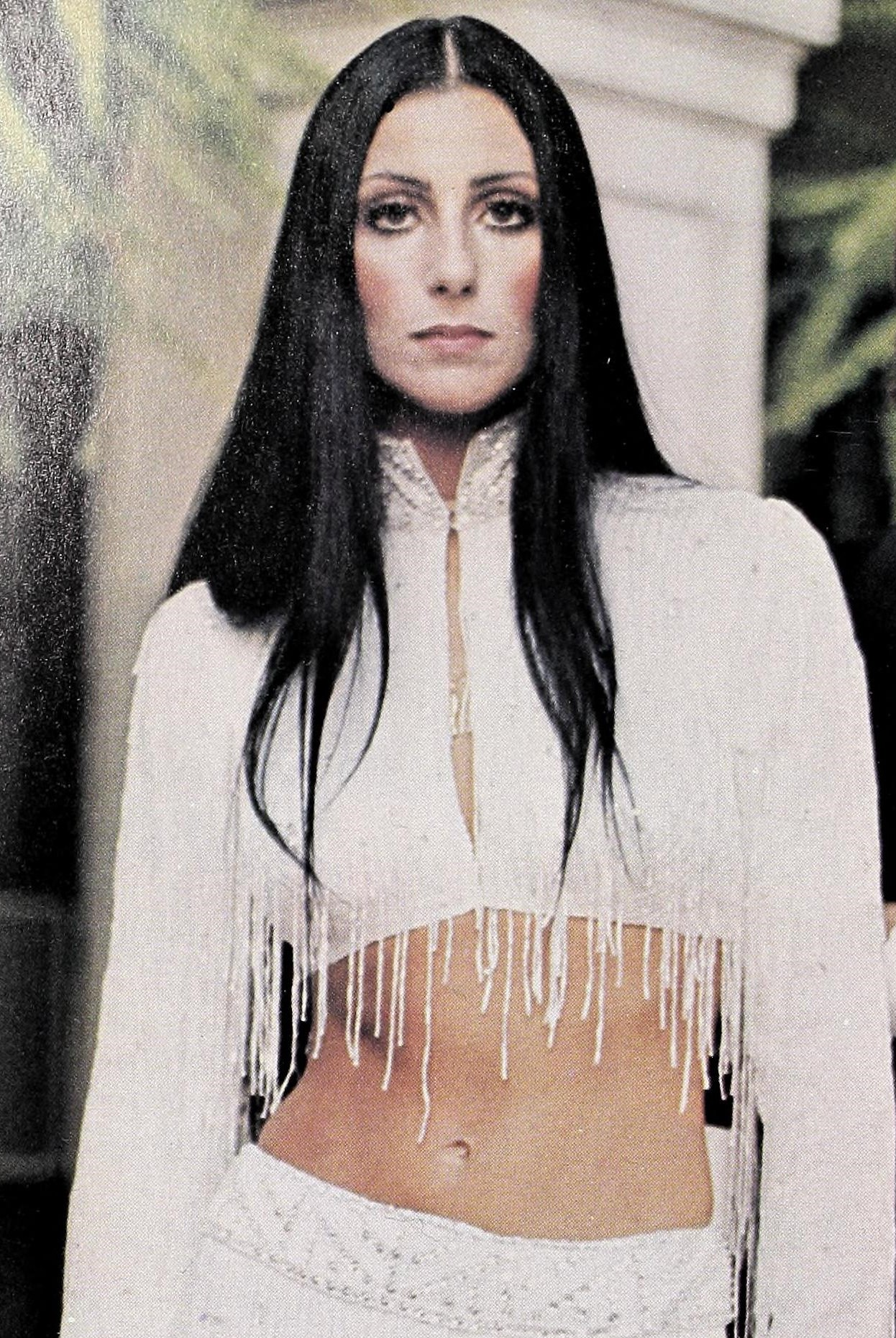
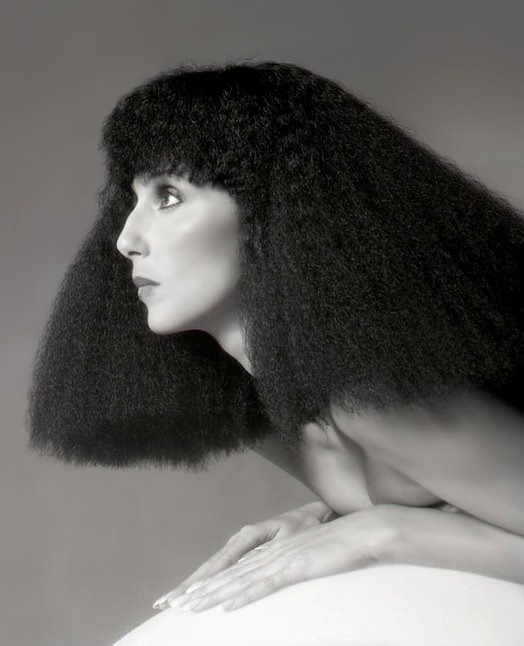
Cher in 1972 (left) and 1978 (right); Time described her as a "cultural phenomenon" who "changed the way we see celebrity fashion"

Time described Cher as a "cultural phenomenon [who] has forever changed the way we see celebrity fashion". She emerged as a fashion trendsetter in the 1960s, popularizing "hippie fashion with bell-bottoms, bandanas and Cherokee-inspired tunics". After "I Got You Babe" displaced the Beatles at the top of the UK charts in 1965, English teenagers began emulating Sonny & Cher's look—bell-bottoms, striped pants and fur vests. On the duo's subsequent US tour, their concerts drew numerous Cher look-alikes, with girls straightening and dyeing their hair black and adopting her signature vests and bell-bottoms. Writer Cintra Wilson recalled that after Sonny & Cher were thrown out of the London Hilton over their outfits in 1965, "London went gaga for the heretofore-unseen S&C look, which was neither mod nor rocker". In 1967, she caught the attention of then-Vogue editor Diana Vreeland at a party for Jacqueline Kennedy and began modeling for photographer Richard Avedon. She appeared five times as the cover model for US Vogue.

By the turn of the 1970s, as the duo pivoted from counterculture flag-bearers to a "new, sophisticated and mature" nightclub act, Cher adopted the "alluring, low-cut gowns that became her signature look". Avedon photographed Cher in a beaded and feathered see-through gown by Bob Mackie for the cover of Time in 1975; Billboard called it "one of the most recreated and monumental looks of all time". Cher had first worn the gown—dubbed the "naked dress"—to the 1974 Met Gala. According to André Leon Talley of Vogue, "it was really the first time a Hollywood celebrity attended and it changed everything. We are still seeing versions of that look on The Met red carpet 40 years later." Billboard wrote that Cher has "transformed fashion and [become] one of the most influential style icons in red carpet history". When she formed the rock band Black Rose in 1980, she took the opposite turn, adopting a punk-inspired look and cutting her signature long hair in an effort to blend in with the group and avoid overshadowing them with her celebrity status.

The Hamilton Spectator declared Cher "the It girl of the '70s". She became a sex symbol through her TV shows, wearing inventive and revealing Mackie-designed outfits and successfully fighting network censors to bare her navel. Because she did so by choice rather than at the direction of male producers, Cher is often credited as the first woman to expose her navel on American television. (Note: The first woman to appear with her navel exposed on American television was Yvette Mimieux, in a 1964 episode of the medical drama Dr. Kildare.) People dubbed Cher the "pioneer of the belly beautiful". In 1972, after she was featured on the International Best Dressed Hall of Fame List, Mackie stated: "There hasn't been a girl like Cher since [Marlene] Dietrich and [Greta] Garbo. She's a high-fashion star who appeals to people of all ages." According to her grandson J. David Riva, Marlene Dietrich—herself a Mackie fan—commented on nearly every Cher outfit and took pride in having helped pave Cher's path as a performer.

In 1999, after the Council of Fashion Designers of America (CFDA) honored Cher with its Influence on Fashion Award, Robin Givhan of the Los Angeles Times called her a "fashion visionary" for "striking just the right note of contemporary wretched excess". Givhan noted that designers such as Tom Ford, Anna Sui and Dolce & Gabbana have cited Cher as "source of inspiration and guidance". She added that "Cher's Native American showgirl sexpot persona now seems to epitomize the fashion industry's rush to celebrate ethnicity, adornment and sex appeal." Vogue proclaimed Cher their "favorite fashion trendsetter", calling her "eternally relevant [and] the ruler of outré reinvention". The Independent's Alexander Fury traced her influence on celebrities including Beyoncé, Halle Berry, Jennifer Lopez and Kim Kardashian, stating, "They all graduated from the Cher school of never sharing the stage with anyone."

=== Physical appearance ===
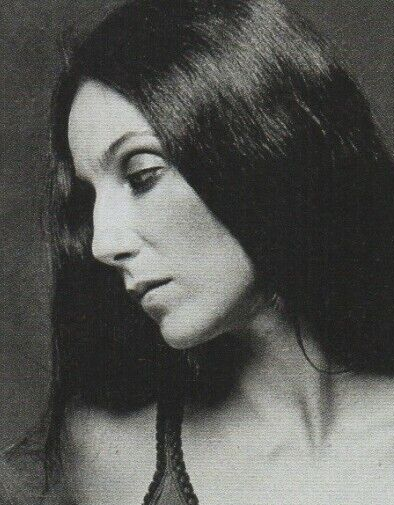
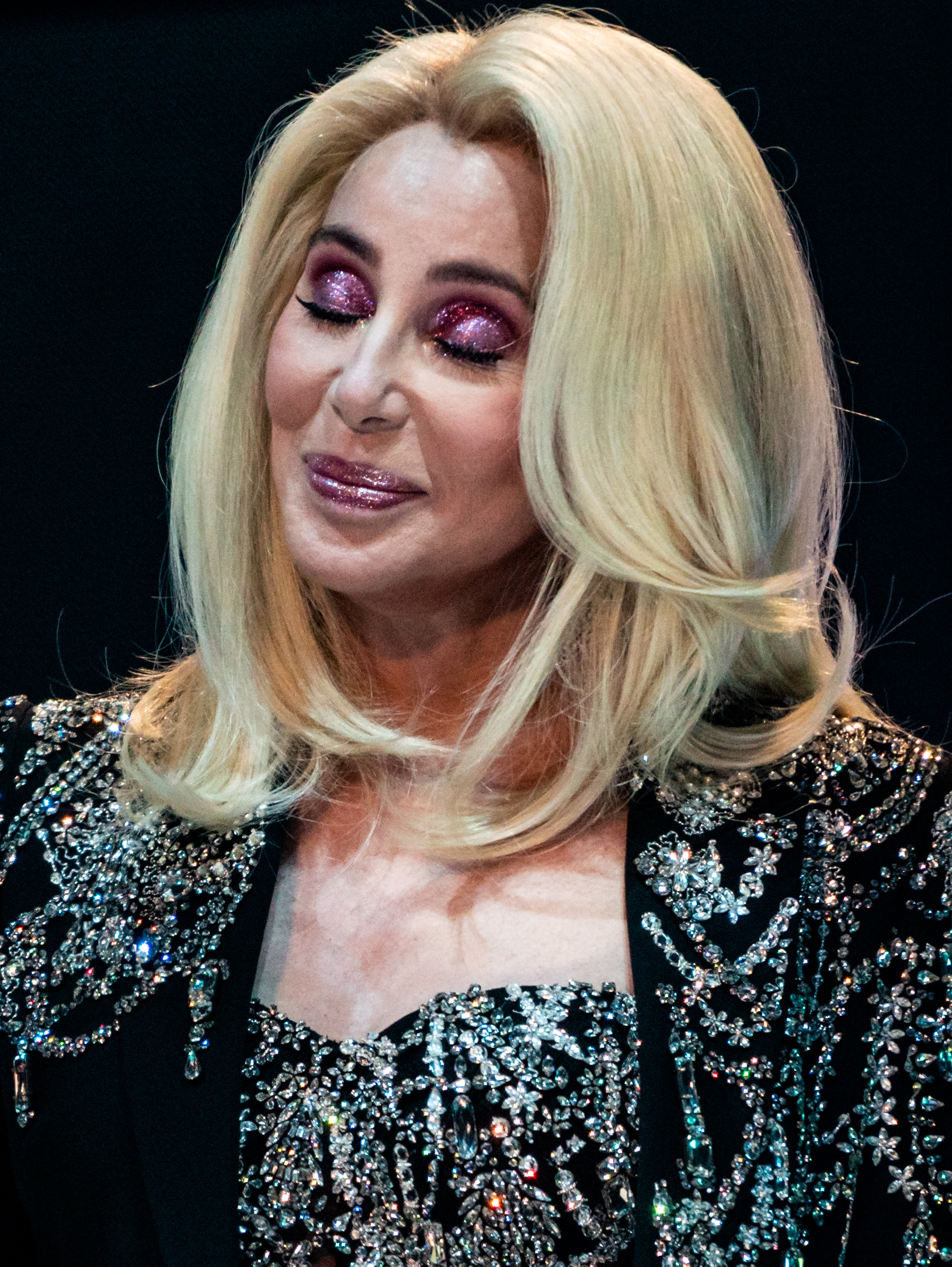
Cher's signature "Cher hair" (left, 1977), a teased look (center, 1985) and a blonde wig (right, 2019)

Cher has attracted media attention for her physical appearance, including her hairstyles, distinctive facial features, perceived agelessness and tattoos. Her signature hairstyle, known as "the Cher hair"—long, straight, jet-black hair parted in the center—was a 1970s fashion trend that saw multiple revivals in later decades. In the 1970s, she started wearing wigs on her TV shows to play various characters in the same episode. By the 1990s, wigs became a staple of her public appearances, enabling her to experiment with colors and lengths. She has stated that wigs help her "stay current" while protecting her natural hair. Professor Katrin Horn from University of Greifswald wrote that Cher's use of wigs has surpassed typical celebrity fashion, elevating her into "the realms of feminine drag".

New York magazine's David Denby described Cher's look as "odd, a bit oriental and snaky" and suggested that it aligned with "the traditional definition of a Hollywood star—that you always want to see more". Paddy Calistro of the Los Angeles Times wrote that during Cher's rise as a movie star in the 1980s, her "highly articulated bone structure captured audience attention", which led to an increased number of medical requests for "surgically inserted 'cheekbones'". In Ageless Intensity: High-Intensity Workouts to Slow the Aging Process (2022), Pete McCall credited Cher and Madonna as being among the first female celebrities to hire personal trainers, a shift he said changed "the image of femininity" and inspired women to exercise in pursuit of "the lean and fit bodies of the stars".

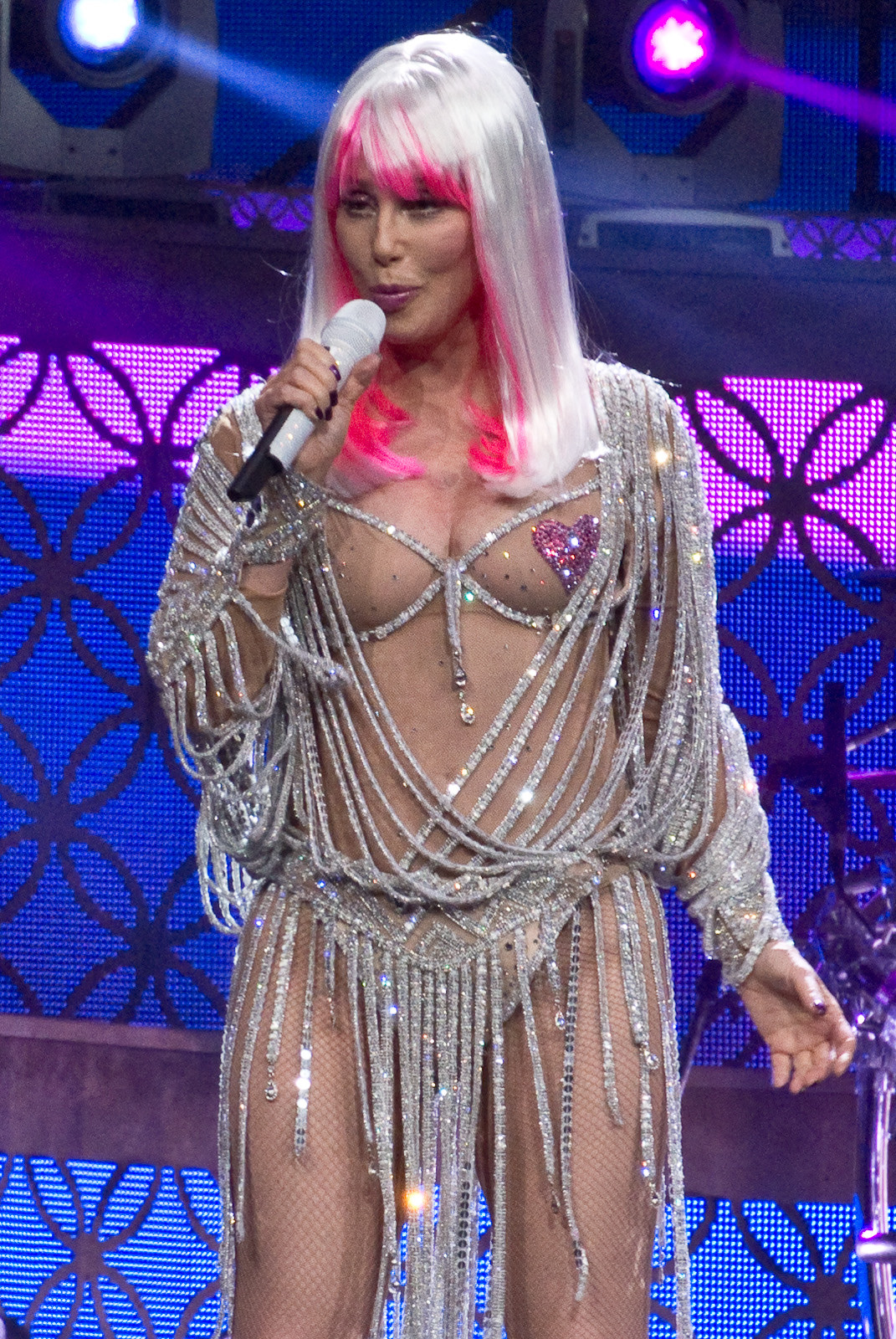
Cher performing in 2014, at age 68

In 1988, Cher was voted the sexiest woman in Us magazine's annual readers' poll. In 1992, Madame Tussauds wax museum honored Cher as one of the five "most beautiful women of history" by creating a life-size statue. In 2002, VH1 ranked her 26th on its "100 Sexiest Artists" list.

Journalists have often called Cher the "poster girl" of plastic surgery. McCracken, in his book Transformations: Identity Construction in Contemporary Culture, connected her surgeries to her career reinventions, describing the procedures as "hyperbolic, extreme, over the top ... a transformational technology that is dramatic and irreversible". Author Caroline Ramazanoglu wrote that Cher's appearance has evolved from "a strong, decidedly 'ethnic' look [to] a more symmetrical, delicate ... and ever-youthful version of female beauty". She argued that Cher's idealized beauty "now acts as a standard against which other women will measure, judge, discipline and 'correct' themselves". Cher has admitted to plastic surgery but criticized media speculation, denying most rumored procedures. She stated she does not need to justify her choices, saying in 2002, "If I want to put my tits on my back, it's nobody's business but my own."

By the early 1990s, Cher had six tattoos, including what she called "a garden on my butt". The Baltimore Sun called her the "Ms. Original Rose Tattoo". She got her first tattoo in 1972. According to Sonny, "Calling her butterfly tattoos nothing was like ignoring a sandstorm in the Mojave. That was exactly the effect Cher wanted to create. She liked to do things for the shock they created." She began having laser treatments to remove her tattoos in the late 1990s. She commented, "When I got tattooed, only bad girls did it: me and Janis Joplin and biker chicks. Now it doesn't mean anything. No one's surprised."

=== Social media ===
Cher
(@cher)
tweeted:

Adults are SO PACMAN🙄🤔🤑

December 26, 2015

Cher's social media presence has been noted for its unconventional and candid style. Time named Cher "Twitter's most outspoken (and beloved) commentator", while The New York Times' J Wortham highlighted her authenticity, contrasting it with the heavily curated online personas typical of celebrity accounts. Wortham described Cher as "an outlier, perhaps the last unreconstructed high-profile Twitter user", whose posts combine "nakedness and honesty" that is "rarely celebrated" in mainstream culture. Similarly, The Guardian's Monica Heisey described Cher's Twitter account as "a jewel in the bizarro crown of the internet", noting, "While many celebrities use Twitter for carefully crafted self-promotion, Cher just lets it all hang out." Journalists have also remarked on her frequent use of emojis, which Cher has linked to her dyslexia, describing them as intuitive tools for visualizing emotions.

In November 2022, after criticism of her relationship with music executive Alexander Edwards, 40 years her junior, Cher replied on Twitter, "Love doesn't know math." In July 2023, after a fan-made music video featuring an AI-generated version of Cher's voice covering Madonna's "La Isla Bonita" circulated online, Cher expressed concerns about the use of AI to replicate her voice and likeness: "I've spent my entire life trying to be myself and now ... they'll do my acting and they'll do my singing?"

=== Activism ===
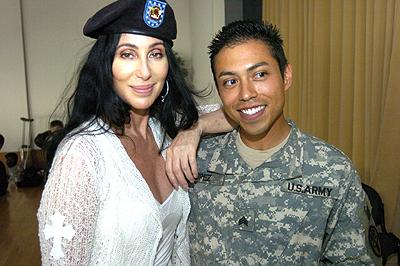
Cher visiting wounded servicemembers at Landstuhl Regional Medical Center in Germany, 2006

Cher's advocacy and philanthropic work, undertaken across five decades, have centered on LGBTQ rights and HIV/AIDS relief, with further involvement in recognition of the Armenian genocide, veterans' welfare, progressive political advocacy, disaster relief, elder rights and animal welfare, channeled primarily through the Cher Charitable Foundation and partnerships with organizations such as the American Foundation for AIDS Research (amfAR).

Cher's support for her son Chaz Bono, who came out as a lesbian at age 17 and later transitioned as a transgender man, shaped the trajectory of her LGBTQ advocacy. After initially grappling with "guilt, fear and pain", she concluded that LGBTQ people "didn't have the same rights as everyone else, [and she] thought that was unfair". In 1997, Cher delivered the keynote at the national Parents, Families, & Friends of Lesbians and Gays (PFLAG) convention, and in 1998 received the GLAAD Vanguard Award for having "made a significant difference in promoting equal rights for lesbians and gay men". In September 2013, Cher declined an invitation to perform at the 2014 Winter Olympics opening ceremony in Russia, citing the country's anti-LGBTQ legislation.

Cher is a donor, fundraiser and international spokesperson for Keep a Child Alive, which seeks to combat AIDS, including providing antiretroviral medicine to children and their families. In 1996, she hosted the amfAR Benefit alongside Elizabeth Taylor at the Cannes Film Festival. In 2015, she received the amfAR Award of Inspiration for "her willingness and ability to use her fame for the greater good" and for being "one of the great champions in the fight against AIDS".

In 1993, Cher joined a humanitarian mission to Armenia, delivering food and medical supplies to the war-torn region. She has since advocated for recognition of the Armenian genocide; at the 2016 premiere of The Promise, a war film depicting the genocide, she criticized Turkey's denial and cited Hitler's Obersalzberg Speech—"Who, after all, speaks today of the annihilation of the Armenians?"—while recalling her grandparents' survival of the genocide.

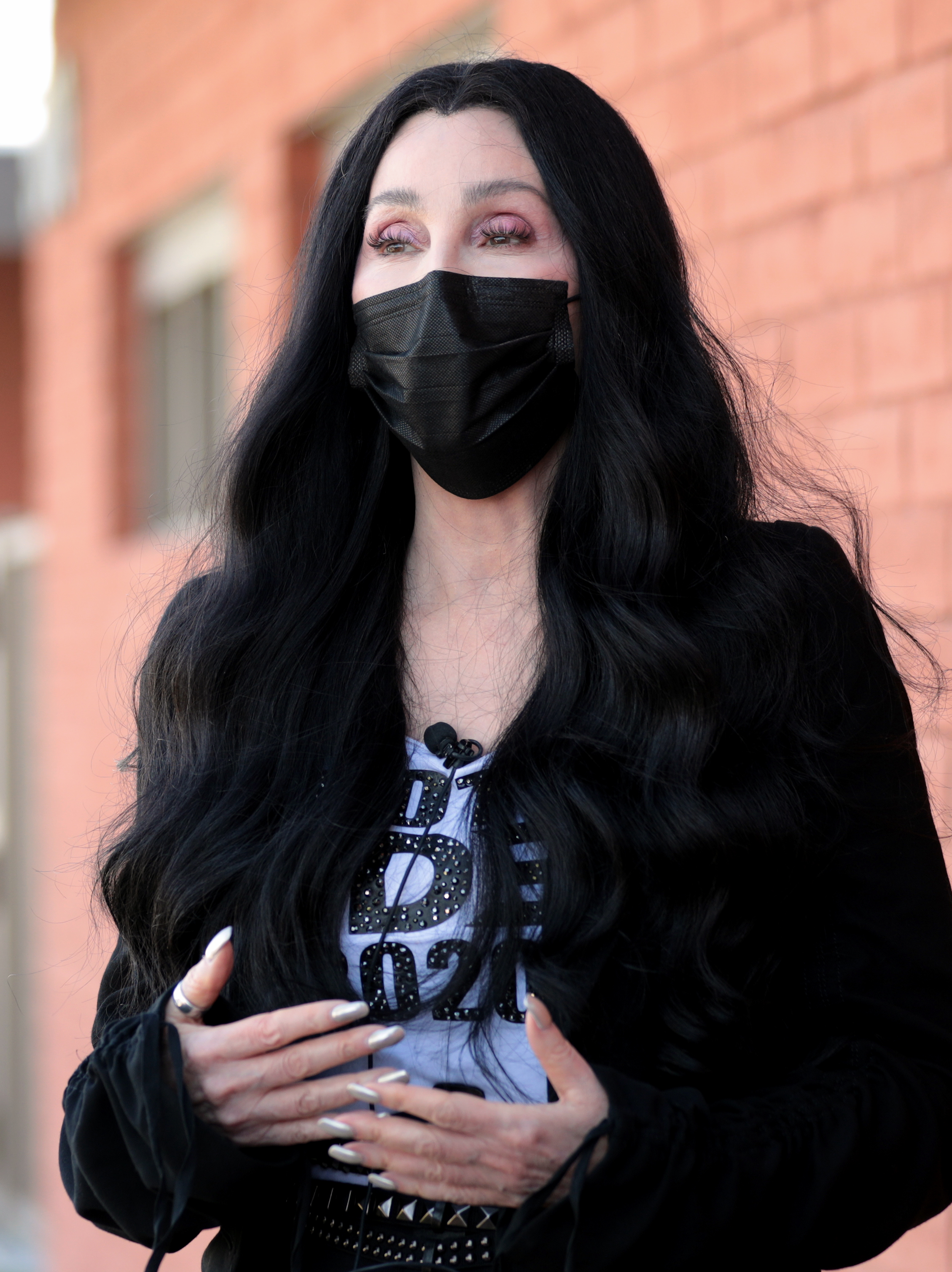
Cher at an early voting site in 2020; she has been an outspoken critic of the conservative movement

Cher has been a vocal advocate for American soldiers and returning veterans. In October 2003, she anonymously called a C-SPAN phone-in program to recount a visit to wounded soldiers at the Walter Reed Army Medical Center and criticized the lack of media coverage and government attention given to injured servicemen. In a 2006 Stars and Stripes interview, she described her position as "against the war in Iraq but for the troops". She has supported Operation Helmet, which provides free helmet upgrade kits to troops in Iraq and Afghanistan, and contributed to the Intrepid Fallen Heroes Fund, which aids military personnel severely injured in war-related operations.

Cher's progressive political views have drawn media attention, and she has been an outspoken critic of the conservative movement. She has said she did not understand why anyone would be a Republican because eight years under the administration of George W. Bush "almost killed [her]". During the 2000 United States presidential election, ABC News wrote that she was determined to do "whatever possible to keep [Bush] out of office"; she said, "If you're black ... a woman [or] any minority in this country at all, what could possibly possess you to vote Republican? ... You won't have one fucking right left."

During the 2012 United States presidential election, Cher and comedian Kathy Griffin released a public service announcement, "Don't Let Mitt Turn Back Time on Women's Rights", criticizing Republican nominee Mitt Romney for supporting Richard Mourdock, who had called pregnancies resulting from rape "part of God's plan".

Cher serves as the Honorary National Chair of Habitat for Humanity's "Raise the Roof" initiative for affordable housing, and since 2007 has been the primary supporter of the Peace Village School in Ukunda, Kenya. In 2016, after the discovery of lead contamination in the drinking water of Flint, Michigan, Cher donated more than 180,000 bottles of water to the city. In 2017, she executive-produced Edith+Eddie, a documentary about a nonagenarian interracial couple, which was nominated for the Academy Award for Best Documentary Short. In 2020, she traveled to Pakistan to help secure the transfer of Kaavan, an elephant confined to a zoo for 35 years, to a wildlife sanctuary in Cambodia; the effort was chronicled in the 2021 documentary Cher & the Loneliest Elephant, released on Paramount+.

=== Political ===
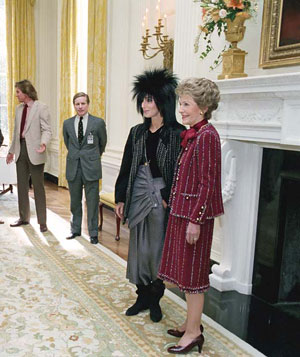
Cher in 1985 at a White House reception hosted by First Lady Nancy Reagan

Cher has said that she is not a registered Democrat, but has attended many Democratic events. Her progressive political views have attracted media attention and she has been an outspoken critic of the conservative movement. She has commented that she did not understand why anyone would be a Republican because eight years under the administration of George W. Bush "almost killed [her]". During the 2000 United States presidential election, ABC News wrote that she was determined to do "whatever possible to keep [Bush] out of office". She said, "If you're black ... a woman [or] any minority in this country at all, what could possibly possess you to vote Republican? ... You won't have one fucking right left." She added, "I don't like Bush. I don't trust him ... He's stupid. He's lazy."

On October 27, 2003, Cher anonymously called a C-SPAN phone-in program to recount a visit she made to maimed soldiers at the Walter Reed Army Medical Center and criticized the lack of media coverage and government attention given to injured servicemen. Although she identified herself as an unnamed entertainer, she was recognized by the C-SPAN host, who questioned her about her 1992 support for independent presidential candidate Ross Perot. She said:

When I heard him talk right in the beginning, I thought that he would bring some sort of common-sense business approach and also less partisanship, but then ... I was completely disappointed like everyone else when he just kind of cut and run and no one knew exactly why ... Maybe he couldn't have withstood all the investigation that goes on now.

In a 2006 Stars and Stripes interview, Cher elaborated on her "against the war in Iraq but for the troops" position: "I don't have to be for this war to support the troops because these men and women do what ... they're told to do ... They do the best they can. They don't ask for anything."

Cher supported Hillary Clinton in her 2008 presidential campaign. After Obama won the Democratic nomination, she supported his candidacy. In a 2010 interview with Vanity Fair, she commented that she "still thinks Hillary would have done a better job", although she "accepts the fact that Barack Obama inherited insurmountable problems". During the 2012 United States presidential election, Cher and comedian Kathy Griffin released a public service announcement titled "Don't Let Mitt Turn Back Time on Women's Rights", criticizing Republican presidential nominee Mitt Romney for his support of Richard Mourdock, the US Senate candidate who suggested that pregnancies resulting from rape were "part of God's plan".

In September 2013, Cher declined an invitation to perform at the 2014 Winter Olympics opening ceremony in Russia due to the country's controversial anti-LGBTQ legislation that overshadowed preparations for the event. In June 2015, after Donald Trump announced his candidacy for president, she made critical comments on Twitter, stating that "Donald Trump's punishment is being Donald Trump". She endorsed Clinton in her 2016 presidential campaign. In 2018, after the victory in Brazil's presidential election of right-wing populist Jair Bolsonaro, Cher called him a "pig" and "a politician from hell", declaring that Bolsonaro should be "locked in prison for the rest of his life".

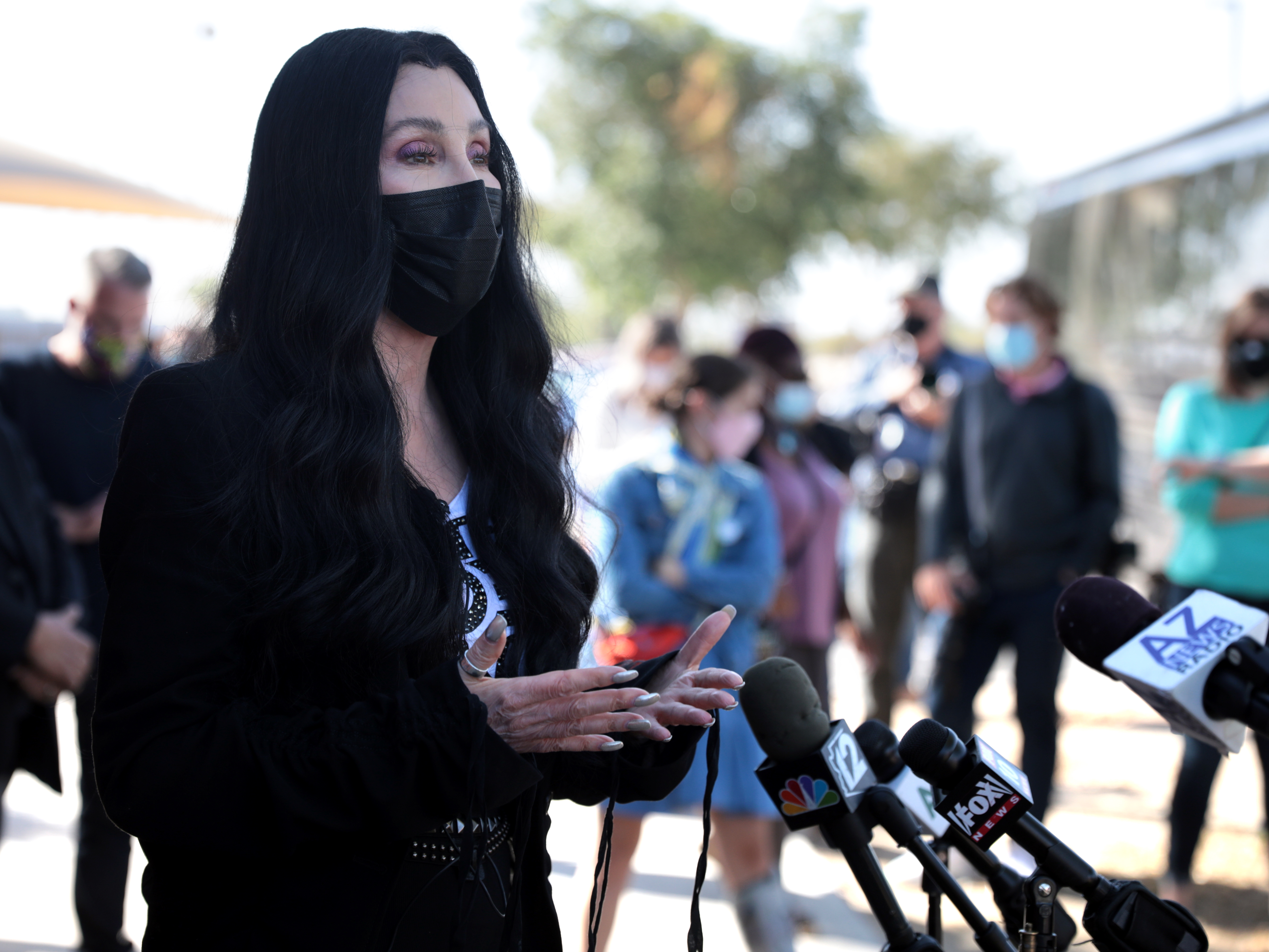
Cher in 2020 speaking to the media at an early voting center in the Fowler Elementary School District

Cher has advocated for recognition of the Armenian genocide. At the 2016 premiere of The Promise, a war film depicting the genocide, she criticized Turkey's denial and highlighted the general public's lack of awareness. She cited the Obersalzberg Speech and the line, "Who, after all, speaks today of the annihilation of the Armenians?" She also discussed her Armenian heritage and her grandparents' survival of the genocide. Cher expressed support for Armenia and Artsakh on Twitter during the 2020 Nagorno-Karabakh war. The following year, she congratulated Joe Biden for being the first US President to formally recognize the Armenian genocide.

In September 2020, Cher raised nearly $2 million for Biden's presidential campaign at a virtual LGBTQ-themed fundraiser. In October, she campaigned for Biden in Nevada and Arizona and released a cover of "Happiness Is a Thing Called Joe", originally from the 1943 musical Cabin in the Sky, with lyrics updated to be about Biden. In 2022, following Russia's invasion of Ukraine, Cher voiced support for Ukraine on Twitter and called for humanitarian aid. She referred to Russian President Vladimir Putin as a despot seeking to restore the Soviet Union and announced plans to provide shelter to Ukrainian refugees in her home.

In October 2024, Cher endorsed the presidential ticket of Kamala Harris and Tim Walz, stating on social media that Harris was "fighting for all of us" and would "protect our rights".

=== As a gay icon ===
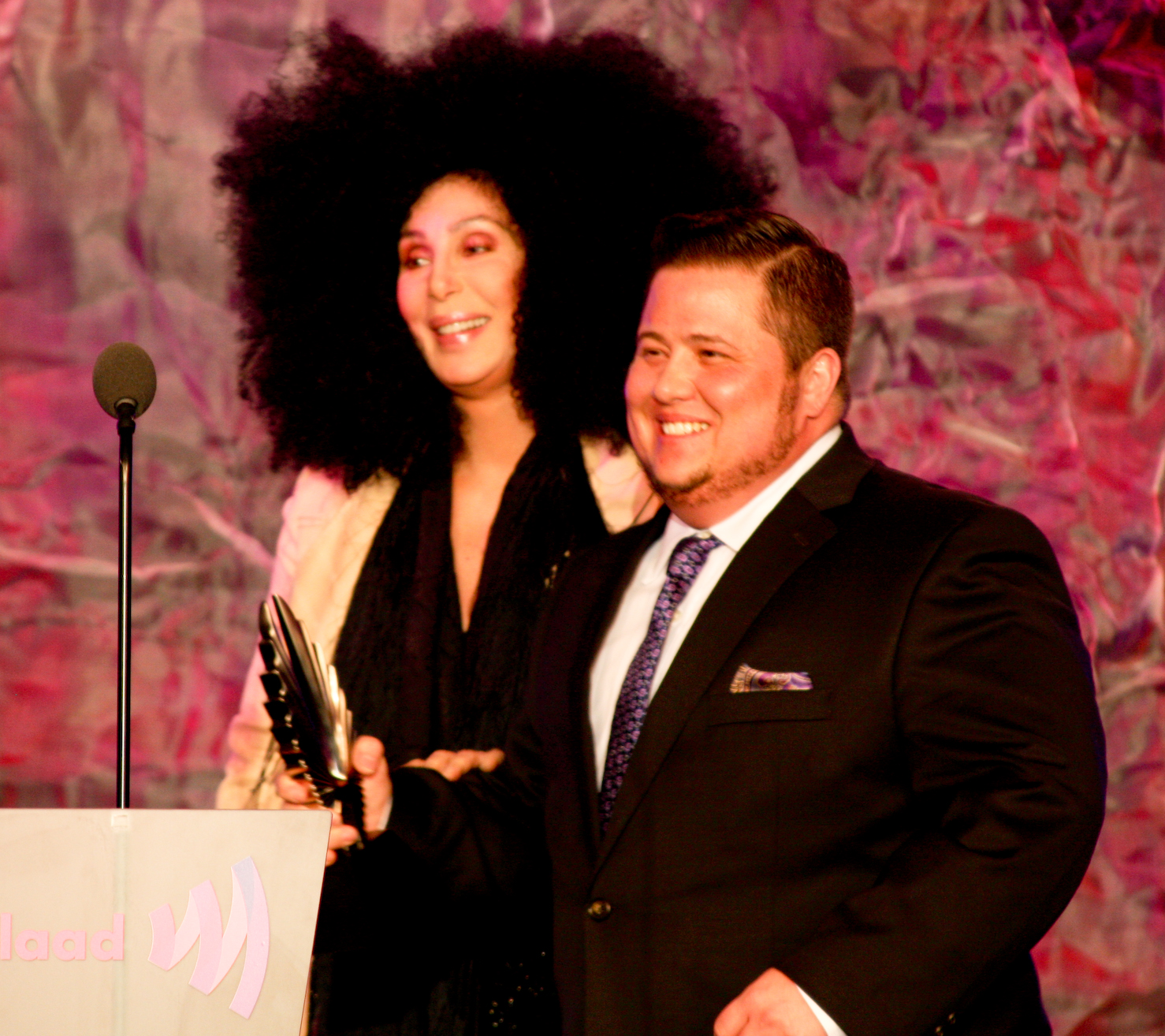
Cher presenting son Chaz Bono with the GLAAD Stephen F. Kolzak Award, 2012

Cher is revered by the LGBTQ community, a status attributed to her unguarded defiance, outsider status, flamboyant image and longevity; Alec Mapa of The Advocate described her appeal as embodying "an unapologetic freedom and fearlessness that some of us can only aspire to". Cher has said, "Actors don't consider me an actor. Singers don't consider me a singer. And gay men consider me their best friend." She has also remarked, "I think the longer I look good, the better gay men feel." She is regarded as a gay icon and is frequently imitated by drag queens. According to Salon writer Thomas Rogers, drag queens emulate figures like Judy Garland, Dolly Parton and Cher because they "overcame insult and hardship on their path to success"—narratives that resonate with the struggles many gay men face when coming out.

Many of Cher's songs are considered gay anthems, including "If I Could Turn Back Time", "Believe", "Strong Enough" and "Song for the Lonely". Maclean's journalist Elio Iannacci stated that Cher was "one of the first to bring drag to the masses", hiring two drag queens to perform with her during her Las Vegas residency in 1979. The Advocate's Jeff Yarbrough described Cher as "one of the first superstars to 'play gay' with compassion and without a hint of stereotyping", as she portrays a lesbian in the 1983 film Silkwood. Cher's social activism has further solidified her status as a gay icon. She has headlined major LGBTQ events, including the 2013 Dance on the Pier Pride benefit in New York—the event's first sellout in five years—and the 40th Sydney Gay and Lesbian Mardi Gras in 2018, whose tickets sold out within three hours of her teasing the performance on Twitter. As the mother of a trans man, Chaz Bono, Cher has advocated for visibility and support for trans families.

=== Cultural stature ===
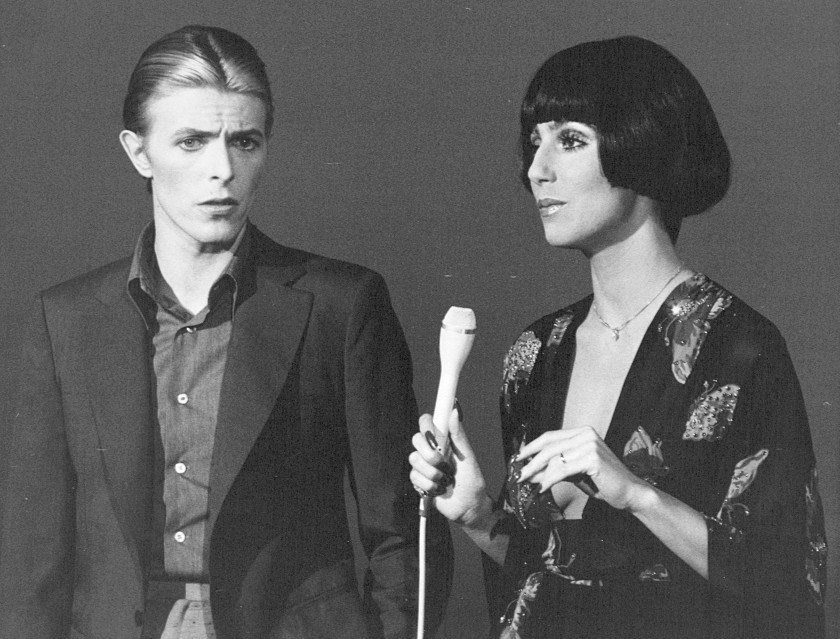
Cher with David Bowie on the variety show Cher, 1975; The Boston Globe paired them as "one of the original chameleons in pop music"

Cher has repeatedly reached the top of multiple entertainment fields since 1965. Billboard's Keith Caulfield wrote that "there's divas and then there's Cher". Rob Sheffield of Rolling Stone wrote that "there are no other careers remotely like hers in the history of pop music", calling her "the one-woman embodiment of the whole gaudy story of pop music". She has been widely referred to as the "Goddess of Pop" in publications such as The Washington Post, Time and Billboard. (Note: Cher has been referred to as the "Goddess of Pop" in various publications. Primary sources using the title include Billboard, Harper's Bazaar, Los Angeles Times, Love, The Mercury News, Rolling Stone, Time, USA Today, Vogue España and The Washington Post. Secondary sources describing Cher as "often called", "nicknamed" or "known as" the "Goddess of Pop" include ABC News, CR Fashion Book, The Cut, E!, The Independent and New York Post.) Music critic Jeff Miers credited Cher with setting the template for generations of female pop artists, citing her theatrical presentation, her seamless genre shifts and her knack for provoking without losing mainstream appeal. James Reed of The Boston Globe paired Cher with David Bowie as "one of the original chameleons in pop music, constantly in flux and challenging our perceptions of her".

Shon Faye of Dazed wrote that Cher's legacy underpins many modern pop stars: "If Madonna and Lady Gaga and Kylie [Minogue] and Cyndi Lauper were playing football, Cher would be the stadium they played on and the sun that shone down on them." According to The New York Times, Cher "earned her mononym" and inspired "an entire industry of imitators, both figurative and literal". The mononym was formalized in 1979, when she legally dropped her first name Cheryl along with the surnames Sarkisian (paternal), LaPiere (her stepfather's) and the married names Bono and Allman. Alexander Fury of The Independent described Cher's celebrity as "seemingly immortal" and operating at an "omnipotent, uni-monikered level". In a staged outtake from Joker (2019) aired on Jimmy Kimmel Live!, Joaquin Phoenix reacts to a crew member teasingly calling him Cher: "It's not even an insult. Cher, really? Singer, actor, dancer, fashion icon—how's that an insult?"

Frank Bruni of The New York Times wrote that Cher personifies "a magnitude of celebrity for which the word fame is pathetically insufficient". Bego emphasized her multifaceted career: "No one in the history of show business has had a career of the magnitude and scope of Cher's. She has been a teenage pop star, a television hostess, a fashion model, a rock star, a Broadway actress, an Oscar-winning movie star, a disco diva and the subject of a mountain of press coverage." Billboard's Joe Lynch stated, "The world would certainly be different if she hadn't stayed so irrevocably Cher from the start."

== In popular culture ==
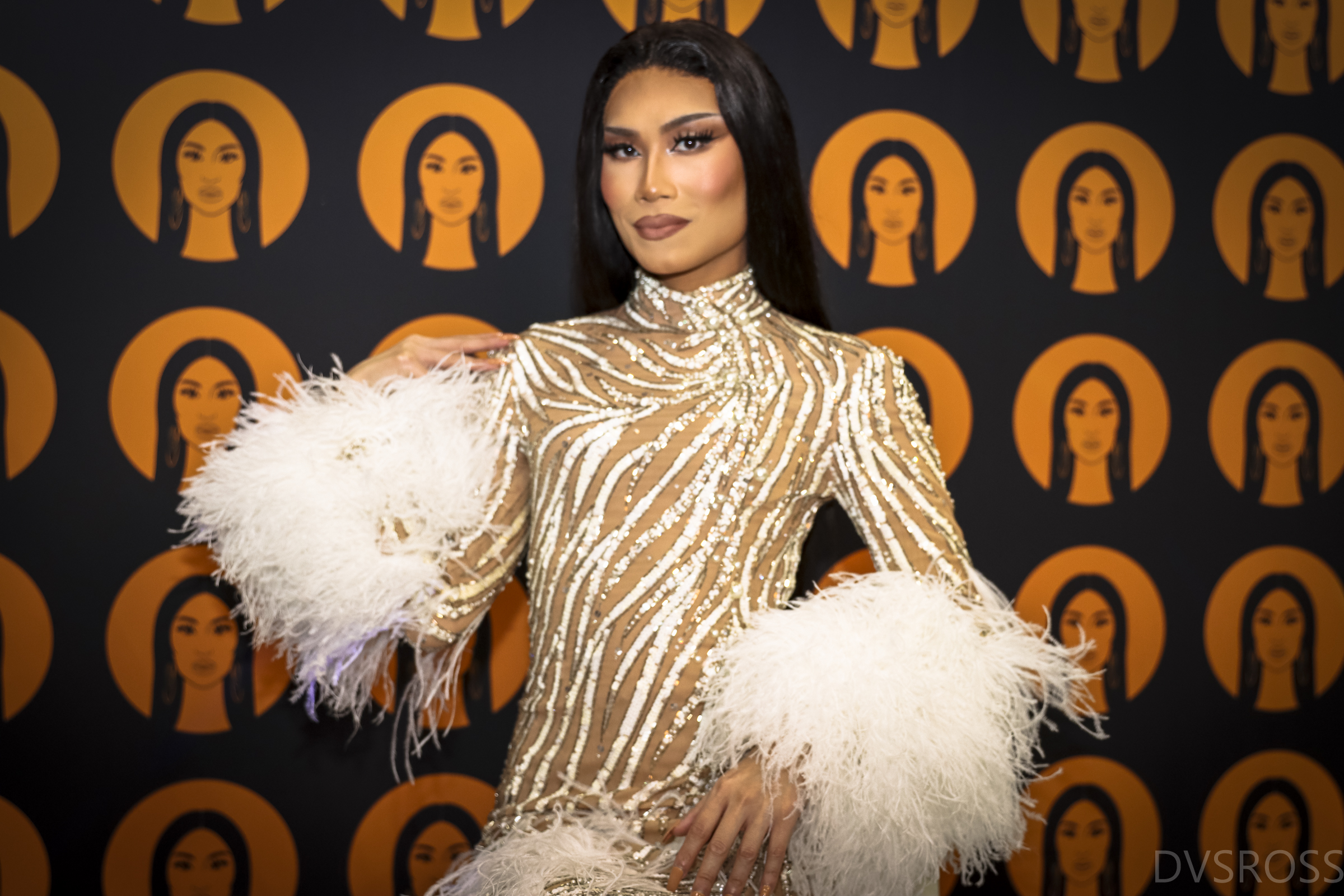
Drag performer Kahmora Hall at RuPaul's DragCon LA (2022), citing the multiplied-portrait backdrop of The Sonny & Cher Comedy Hour and Cher's 1974 "naked dress"

Cher's long-running presence in popular media has yielded a steady stream of references and tributes. Artists across a range of genres have referenced her by name in their songs, from Nickelback's "Rockstar" (2005) and the Flaming Lips' "She Don't Use Jelly" (1993) to hip hop recordings by Nicki Minaj, 2 Chainz and Snoop Dogg. (Note: Songs that reference Cher include: "2 Dollar Bill" by 2 Chainz, Lil Wayne and E-40; "All the Same" by Young Jeezy and E-40; "Chance to Advance" by D12; "Check It Out" by Grand Puba and Mary J. Blige; "Did It On'em" by Nicki Minaj; "Dis iz Brick City" by Redman; "Hammerhead" by Tin Machine; "Head of Household" by Jagged Edge; "Hollywood's Ending", "Murder She Wrote" and "P.M. Prima Donna" by Ookla the Mok; "I Got You" by Train; "(I'm Just a) Redneck in a Rock and Roll Bar" by Jerry Reed; "Laugh at Me" by Sonny; "Like You Do" by Kelly Price and Method Man; "Look at Me" by Trachtenburg Family Slideshow Players; "Lullaby" by Shawn Mullins; "The Morning" by Raekwon, 2 Chainz, Common, Kid Cudi, Cyhi the Prynce, D'banj and Pusha T; "One Nite Stand (of Wolves and Sheep)" by Sarah Connor and Wyclef Jean; "Out Last Night" by Kenny Chesney; "Rockstar" by Nickelback; "She Don't Use Jelly" by the Flaming Lips; "Snow Queen" by Elton John; "Stuck in the Moment" by Justin Bieber; "Whateva U Do" by Snoop Dogg; "Windpipe" by Wu-Tang Clan, Ol' Dirty Bastard, Ghostface Killah and RZA) In 1976, Mego Toys released a line of Sonny & Cher dolls; the Cher doll outsold Barbie to become the year's best-selling doll. In 1990, when Cher was 43, Ryan Murphy opened a concert review for the Miami Herald with what he called "an old gag" about the apocalypse: "What will survive a nuclear war?"—"Cockroaches and Cher." Her life was featured in the children's inspirational book series Reaching Your Goals (1992), which highlighted her "integrity" and "perseverance" as models of self-actualization: "Even when she needed money, she turned down movie roles that weren't right for her. Her goal has always been to be a good actress, not just a rich and famous one."

During Cher's early 1990s infomercial run, the ads were parodied on Saturday Night Live and referenced in Clueless (1995), whose protagonist Cher Horowitz jokes she was named after a "great [singer] of the past who now does infomercials". The 1997 The X-Files episode "The Post-Modern Prometheus" features a scientist's grotesque creature who idolizes Cher because of her role in Mask (1985), where her character cares for her disfigured son. Cher was the visual inspiration for Mother Gothel in Walt Disney Pictures' Tangled (2010); director Byron Howard stated that she "definitely was one of the people we looked at visually, as far as what gives you a striking character". Her life and career inspired the 2018 jukebox musical The Cher Show. The 2024 film Joker: Folie à Deux features a fantasy variety-show sequence in which Joker and Harley Quinn, played by Joaquin Phoenix and Lady Gaga, appear as Sonny & Cher; Variety described the pair as "a homicidal Sonny & Cher", and Sight and Sound noted that the scene echoed the "awkwardly self-aware banter" of The Sonny & Cher Comedy Hour.

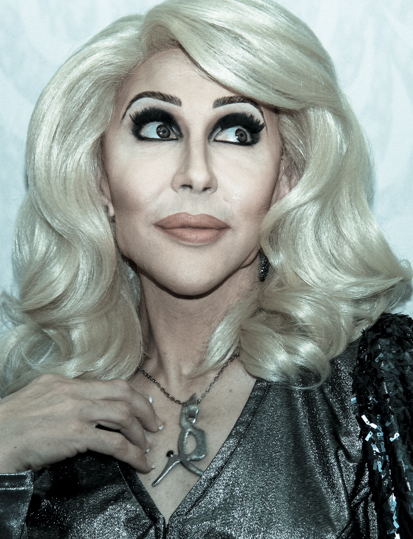
Professional Cher impersonator Chad Michaels at RuPaul's DragCon LA, 2018

Cher has appeared in various projects that draw on her own cultural persona. In 1993, she was invited by MTV to re-record Sonny & Cher's "I Got You Babe" with animated duo Beavis and Butt-Head, mocking her own image as they introduce her as "a chick that's got tattoos on her butt ... who's older ... done it a lot of times [and] used to be married to some dork" (referring to Sonny Bono). In the Farrelly brothers' comedy Stuck on You (2003), she played a satirical version of herself dating a high schooler (Frankie Muniz)—a direct nod to media scrutiny of her real-life relationships with younger men. Under her 1964 pseudonym Bonnie Jo Mason, Cher contributed to Wu-Tang Clan's album Once Upon a Time in Shaolin (2015), produced as a single physical copy and auctioned online as the most expensive album ever sold. Her casting as the mother of Donna Sheridan (Meryl Streep) in Mamma Mia! Here We Go Again (2018)—a three-year age gap from Streep—prompted director Ol Parker to remark, "Cher exists outside of time." For the soundtrack, Cher recorded two ABBA songs, including "Fernando", about which Björn Ulvaeus commented, "She makes 'Fernando' her own. It's her song now." Vulture responded that "every single movie ... would be infinitely better if it included Cher". In 2021, Cher made a cameo appearance as God in Pink's music video "All I Know So Far".

Cher's influence on LGBTQ culture is highlighted in the NBC sitcom Will & Grace, where she is frequently referenced as the idol of gay character Jack McFarland. She appears as herself in two episodes: 2000's "Gypsies, Tramps and Weed" (referencing her 1971 song "Gypsys, Tramps & Thieves"), which became the show's second-highest-rated episode; and 2002's "A.I.: Artificial Insemination", where she appears as Jack's version of God. Within the drag community, Cher's impact is evident in the reality competition RuPaul's Drag Race, which has honored her through challenges such as the musical performance "Cher: The Unauthorized Rusical" in season 10 and the runway theme "Everything Every-Cher All at Once" in season 16. Chad Michaels, a drag performer and professional Cher impersonator, gained mainstream recognition on the show. He won the Snatch Game challenge in season 4 for his portrayal of Cher and later won the first season of RuPaul's Drag Race All Stars.

== Achievements and recognition ==
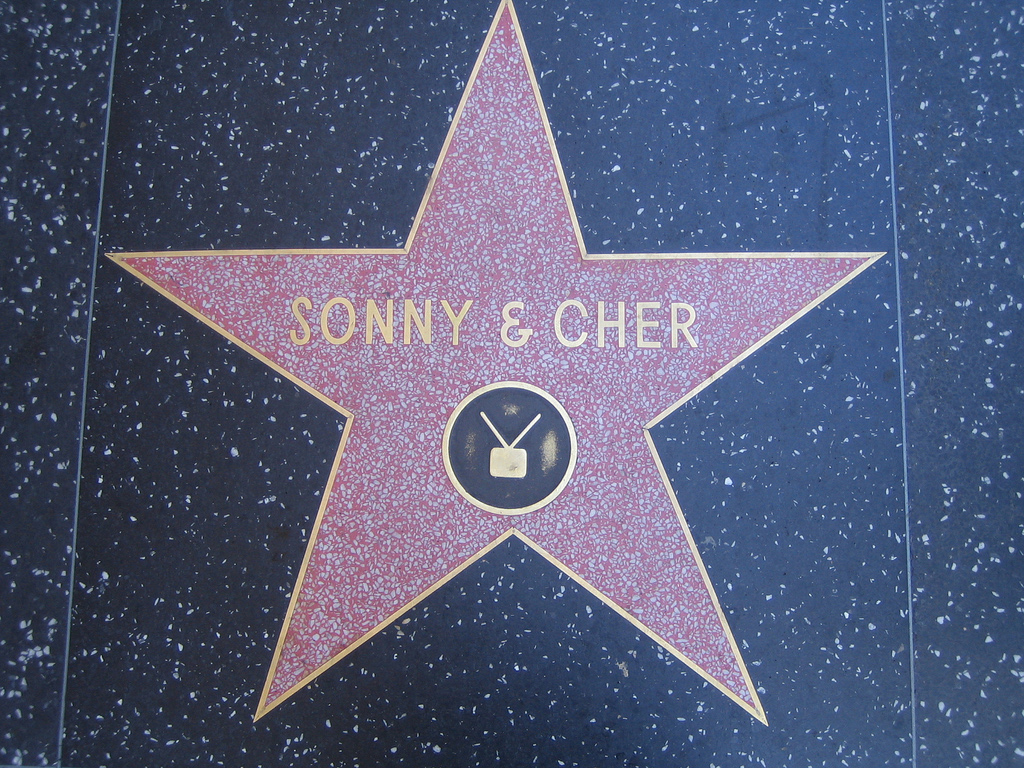
Star for Sonny & Cher on the Hollywood Walk of Fame

Cher's career across music, film and television has produced a series of distinctions that reflect the breadth of her work. She is one of five actor-singers to have had a US number-one single and won an acting Academy Award. In 1988, she became the first performer to win an acting Oscar and earn an RIAA-certified gold album in the same year since the inception of gold awards in 1958. She is one of the few artists to win three of the four major American entertainment awards (EGOT—Emmy, Grammy, Oscar and Tony). In 2024, Cher was inducted into the Rock and Roll Hall of Fame—the first and, to date, only performer to have won an Academy Award for acting and been inducted into the Rock Hall.

Cher has been recognized through a range of institutional and ceremonial honors. She has a star on the Hollywood Walk of Fame as part of Sonny & Cher, dedicated in 1998; she was offered a solo star in 1983 but declined the required personal appearance. Her handprints and footprints were set in the forecourt of Grauman's Chinese Theatre in 2010. In 2018, Whoopi Goldberg presented Cher with the Kennedy Center Honors, the highest cultural recognition in the US.

Cher has received numerous lifetime and career achievement honors, including the 1985 Woman of the Year Award from the Hasty Pudding Theatricals society at Harvard University, the Legend Award at the 1999 World Music Awards, the Influence on Fashion Award from the Council of Fashion Designers of America (CFDA) in 1999, the Lucy Award for Innovation in Television at the 2000 Women in Film Awards and the Artist Achievement Award at the 2002 Billboard Music Awards—presented by Steven Tyler in recognition of her having "helped redefine popular music with massive success on the Billboard charts". Later honors include the Icon Award at the 2017 Billboard Music Awards, the Ambassador for the Arts Award at the 2019 Chita Rivera Awards for Dance and Choreography, the Spirit of Katharine Hepburn Award in 2020 and the Grammy Lifetime Achievement Award in 2026.

Cher has also featured in broader cultural rankings and milestones. VH1 ranked her 41st on "The 200 Greatest Pop Culture Icons" (2003) and Rolling Stone ranked Sonny & Cher 18th on its 2015 list of the "20 Greatest Duos of All Time". Esquire ranked her 44th on "The 75 Greatest Women of All Time" (2016). In November 2024, Cher: The Memoir debuted at number one on The New York Times Best Seller list, holding the position for three weeks. In 2026, Forbes ranked Cher 130th in its inaugural "Self-Made 250", a list of the greatest living self-made Americans.

=== In music ===
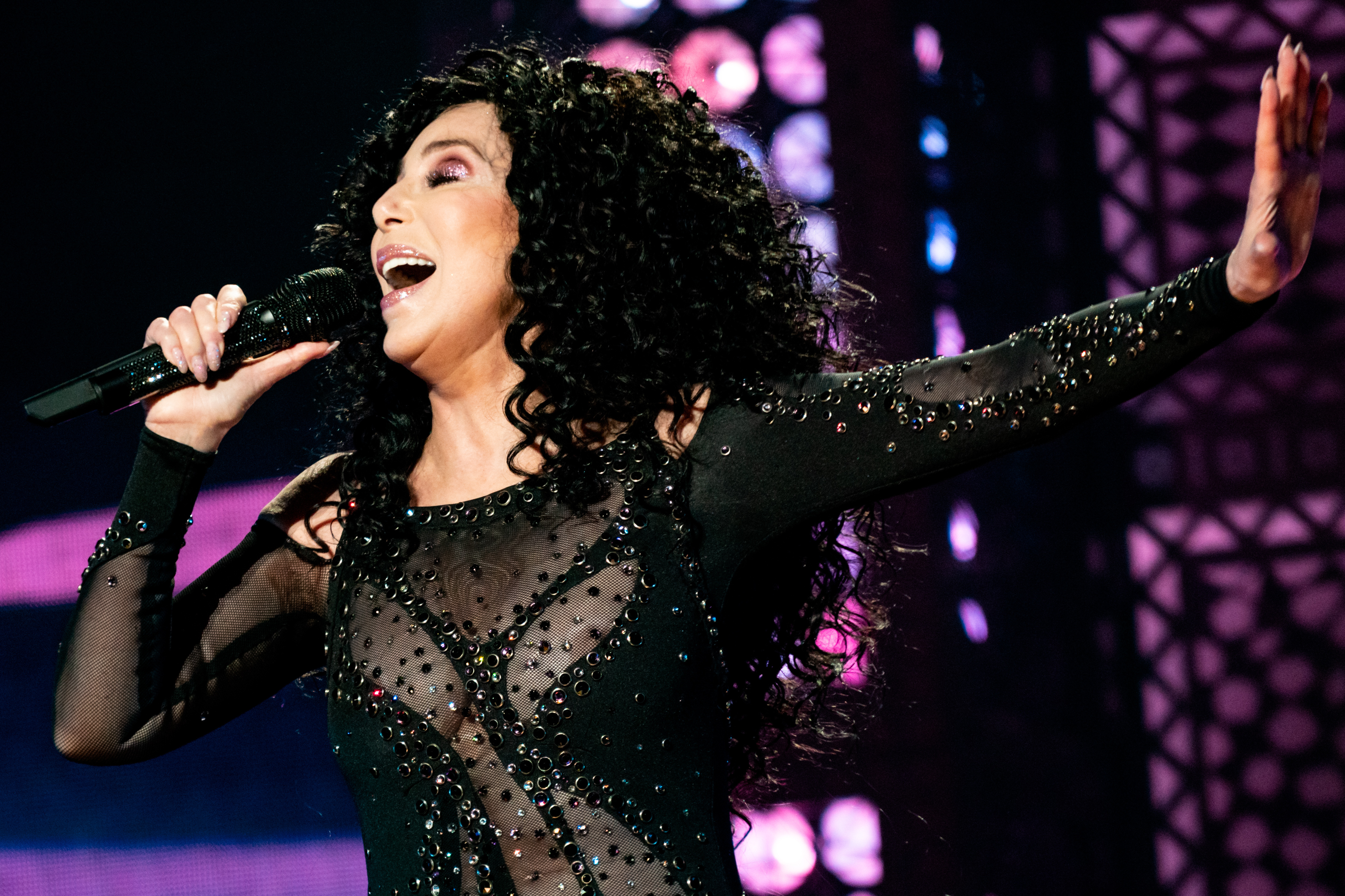
Cher on the Here We Go Again Tour in 2019, wearing a sheer bodysuit with cutouts evoking her late-1980s stage costumes

Cher has sold over 100 million records as a solo artist, ranking among the best-selling music artists of all time. Her breakthrough single "I Got You Babe" (1965) is a Grammy Hall of Fame inductee and appeared on Rolling Stone's 2003 list of the "500 Greatest Songs of All Time". Billboard named "Gypsys, Tramps & Thieves" (1971) one of the greatest songs of the 20th century and listed "If I Could Turn Back Time" (1989) among its "500 Best Pop Songs" in 2023. "Believe" (1998), the UK's best-selling single by a female artist, was included on Rolling Stone's updated "500 Greatest Songs of All Time" list in 2021 and 2024 and ranked eighth in a 2003 BBC poll of the world's favorite songs—the only American entry.

Billboard placed Cher at number 49 on its 2015 list of the "Greatest Hot 100 Artists of All Time". With 16 Billboard number-one singles, she is the only solo artist with a number-one single on a US Billboard chart in seven consecutive decades. (Note: Separately from the record of seven consecutive decades with a number-one single on a US Billboard chart, Cher (1960s–2000s) and Madonna (1980s–2020s) are the only women to have debuted singles on the Billboard Hot 100—the publication's main singles chart—in five consecutive decades; Cher also debuted on the chart in the 2020s with "DJ Play a Christmas Song" (2023), for six non-consecutive decades.) In the 1960s, she topped the Hot 100 with "I Got You Babe" (1965) as part of Sonny & Cher. She scored three solo Hot 100 number-ones in the 1970s: "Gypsys, Tramps & Thieves" (1971), "Half-Breed" and "Dark Lady" (both 1973), while Sonny & Cher's "All I Ever Need Is You" led Adult Contemporary in 1972.

From the 1980s, Cher's number-one singles shifted to other Billboard charts. She topped Adult Contemporary with "After All" and "If I Could Turn Back Time" (both 1989) and multiple charts with "Believe" (1998), including the Hot 100. Between 1999 and 2002, four of her singles topped Dance Club Songs: "Strong Enough" and "All or Nothing" (both 1999), and "Song for the Lonely" and "A Different Kind of Love Song" (both 2002). She continued to score Dance Club Songs number-ones with "When the Money's Gone" (2003), "You Haven't Seen the Last of Me" (2011) and "Woman's World" (2013). "DJ Play a Christmas Song" (2023) reached number one on multiple charts, including Adult Contemporary.

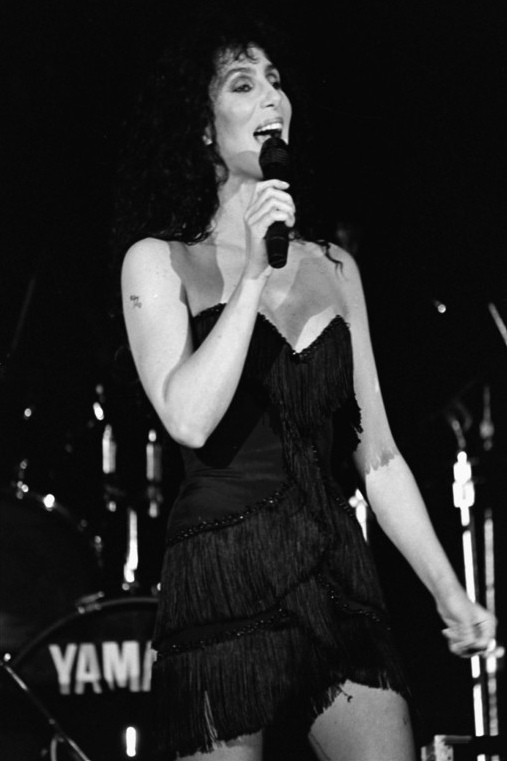
Cher performing during a benefit concert for Elizabeth Glaser Pediatric AIDS Foundation, 1989

Cher is the only solo artist with new material in the Official UK Top 40 in seven consecutive decades (1960s–2020s), most recently with a top-ten cover of Oasis' "Stop Crying Your Heart Out" (2020), recorded with charity supergroup BBC Radio 2 Allstars in support of Children in Need; and "DJ Play a Christmas Song" (2023), which made her the oldest female artist—at 77—to enter the chart. She held the previous record (Note: Brenda Lee surpassed Cher's record for the longest span between a first and most recent number-one single on the US Billboard Hot 100 in December 2023, when "Rockin' Around the Christmas Tree" reached number one for the first time since its 1958 release. Until then, Lee's only number-one hits had been "I'm Sorry" and "I Want to Be Wanted", both released in 1960.) for the longest span between a first and most recent number-one single on the US Billboard Hot 100—33 years—from "I Got You Babe" (1965) to "Believe" (1999). (Note: The span between Cher's first and most recent number-one single on the US Billboard Hot 100 is 33 years, seven months and three weeks, from the first week at number one for "I Got You Babe", the week ending August 14, 1965, to the final week at number one for "Believe", the week ending April 3, 1999.) At 52, she was the oldest female artist to top both the Hot 100 and the UK singles chart. (Note: Cher's record as the oldest woman to top the US Billboard Hot 100 was surpassed by Mariah Carey, who was 53 when "All I Want for Christmas Is You" (1994) reached number one in December 2023, and Brenda Lee, who was 78 when "Rockin' Around the Christmas Tree" (1958) topped the chart that same month. Her record on the UK singles chart was surpassed by Kate Bush, who was 63 when "Running Up That Hill" (1985) reached number one in June 2022. Excluding catalog songs, Cher remains the oldest female artist to top both charts.)

At the height of Sonny & Cher's 1965 breakthrough, five of their songs appeared simultaneously in the Billboard Hot 100's top 50—a feat previously achieved only by Elvis Presley and the Beatles. Their debut album, Look at Us (1965), spent eight weeks at number two on the Billboard 200, behind the Beatles' Help!. Cash Box magazine described Sonny & Cher, the Beatles and the Rolling Stones as "global stars" whose success in both the US and UK showed that national origin was no longer a barrier to international stardom. Time's Ginia Bellafante described the duo as rock's "it" couple.

Sonny & Cher's "Little Man" reached number one in Sweden in 1966, while Cher's solo recordings "Bang Bang (My Baby Shot Me Down)" and "Sunny" topped charts in Italy and Norway, respectively. "Gypsys, Tramps & Thieves" (1971) became the first single by a solo artist to rank number one on the US Billboard Hot 100 at the same time as on the Canadian singles chart. When "Dark Lady" became her fourth Hot 100 number one in March 1974, she tied with Rosemary Clooney, Patti Page and Connie Francis for the most number-one singles by a female solo artist in US history at the time. (Note: Some sources credit Cher as the female solo artist with the most US Billboard Hot 100 number-one singles when "Dark Lady" topped the chart in March 1974—counting Sonny & Cher's "I Got You Babe" as her first number one. This claim likely stems from Billboard's current rules, which credit a song to a solo artist if their name appears in the official billing. Billboard's reporting in 1974 did not include "I Got You Babe" among Cher's solo number ones, suggesting that the current rules were not in effect at the time.)

Heart of Stone (1989) peaked at number one in Australia—her first album to top a national chart—and its second single, "If I Could Turn Back Time", spent seven weeks at number one in the country. In 1991, "The Shoop Shoop Song (It's in His Kiss)" topped the UK singles chart for five weeks—her first British number-one solo single and the first time she topped the chart since "I Got You Babe" in 1965. That same year, the album Love Hurts spent six weeks at number one in the UK—her first album to top the British charts. A year later, the UK-only compilation album Greatest Hits: 1965–1992 topped the UK chart for seven weeks and became the best-selling album by a female artist of 1992. In 1995, Cher returned to the top of the UK singles chart with the charity single "Love Can Build a Bridge", recorded alongside Chrissie Hynde, Neneh Cherry and Eric Clapton.

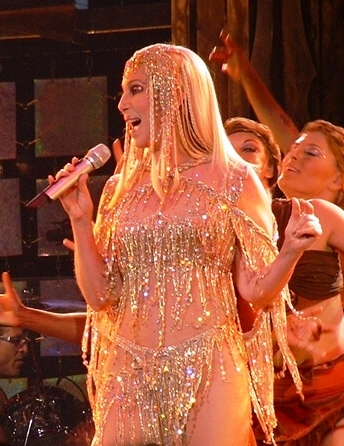
Cher on Living Proof: The Farewell Tour (2002–2005), then the highest-grossing tour by a female artist

Believe (1998) became Cher's biggest global commercial success: the album sold 11 million copies worldwide, earning quadruple platinum certification in the US and gold, platinum or multi-platinum status in 39 countries. Its title track debuted at number one in the UK, held the position for seven weeks and became the country's best-selling single by a female artist. In the US, it was named 1999's number-one song, and altogether the song reached number one in 23 countries. Entertainment Weekly emphasized the album's role in introducing her to a new generation of fans who "hadn't yet been born when 'I Got You Babe' ruled the charts in 1965".

The Greatest Hits (1999), overseen by Cher for international markets, reached number one on the European Top 100 Albums chart. Her follow-up studio album Living Proof (2001) reached number one in Greece. Closer to the Truth (2013), her first studio album in twelve years, debuted at number three on the Billboard 200—her highest solo peak on the chart. Dancing Queen (2018), her collection of ABBA covers, matched that debut, and its 153,000 first-week units marked the year's largest sales week for a pop album by a female artist.

Cher launched Living Proof: The Farewell Tour in 2002, promoted as her final concert tour. By October 2003, it had grossed $145 million from 200 shows with 2.2 million attendees, becoming the highest-grossing concert tour by a female artist at the time. Her 2003 earnings of $33.1 million made her the year's highest-paid female musician, according to Forbes. The tour concluded in April 2005 after 325 dates, with total gross exceeding $250 million and earning Cher a Guinness World Record for the highest-grossing tour by a female artist.

Cher's Dressed to Kill Tour (2014) grossed $54.9 million from 49 sold-out North American shows before being cut short by illness. In 2014, Billboard ranked her the 23rd highest-grossing touring act since 1990, with $351.6 million in total revenue and 4.5 million attendees across 548 shows. 12 years later, Pollstar ranked Cher seventh on their list of "The Millennium's Most Popular Women in Touring", with $525.8 million in total revenue and 5.6 million tickets sold across 716 shows.

=== In film and television ===
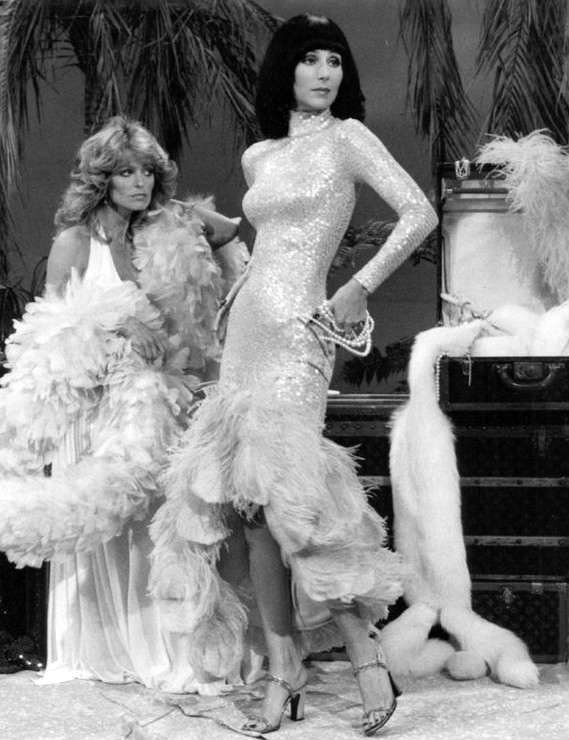
Cher with Farrah Fawcett on The Sonny and Cher Show, 1976

The Sonny & Cher Comedy Hour (1971–1974) drew more than 30 million viewers weekly over its three-year run, earning Cher the Golden Globe Award for Best Actress – Television Series Musical or Comedy in 1974. Her 1976 reunion with Sonny, The Sonny and Cher Show, was the first program ever to star a divorced couple. In 1983, Cher received the CableACE Award for Best Actress in a Variety Program for her NBC special Cher... A Celebration at Caesars. In 1999, Cher performed "The Star-Spangled Banner" at Super Bowl XXXIII and co-headlined the TV special VH1 Divas Live '99, which drew 19.4 million viewers and became the highest-rated program in VH1's history at the time. The NBC special Cher: The Farewell Tour (2003), which earned Cher the Primetime Emmy Award for Outstanding Variety, Music or Comedy Special, drew 17 million viewers, becoming the highest-rated network concert special of the year.

Mask (1985), Cher's first critical and commercial success as a leading actress, earned her the Cannes Film Festival Award for Best Actress. In 1987, she starred in three films, with The Witches of Eastwick and Moonstruck ranking among the year's top 10 highest-grossing movies; her performance in Moonstruck earned her the Academy Award for Best Actress and the Golden Globe Award for Best Actress – Motion Picture Comedy or Musical. Billboard later ranked Cher's Moonstruck performance first on its list of "The 100 Best Acting Performances by Musicians in Movies", describing it as "the standard by which you mentally check all others"; the American Film Institute named the film the eighth-greatest romantic comedy of all time. By the end of the 1980s, Cher had become one of the most bankable actresses of the decade, commanding $1 million per film. She made her directorial debut in 1996 with a segment of HBO's anthology film If These Walls Could Talk, in which she also starred; it became HBO's highest-rated original movie to date, drawing 6.9 million viewers.

People included Cher among its "100 Greatest Movie Stars of Our Time" and Biography ranked her the third-favorite leading actress of all time, behind Katharine Hepburn and Audrey Hepburn. The New York Times Magazine included Cher in its annual "Best Actors" list for 2020, making her the first actor featured without appearing in a theatrical release that year. It praised her performance in Moonstruck (1987) as "radiant" and a source of comfort during the COVID-19 pandemic.

== Among other artists ==
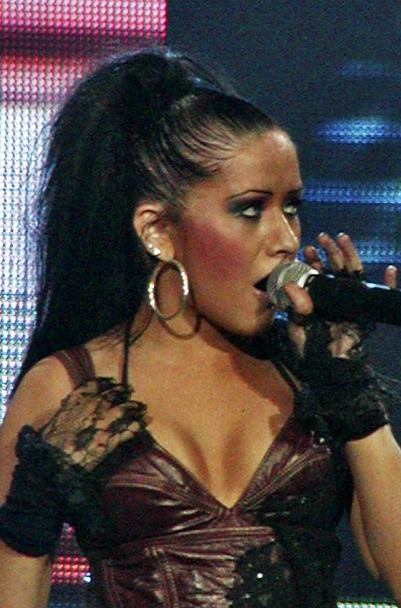
Christina Aguilera

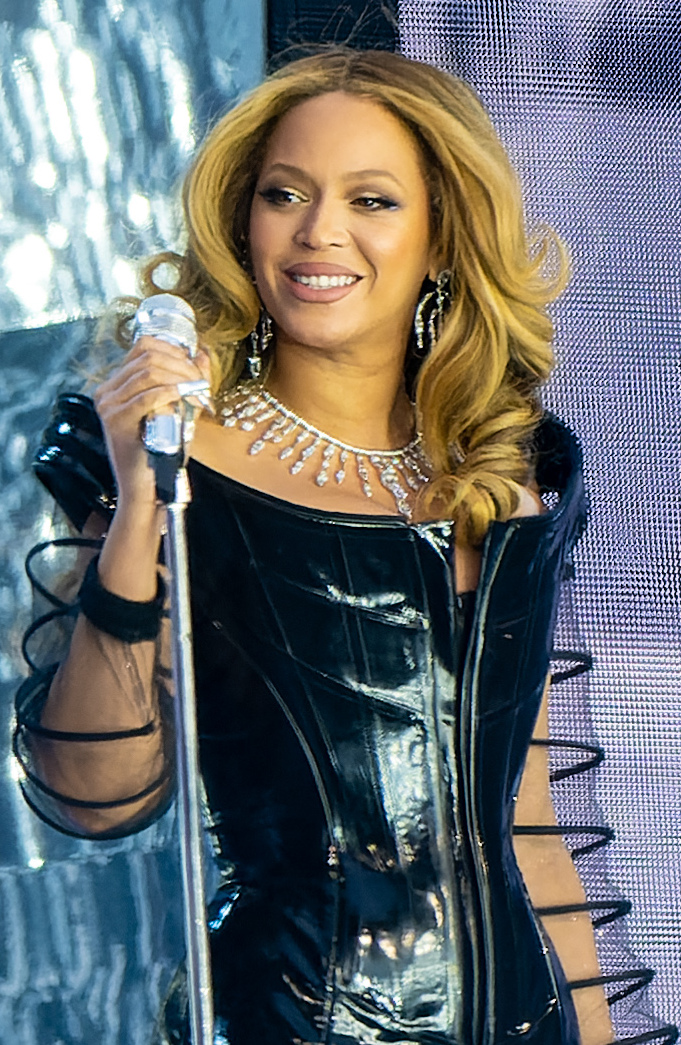
Beyoncé

Lady Gaga

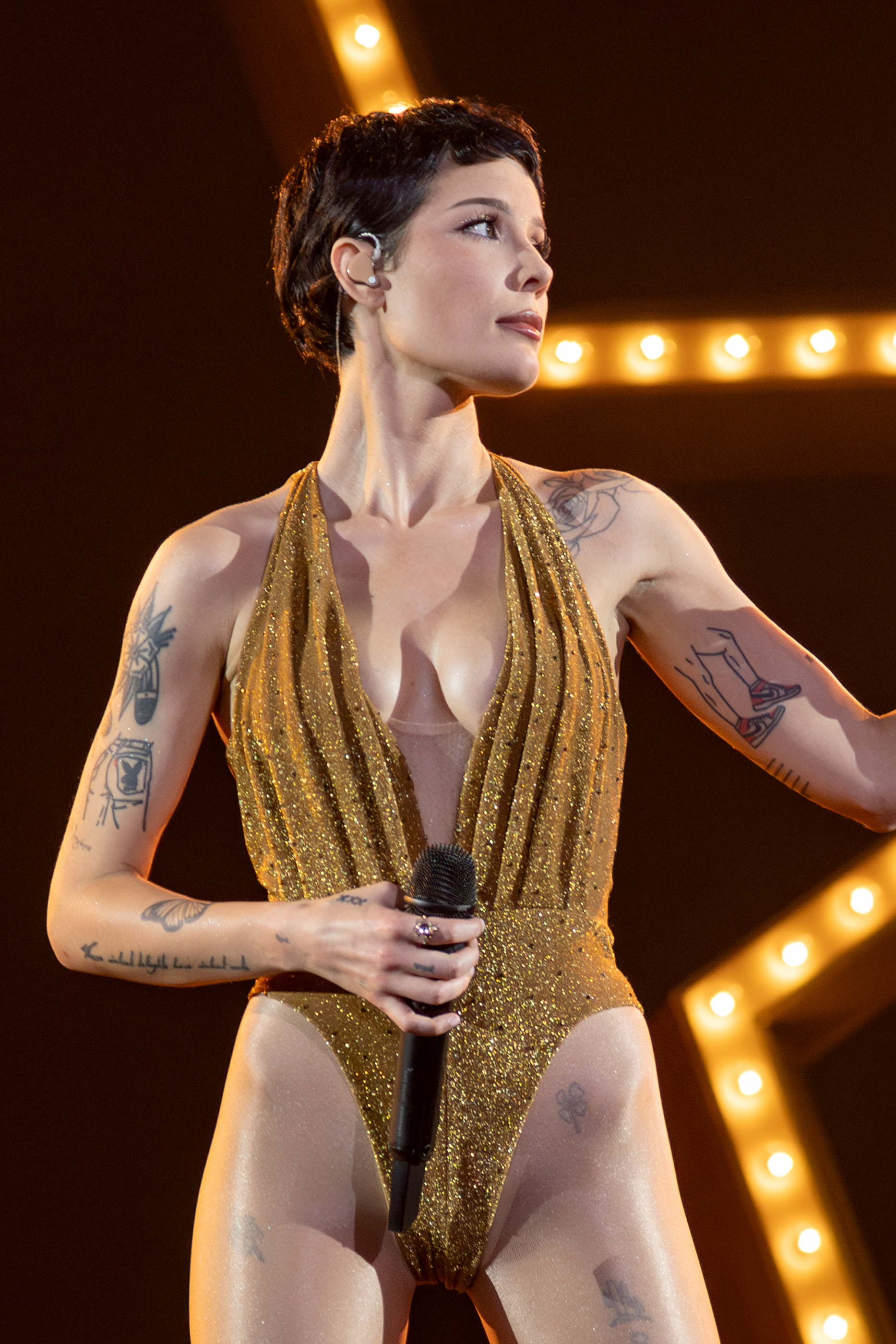
Halsey

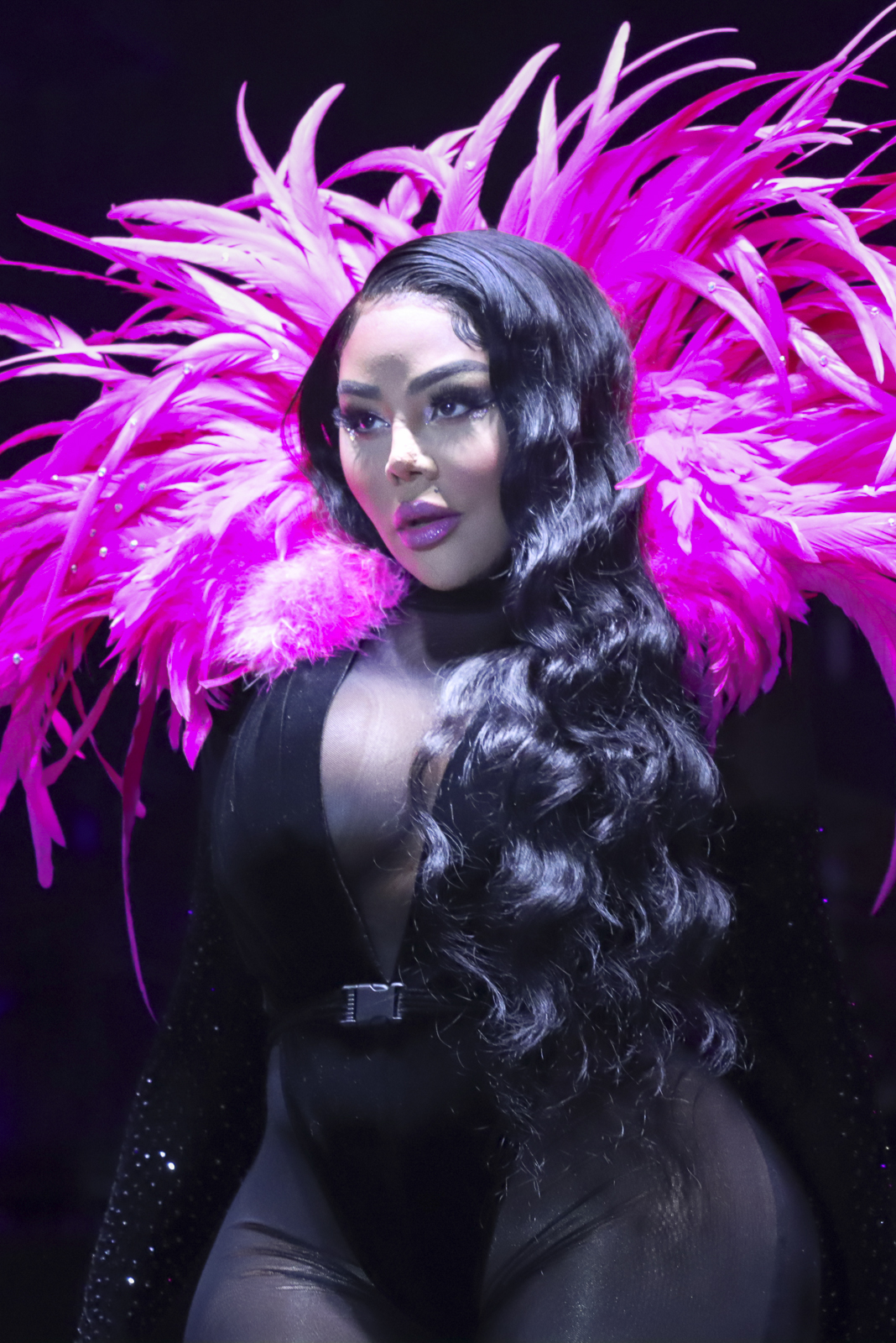
Lil' Kim

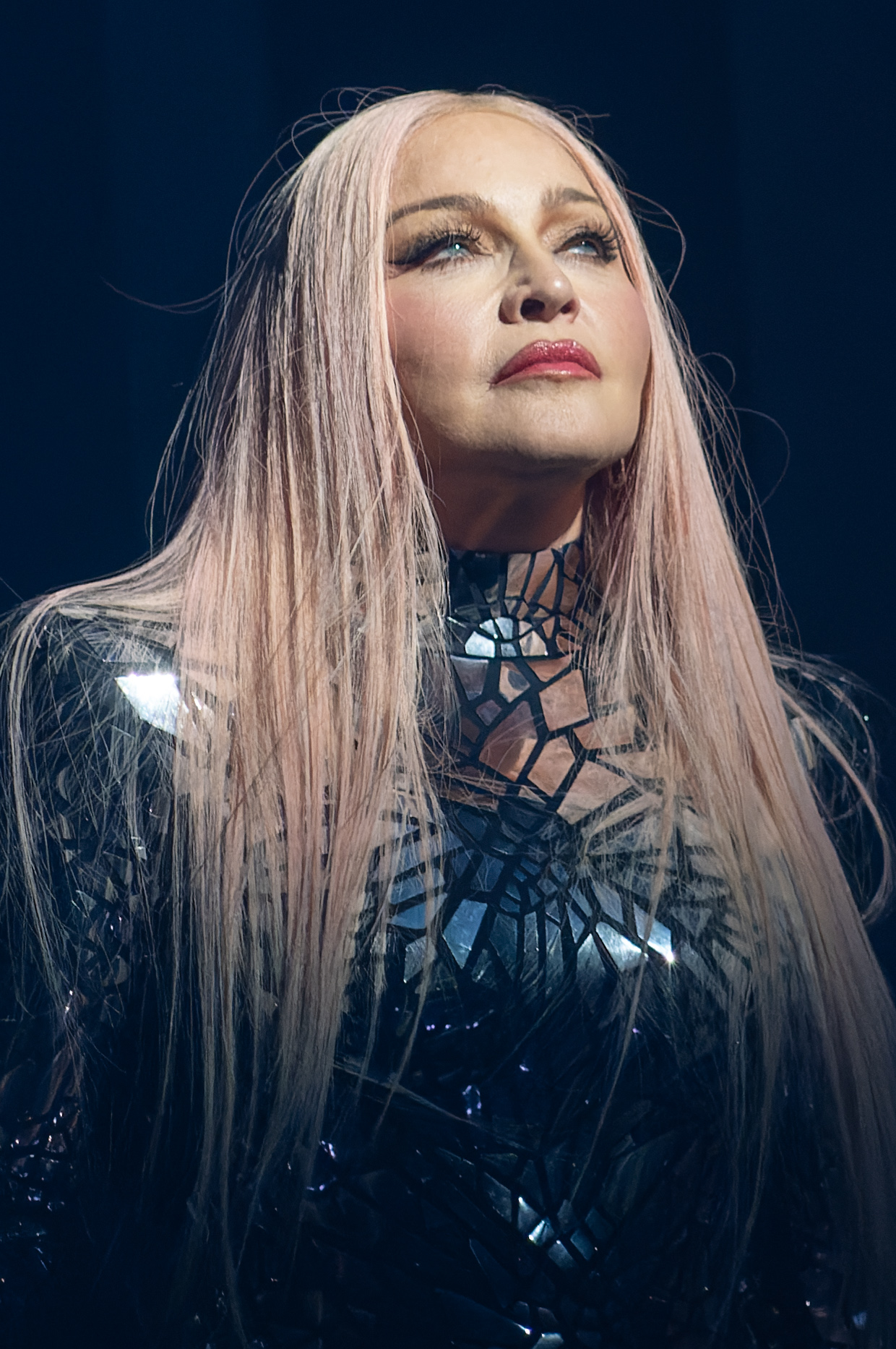
Madonna

Cher has influenced generations of entertainers, including those pictured above.

Cher's career model—the multi-domain entertainer operating under a single name—has shaped artists who came after her and how critics have understood pop lineage. At a 1983 press conference, Madonna introduced herself: "It's Madonna. Just like Cher. Remember it." Writing for the Miami Herald in 1990, Ryan Murphy said Cher "turned transformation into an art form", adding that without her, "there might be no Madonna as we know her, no Prince, either"; in 2013, music critic Jeff Miers called Madonna "her generation's Cher". Singer-actresses Jennifer Lopez and Dove Cameron have both pointed to Cher as proof that artists do not have to choose between the two. Lopez said Cher represented "the kind of career I'd hoped to have ... I want it all", while Cameron recalled: "Growing up in the industry, they always tell you to pick one ... [Cher] taught me that anything is possible [and] that you can't let anyone pigeonhole you." For People's 2026 "World's Most Beautiful" issue, Cameron recreated a 1975 look from Cher, calling that connection "my blood".

Lady Gaga said she absorbed Cher's image from childhood, citing the music video for "If I Could Turn Back Time" as a formative moment and the bodysuit Cher wore in it as her favorite Cher look: "I knew that was the kind of woman I would become." Beyoncé cited Cher and Diana Ross as fashion inspirations who "looked like superstars and never played it safe": "When they were onstage, they gave you drama—and I love drama." Kim Kardashian, who has named Cher her "style icon of life", has repeatedly recreated Cher's 1970s looks: at the 2015 Met Gala, she wore a contemporary version of Cher's 1974 "naked dress"; she posed as Cher on the September 2017 cover of Harper's Bazaar Arabia; and for Halloween that year, she recreated the gold sequined two-piece Cher wore to the 1973 Academy Awards. Fashion designer Marc Jacobs credited Cher with shaping his aesthetic from childhood, dedicated his final Louis Vuitton collection to her and designed a custom gown for her 2015 Met Gala appearance. Others who have cited Cher as a fashion inspiration include singers Lizzo and Bruno Mars, rapper Lil' Kim, actress Gemma Chan and model Emily Ratajkowski.

Britney Spears covered Sonny & Cher's "The Beat Goes On" on her debut album ...Baby One More Time (1999) and performed it in a long black wig at that year's World Music Awards, where Cher received the Legend Award. Spears later named Cher as her requested duet partner for the recording of her Dream Within a Dream Tour in November 2001, though Cher could not attend. Christina Aguilera traced the "butt-less chaps" she wore in the music video for "Dirrty" (2002) to watching the music video for "If I Could Turn Back Time" as a child against her grandmother's wishes, and said she looks to Cher as a mentor. Halsey named Cher as the inspiration for "Letter to God (1974)" on The Great Impersonator (2024), an album whose concept assigns each track to an artist who shaped her identity. She called "Dark Lady" (1974) "one of my favorite Cher songs" and recreated Cher's 1978 Bob Mackie blue jumpsuit and silver boots for the album's promotion.

The "Cher effect"—the stylistic use of Auto-Tune she introduced on "Believe"—has been claimed by later artists as a precursor to their own work. Kanye West credited Cher as the originator of the technique he adopted on 808s & Heartbreak (2008). Indie rock singer-songwriter Lucy Dacus cited Cher's "pioneering use of Auto-Tune" as an inspiration for her song "Partner in Crime": "Even with the Auto-Tune, you can tell that it's Cher and nobody else." Dacus later covered "Believe", stripping the Auto-Tune and transforming the song into dream pop. Sasha Frere-Jones of The New Yorker noted that radical pitch alteration "showed up repeatedly" after "Believe", citing Madonna's Music (2000) as among the earliest examples. Lil Wayne, T-Pain, Daft Punk and the Black Eyed Peas have also been named as inheritors of the "Cher effect". Jon O'Brien of the Recording Academy credited "Believe" with prompting a wave of veteran pop divas to follow Cher into dance music, including Diana Ross' "Not Over You Yet" (1999), Tina Turner's "When the Heartache Is Over" (1999) and Donna Summer's "I Will Go With You (Con te partirò)" (1999). (Note: Contemporary criticism had already drawn the parallel: reviewing Tina Turner's Twenty Four Seven for Billboard in 1999, Michael Paoletta wrote that lead single "When the Heartache Is Over" was "reminiscent of Cher's 'Believe'—both musically and lyrically", adding that Turner had enlisted Metro Productions, the producers of Cher's Believe, for the album.) O'Brien also identified subsequent dance albums by Madonna (Confessions on a Dance Floor), Kylie Minogue (Tension) and Cyndi Lauper (Bring Ya to the Brink) as part of the same trend.

Cher's stagecraft has been directly adopted. Pink began learning aerial silks in 2004 after watching Cher's dancers perform on them during Living Proof: The Farewell Tour. She later wrote two songs for Cher's Closer to the Truth (2013): "It's such an honor. I finally feel like a songwriter." RuPaul has described his drag persona as containing "a spoonful of Cher", credited Cher's television specials with teaching him "how to emcee a show" and lifted the runway segment of The RuPaul Show from her 1975 variety series. In a 1992 interview, before his commercial breakthrough, RuPaul said a Cher impersonation was a mainstay of his live act. BBC's Fraser McAlpine traced a visual lineage between Miley Cyrus straddling a wrecking ball in the music video for "Wrecking Ball" (2013) and Cher straddling a cannon in the music video for "If I Could Turn Back Time" (1989). Cher publicly criticized Cyrus' 2013 MTV Video Music Awards performance—"chick, don't stick out your tongue if it's coated"—but walked the criticism back days later, saying she should have framed Cyrus as "pushing the envelope, being an artist": "If I don't practice my principles, I lose them." Cyrus later cited the episode as a marker of arrival: "I had Cher come after me. That's when I thought I had really made it ... when these legends, and these icons, and these artists that we look up to ... when they hate us, it's still a compliment."

Cher's screen work has drawn citations from fellow actors and filmmakers. For her first leading film role in A Star Is Born (2018), Gaga was advised by the film's co-writer Eric Roth to study Cher's performance in Moonstruck. Drew Barrymore named Cher among her favorite screen actresses, citing Silkwood (1983), Mask (1985), Moonstruck (1987) and The Witches of Eastwick (1987): "She's strong and comedic and incredibly brave, but shows vulnerability. I think she's the epitome of rock & roll." Meryl Streep, her Silkwood co-star, said Cher's variety-show acting "made everybody else on TV look like they were trying too hard, pushing". Of Cher's Moonstruck performance, Streep added that it was "completely effortless ... funny, heartbreaking, inimitable—no one else could've done it that way." Nicolas Cage, her Moonstruck co-star, said Cher's "huge heart" came through "not only in her music but as a screen performer." Sam Elliott, who co-starred with Cher in Mask (1985), said he had been a fan since childhood, when he and his mother had watched The Sonny & Cher Comedy Hour "religiously".

Cher's influence has been documented across national borders. Brazilian actress Cleo Pires dropped her surname in direct imitation of Cher. Brazilian singer Marina Sena described Cher as the international standard against which she measured her own primary influence: "Gal Costa did in Brazil what Cher did abroad." For her 2022 Lollapalooza performance, Sena wore a crystal-embroidered fringe outfit she identified as inspired by Cher. American rapper Saweetie recalled singing "Believe" into her Filipino grandmother's broom as a toddler; after meeting Cher, she credited the encounter with reshaping her debut album's creative direction, feeling it needed "soul" and "spirit". Helena Vondráčková, profiled by Billboard as "the Czech Republic's answer to Cher", acknowledged Cher as an inspiration for her dance-music reinvention at 53.

When Cher was inducted into the Rock and Roll Hall of Fame in 2024, Zendaya delivered the induction speech in a Bob Mackie gown evoking a 1972 look of Cher's, thanking her for "being an advocate, for being an ally [and] for painting the way for so many humans of all kinds to live in and speak their truth". The Hall's permanent record of Cher's induction names Dua Lipa, Gaga, Aguilera, Cyrus and Beyoncé, along with fellow inductees Cyndi Lauper, Pat Benatar and Neil Giraldo, as artists carrying her influence.

== See also ==
- Cher as a gay icon
- Culture of the United States
