= Cher as a gay icon =

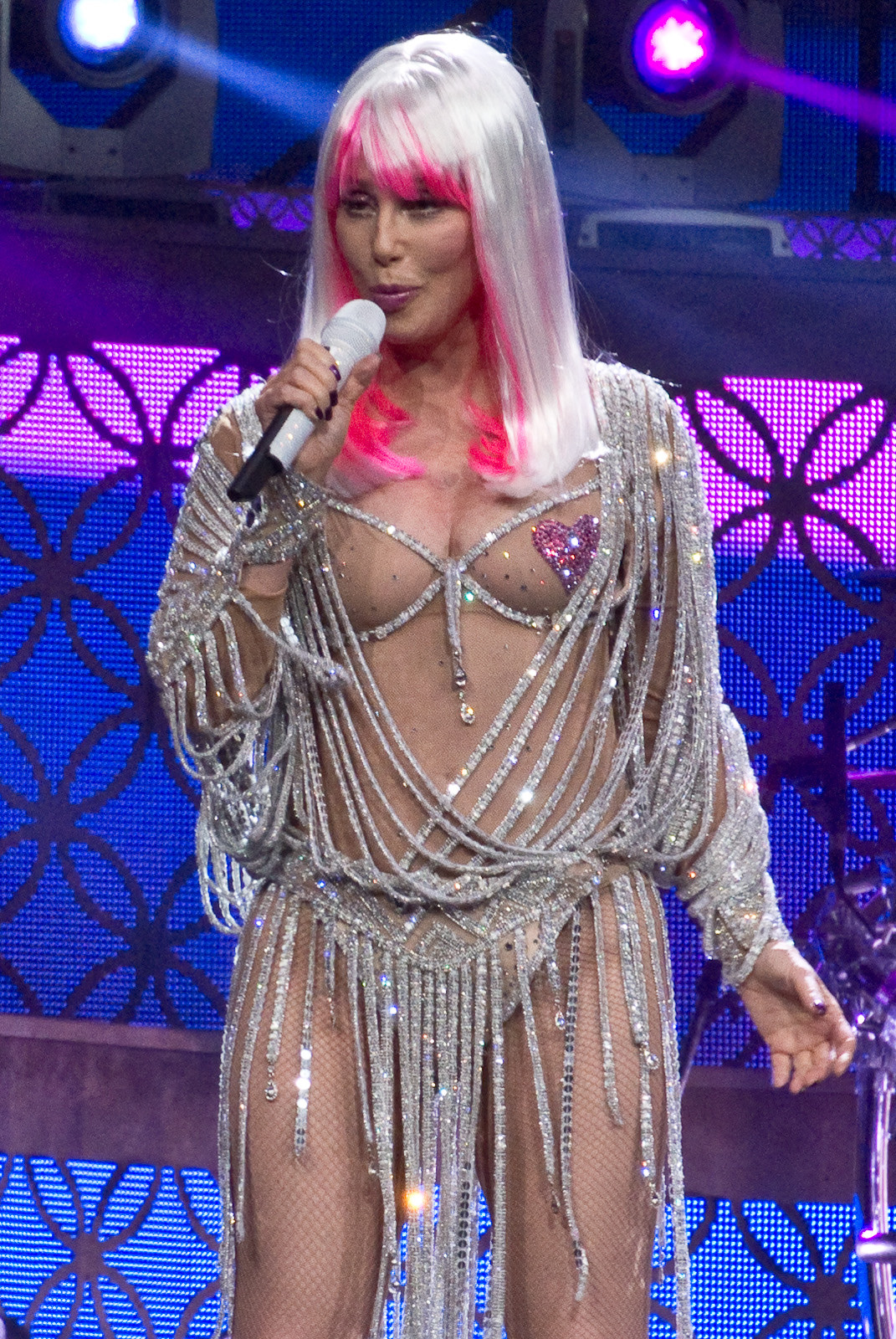
Cher performing in 2014; her visual style has been described as "feminine drag"

Cher is an American entertainer whose status as a gay icon has been a defining aspect of her public image since the late 1970s. Her appeal within the LGBTQ community is attributed to her vocal androgyny, theatrical performances, bold fashion and a public image centered on provocation and reinvention. The Advocate's Jeff Yarbrough called Cher "one of the first superstars to 'play gay' with compassion and without a hint of stereotyping", as she portrays a lesbian in the 1983 film Silkwood. Some of her songs, including "If I Could Turn Back Time" and "Believe", are considered gay anthems.

From the beginning of her career, Cher's deep contralto voice was mistaken for a male vocal. Her long-standing collaboration with designer Bob Mackie produced an image defined by wigs and exaggerated femininity that scholars have linked to drag performance, and some of her concert tours have incorporated drag queens and cross-dressing into the staging. In her films, she often portrays women who help marginalized male characters navigate mainstream society. Some critics have read these elements, alongside her stylized use of Auto-Tune on "Believe" (1998), as forms of camp and gender play.

Cher started advocating for HIV/AIDS awareness in the mid-1980s, and her advocacy for LGBTQ rights was influenced by the coming out and later gender transition of her son Chaz Bono. She received the GLAAD Vanguard Award in 1998 and the amfAR Award of Inspiration in 2015. Cher is frequently imitated by drag queens; RuPaul has cited her as a formative influence and RuPaul's Drag Race has honored her through dedicated challenges. Cher has credited the LGBTQ community with sustaining her career at critical moments.

== Background ==
Cher's contralto voice has been acknowledged for its distinctiveness. Ann Powers of The New York Times described it as "a quintessential rock voice: impure, quirky [and] a fine vehicle for projecting personality". Her low timbre drew notice from the earliest stage of her career: many radio programmers rejected her 1964 debut single "Ringo, I Love You", mistaking her deep voice for a male vocal and assuming it was a gay man singing to the Beatles drummer Ringo Starr. On her first charting solo single "All I Really Want to Do", her voice dips so low on alternating lines that Atlantic Records president Ahmet Ertegun became convinced that Sonny Bono, her partner in the duo Sonny & Cher, was singing alongside her, which would have constituted a breach of contract.

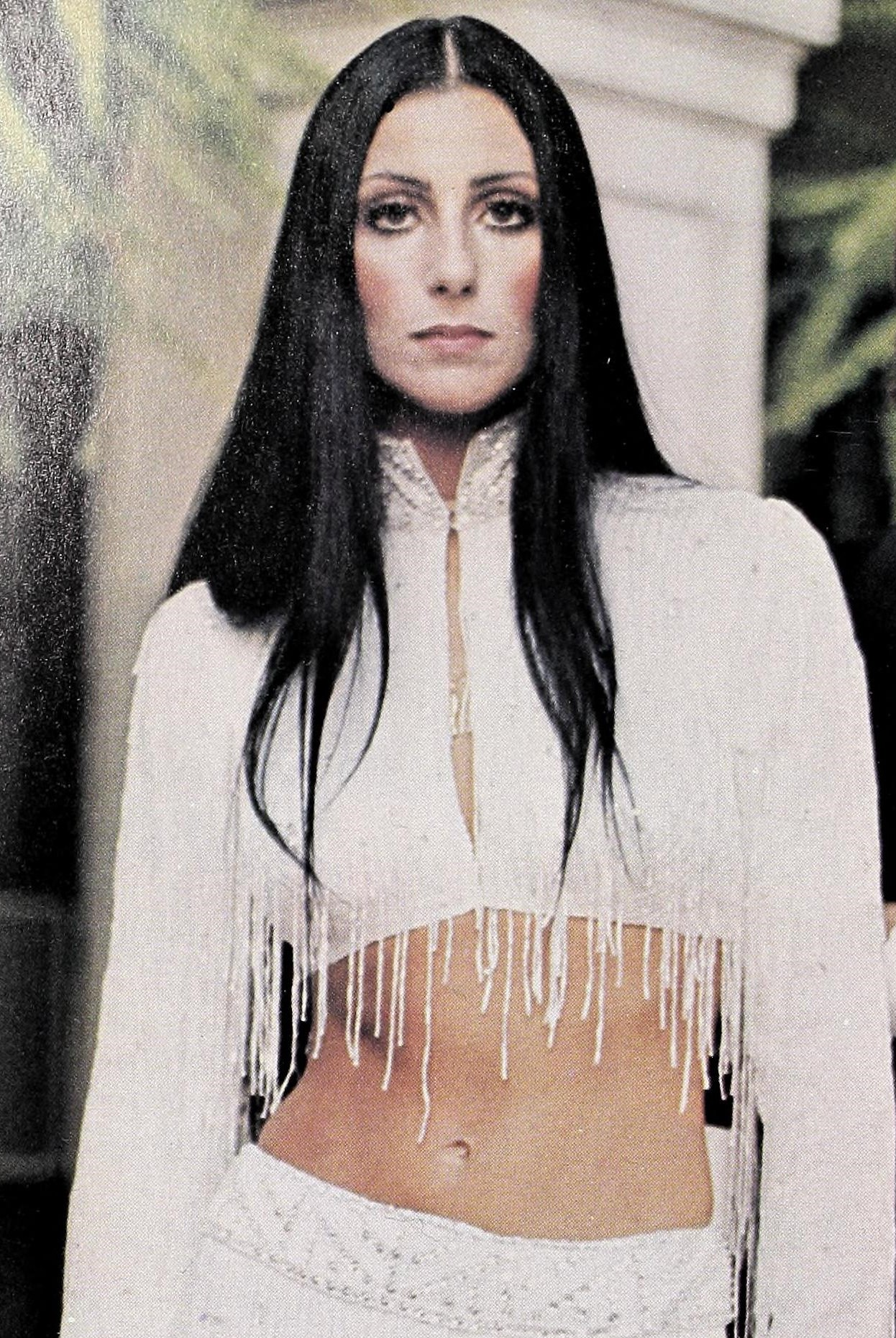
1972 publicity photo of Cher

According to AllMusic's Joe Viglione, Cher's 1972 single "The Way of Love" reads "either about a woman expressing her love for another woman or a woman saying au revoir to a gay male she loved", and her ability to carry both male and female ranges allowed her to sing solo in androgynous and gender-neutral songs. Billboard has credited Cher with establishing an "androgynous musical identity" that predated and influenced artists such as David Bowie and Patti Smith.

AllMusic's Bruce Eder noted that during her popular 1970s television shows with Sonny Bono, "he was a diminutive foil to Cher's sexually provocative comedienne", reversing traditional gender dynamics and positioning her as the comedic lead. In a 2018 interview, Cher recalled that her gay following began to coalesce after she and Sonny had divorced and reunited for a second variety show: "I don't think I was [a gay icon] when I was with Sonny. I think it happened on The Sonny and Cher Show [1976–1977], somehow."

Booth Moore of the Los Angeles Times wrote that Cher "understood that cultivating a look was as important as cultivating a sound" and described her as "the world's Barbie doll, a living fashion fantasy week after week on TV, who landed simultaneously on best—and worst—dressed lists". In 1972, after she was featured on the International Best Dressed Hall of Fame List, her longtime designer Bob Mackie stated: "There hasn't been a girl like Cher since [Marlene] Dietrich and [Greta] Garbo. She's a high-fashion star who appeals to people of all ages." Powers similarly placed Cher in the lineage of Mae West, describing her "sexy unpretentiousness" as "straight out of the Mae West handbook".

Cher's signature hairstyle—long, straight, jet-black hair parted in the center—was a 1970s fashion trend, and by the 1990s wigs had become a staple of her public appearances. Professor Katrin Horn from University of Greifswald wrote that Cher's use of wigs surpassed typical celebrity fashion, elevating her into "the realms of feminine drag".

== Queer readings of her work ==
=== Onstage ===
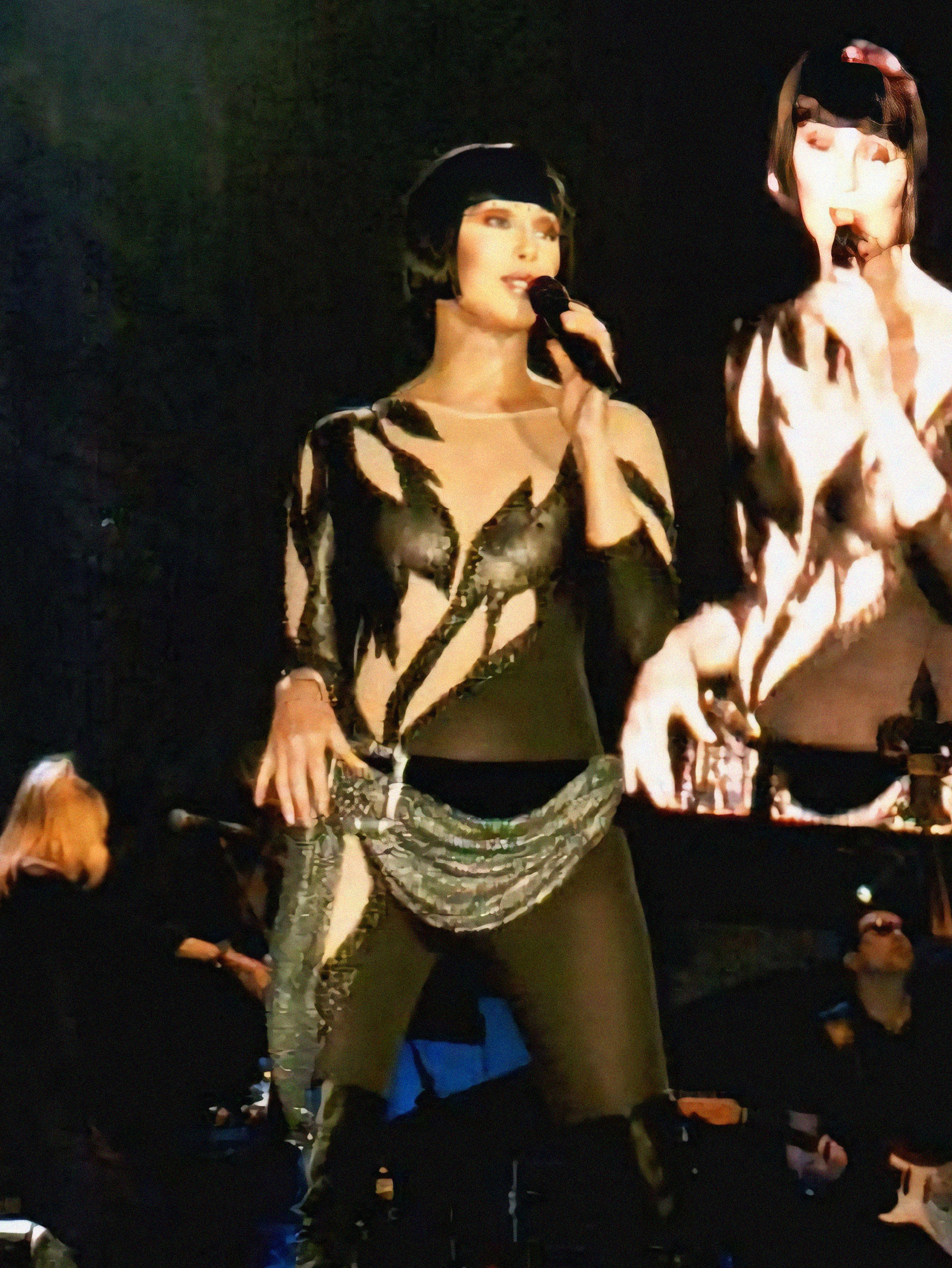
Cher performing on the Do You Believe? Tour in 1999

Maclean's journalist Elio Iannacci described Cher as "one of the first to bring drag to the masses", citing her Take Me Home Tour (1979–1982), which featured three drag queens impersonating Bette Midler, Diana Ross and Cher herself; audiences were often unaware they were impersonators until Cher introduced them out of drag at the end of the show.

One segment of Cher's Heart of Stone Tour (1989–1990) replaced female backup dancers with a male dancer impersonating Cher in a replica of the Bob Mackie outfit she had worn to the 58th Academy Awards in 1986; the real Cher then emerged in a different costume as the impersonator interacted with oversized props symbolizing fame and media attention. University College Dublin professor Diane Negra interpreted the segment as Cher casting herself as a "fictionalized production" shaped by media and performance, a dynamic she described as offering audiences a "pleasurable plurality".

During her Do You Believe? Tour (1999–2000), before performing "Walking in Memphis" live as its music video—in which she portrays Elvis Presley—played on screen, Cher quipped: "I want to warn you gay guys, don't fall in love with me because I am a really cute guy." University of Minho scholar Orquídea Cadilhe framed the moment through Marjorie Garber's theory of cross-dressing as gender deconstruction, in which clothing "constructs (and deconstructs) gender and gender differences".

On Living Proof: The Farewell Tour (2002–2005), Cher performed a remix of her 1979 single "Take Me Home" in which her shirtless male dancers, who had danced with women throughout the concert up to that point, paired off to grind against one another in homoerotic choreography. Music scholar Michael Trerotola found the choice of a disco song significant, as the genre had historically provided gay men with a space for community and intimacy.

=== On screen and record ===
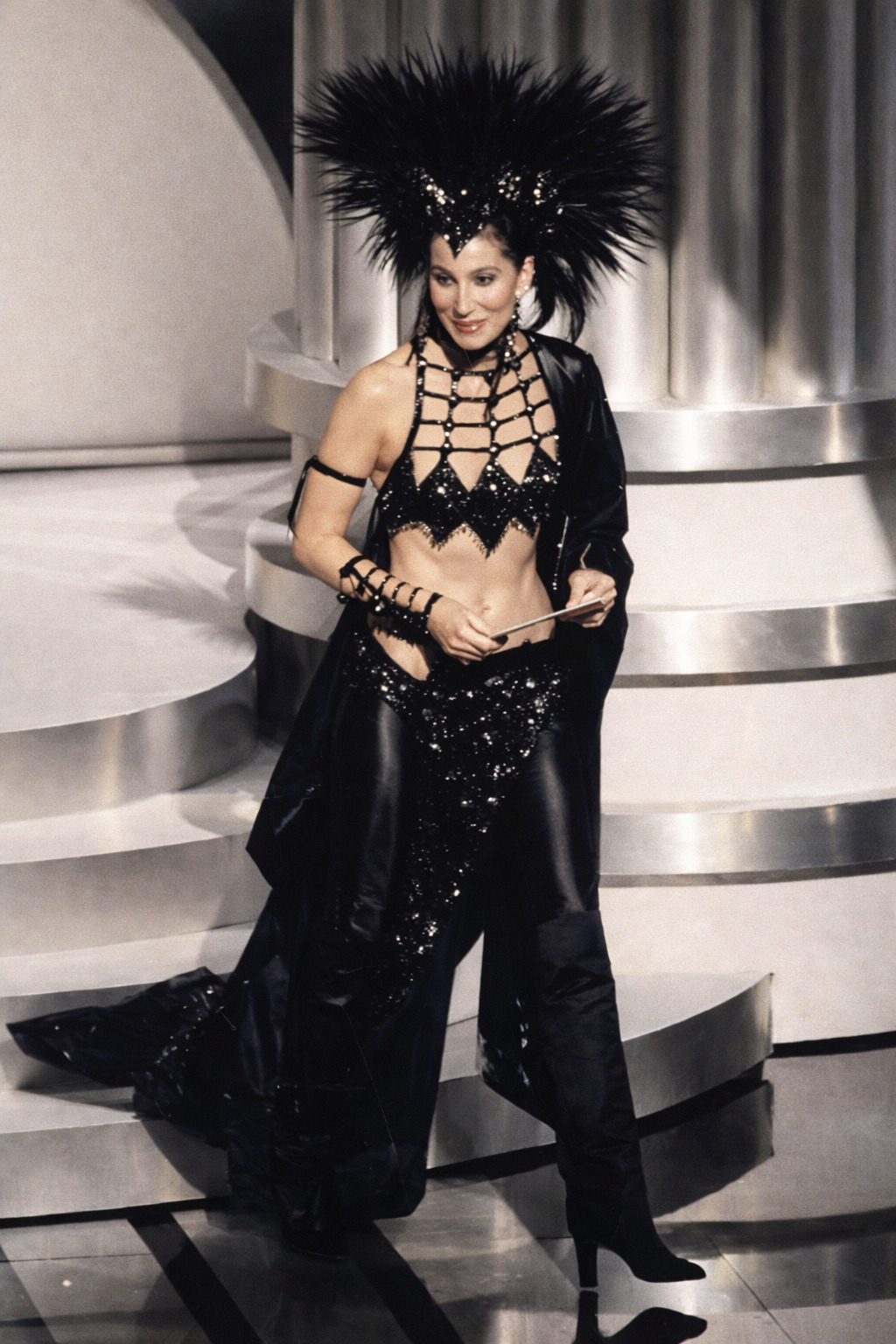
Cher at the 58th Academy Awards in 1986, wearing a Bob Mackie design

The Advocate's Jeff Yarbrough called Cher "one of the first superstars to 'play gay' with compassion and without a hint of stereotyping", as she portrays a lesbian in the 1983 film Silkwood. Professor Yvonne Tasker noted that Cher's film roles mirror her public image as a rebellious, sexually autonomous and self-made woman. She often portrays women who help marginalized male characters navigate mainstream society—including Eric Stoltz's character with craniodiaphyseal dysplasia in Mask (1985), Liam Neeson's mute homeless veteran in Suspect (1987) and Nicolas Cage's socially isolated baker with a wooden hand in Moonstruck (1987).

Frank DeCaro, in his book Disco: Music, Movies, and Mania Under the Mirror Ball, wrote that Cher's music video for "Hell on Wheels" (1979) is "a smorgasbord of camp deliciousness that includes drag queens, mustachioed truck drivers who look like seventies porn stars, and Cher in zebra-striped cut-to-there aerobics gear with matching skates". Her 1989 music video for "If I Could Turn Back Time" became the first to be banned by MTV. The controversy centered on her performance aboard the battleship USS Missouri, where she straddled a cannon in a leather thong that revealed her tattooed buttocks, accompanied by homoerotic imagery featuring sailors. Billboard later wrote that, while "it's impossible to put a finger on when Cher became a gay icon", the video "didn't hurt her reputation".

Many of Cher's songs are considered gay anthems, including "If I Could Turn Back Time", "Believe", "Strong Enough" and "Song for the Lonely". Writing for the Miami Herald in 1990, Ryan Murphy described "Half-Breed" and "Gypsys, Tramps & Thieves" as songs that, "as campy as they are, speak of a woman in search not of an identity—she has always had that—but acceptance". Powers described "Believe" (1998) as "perhaps the greatest disco song written after the alleged death of disco", while Pitchfork wrote that "coming from Cher—a confident, charismatic, and massively talented woman who'd been subjected to frequent public ridicule over her personal life", it gained "an extra survivalist edge". Murphy remarked that Gloria Gaynor's "I Will Survive"—itself among the most recognized gay anthems—"was the anthem [Cher] was born to sing". Writing for the Recording Academy on the 25th anniversary of "Believe", Jon O'Brien called it "the '90s answer to 'I Will Survive'".

University of Glasgow scholar Kay Dickinson argued that the Auto-Tune effect on "Believe"—which she and contemporary commentators identified as a vocoder—functions as a form of camp, describing it as resonant with "a certain delight in the inauthentic, in things which are obviously pretending to be what they are not". She characterized Cher as an "impostor" within a dance scene that would ordinarily exclude her for being "too mainstream and too old", whose defiance in the face of that exclusion echoed strategies of queer everyday life.

== Advocacy ==
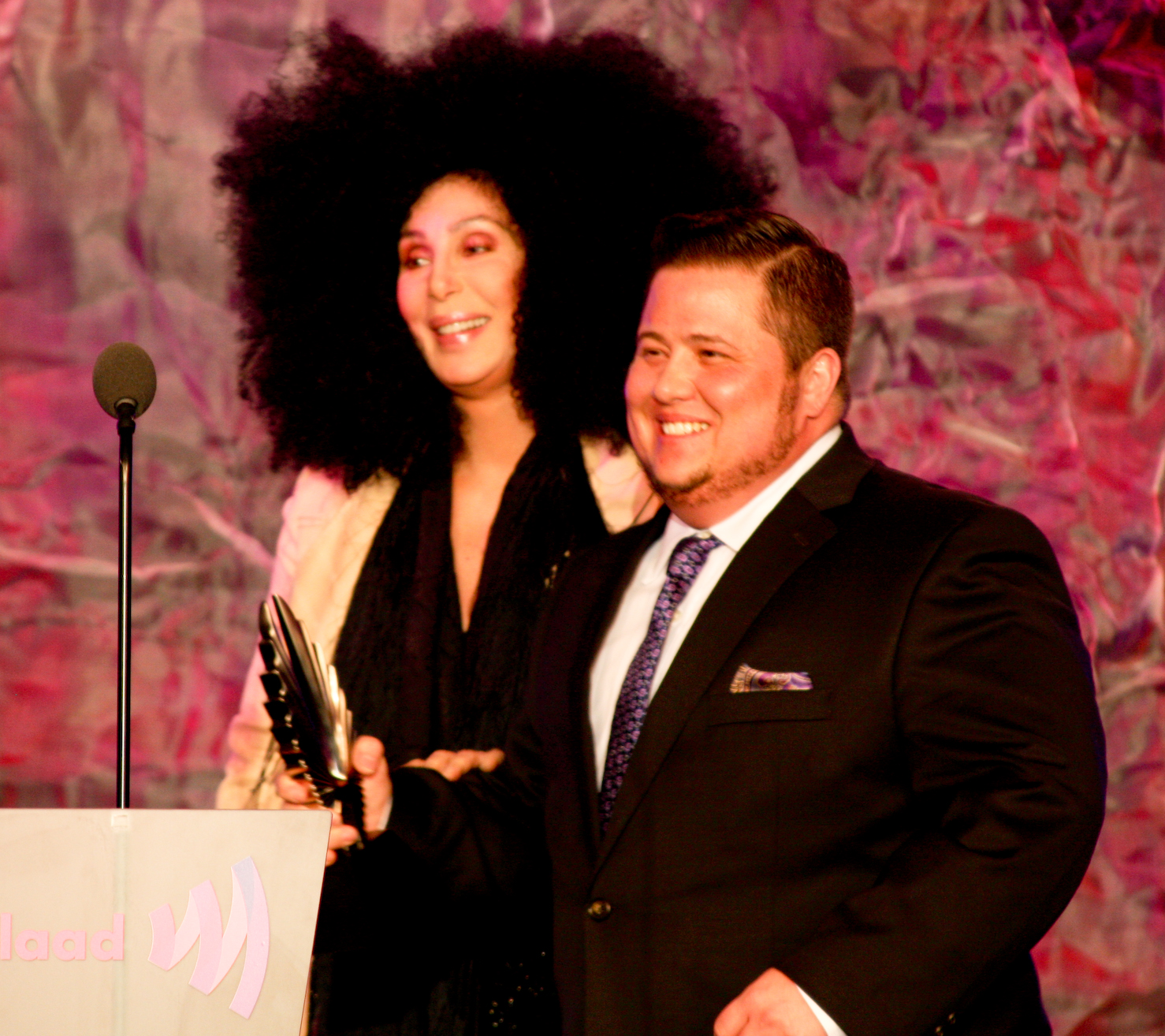
Cher presenting son Chaz Bono with the GLAAD Stephen F. Kolzak Award at the 2012 GLAAD Media Awards

Cher has been a vocal ally of the LGBTQ community since the 1980s, combining public advocacy with sustained philanthropic work on HIV/AIDS relief. The trajectory of that commitment was shaped by her son Chaz Bono, who came out as a lesbian at age 17. After initially grappling with "guilt, fear and pain", she concluded that LGBTQ people "didn't have the same rights as everyone else, [and she] thought that was unfair". In 1997, she delivered the keynote at the national Parents, Families, & Friends of Lesbians and Gays (PFLAG) convention, and in 1998 received the GLAAD Vanguard Award for having "made a significant difference in promoting equal rights for lesbians and gay men".

When Chaz later came out as a trans man, Cher faced a second adjustment; she has said she came to understand the experience by imagining its inverse: "If I woke up tomorrow and I was a guy, I would just lose my mind." Xtra Magazine reported that for many parents of trans children, Cher's willingness to speak publicly about the difficulty of the process helped normalize the emotional challenges parents face when a child transitions.

Cher's philanthropic work on HIV/AIDS relief dates to the early years of the epidemic, channeled primarily through partnerships with organizations such as the American Foundation for AIDS Research (amfAR) and the Cher Charitable Foundation. In 1987, amid the AIDS crisis in New York, Cher appeared in a New York State Department of Health poster urging the use of condoms, part of the "Don't Die of Embarrassment" campaign; Time included it among the 1980s AIDS posters that "raised awareness" during the epidemic.

In 1996, Cher hosted the amfAR Benefit alongside Elizabeth Taylor at the Cannes Film Festival. She is a donor, fundraiser and international spokesperson for Keep a Child Alive, which seeks to combat AIDS, including providing antiretroviral medicine to children and their families. In 2015, she received the amfAR Award of Inspiration for "her willingness and ability to use her fame for the greater good" and for being "one of the great champions in the fight against AIDS".

Cher has headlined major LGBTQ events, including the 2013 Dance on the Pier Pride benefit in New York—the event's first sellout in five years—and the 40th Sydney Gay and Lesbian Mardi Gras in 2018, whose tickets sold out within three hours of her teasing the performance on Twitter. She declined an invitation to perform at the 2014 Winter Olympics opening ceremony in Russia, citing the country's anti-LGBTQ legislation.

== In LGBTQ culture ==
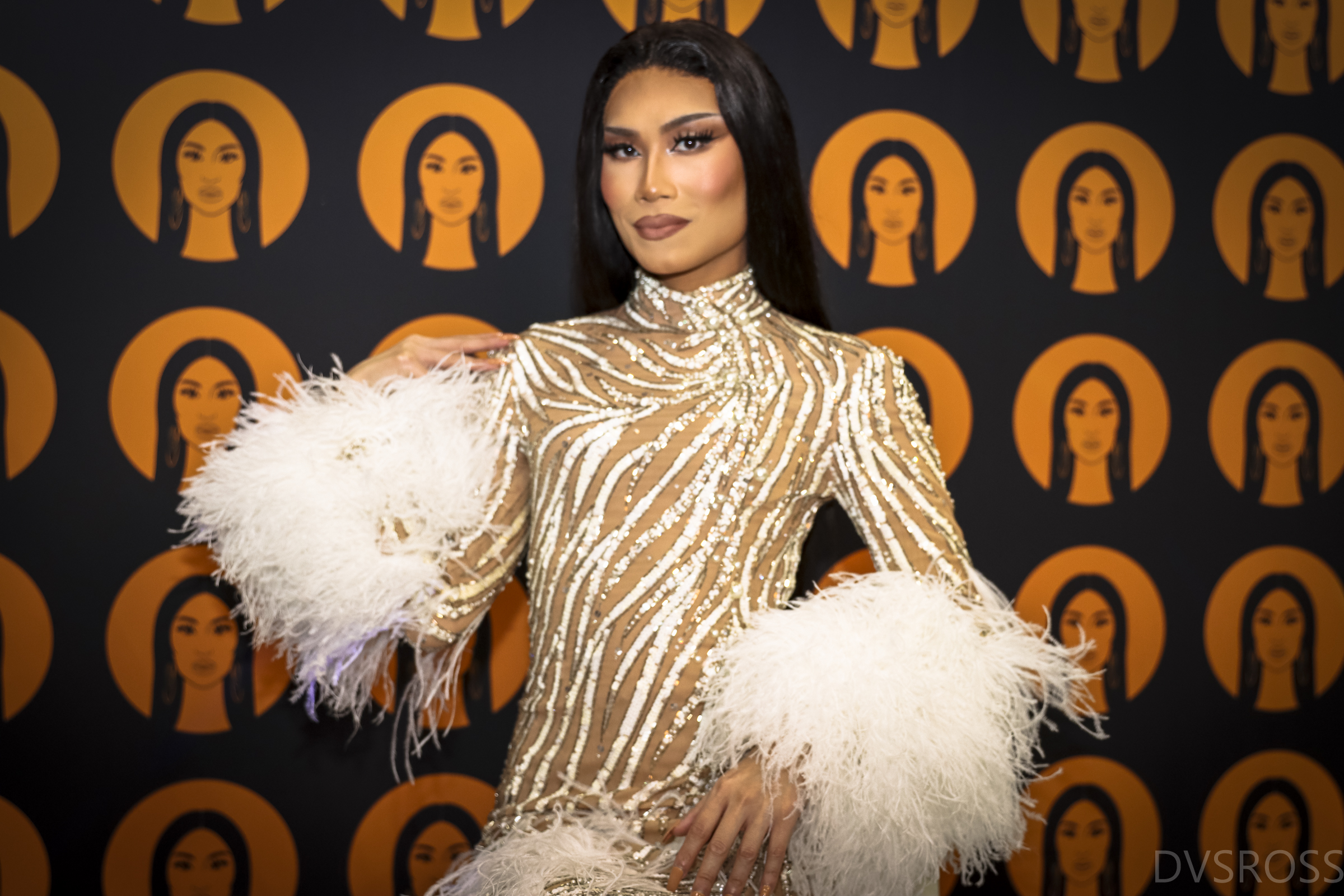
Drag performer Kahmora Hall impersonating 1970s Cher at RuPaul's DragCon LA, 2022

The LGBTQ community's reverence for Cher has been attributed to her unguarded defiance, outsider status, flamboyant image and longevity. Asked in a 1996 Rolling Stone interview why gay people liked her so much, Cher replied: "Because I'm cool." Alec Mapa of The Advocate described her appeal: "While the rest of us were sleeping, Cher's been out there for the last four decades living out every single one of our childhood fantasies ... Cher embodies an unapologetic freedom and fearlessness that some of us can only aspire to." Cher has also remarked, "I think the longer I look good, the better gay men feel."

Liza Minnelli has described Cher as a "bigger gay icon" than both herself and Barbra Streisand, defining a gay icon as "a person who is rooted for [and] cheered on by people who feel different". As Cher has put it, "Actors don't consider me an actor. Singers don't consider me a singer. And gay men consider me their best friend."

Cher's influence on LGBTQ culture is highlighted in the NBC sitcom Will & Grace, where she is frequently referenced as the idol of gay character Jack McFarland. She appears as herself in two episodes. In 2000's "Gypsies, Tramps and Weed"—the show's second-highest-rated episode—Jack mistakes the real Cher for a drag queen impersonating her. In 2002's "A.I.: Artificial Insemination", she appears as Jack's version of God.

Australian singer Troye Sivan named Cher among the straight women whose music made him "feel gay" growing up: "Cher, Madonna, Miley [Cyrus], Robyn, Lady Gaga. Those are my gay icons, which is a bit strange. I would have loved to have had more queer music growing up." A 1996 Dateline NBC interview clip featuring Cher's response to her mother's advice to "marry a rich man"—"Mom, I am a rich man"—went viral in 2016. When Taylor Swift referenced the quote in the music video for her 2019 pro-LGBTQ single "You Need to Calm Down", Bustle linked the citation to Cher's status as a gay icon and vocal advocate for the trans community, writing that "it would make sense that Swift would want to follow Cher's example".

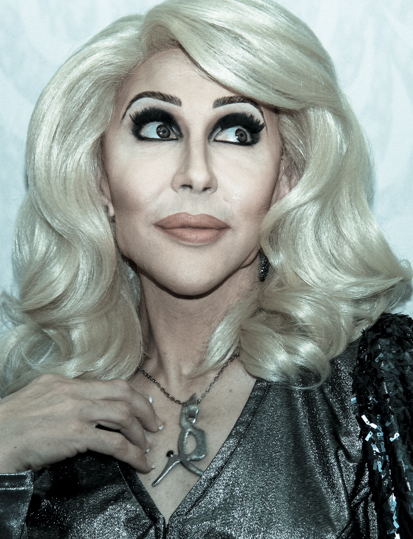
Professional Cher impersonator Chad Michaels at RuPaul's DragCon LA, 2018

Cher is frequently imitated by drag queens. According to Salon writer Thomas Rogers, drag queens emulate figures like Judy Garland, Dolly Parton and Cher because they "overcame insult and hardship on their path to success"—narratives that resonate with the struggles many gay men face when coming out. RuPaul has described Cher as a formative influence on his career: he learned to host live shows by watching her television specials, and the runway segment of The RuPaul Show (1996–1998) was, in his words, "lifted from The Cher Show." In a 1992 interview, before his mainstream breakthrough, RuPaul stated that he had been performing Cher impersonations since childhood: "I will not do a show without doing my Cher impersonation." In a 1995 New York feature on drag by Charles Busch, performer Misstress Formika named Cher among his childhood heroines—women who, alongside the Bionic Woman and Elvira, "used sex as a weapon".

The reality competition series RuPaul's Drag Race has honored Cher through challenges such as the musical performance "Cher: The Unauthorized Rusical" in season 10 and the runway theme "Everything Every-Cher All at Once" in season 16. Chad Michaels, a professional Cher impersonator, gained mainstream recognition on the show after winning the Snatch Game challenge in season 4 for his portrayal of Cher and later winning the first season of RuPaul's Drag Race All Stars. Fellow contestant Charlie Hides, also known for impersonating Cher, was described by Cher as her "favorite Cher impersonator".

Cher has credited the LGBTQ community with sustaining her career at critical moments. In a 2018 interview, she recalled that when the 1982 Broadway production of Come Back to the Five and Dime, Jimmy Dean, Jimmy Dean, in which she starred, lost its mainstream audience after initial negative reviews, "nobody came except the [LGBTQ] community... We managed to stay open until we could build back up the following." She also recalled that her late friend, makeup artist Kevyn Aucoin, had told her he loved listening to Cher records while growing up gay in Louisiana, and joked: "If you want to hide being gay, do not buy Cher records!"

The 1997 The X-Files episode "The Post-Modern Prometheus"—a rewriting of the 1818 novel Frankenstein by series creator Chris Carter—features a genetically engineered outcast who idolizes Cher for her role as a loving mother to a disfigured son in Mask (1985). Cadilhe argued that the creature's reverence mirrors the dynamic of Cher's fan base, in which marginalized groups—the LGBTQ community among them—find in her "the capacity to work as an agent empowering minorities". Cher has said of the LGBTQ community: "We're brothers and sisters. We're family." At a 2024 appearance at the Abbey in West Hollywood, she addressed her LGBTQ fans directly: "I've had really ups and downs in my career—I mean, really!—and you guys never left me. So thank you."

== See also ==
- Cultural impact of Cher
- Gay icon
- List of gay icons
