= Gay icon =

Public figure highly regarded and beloved by the LGBTQ community

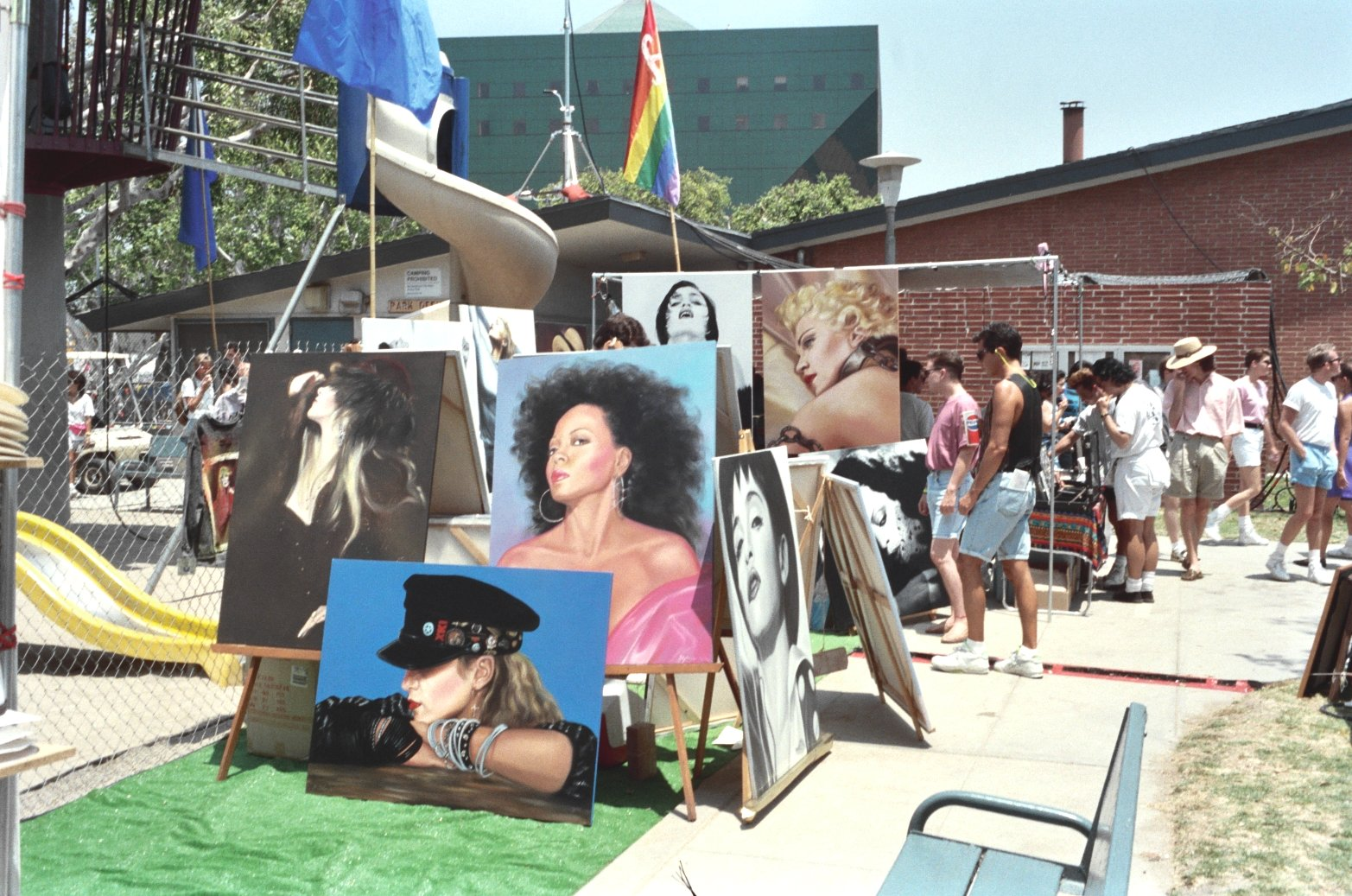
Booth at Los Angeles Pride featuring gay icons

A gay icon is a public figure who is regarded as a cultural icon by members of the LGBTQ community. Such figures usually have a devoted LGBTQ fanbase and act as allies to the LGBTQ community, often through their work, or they have been "openly appreciative of their gay fanbase". Many gay icons also have a camp aesthetic style, which is part of their appeal to LGBTQ individuals.

The most widely recognized gay icons tend to be actresses and singers who have garnered large LGBTQ fanbases, such as Judy Garland, Cher, Madonna, Whitney Houston, and Janet Jackson. However, the label can also be applied to individuals in politics, sports, literature, and other mediums, as well as historical figures deemed relatable to LGBTQ causes. Prominent entertainers considered to be gay icons often incorporate themes of acceptance, self-love, and sexuality in their work. Gay icons of all orientations within the LGBTQ community have acknowledged the role that their gay fans have played in their success.

== Variations and terminology ==
It has been argued that the gay icon label exists primarily for public figures held as cultural icons specifically by gay men. Other labels and variations include:

- Lesbian icon: A lesbian icon, also referred to as a dykon (a portmanteau of "dyke" and "icon"), is a figure that is regarded as an icon particularly by lesbians. The label has been applied to men such as James Dean and Marlon Brando for their influence on the butch aesthetic for lesbians, and has also been applied to various actresses who have played queer characters on film and television, such as Natasha Lyonne and Cate Blanchett.
- Queer icon: Historian Mark Nugent defines a queer icon as "a non-heterosexual representation that performs significant ideological work in either naturalizing or challenging popular constructs of the 'queer'."

Louis Staples writes that gay men often idolize women "whose legacies are punctuated with survival, exploitation, and tragedy".

== Satire ==
Some horror fiction characters (such as Ma, Annabelle, The Babadook, M3GAN, Pennywise the Clown and Chucky) have been hailed as gay icons through tongue-in-cheek internet memes in a satirical way.

== Responses ==
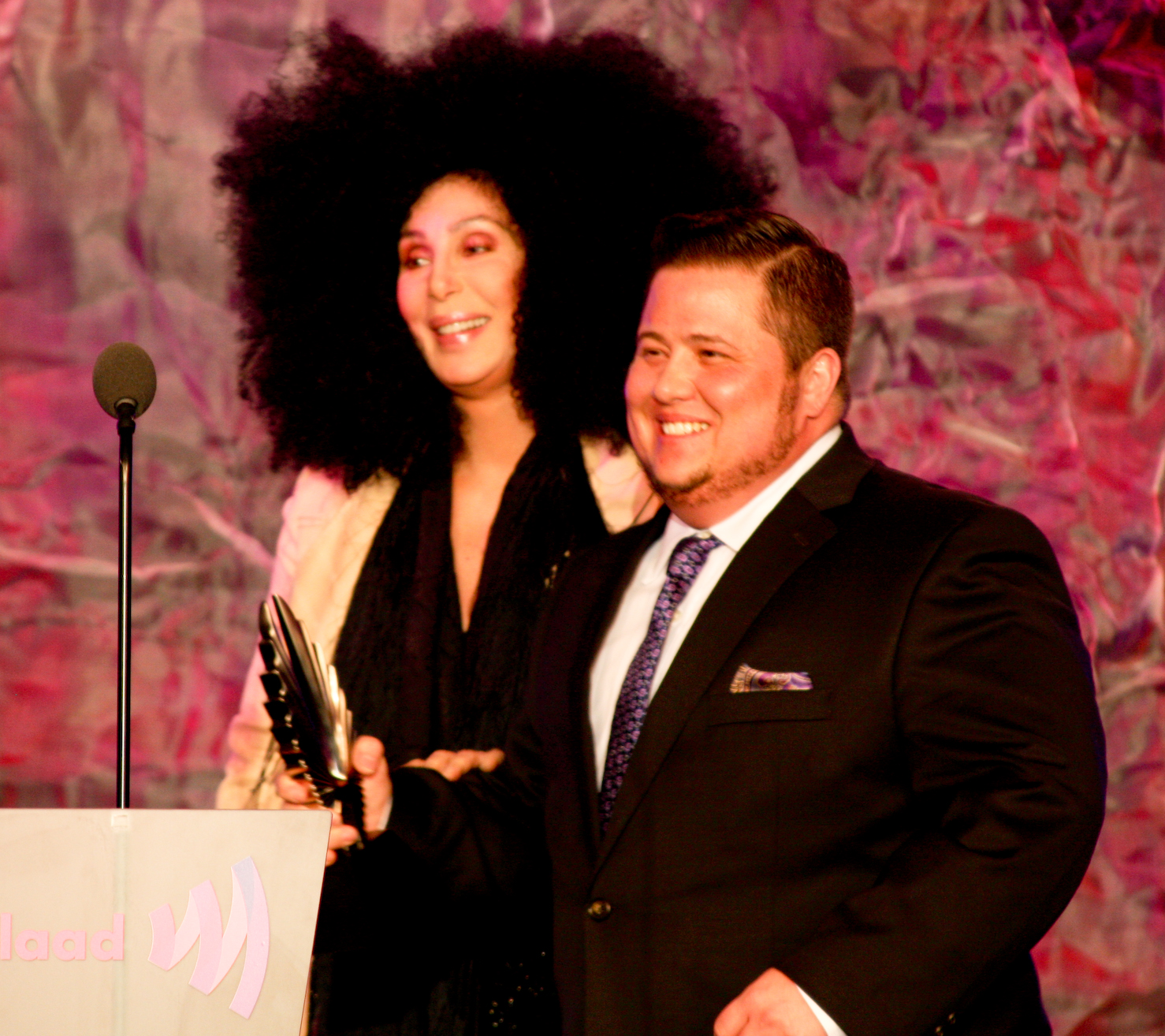
Cher presenting son Chaz Bono with the GLAAD Stephen F. Kolzak Award at the 2012 GLAAD Media Awards.

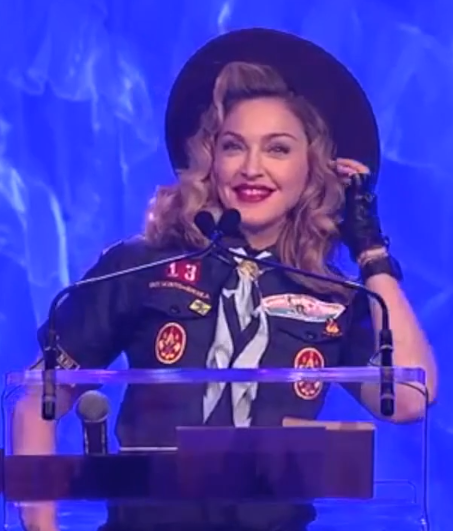
Madonna at the 24th GLAAD Media Awards in 2013, dressed as a Cub Scout in protest of the ban on homosexual Scouts and Scout leaders.

Many celebrities have responded positively to being regarded as gay icons, several noting the loyalty of their gay fans. Eartha Kitt, Cher and Madonna have credited gay fans with keeping them going at times when their careers had faltered.

Cher has described her relationship with the LGBTQ community as rooted in mutual loyalty. In a 2018 interview, she recalled that when the 1982 Broadway production of Come Back to the Five and Dime, Jimmy Dean, Jimmy Dean lost its mainstream audience after negative reviews, "nobody came except the [LGBTQ] community". Her 1983 portrayal of a lesbian in Silkwood was among the first non-stereotyped depictions by a mainstream star, and several of her songs—including "If I Could Turn Back Time" and "Believe"—are considered gay anthems. Her advocacy was shaped by the coming out and later gender transition of her son Chaz Bono; she received the GLAAD Vanguard Award in 1998 and the amfAR Award of Inspiration in 2015, and declined an invitation to perform at the 2014 Winter Olympics in Russia over the country's anti-LGBTQ legislation. She is frequently imitated by drag queens; RuPaul has cited her as a formative influence on his career. Liza Minnelli described Cher as a "bigger gay icon" than both herself and Barbra Streisand. At a 2024 appearance at the Abbey in West Hollywood, Cher told her LGBTQ fans: "I've had really ups and downs in my career—I mean, really!—and you guys never left me. So thank you."

Madonna has performed at several gay-related events and acknowledged the influence of her LGBT fan base: "I wouldn't have a career if it weren't for the gay community". Madonna has acknowledged and embraced her gay following throughout her career, even making several references to the gay community in her songs or performances, and performed at several gay clubs. She has declared in interviews that some of her best friends are gay and that she adores gay people and refers to herself as "the biggest gay icon of all times." She also has been quoted in television interviews in the early 1990s as declaring the "big problem in America at the time was homophobia."

In June 1999, Whitney Houston gave a surprise performance at the 13th Annual New York City Lesbian & Gay Pride Dance at one of the city's West Side piers. According to Instinct magazine, Houston's unannounced performance at the Piers "ushered in a new era that would eventually make high-profile artists performing at LGBTQ events virtually commonplace". Before hitting the stage, Houston was asked by MTV veejay John Norris why she decided to attend the event. Houston replied, "We're all God's children, honey". In May 2000, Houston made the cover of Out magazine.

Kylie Minogue has acknowledged the perception of herself as a gay icon and has performed at such events as the Sydney Gay and Lesbian Mardi Gras. Asked to explain the reason for her large gay fanbase, Minogue replied, "It's always difficult for me to give the definitive answer because I don't have it. My gay audience has been with me from the beginning ... they kind of adopted me." She noted that she differed from many gay icons who were seen as tragic figures, with the comment, "I've had a lot of tragic hairdos and outfits. I think that makes up for it!"

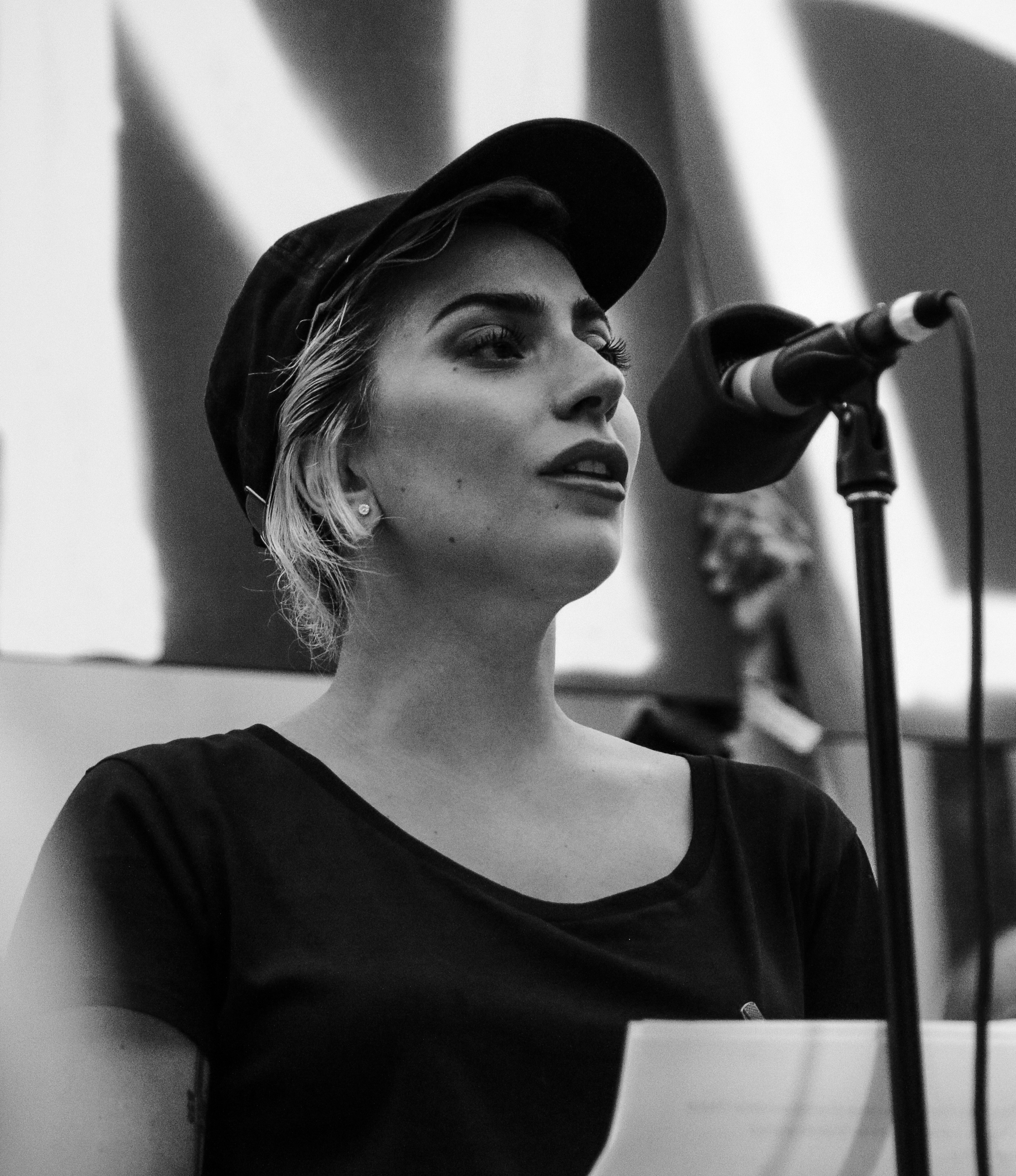
Lady Gaga at a vigil for the Pulse nightclub shooting in 2016

Lady Gaga has acknowledged and credited her gay following for launching then supporting her career stating, among other examples, "When I started in the mainstream it was the gays that lifted me up", and that "because of the gay community I'm where I am today." As a way to thank her gay audience for allowing her to perform her first album in gay clubs before she was invited to perform at straight ones, she often debuted her new albums at gay clubs. Along her career, she also dedicated a MuchMusic Video Award win, as well as her Alejandro music video, to gay people, frequently praised her gay entourage for the positive impact they had on her life and often gave a place to different queer crowds in her songs, performances, music videos as well as in the visuals of her make up line. Lady Gaga is known for her fights as an LGBT activist and attended numerous LGBT events such as Prides and Stonewall day.

Geri Halliwell has consistently acknowledged and accepted her status as a gay icon throughout her career as both a solo artist and member of the Spice Girls, describing a "kinship" with the gay community and her love and respect for her LGBTQ fans.

In August 2020, Lea Salonga responded to her gay icon tag, saying, "I'm not actually sure how I am." In the same interview, she continued, "Is it that I stand up for gay rights? Is it that I have siblings, cousins who are also members of the LGBT community?" She has also acknowledged the LGBTQ presence in musical theatre and stated that she has worked closely with members of the LGBT community for her entire career. In September 2022, after playing the role of a queer mom in Pretty Little Liars: Original Sin, she said that "if there is someone for whom this really resonates, and see these characters and go 'Oh my gosh, that's me, and I'm not treated as a joke,' it's great."

== See also ==
- List of gay icons
- Lists of LGBTQ people
- New Queer Cinema
- Queer art
- Straight ally
