= List of gay icons =

Notable gay, lesbian, and queer icons

This is a list of people and characters described or narrativized as gay icons by media.

== Historical figures ==
=== Sappho of Lesbos ===
Sappho of Lesbos was an Archaic Greek poet known for composing sentimental lyrics about women. Perceived homoerotism in her poems have led to her becoming a symbol for lesbianism, with her name and home island inspiring the terms sapphic and lesbian respectively. Her sexuality, and the themes in her poetry have been extensively discussed and reinterpreted by scholars.

=== Saint Sebastian ===
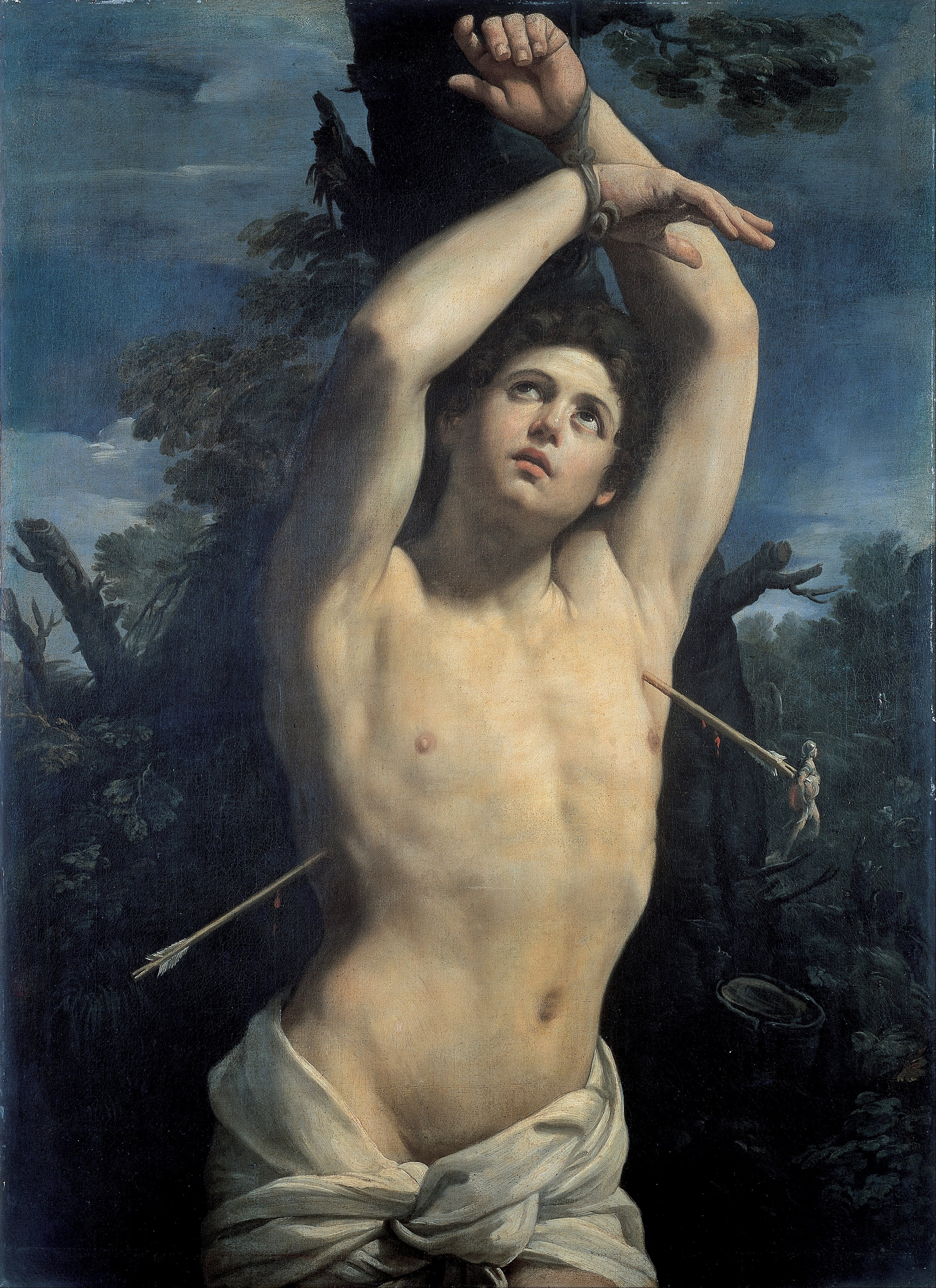
Saint Sebastian, regarded as a homo-erotic and gay icon

The 3rd century Christian martyr Saint Sebastian is one of the earliest known gay icons, due to his depiction in artwork as a beautiful, agonised young man. Historian Richard A. Kaye states that "Contemporary gay men have seen in Sebastian at once a stunning advertisement for homosexual desire (indeed, a homoerotic ideal), and a prototypical portrait of a tortured closet case."

In the 1890s, Irish poet Oscar Wilde, himself also called a gay icon, was incarcerated and exiled for his sexuality, and adopted the pseudonym "Sebastian Melmoth" after the saint. Gay playwright Tennessee Williams used the saint's name for the martyred character Sebastian in his 1957 play, Suddenly Last Summer.

=== Joan of Arc ===
The 15th century martyr and patron saint of France Joan of Arc has become a queer icon in more recent years due to her cross-dressing, devoted celibacy, and consistent rebuffing of male advances. She is consistently referenced in modern queer art and culture. She is particularly important to the transmasculine and lesbian communities. Jane Anderson described Joan of Arc as a queer icon and symbol for young women.

=== Marie Antoinette ===
Prior to the French Revolution, opponents of the French monarchy regularly circulated pornographic propaganda alleging that Marie Antoinette was engaged in lesbian relationships with the Princesse de Lamballe and the Duchesse de Polignac. While the rumors of Antoinette's sexuality were unfounded, they led to her being interpreted as an early lesbian icon in works by gay authors, such as Radclyffe Hall's The Well of Loneliness (1928) and Jean Genet's The Maids (1947).

== Other celebrities ==
=== Judy Garland ===
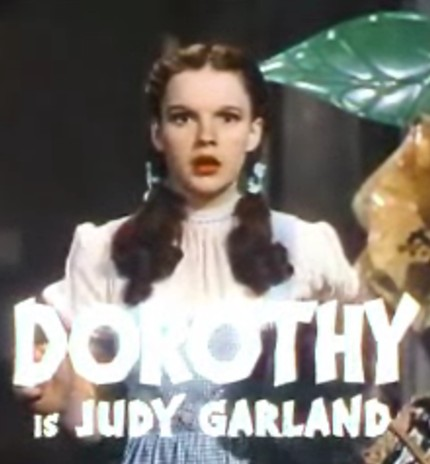
Judy Garland as Dorothy Gale in The Wizard of Oz (1939)

Late singer and actress Judy Garland was immensely popular among gay men due to her camp sensibilities, and is considered "the quintessential pre-Stonewall gay icon". In the 1950s, the phrase "friend of Dorothy" became used as a slang term for homosexuals. This term is attributed both to well-known author and fellow gay icon Dorothy Parker, and to Garland's prominent role as Dorothy Gale in The Wizard of Oz.

In discussing Judy Garland's camp appeal, gay film scholar Richard Dyer has defined camp as "a characteristically gay way of handling the values, images and products of the dominant culture through irony, exaggeration, trivialisation, theatricalisation and an ambivalent making fun of and out of the serious and respectable". Garland is camp, he asserts, because she is "imitable, her appearance and gestures copiable in drag acts". He calls her "ordinariness" in her early MGM films camp in their "failed seriousness" and her later style "wonderfully over-the-top".

=== Cher ===
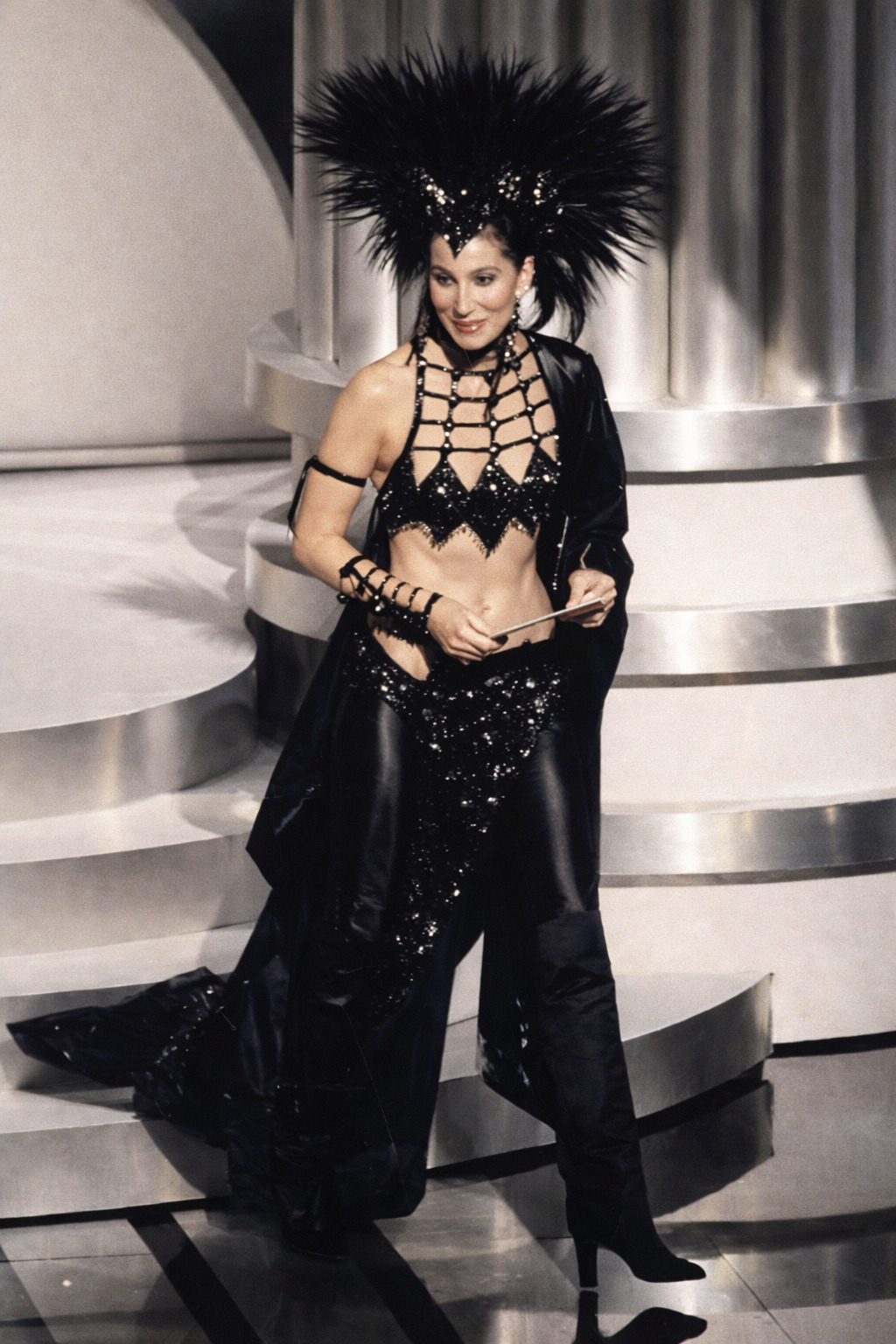
Cher at the 58th Academy Awards in 1986, wearing a Bob Mackie design

American singer-actress Cher is revered by the LGBTQ community, a status attributed to her career accomplishments, distinctive style and enduring longevity. Many of her songs are considered gay anthems, including "If I Could Turn Back Time", "Believe", "Strong Enough" and "Song for the Lonely". Maclean's journalist Elio Iannacci stated that Cher was "one of the first to bring drag to the masses", citing her Las Vegas residency in 1979, which featured three drag performers impersonating Bette Midler, Diana Ross and Cher herself. The Advocate's Jeff Yarbrough described Cher as "one of the first superstars to 'play gay' with compassion and without a hint of stereotyping", as she portrays a lesbian in the 1983 film Silkwood.

Cher's social activism has further solidified her status as a gay icon. Her eldest child, Chaz Bono, first came out as a lesbian at age 17, which led Cher to state that LGBTQ people "didn't have the same rights as everyone else, [and she] thought that was unfair". She was the keynote speaker for the 1997 national Parents, Families, & Friends of Lesbians and Gays (PFLAG) convention, and received the GLAAD Vanguard Award in 1998 for having "made a significant difference in promoting equal rights for lesbians and gay men". On June 11, 2009, Chaz came out as a transgender man, and his transition from female to male was legally finalized on May 6, 2010. As the mother of a trans man, Cher has continued to advocate for visibility and support for trans families.

Cher's standing in LGBTQ culture is also reflected in popular media. In the NBC sitcom Will & Grace, she was the idol of gay character Jack McFarland. Within the drag community, RuPaul has cited Cher as a formative influence on his career, stating that he learned to host live shows by watching her television specials and that the runway segment of The RuPaul Show was "lifted from The Cher Show". The reality competition series RuPaul's Drag Race has honored her through recurring challenges and runway themes across multiple seasons. Chad Michaels, a professional Cher impersonator, became known beyond the drag scene through his portrayal of Cher in the Snatch Game challenge and won the first season of RuPaul's Drag Race All Stars. At a 2024 appearance at the Abbey in West Hollywood, Cher told her LGBTQ fans: "I've had really ups and downs in my career—I mean, really!—and you guys never left me. So thank you."

=== Madonna ===
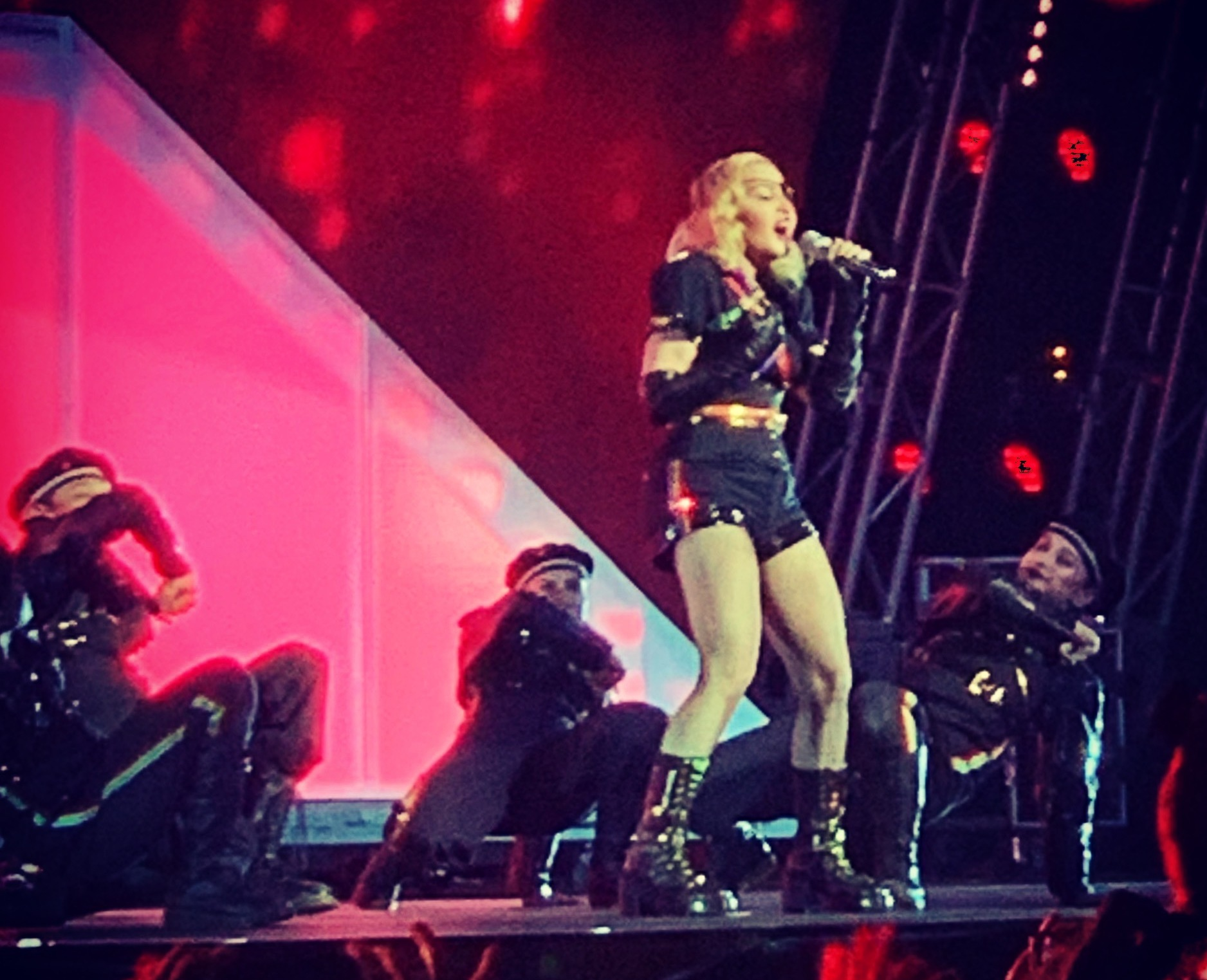
Madonna celebrating Stonewall 50 – WorldPride NYC 2019

Pop musician Madonna has become a preeminent gay icon. The Advocate's Steve Gdula commented that "back in the 1980s and even the early 1990s, the release of a new Madonna video or single was akin to a national holiday, at least among her gay fans." Gdula also stated that during this period, concurrent with the rise of the AIDS epidemic, "when other artists tried to distance themselves from the very audience that helped their stars to rise, Madonna only turned the light back on her gay fans and made it burn all the brighter."

Madonna credited various influences for both her life and career. A portrait of Lee Miller kissing another woman by Man Ray that she owns, inspired her and encouraged the use of lesbian imagery of her career, according to art critic John Walker. Madonna cited David Bowie as a foundational influence, declaring after attending her first-ever concert at age 15, to be "so inspired by the way he played with gender confusion. Was both masculine and feminine". In 2016, after Bowie's death, she dedicated a redention of his "Rebel Rebel" song during her Rebel Heart Tour, stating: "He showed me that it was OK to be different. And he's the first Rebel Heart that I laid eyes on ... Talented. Unique. Genius. Game Changer. The Man who Fell to Earth". After David Collins' death, Madonna penned a letter describing his influence on her life.

=== Whitney Houston ===
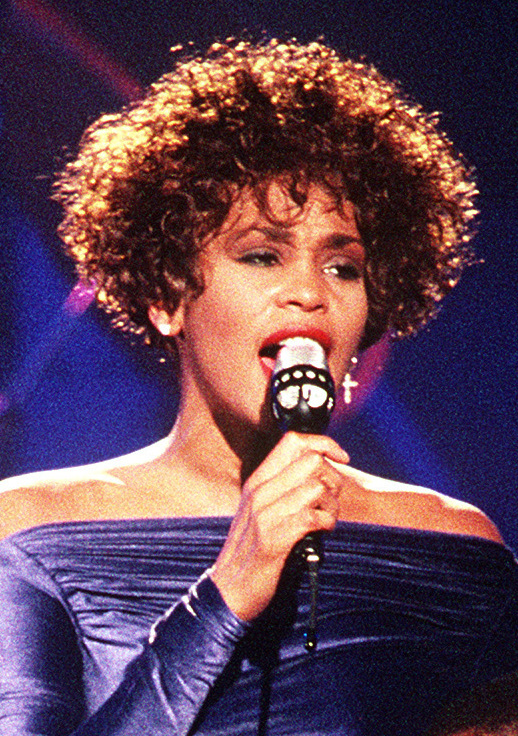
Entertainer Whitney Houston in 1991

During Whitney Houston's early fame, rumors speculated of a romance between Houston and Robyn Crawford, which both denied during a Time magazine interview in 1987. In 2019, Crawford admitted in her memoirs, A Song for You: My Life with Whitney Houston, that their early relationship included sexual activity but stopped before Houston signed a recording deal.

In addition, Houston became an activist for the fight against HIV and AIDS during the first decade of the AIDS epidemic. The Whitney Houston Foundation for Children, in particular, focused on helping children who suffered from HIV/AIDS, among other issues. In 1990, Whitney took part in Arista Records' 15th anniversary gala, which was an AIDS benefit. A year later, Whitney participated in the Reach Out & Touch Someone AIDS vigil at London in September 1991 while she was finishing her historic ten-date residency at London's Wembley Arena; there, she stressed the importance of AIDS research and addressing HIV stigma.

During the middle of her tour to promote the My Love Is Your Love album in June 1999, Whitney gave a surprise performance at the 13th Annual New York City Lesbian & Gay Pride Dance, titled Dance 13: The Last Dance of the Century. According to Instinct magazine, Houston's unannounced performance at the Piers "ushered in a new era that would eventually make high-profile artists performing at LGBTQ events virtually commonplace."

Houston has been celebrated among LGBTQ+ fans for her closeted queer identity that has been explored in documentaries.

=== Britney Spears ===
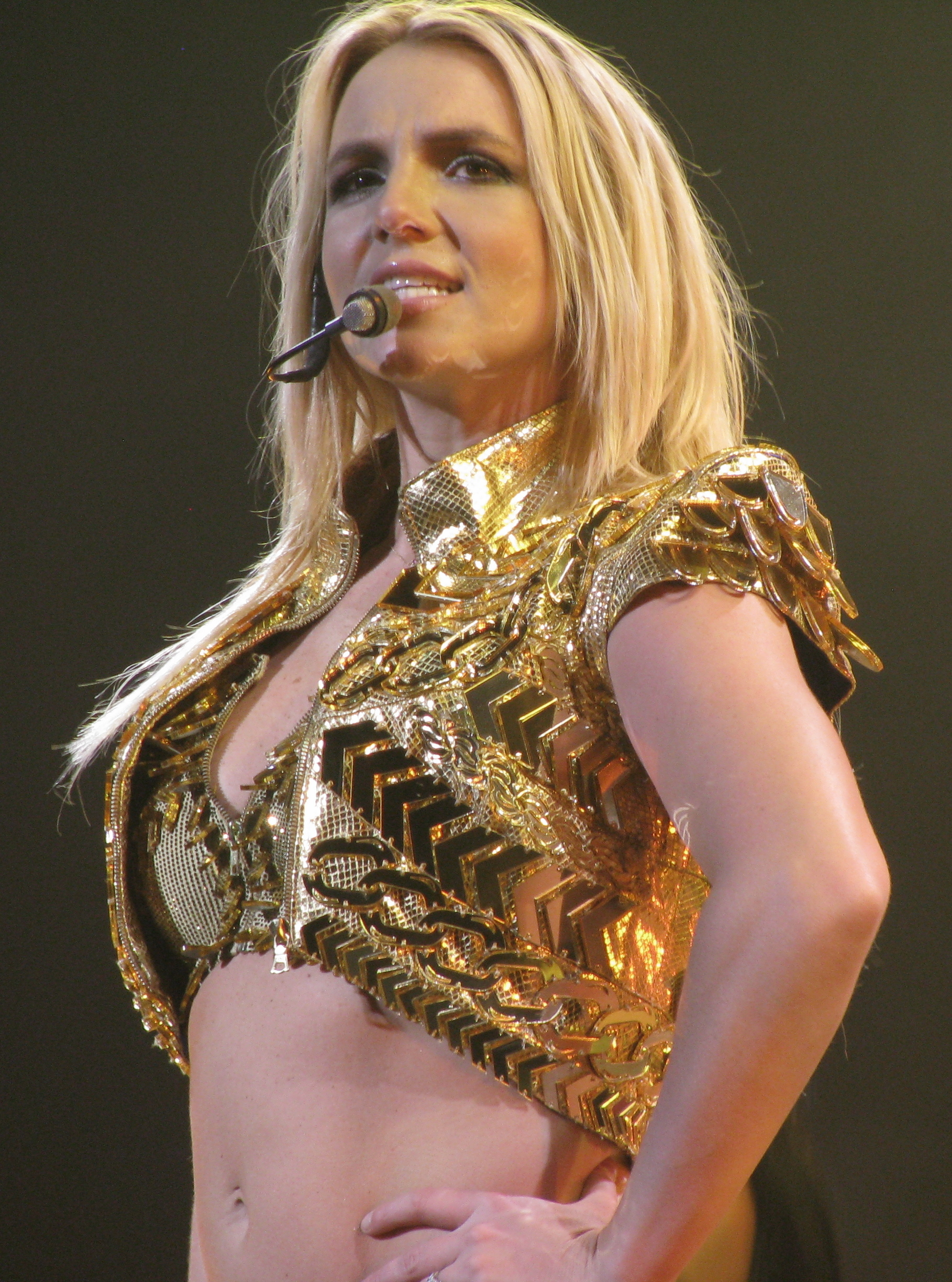
Britney Spears in 2011 during the Femme Fatale tour

Britney Spears has been recognized as a gay icon by the public and by academics. Hits like "...Baby One More Time" and "Toxic" have been embraced as anthems within gay culture. Her performances, notably kissing Madonna at the 2003 MTV Video Music Awards, are celebrated as iconic moments in queer pop history. Throughout her career, Spears has been acknowledged for her support of the LGBTQ community. This support has included opposition to anti-gay and anti-trans legislation, raising funds for The Trevor Project, and participating in benefits for the victims of the Pulse nightclub shooting. She received the GLAAD Vanguard Award in 2018.

Spears has expressed gratitude and support for her LGBTQ fans. In her memoir “The Woman In Me,” Spears describes her relationship with the LGBTQ+ community as one of unconditional love, noting how she has both been supported by and served as a refuge for queer fans:

My gay friends were always protective of me, maybe because they knew I was that kind of innocent, not dumb, but way too kind. And I think a lot of the gay guys around me took on a supportive role. I could even feel it onstage when they were beside me. If I thought I didn’t do my best performance, I could count on my friends to realise I didn’t feel great about it and still say, “You did so good!” That kind of love means everything to me.

She also writes about her most cherished experiences occurring in gay clubs, describing them as places where she felt truly welcomed and uplifted by the community’s exuberance and acceptance.

The LGBTQ community was an important part of the Free Britney movement. LGBTQ fans empathized with loss of control; the movement echoed a broader struggle for queer liberation.

=== Kate Bush ===
Kate Bush has been cited as an influence by respected artists like Elton John, who is openly gay and credits Bush's music with helping him to overcome his alcoholism. Fellow gay icon Cher has also expressed admiration of Bush's work. Her debut single "Wuthering Heights" topped the charts and became a global success. The music video for the song in which she dances in the moors in a red dress has become iconic among the LGBTQ community. One of her less influential albums, Lionheart (1978), featured a song titled "Kashka From Baghdad", which regaled to the listener the tale of a gay couple living together in sin, which was quite revolutionary for its time. Since 2016, Kate Bush fans have gathered in locations all over the world and taken to recreate Bush's "Wuthering Heights" video in an event dubbed The Most Wuthering Heights Day Ever. People in attendance to the event don red dresses or red in general and recreate the choreography observed in the video as a tribute. Bush, who has seen a clip of one of the events, described the tribute by her fans as "very touching and sweet".

=== Kylie Minogue ===
Kylie Minogue, known for her disco-infused dance music and camp style, is held in high esteem by her gay fans. She remarks that her gay fans have been with her 'through thick and thin', yet was never specifically marketed to a gay audience early in her career. Singer-songwriter Rufus Wainwright, who is openly gay, described Minogue as "the gay shorthand for joy". She has performed at the Sydney Gay and Lesbian Mardi Gras Party in 1994, 1998 and 2012, Palm Springs White Party in 2018, WorldPride 2019 in New York City and headlined the opening ceremony concert at WorldPride 2023 in Sydney.

Minogue encourages her gay icon status with comments including "I am not a traditional gay icon. There's been no tragedy in my life, only tragic outfits" and "My gay audience has been with me from the beginning ... they kind of adopted me." Her status as a gay icon has been attributed to her music, fashion sense and career longevity. Author Constantine Chatzipapatheodoridis wrote about Minogue's appeal to gay men in Strike a Pose, Forever: The Legacy of Vogue... and observed that she "frequently incorporates camp-inflected themes in her extravaganzas, drawing mainly from the disco scene, the S/M culture, and the burlesque stage." In Beautiful Things in Popular Culture (2007), Marc Brennan stated that Minogue's work "provides a gorgeous form of escapism". Minogue has explained that she first became aware of her gay audience in 1988, when several drag queens performed to her music at a Sydney pub, and she later saw a similar show in Melbourne. She said that she felt "very touched" to have such an "appreciative crowd", and this encouraged her to perform at gay venues throughout the world, as well as headlining the 1994 Sydney Gay and Lesbian Mardi Gras. Minogue has one of the largest gay followings in the world.

=== Mariah Carey ===
Mariah Carey has demonstrated allyship since the early beginnings of her career. She has shown her love for her LGBTQ+ fans numerous times, including a 2003 performance at G-A-Y in London, as well as headlining Los Angeles Pride in 2023 and Brighton Pride in 2025. Furthermore, Carey also won a GLAAD award for Allyship.

=== The Golden Girls ===
Bea Arthur, Betty White, Rue McClanahan, and Estelle Getty - the four main stars of The Golden Girls - each had a long and rich history of working with and for LGBTQ causes and each was an outspoken supporter whenever asked in interviews. The show itself also featured a number of gay-centric episodes, each portraying the queer character with kindness and compassion. The majority of these episodes were almost never made due to hesitation on the part of the network, NBC, to produce episodes focusing on homosexuality, with the four actresses often fighting the network to see them produced.

Bea Arthur had previously worked on her own television show, Maude which featured multiple gay-themed episodes. After her death in 2009, Arthur bequeathed $300,000 to the Ali Forney Center, a New York City organization that provides housing for homeless LGBTQ+ youths.

Meanwhile, as a supporter and advocate of LGBTQ rights, Betty White said in 2010, "If a couple has been together all that time – and there are gay relationships that are more solid than some heterosexual ones – I think it's fine if they want to get married. I don't know how people can get so anti-something. Mind your own business, take care of your affairs, and don't worry about other people so much." In a 2011 interview, she revealed that she always knew her close friend Liberace was gay and that she sometimes accompanied him to premieres to help him hide it.

Rue McClanahan was also a supporter of gay rights, including advocating for same-sex marriage in the United States. In January 2009, she appeared in the star-studded Defying Inequality: The Broadway Concert—A Celebrity Benefit for Equal Rights.

Estelle Getty was said by friends Harvey Fierstein and Rosie O'Donnell, both notable members of the LGBTQ community, to have been heavily involved in HIV/AIDS activism and had lost close friends and family to the disease, among them her nephew Steven Scher (1962–1992), whom she cared for after he was diagnosed with HIV/AIDS, and her Torch Song Trilogy co-star Court Miller (1952–1986). She later helped to open a hospice for AIDS patients in Greensboro, North Carolina, her nephew's hometown, in 1996, called Beacon Place, which was still in operation as of 2023.

=== Janet Jackson ===
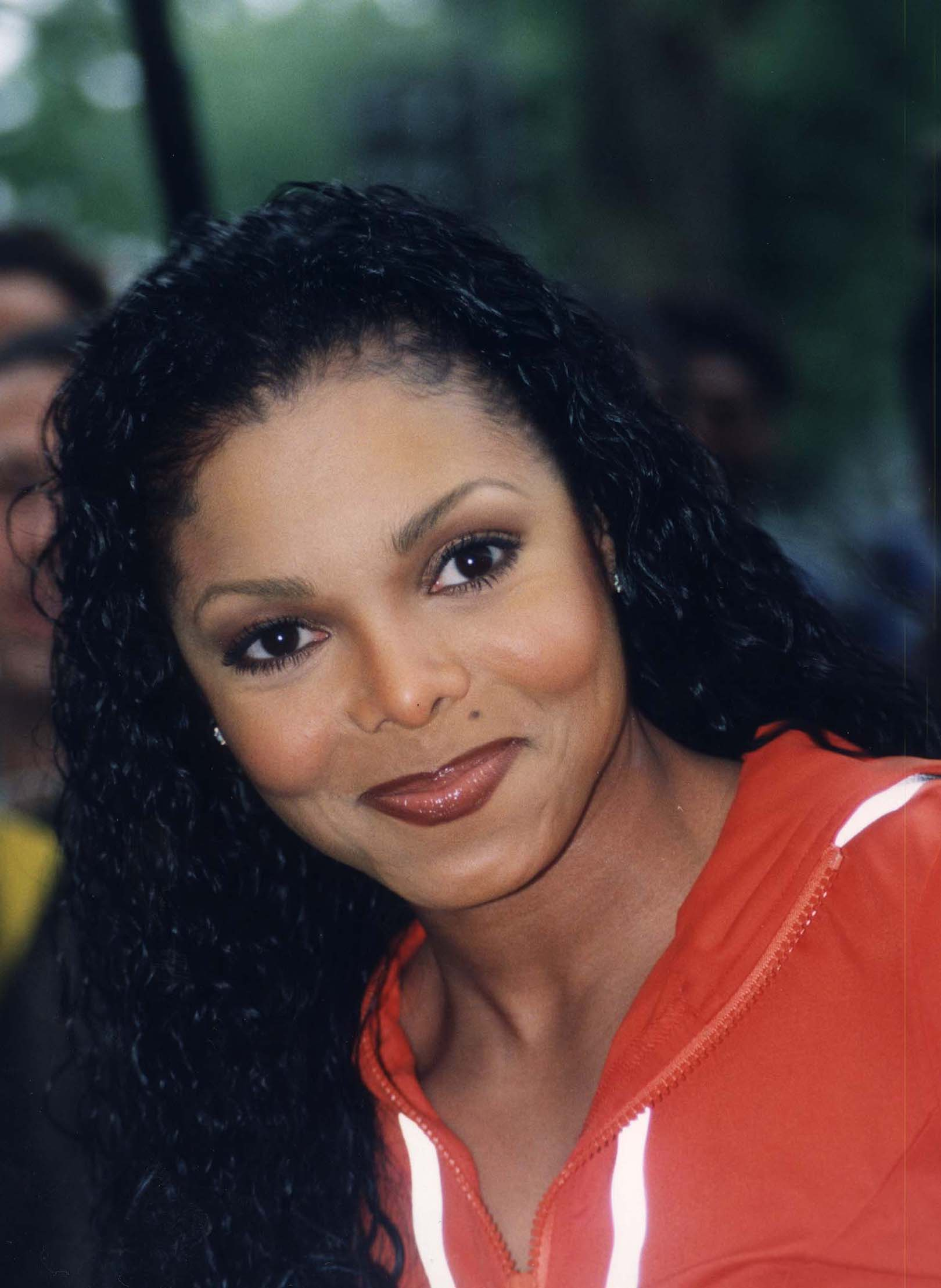
Janet Jackson, 1998

Janet Jackson garnered a substantial LGBTQ following during the 1990s with her sixth studio album The Velvet Rope (1997). The album was honored by the National Black Lesbian and Gay Leadership Forum and received the award for Outstanding Music Album at the 9th Annual GLAAD Media Awards in 1998 for its songs that dealt with sexual orientation and homophobia. On 26 April 2008, she received the Vanguard Award—a media award from the Gay & Lesbian Alliance Against Defamation—to honor her work in the entertainment industry in promoting equality for LGBTQ people.

GLAAD President Neil G. Giuliano commented, "Ms. Jackson has a tremendous following inside the LGBT community and out, and having her stand with us against the defamation that LGBT people still face in our country is extremely significant."

=== Christina Aguilera ===
Christina Aguilera has been recognized as a gay icon. She became known for incorporating themes such as feminism, sexuality, LGBTQ culture and the sex-positive movement into her work. Her 2002 song "Beautiful" has been called an anthem for the LGBTQ community, with UK LGBTQ rights charity Stonewall naming it the most empowering song of the decade for lesbian, gay and bisexual people and for having "inspired millions of young people around the world". In the video for "Beautiful" (2002), the highlight scene of a gay kiss has been considered an important moment for LGBTQ culture.

Aguilera was lauded for calling out myths around HIV/AIDS, in addition to raising awareness about the virus and raising funds for the Mac AIDS Fund and the Elton John AIDS Foundation. In 2008, she advocated for same-sex marriage and spoke out against Proposition 8. In June 2016, Aguilera release single "Change", which was aimed to raise proceeds to the victim's families and survivors of the Orlando nightclub shooting. During The X Tour (2019), Aguilera visited Russia and "blessed" a gay marriage proposal in the backstage, contrary to the country's laws against "gay propaganda".

In 2019, she was awarded by the Human Rights Campaign for using her "platform to share a message of hope and inspiration to those who have been marginalized ... bringing greater visibility to the LGBTQ community". In 2023, Aguilera was honored for her LGBTQ allyship and for advocating for the queer community at the Stonewall National Monument.

=== Lady Gaga ===
Lady Gaga, who herself is bisexual, fought as an LGBTQ rights activist from the beginning of her career and has a large LGBTQ following. She has fought against LGBT-related phobia and fought for marriage and adoption equality, the repeal of the Don't Ask Don't Tell law, and the protection of transgender people.

=== Diana, Princess of Wales ===
Highly regarded by the LGBTQ community due to her work with gay men suffering from AIDS, Diana, Princess of Wales, is considered to be a gay icon. The hardships she faced during her life within the British royal family and her struggles with bulimia have been cited as factors to which members of the LGBTQ community can mostly connect. Writing for Them, David Levesley described Diana as "a symbol of the familial oppression many queer people know all too well," and added that "[queer people] admire her for how long she lasted in the face of a shitty situation. Is there anything more queer than a fabulous woman trapped in a bleak household?" James Greig from Vice also held a similar viewpoint, stating that "her status as a tragic diva aside, it's undeniable that Diana made real, material changes to the lives of LGBT people – particularly through the work she did around AIDS." In an article for Newsweek, Desmond O'Connor wrote that Diana's work with dying HIV+ gay men was crucial for reminding "the people of Great Britain that their 'untouchable' sons deserved to be loved."

In 2009, a panel including Sir Ian McKellen and Alan Hollinghurst chose Diana's portrait to be shown in the Gay Icons exhibition at the National Portrait Gallery, London. In October 2017, the Attitude magazine honoured Diana with its Legacy Award for her HIV/AIDS work. Prince Harry accepted the award on behalf of his mother.

=== Elton John ===
Sir Elton Hercules John, famously known as Elton John, is perhaps one of the most famous, publicly queer musicians of all time. During 1976, he announced publicly that he was bisexual and remained open about his sexuality to present day, happily married to his husband David Furnish since 2014. Aside from his musical career, he is also the founder of the Elton John AIDS Foundation which was created to give support and aid to those in need as well as to "prevent infections, fight stigma and provide treatment with love, compassion and dignity for the most vulnerable groups affected by HIV around the world".

=== Lea Salonga ===
In 2011, The Advocate called Lea Salonga a "major gay icon" for being "very vocal in her support for LGBT equality, both here [the U.S.] and in her native Philippines."

The song "Reflection," which she sang in Disney's Mulan (1998), has become viewed as an anthem for queer audiences. On October 12, 2009, during a benefit concert for victims of Typhoon Ondoy, Salonga referenced the National Equality March in Washington, D.C., and firmly stated, "I believe that every single human being has the fundamental right to marry whoever they want." In February 2016, Salonga publicly criticized Filipino politician and former professional boxer Manny Pacquiao for his views on homosexuality and same-sex marriage. Over the course of decades, Salonga has spoken and performed at several fundraising events for HIV/AIDS.

== Fictional characters ==
=== Wolverine ===
Although Wolverine has primarily been depicted as straight in mainstream Marvel continuity, his relationships with male characters like Cyclops and Nightcrawler have been highlighted for homoerotic elements. An alternate version of Wolverine featured in X-Treme X-Men (2012 – 2013) was depicted as gay and in a relationship with Hercules, two characters sharing an on-panel kiss in issue #10. The character has proven popular with queer fans, and has been described as a gay icon.

=== He-Man ===
Since his creation, He-Man's homoeroticism, implied homosexuality, and adherence to multiple gay stereotypes has resulted in the character and show drawing a queer audience when the cartoon first aired, with the character being viewed as a gay icon.

=== Xena: Warrior Princess ===
Xena has enjoyed a particular cult status in the lesbian community. Some of the lesbian fan base see Xena and Gabrielle as a couple and have embraced them as role models and lesbian icons. Xena's popularity was successfully utilized by Subaru when trying to establish a healthy base of lesbian customers: one ad had a car with the license plate "XENA LVR" (Xena lover).

A subject of much interest and debate among viewers is the question of whether Xena and Gabrielle are lovers. The issue is left deliberately ambiguous by the writers. Jokes, innuendo, and other subtle evidence of a romantic relationship between Xena and Gabrielle is referred to as "lesbian subtext" or simply "subtext" by fans. The issue of the true nature of the Xena/Gabrielle relationship caused intense "shipping" debates in Xena fandom, which turned especially impassioned due to spillover from real-life debates about same-sex sexuality and gay rights.

Many fans felt that the sexual nature of Xena and Gabrielle's relationship was cemented by an interview given by Lucy Lawless to Lesbian News magazine in 2003. Lawless stated that after the series finale, where Gabrielle revives Xena with a mouth-to-mouth water transfer filmed to look like a full kiss, she had come to believe that Xena and Gabrielle's relationship was "definitely gay". "There was always a, 'Well, she might be or she might not be' but when there was that drip of water passing between their lips in the very final scene, that cemented it for me. Now it wasn't just that Xena was bisexual and kinda liked her gal pal and they kind of fooled around sometimes, it was 'Nope, they're married, man'."

=== Radical Edward ===
Edward Wong Hau Pepelu Tivrusky IV, also known as Ed, Radical Ed, and Radical Edward (real name Françoise Appledelhi) is an eccentric androgynous teenage hacker girl from the Cowboy Bebop animated series. Jade King, writing for TheGamer, stated that Ed's "androgynous appearance and willingness to abandon gender norms has made them a non-binary icon of sorts, whether it was intentional or not".

Mie Hiramoto, in her Multilingua paper ""Hey, You're a Girl?": Gendered Expressions in the Popular Anime, "Cowboy Bebop"", discussed Ed as a notable example of a gender-nonconforming character, and noted that her "non-conformity to feminine norms is not depicted by her use of masculine or feminine features, but by her predominant use of neutral features, or avoidance of gendered features". Andrea C. Keene likewise discussed Ed's character in the context of gender fludity, and Cowboy Bebop's voice actors described Ed as a "liquid" character that transcends all kinds of rigid definitions, including the gender binary.

In the 2021 TV series, Ed is portrayed by Eden Perkins, a non-binary actor.

=== Utena Tenjou ===
Utena Tenjou, the protagonist of Revolutionary Girl Utena, has earned cult status as an icon in the lesbian anime community for her breaking of gender norms and her relationship with Anthy Himemiya. Tenjou and Himemiya had a lasting impact on queer representation in anime. The anime itself was considered ahead of its time tackling themes of misogyny, internalized homophobia, and self-identity, leading to its queer cult status.

=== The Babadook ===
The Babadook's status as a gay icon is due mostly to a clerical error made by Netflix. In 2016, the 2014 horror movie was mistakenly added to Netflix's LGBTQ movie section. This caused an in-joke in the online queer community that the Babadook character is openly gay. "Haunting a small white family in an Australian suburb is a radical act, and the Babadook did that," said the writer John Paul Brammer, describing this radical act as inherently queer. The Babadook "seeks to break down the borders of acceptability and establishment" according to Vox. Others have suggested that the Babadook and the movie are queer representation because "the movie deals with themes of isolation, depression, and an inability to be oneself".

In 2019, IFC Films, the film's US distributor, released a limited Pride edition of the film on Blu-ray.

=== Mothman ===
Mothman has become a queer icon, with folklorist Camille Acosta dubbing the creature a "Lighthouse for the Othered" while scholar Brent Watts argues that "for language users who are both queer and Appalachian, engagement with and use of Mothman discourse and iconography can allow them a safe ideological space in which they can manage and maintain two nonnormative identities... through Mothman discourse, members of this community can also reimagine and redefine Appalachia in ways that challenge mainstream narratives about the region."

=== Motoko Kusanagi ===
Western fans of Motoko Kusanagi from Ghost in the Shell have regarded her as a bisexual icon, particularly due to a scene in the manga in which she has sex with two girlfriends while on vacation. Her chaotic and goofy personality in the manga has led fans to endearingly call her a "bisexual disaster".
