= List of gay anthems =

This is a list of historically significant gay anthems.

Year released	Song title	Artist(s)	Notes
1920	"The Lavender Song" ("Das Lila Lied")	Lyrics by Kurt Schwabach	
1928	"Prove It On Me"	Ma Rainey	
1929	"If Love Were All"	Noël Coward	Written for the operetta Bitter Sweet.
1932	"Mad About the Boy"	Noël Coward	
1937	"Easy Living"	Billie Holiday, Teddy Wilson and His Orchestra	(Note: "Easy Living" is referenced twice in the plot of the novel The Price of Salt (aka Carol): "[Therese] whistled part of it, and Carol smiled. '"Easy Living,"' Carol said. 'That's an old one.'"; and "Therese played "Easy Living" a couple of times, and Carol sat across the room watching her, sitting on the arm of a chair with her arms folded.")
1937	"My Funny Valentine"	Rodgers and Hart	
1938	"Lush Life"	Billy Strayhorn	
1939	"Over the Rainbow"	Judy Garland	Featured in the film The Wizard of Oz. Written by Harold Arlen and Yip Harburg. This song and the film gained such a following that gay men would use the phrase "friends of Dorothy" to refer to themselves.
1952	"Hound Dog"	Big Mama Thornton	
1953	"Secret Love"	Doris Day	Written by Sammy Fain and Paul Francis Webster for the queer-coded film Calamity Jane, the song was embraced by the LGBTQ community as an anthem for expressing the joy of gay liberation. When asked about how she felt during a 2011 interview with The Advocate, she replied, "I was not aware of that, but that's wonderful."
1954	"The Man That Got Away"	Judy Garland	
1955	"Tutti Frutti"	Little Richard	
1957	"Somewhere (There's a Place for Us)"	From the musical West Side Story	
1958	"My Baby Just Cares for Me"	Nina Simone	
1958	"Secretly"	Jimmie Rodgers	
1960	"As Long as He Needs Me"	Shirley Bassey	
1961	'"Nous les amoureux"	Jean-Claude Pascal	Pascal later claimed that the song was about a homosexual relationship and the difficulties it faced.
1962	"The Man I Love"	Gene Howard	
1962	"Happiness is a Thing Called Joe"	Troy Walker	
1963	"Hello Stranger"	Barbara Lewis	
1964	"You Don't Own Me"	Lesley Gore	
1966	"You Don't Have to Say You Love Me"	Dusty Springfield	
1966	"Ballad of the Sad Young Men"	Roberta Flack	
1968	"Don't Rain on My Parade"	Barbra Streisand	
1970	"Ain't No Mountain High Enough"	Diana Ross	
1970	"Lola"	The Kinks	
1970	"You Don't Own Me"	Dusty Springfield	
1971	"March from a Clockwork Orange"	Wendy Carlos	
1971	"Stonewall Nation"	Madeleine Davis	
1971	"It Must Be Love"	Labi Siffre	
1972	"Walk on the Wild Side"	Lou Reed	
1972	"All the Young Dudes"	Mott the Hoople	
1972	"Friends"	Bette Midler	
1972	"Starman"	David Bowie	
1974	"Rebel Rebel"	David Bowie	
1974	"I Will Always Love You"	Dolly Parton	
1974	"Jolene"	Dolly Parton	
1974	"Love Is the Message"	MFSB	
1974	"The Bitch Is Back"	Elton John	
1975	"I Was Born This Way"	Carl Bean	
1975	"I Was Born This Way"	Valentino	
1975	"Home"	Introduced by Stephanie Mills Popularised by Diana Ross	
1975	"Landslide"	Stevie Nicks of Fleetwood Mac	
1976	"Dancing Queen"	ABBA	
1976	"The Killing of Georgie"	Rod Stewart	
1976	"Turn the Beat Around"	Vicki Sue Robinson	
1976	"Somebody to Love"	Queen	
1977	"I Feel Love"	Donna Summer	
1977	"Gold Dust Woman"	Fleetwood Mac	
1978	"Got to Be Real"	Cheryl Lynn	
1978	"Baby I'm Burning"	Dolly Parton	
1978	"I Will Survive"	Gloria Gaynor	
1978	"Glad to Be Gay"	Tom Robinson Band	
1978	"You Make Me Feel (Mighty Real)"	Sylvester	
1978	"I Love the Nightlife"	Alicia Bridges	
1978	"Macho Man"	Village People	
1978	"Y.M.C.A."	Village People	
1978	"Last Dance"	Donna Summer	
1978	"I'm Every Woman"	Chaka Khan	
1978	"Pride"	Grace Jones	
1979	"Gimme! Gimme! Gimme! (A Man After Midnight)"	ABBA	
1979	"Boys Keep Swinging"	David Bowie	
1979	"You Know How to Love Me"	Phyllis Hyman	
1979	"Don't Stop Me Now"	Queen	
1979	"It's My House"	Diana Ross	
1979	"We Are Family"	Sister Sledge	
1979	"Knock on Wood"	Amii Stewart	
1979	"Rainbow Connection"	Kermit the Frog	
1979	"No More Tears (Enough Is Enough)"	Donna Summer & Barbra Streisand	
1979	"Go West"	Village People	
1979	"Stars"	Sylvester	
1980	"I'm Coming Out"	Diana Ross	
1980	"9 to 5"	Dolly Parton	
1980	"Retko te viđam sa devojkama"	Idoli	One of the first songs with a gay theme from Serbia.
1980	"Private Idaho"	The B-52's	
1980	"Never Knew Love Like This Before"	Stephanie Mills	
1981	"Menergy"	Patrick Cowley	
1981	"Pull Up to the Bumper"	Grace Jones	
1981	"Puerto Pollensa"	Written by Marilina Ross. First popularized by Sandra Mihanovich	
1981	"Tainted Love"	Soft Cell	
1982	"Edge of Seventeen"	Stevie Nicks	
1982	"Do You Really Want to Hurt Me"	Culture Club	
1982	"And I Am Telling You I'm Not Going"	Jennifer Holliday	
1982	"It's Raining Men"	The Weather Girls	
1982	"Love My Way"	The Psychedelic Furs	
1982	"Right on Target"	Paul Parker	
1983	"Church of the Poison Mind"	Culture Club	
1983	"This Charming Man"	The Smiths	
1983	"So Many Men, So Little Time"	Miquel Brown	
1983	"Rise Up"	The Parachute Club	
1983	"Relax"	Frankie Goes to Hollywood	
1983	"I Am What I Am"	Written by Jerry Herman	From the musical La Cage aux Folles.
1983	"I Am What I Am"	Gloria Gaynor	
1983	"Holiday"	Madonna	
1984	"Din Daa Daa"	George Kranz	
1984	"Smalltown Boy"	Bronski Beat	
1984	"Why?"	Bronski Beat	
1984	"You Think You're a Man"	Divine	
1984	"I Want to Break Free"	Queen	
1985	"Conga"	Miami Sound Machine	
1985	"Sisters Are Doin' It for Themselves"	Eurythmics and Aretha Franklin	
1985	"How Will I Know"	Whitney Houston	
1985	"Miss Celie's Blues"	Written by Quincy Jones, Rod Temperton and Lionel Richie	Also known as "Sister" from the film The Color Purple. Sung by the character Shug to Celie in the film, this song has been called an anthem for the Black lesbian community.
1985	"Running Up That Hill"	Kate Bush	
1985	"So Macho"	Sinitta, written by George Hargreaves	
1986	"¿A quién le importa?"	Alaska y Dinarama	Gay anthem in the Spanish-speaking world.
1986	"Don't Leave Me This Way"	The Communards	
1986	"Oh L'amour"	Erasure	
1986	"Libertine"	Mylène Farmer	Gay anthem in the French-speaking world
1986	"Kiss"	Prince	
1986	"True Colors"	Cyndi Lauper	
1987	"Seven Wonders"	Fleetwood Mac	
1987	"I Wanna Dance with Somebody (Who Loves Me)"	Whitney Houston	
1987	"It's a Sin"	Pet Shop Boys	
1987	"Sans contrefaçon"	Mylène Farmer	Gay anthem in the French-speaking world
1988	"A Little Respect"	Erasure	
1988	"Heaven Is a Place on Earth"	Belinda Carlisle	
1988	"Fast Car"	Tracy Chapman	
1988	"Mujer contra mujer" ("Une femme avec une femme")	Mecano	Gay anthem in the Spanish and French-speaking world.
1989	"Work That Pussy" (Boom Boom remix)	Ellis D	
1989	"Elements of Vogue" (David DePino mix)	David Xtravaganza and Johnny Dynell	
1989	"Deep in Vogue"	Malcolm McLaren	
1989	"Let's Go"	Fast Eddie	
1989	"In Private"	Dusty Springfield	
1989	"Express Yourself"	Madonna	
1989	"Like a Prayer"	Madonna	
1989	"If I Could Turn Back Time"	Cher	
1989	"Closer to Fine"	Indigo Girls	
1989	"Part of Your World" (from the film The Little Mermaid)	Composed by Ashman and Menken Introduced by Jodi Benson	
1990	"Vogue"	Madonna	
1990	"Freedom! '90"	George Michael	
1990	"Show Me Love"	Robin S.	
1991	"Finally"	CeCe Peniston	
1991	"Fancy"	Reba McEntire	
1991	"Better The Devil You Know"	Kylie Minogue	
1991	"In My Life"	Bette Midler	
1991	"Losing My Religion"	R.E.M.	
1991	"Justified and Ancient"	The KLF and Tammy Wynette	
1992	"Constant Craving"	K.d. lang	
1992	"Damn I Wish I Was Your Lover"	Sophie B. Hawkins	
1992	"Supermodel (You Better Work)"	RuPaul	
1992	"Deeper and Deeper"	Madonna	
1993	"Come to My Window"	Melissa Etheridge	
1993	"Yes I Am"	Melissa Etheridge	
1993	"I'm Every Woman" (theme from the film The Bodyguard)	Whitney Houston	
1993	"Rebel Girl"	Bikini Kill	
1993	"What's Up"	4 Non Blondes	
1994	"A Deeper Love"	Aretha Franklin	
1994	"She Thinks His Name Was John"	Reba McEntire	
1994	"100% Pure Love"	Crystal Waters	
1994	"Girls & Boys"	Blur	
1994	"Feel What You Want"	Kristine W	
1994	"All I Want for Christmas Is You"	Mariah Carey	
1995	"Everlasting Love"	Gloria Estefan	
1995	"I Kissed a Girl"	Jill Sobule	
1995	"Fastlove"	George Michael	
1995	"Jesus to a Child"	George Michael	
1995	"Waterfalls"	TLC	
1995	"I Am the Body Beautiful"	Salt N Pepa	
1996	"Cunty"	Kevin Aviance	
1996	"Seasons of Love" (theme from the musical Rent)	Introduced in the musical Rent	
1996	"Take Me or Leave Me"	Idina Menzel and Fredi Walker	
1996	"Wannabe"	Spice Girls	
1997	"Fly Life"	Basement Jaxx	
1997	"Free"	Ultra Naté	
1997	"Together Again"	Janet Jackson	
1997	"Close My Eyes"	Mariah Carey	
1997	"Outside"	Mariah Carey	
1997	"One More Hour"	Sleater-Kinney	
1998	"Heaven's What I Feel"	Gloria Estefan	
1998	"Believe"	Cher	
1998	"Nobody's Supposed to Be Here" (Hex Hector remix)	Deborah Cox	
1998	"The Origin of Love"	Introduced in Hedwig and the Angry Inch	
1998	"The Boy Is Mine"	Brandy & Monica	
1998	"Outside"	George Michael	
1999	"Man! I Feel Like a Woman!"	Shania Twain	
1999	"Waiting for Tonight"	Jennifer Lopez	
1999	"Strong Enough"	Cher	
1999	"Heartbreaker"	Mariah Carey	
1999	"It's Not Right but It's Okay" (Thunderpuss remix)	Whitney Houston	
2000	"Can't Take That Away (Mariah's Theme)"	Mariah Carey	
2000	"Let's Get Loud"	Jennifer Lopez	
2000	"Spinning Around"	Kylie Minogue	
2000	"Proud"	Heather Small	
2000	"Stronger"	Britney Spears	
2000	"Sobreviviré"	Mónica Naranjo	
2001	"Lady Marmalade" (theme from the film Moulin Rouge!)	Christina Aguilera, Mýa, Lil' Kim and Pink	
2001	"Song for the Lonely"	Cher	
2001	"I'm a Survivor"	Reba McEntire	
2001	"It's Raining Men" (theme from the film Bridget Jones's Diary)	Geri Halliwell	
2001	"Keep on Livin'"	Le Tigre	
2001	"Murder on the Dancefloor"	Sophie Ellis-Bextor	
2001	"There You'll Be" (theme from the film Pearl Harbor)	Faith Hill	
2001	"Your Disco Needs You"	Kylie Minogue	
2001	"Can't Get You Out of My Head"	Kylie Minogue	
2002	"¿A quién le importa?"	Thalía	Gay anthem in the Spanish-speaking world and cover of the Alaska and Dinarama song from 1986.
2002	"All The Things She Said"	t.A.T.u.	
2002	"Beautiful"	Christina Aguilera	
2002	"Love at First Sight"	Kylie Minogue	
2003	"Defying Gravity"	Idina Menzel	
2003	"Fighter"	Christina Aguilera	
2003	"Me Against the Music"	Britney Spears featuring Madonna	
2003	"Dragostea Din Tei"	O-Zone	
2004	"Take Your Mama"	Scissor Sisters	
2005	"Hung Up"	Madonna	
2006	"Listen"	Beyoncé	
2006	"Freakum Dress"	Beyoncé	
2006	"Stars Are Blind"	Paris Hilton	
2006	"The Best of Both Worlds"	Hannah Montana	
2006	"Buttons"	The Pussycat Dolls	
2006	"Todos Me Miran"	Gloria Trevi	Gay anthem in the Spanish-speaking world
2006	"Something Kinda Oooh"	Girls Aloud	
2007	"Get Me Bodied"	Beyoncé	
2007	"Gimme More"	Britney Spears	
2007	"Las de la Intuición"	Shakira	
2007	"Untouched"	The Veronicas	
2008	"I Kissed a Girl"	Katy Perry	
2009	"Untouchable"	Girls Aloud	
2009	"She Wolf"	Shakira	
2010	"We R Who We R"	Kesha	
2010	"All The Lovers"	Kylie Minogue	
2010	"Get Outta My Way"	Kylie Minogue	
2010	"Firework"	Katy Perry	
2010	"Raise Your Glass"	Pink	
2010	"Dancing on My Own"	Robyn	
2010	"Y'all Get Back Now"	Big Freedia	
2010	"Vogue" (Glee Cast version)	Glee Cast feat. Jane Lynch	Sue Sylvester's line reading of "Will Schuester, I Hate You" is a recurring viral meme and pop culturally reference point within the LGBTQ community
2011	"Born This Way"	Lady Gaga	
2011	"Run The World (Girls)"	Beyoncé	
2011	"Love On Top"	Beyoncé	
2012	"Call Me Maybe"	Carly Rae Jepsen	
2012	"Euphoria"	Loreen	
2012	"Same Love"	Macklemore and Ryan Lewis featuring Mary Lambert	
2012	"Thinkin Bout You"	Frank Ocean	
2012	"Let's Have a Kiki"	Scissor Sisters	
2013	"Land of Lola"	Billy Porter	
2013	"Raise You Up/Just Be"	Billy Porter	
2013	"Follow Your Arrow"	Kacey Musgraves	
2013	"People Like Us"	Kelly Clarkson	
2013	"Closer"	Tegan and Sara	
2013	"She Keeps Me Warm"	Mary Lambert	
2013	"Brave"	Sara Bareilles	
2013	"Girls / Girls / Boys"	Panic! at the Disco	
2013	"Let It Go"	Idina Menzel	
2013	"Work Bitch"	Britney Spears	
2014	"True Trans Soul Rebel"	Against Me!	
2014	"Break Free"	Ariana Grande	
2014	"Born An Angel"	Afida Turner	
2014	"Can't Remember to Forget You"	Shakira	
2014	"Really Don't Care"	Demi Lovato featuring Cher Lloyd	
2014	"Sissy That Walk"	RuPaul	
2014	"Welcome To New York"	Taylor Swift	
2015	"Beauty Never Lies"	Bojana Stamenov	
2015	"Run Away with Me"	Carly Rae Jepsen	
2015	"Cool for the Summer"	Demi Lovato	
2015	"Girls Like Girls"	Hayley Kiyoko	
2015	"Going Out Like That"	Reba McEntire	
2015	"King"	Years & Years	
2016	"Secret Love Song, Pt II"	Little Mix	
2016	"Vroom Vroom"	Charli XCX	
2016	"Work from Home"	Fifth Harmony	
2016	"Into You"	Ariana Grande	
2016	"Only a Girl"	Gia Woods	
2016	"Formation"	Beyoncé	
2016	"Hold Up"	Beyoncé	
2016	"Sorry"	Beyoncé	
2016	"Change"	Christina Aguilera	
2016	"Telepathy"	Christina Aguilera	
2016	"Touch"	Little Mix	
2016	"LGBT"	CupcakKe	
2016	"Tomodachi"	Hikaru Utada	
2016	"I Know a Place"	Muna	
2017	"Loving Someone"	The 1975	
2017	"The Joke"	Brandi Carlile	
2017	"Heart Attack"	Chuu	
2017	"Cut to the Feeling"	Carly Rae Jepsen	
2017	"New Rules"	Dua Lipa	
2017	"Chanel"	Frank Ocean	
2017	"Power"	Little Mix	
2017	"Boys"	Charli XCX	
2017	"Call Me Mother"	RuPaul	
2017	"This Is Me" (theme from the film The Greatest Showman)	Keala Settle	
2017	"Honey"	Kehlani	
2017	"Heaven"	Troye Sivan and Betty Who	
2017	"Mystery of Love" (theme from the film Call Me by Your Name)	Sufjan Stevens	
2017	"Visions of Gideon"	Sufjan Stevens	
2018	"Crayons"	Cupcakke	
2018	"Curious"	Hayley Kiyoko	
2018	"Strawberries & Cigarettes"	Troye Sivan	
2018	"My My My!"	Troye Sivan	
2018	"Bloom"	Troye Sivan	
2018	"Make Me Feel"	Janelle Monae	
2018	"Pynk"	Janelle Monae	
2018	"No Tears Left to Cry"	Ariana Grande	
2018	"Thank U, Next"	Ariana Grande	
2018	"I'm Not Afraid"	Holland	
2018	"Rainbow"	Kacey Musgraves	
2018	"Immaterial"	Sophie	
2018	"Colour"	MNEK and Hailee Steinfeld	
2018	"Eastside"	benny blanco, Halsey and Khalid	
2019	"On a Roll"	Ashley O	
2019	"Break Up (Bye Bye)"	The Frock Destroyers	
2019	"Nails, Hair, Hips, Heels"	Todrick Hall	
2019	"Don't Start Now"	Dua Lipa	
2019	"Show Yourself"	Idina Menzel	
2019	"A Little Bit Alexis"	Annie Murphy	
2019	"Lights Up"	Harry Styles	
2019	"You Need to Calm Down"	Taylor Swift	
2019	"Flash Pose"	Pabllo Vittar feat. Charli XCX	
2020	"Betty"	Taylor Swift	
2020	"Physical"	Dua Lipa	
2020	"Man's World"	Marina Diamandis	
2020	"Rain On Me"	Lady Gaga and Ariana Grande	
2020	"Supernova"	Kylie Minogue	
2020	"Pink Pony Club"	Chappell Roan	
2021	"Agatha All Along"	Kathryn Hahn	from the miniseries "WandaVision"
2021	"Montero (Call Me by Your Name)"	Lil Nas X	
2021	"UK Hun?"	United Kingdolls	
2021	"Come Through"	Priyanka feat. Lemon	
2021	"Walk"	Saucy Santana	
2022	"Boyfriend"	Dove Cameron	
2022	"Boys Don't Cry"	Anitta	
2022	"This Hell"	Rina Sawayama	
2022	"Cozy"	Beyoncé	
2022	"Break My Soul"	Beyoncé	
2022	"Bad Habit"	Steve Lacy	
2022	"Unholy"	Sam Smith feat. Kim Petras	Replaced Lacy's song "Bad Habits" at the top of the Billboard Hot 100 in October 2022, marking the first time two consecutive number one songs were performed by out queer artists. Lacy is bisexual; Petras is a transgender woman and Smith is non-binary (previously publicly identified as a gay man)
2022	"Huwag Muna Tayong Umuwi" (Note: lit. 'Let's Not Go Home Yet')	Bini	The song was co-written by Nica del Rosario, who is openly queer, Its "genderless" lyrics led it resonate with the LGBTQIA+ community. The song also entered on Billboard Philippines' Hot 100.
2022	"Casual"	Chappell Roan	
2023	"Let Loose"	Loosey LaDuca	
2023	"Not Strong Enough"	Boygenius	
2023	"Because of You"	Gustaph	
2023	"Padam Padam"	Kylie Minogue	
2023	"Rush"	Troye Sivan	
2023	"Speed Drive"	Charli XCX	
2023	"Float"	Janelle Monáe	
2023	"Lipstick Lover"	Janelle Monáe	
2023	"Ice Slippin"	Omar Apollo	
2023	"Bongos"	Cardi B and Megan Thee Stallion	
2023	"Got Me Started"	Troye Sivan	
2023	"Loveher"	Romy	
2023	"Red Wine Supernova"	Chappell Roan	
2023	"One of Your Girls"	Troye Sivan	
2024	"Yes, And?"	Ariana Grande	
2024	"Bodyguard"	Beyoncé	
2024	"Good Luck, Babe!"	Chappell Roan	
2024	"Nasty"	Tinashe	
2024	"360"	Charli XCX	
2024	"Lunch"	Billie Eilish	
2024	"Joyride"	Kesha	
2025	"Hotbox"	Lil Nas X	
2025	"Abracadabra"	Lady Gaga	
2025	"The Giver"	Chappell Roan	
2025	"Berghain"	Rosalía, Björk, and Yves Tumor	
2025	"Stateside" _{Zara Larsson Remix version}	PinkPantheress and Zara Larsson	
2026	"Bring Your Love"	Madonna and Sabrina Carpenter	

== See also ==
- LGBTQ music
- LGBTQ marketing
