= The Abbey (bar) =

Gay bar in West Hollywood, United States

The Abbey Food and Bar
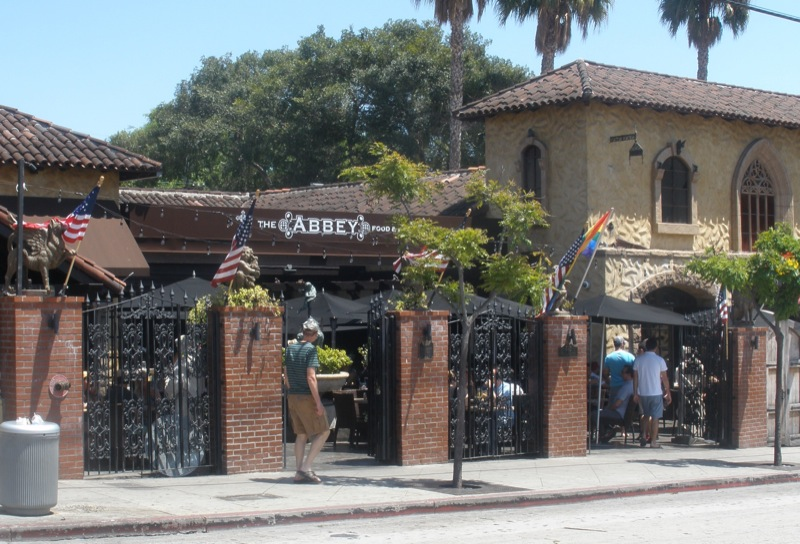
- Interactive map of The Abbey Food and Bar

Restaurant information
- Established: 1991
- Location: 686 North Robertson Boulevard, West Hollywood, California
- Coordinates: 34°05′00″N 118°23′07″W
- Website: theabbeyweho.com

The Abbey Food and Bar is a gay bar in West Hollywood, California. The Abbey is a core part of LGBT culture in Los Angeles, and has expanded several times since its establishment in 1991. In 2016, the Abbey opened the adjacent nightclub The Chapel at the Abbey.

In 2006, owner and founder David Cooley sold a 75-percent stake of the Abbey to SBE Group. Nine years later, he re-bought the stake, becoming sole owner. In 2023, Cooley sold the Abbey and the Chapel to Tristan Schukraft.

As of 2021, the Abbey has 275 employees.

== Description ==
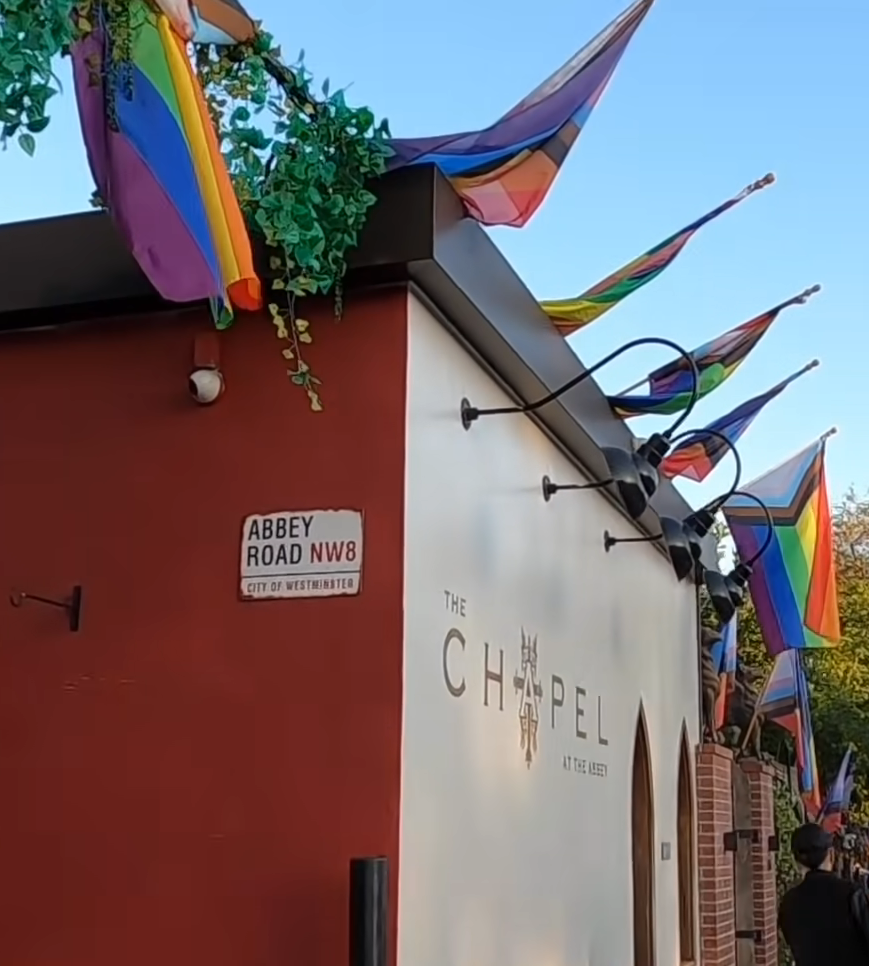
Progress Pride flags hang outside the Chapel.

The Abbey is located at 686 North Robertson Boulevard in the Boystown gayborhood of West Hollywood, California. It is near Sur and the now-closed Pump, two restaurants owned by Lisa Vanderpump. Lyft has stated that The Abbey is among the most popular locations for its ridesharing services.

=== Structure and design ===
The Abbey has expanded over time, with its several enterprises having a footprint of about 16,000 square feet (1,500 m^{2}) and four bar counters. The Abbey has four rooms and a patio. In one of the rooms is Within, a cocktail lounge that is described as "sleek and contemporary". Unlike The Abbey, Within does not have go-go dancers. The Abbey also has a pastry shop. The Abbey's nightclub, the Chapel, is about 5,500 square feet. Like the Abbey, the Chapel has "gothic architecture, religious statuary, [and] stained-glass windows."

=== Culture and atmosphere ===
Interior of the Abbey

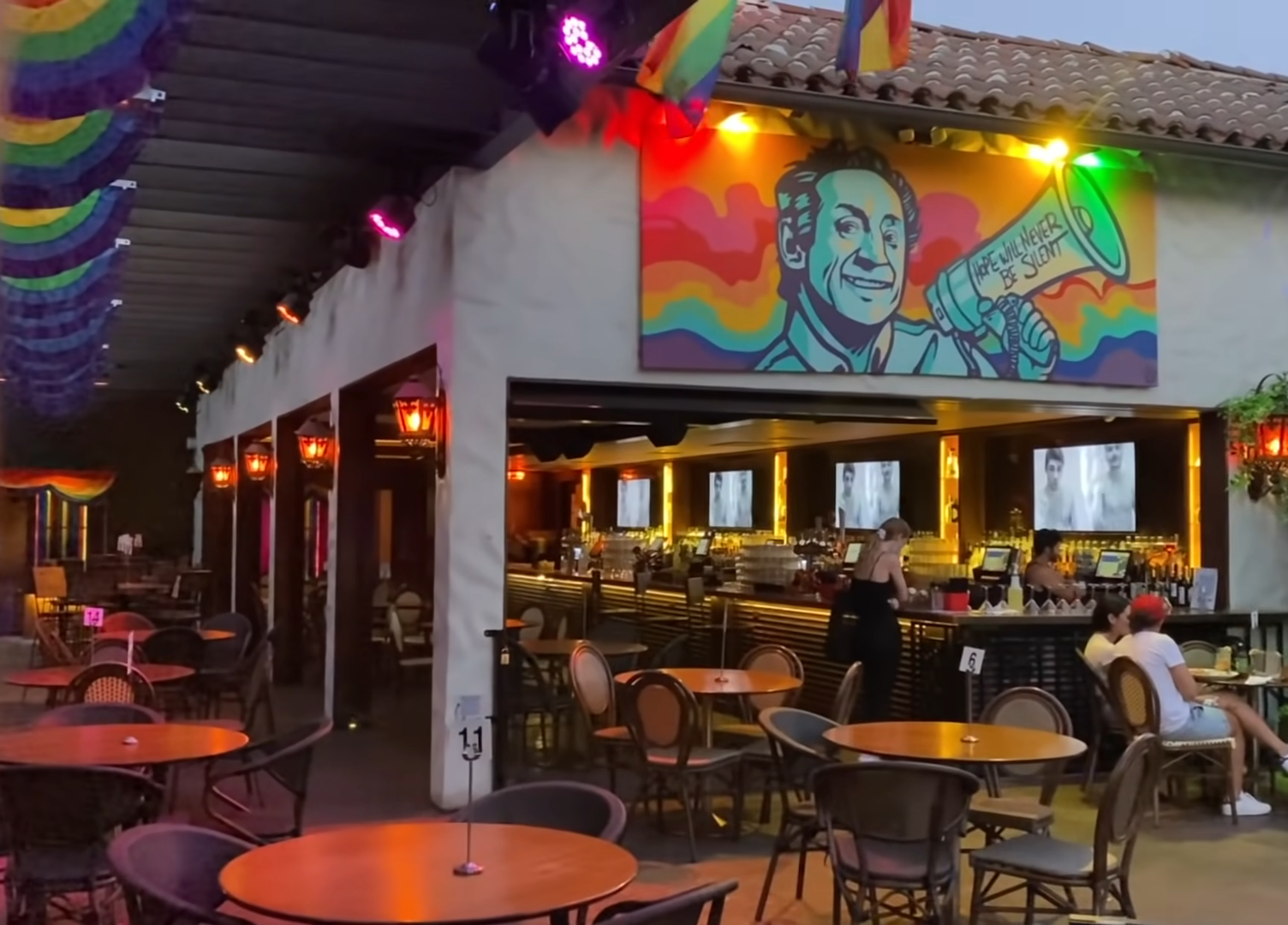
Mural of Harvey Milk

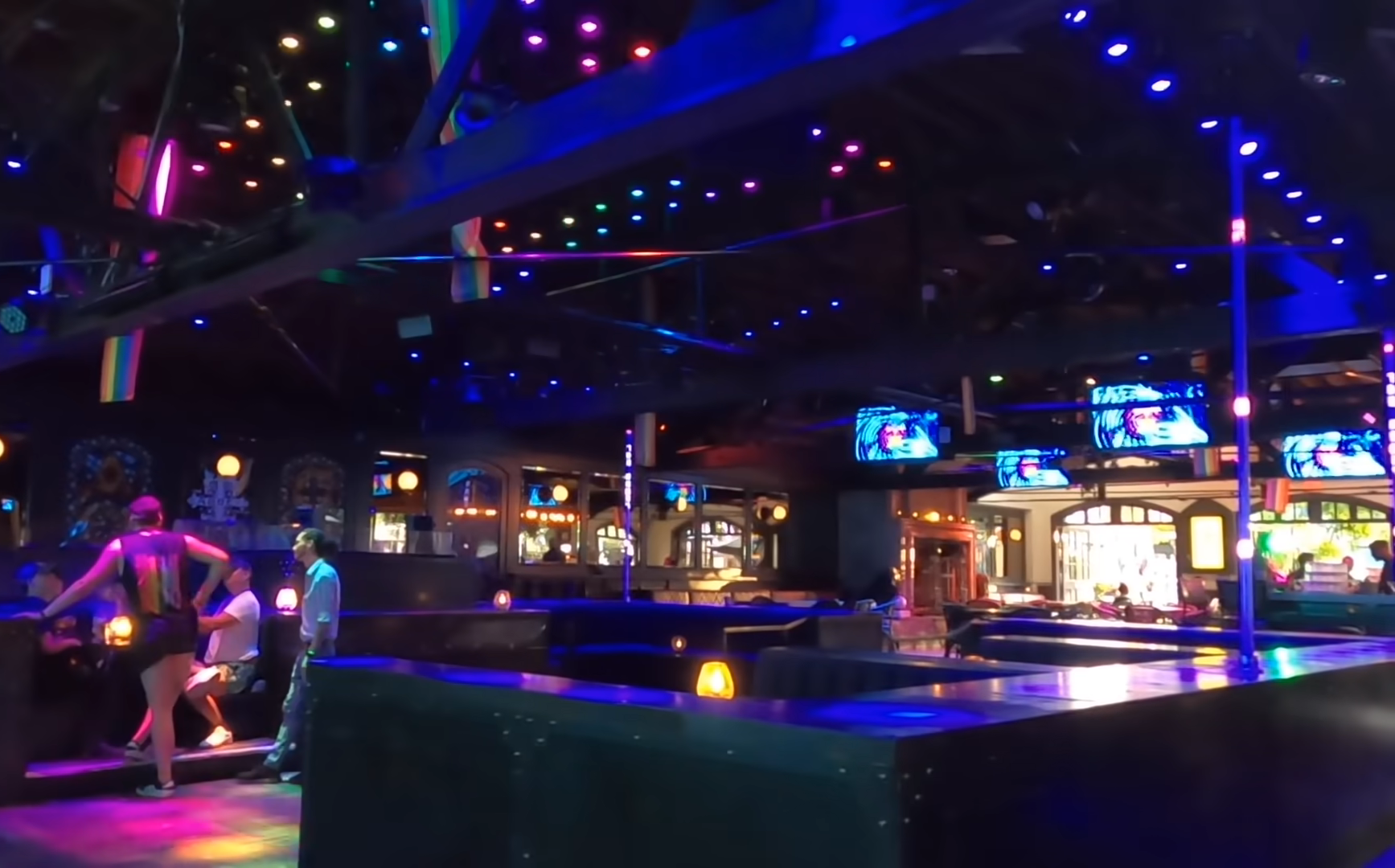
Stage and poles for go-go dancers

The "Los Angeles equivalent to the Stonewall Inn", the Abbey is considered a central part of LGBT culture in Los Angeles. According to Michelle Visage, the Abbey "has a homey feeling where you can just sit outside and eat or go in and gyrate". The bar's signature drink is the appletini, which they say was created there. Drinks at the Abbey are known for being strong.

Cooley has said, "So many gay bars have closed because they catered only to certain clientele. I use go-go boys and girls. We welcome straight, bi, gay, lesbian, transgendered, everyone." In its early years, The Abbey served "an almost exclusively gay clientele". According to general manager Todd Barnes in 2020, "about 80 percent" of the Chapel's patrons are gay, while the clientele at the Abbey is "probably about 50/50".

The Abbey has hosted fundraisers, including political fundraisers for presidential candidates Barack Obama, Hillary Clinton, and Pete Buttigieg. Since 2006, the Abbey has hosted "Christmas in September", a toy drive for Children's Hospital Los Angeles. The Abbey has been host to many celebrities, and was frequently visited by Elizabeth Taylor.

== History ==
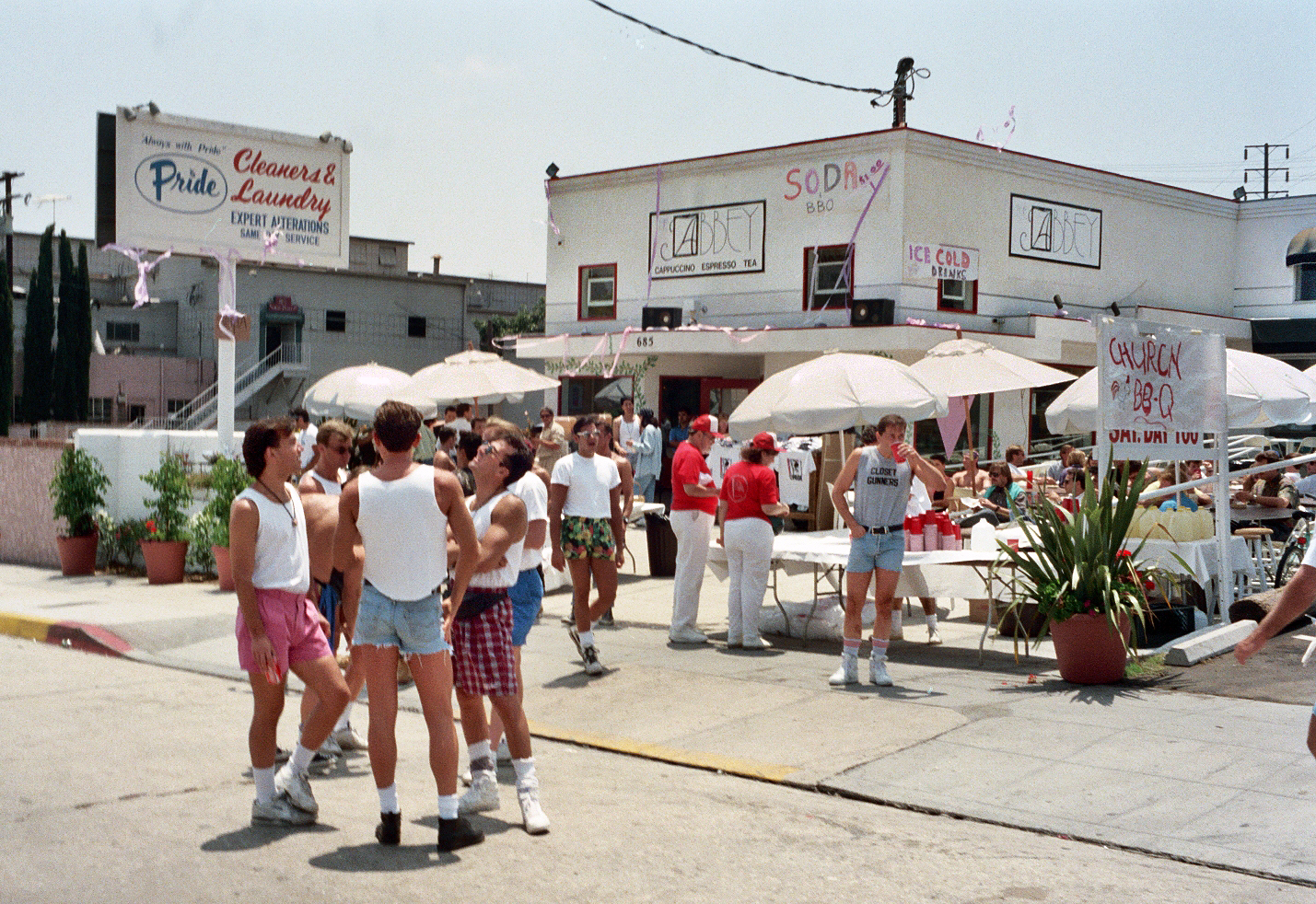
The Abbey, June 1991

In 1991, the Abbey was founded by investment banker David Cooley as a coffeehouse on the east side of Robertson Boulevard. Three years later, the Abbey moved into a former pottery shop across the street. With his business partner, Cooley decorated the space with pews and stained glass. The Abbey transitioned into a bar when it obtained a beer and wine license (1994) and a liquor license (1996). In its early years, The Abbey hosted community activists such as ACT UP.

In May 2012, the Abbey announced that it would not permit straight bachelorette parties until gay marriage was legalized. In a statement, the Abbey said that straight bachelorette partygoers were "completely unaware that the people around them are legally prohibited from getting married." The Abbey began allowing straight bachelorette parties after Proposition 8, which banned same-sex marriage in California, was overturned.

In 2017, E! released What Happens at The Abbey, a reality television show starring Cooley and employees of The Abbey. The show, which had one season, was compared to Vanderpump Rules.

The Abbey temporarily closed four times due to the COVID-19 pandemic.

In 2021, a patron alleged she was drugged by a bartender at the Abbey. After being shown security footage, the patron retracted the claim and said her drink had not been tampered with. The Abbey filed a $5 million defamation lawsuit, claiming that the patron broke contract terms by continuing to make allegations after having agreed to make a correction statement. In 2024, The 19th published a report alleging a pattern of druggings and sexual assaults at the Abbey. The 19th reported that they investigated claims from 2007 to 2023, seven of which had resulted in a lawsuit. From 2016 to 2021, the Abbey was associated with the highest number of reported rapes and sexual assaults among establishments in West Hollywood. Edward Ramirez, captain of the West Hollywood Sheriff’s Station, attributed this to the Abbey's position as the most popular nightlife destination in the area.

=== Ownership and expansion ===
In 2006, Cooley sold a 75-percent stake to SBE Group for about $10 million, staying involved as president. Cooley said that while under SBE ownership, he "made all the decisions". SBE and its CEO Sam Nazarian had plans to expand the Abbey to other cities. In 2012, Cooley said that he and SBE had considered expansion options in "multiple locations in many cities". There was belief that the Abbey would open a venue in the Boystown neighborhood of Chicago, but this did not happen.

In 2015, Cooley bought his stake back, becoming sole owner. Nazarian said, "we feel that it makes sense to hand the reins of The Abbey back to its passionate founder and leader so that he can lead the Abbey’s next exciting chapter." Cooley said, "Discussions were coming up about [me] getting The Abbey back. Sam is going in to another direction and he’s selling off his restaurants and nightlife group and focusing on his hotels." Following the sale, Cooley also said that he was considering expanding The Abbey outside of California, such as to New York City, Miami, or Chicago.

In 2016, Cooley bought the gay bar Here Lounge, located adjacent to the Abbey at 694 North Robertson Boulevard. The Abbey then opened The Chapel At The Abbey, a "cocktail-focused nightclub", at the newly-acquired location. In 2019, the Abbey opened a "bar inside a bar" called Within.

In July 2023, The Abbey Food and Bar and The Chapel at The Abbey were listed for sale. Upon the listing's publication, Cooley did not offer comments to any media organizations. West Hollywood mayor Sepi Shyne said, "The city of West Hollywood has been aware for some time that David Cooley [...] is retiring and has been considering selling." She also said, "It's the city's hope that The Abbey will continue, under future ownership, to be a ground-breaking LGBTQ destination in the city’s Rainbow District for many years into the future." The Los Angeles Business Journal reported that The Abbey was listed for sale due to West Hollywood's new minimum wage law, which went into effect on July 1, 2023. According to the Business Journal, a source "familiar with the business" said, "[Cooley] told [Shyne] that he had never before thought of closing until now seeing their policy destroying us [...] The policy adds another million dollars to the Abbey's expenses". In November 2023, The Abbey Food & Bar announced the sale of the Abbey and the Chapel to entrepreneur Tristan Schukraft for a reported $45,000,000.

== See also ==
- LGBT history in California
- List of LGBTQ bars
