= GLAAD Vanguard Award =

Award presented at the GLAAD Media Awards

- Type: LGBTQ
- Awarded for: Promoting LGBTQ rights
- Location: Los Angeles, California
- Country: United States
- First award: 1993

The GLAAD Vanguard Award is a special GLAAD Media Award presented annually at the GLAAD Media Awards ceremony held in Los Angeles. It is presented to a member of the entertainment community who does not identify as LGBTQ but who has made a significant difference in promoting equal rights for LGBTQ people.

== List of recipients ==
- 1993 – Roseanne Barr, Tom Arnold
- 1994 – Aaron Spelling
- 1995 – Steve Tisch
- 1996 – Sidney Sheinberg
- 1997 – Cristina Saralegui
- 1998 – Cher
- 1999 – Whoopi Goldberg
- 2000 – Elizabeth Taylor
- 2002 – Shirley MacLaine
- 2003 – Eric McCormack
- 2004 – Antonio Banderas
- 2005 – Liza Minnelli
- 2006 – Charlize Theron
- 2007 – Jennifer Aniston
- 2008 – Janet Jackson
- 2009 – Kathy Griffin
- 2010 – Drew Barrymore
- 2011 – Kristin Chenoweth
- 2012 – Josh Hutcherson
- 2014 – Jennifer Lopez
- 2015 – Kerry Washington
- 2016 – Demi Lovato
- 2017 – Patricia Arquette
- 2018 – Britney Spears
- 2019 – Beyoncé, Jay-Z
- 2020 – Taylor Swift
- 2022 – Kacey Musgraves
- 2023 – Bad Bunny
- 2024 – Oprah Winfrey
