= Pinegrove discography =

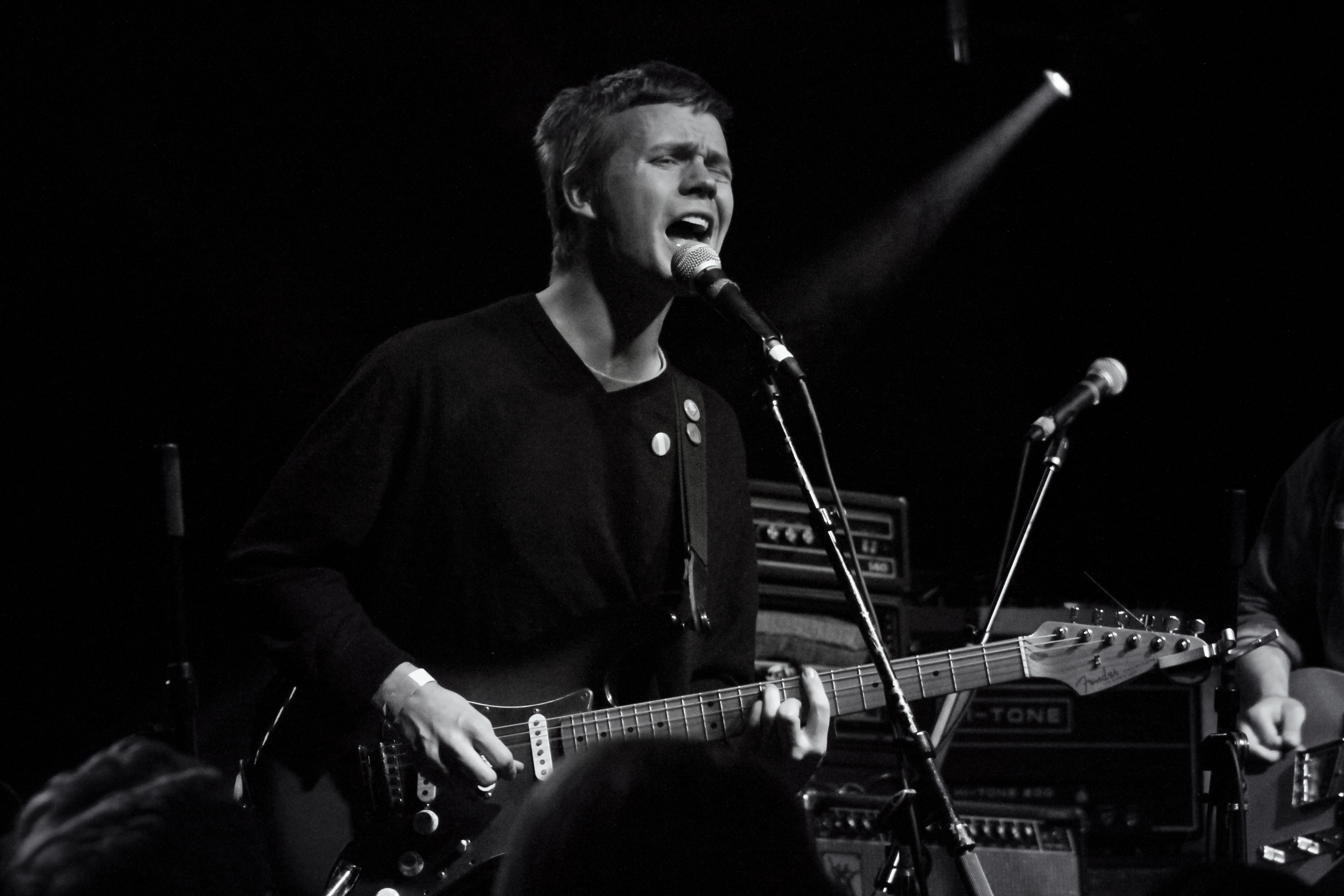
- Evan Stephens Hall, the band's frontman and singer-songwriter, performing in 2016
- Studio albums: 5
- EPs: 3
- Live albums: 5
- Compilation albums: 1
- Singles: 14
- Music videos: 5

Pinegrove, an American rock band, have released five studio albums, five live albums, one compilation album, three extended plays (EPs), fourteen singles, and five music videos.

== Albums ==
=== Studio albums ===
List of studio albums, with selected chart positions, sales figures and certifications
Title	Album details	Peak chart positions				
Title	Album details	US	US Heat.	US Ind.	US Rock	SCO
Meridian	Released: February 29, 2012; Label: Self-released; Formats: Digital download, streaming	—	—	—	—	—
Cardinal	Released: February 12, 2016; Label: Run for Cover; Formats: LP, CD, CS, digital download, streaming	—	7	24	36	—
Skylight	Released: September 28, 2018; Label: Self-released; Formats: LP, CD, CS, digital download, streaming	—	15	38	—	—
Marigold	Released: January 17, 2020; Label: Rough Trade; Formats: LP, CD, CS, digital download, streaming	176	2	16	25	53
11:11	Released: January 28, 2022; Label: Rough Trade; Formats: LP, CD, digital download, streaming	—	3	—	—	—
"—" denotes a recording that did not chart or was not released in that territory.

=== Live albums ===
Evan Stephens Hall stated that the proceeds of Elsewhere 3, 2, & 1 will be donated "to organizations supporting victims of the genocide & ongoing apartheid in Palestine" split between Medical Aid for Palestinians, Oxfam and Gaza Skate team.

List of live albums, with selected details
Title	Album details
Pinegrove on Audiotree Live	Released: May 27, 2016; Label: Audiotree; Formats: Digital download, streaming
Elsewhere	Released: January 20, 2017; Label: Run for Cover; Formats: Digital download, streaming
Elsewhere 2	Released: April 21, 2020; Label: Rough Trade; Formats: Digital download, streaming
Amperland, NY	Released: January 15, 2021; Label: Rough Trade; Formats: LP, CD, digital download, streaming
Montclair (Live at the Wellmont Theater)	Released: May 12, 2023; Label: Rough Trade; Formats: Digital download, streaming
Elsewhere 3	Released: October 3, 2025; Label: Formats: Digital download, streaming

=== Compilation albums ===
List of compilation albums, with selected details
Title	Album details
Everything So Far	Released: 2014 (original) October 9, 2015 (reissue); Label: Self-released/Run for Cover; Formats: LP, CD, CS, digital download, streaming

== Extended plays ==
List of extended plays, with selected details
Title	EP details
Mixtape One	Released: January 1, 2010; Label: Self-released; Format: Digital download, streaming
&	Released: July 25, 2013; Label: Self-released; Format: Digital download, streaming
Mixtape Two	Released: May 29, 2014; Label: Self-released; Format: Digital download, streaming

== Singles ==
List of singles, showing year released and album name
Title	Year	Chart positions		Album
Title	Year	US AAA	US Rock	Album
"Problems"	2015	—	—	Everything So Far
"New Friends"	2015	—	—	Everything So Far
"Old Friends"	2016	—	—	Cardinal
"Cadmium"	2016	—	—	Cardinal
"Intrepid"	2017	—	—	Skylight
"Moment"	2019	—	—	Marigold
"Phase"	2019	34	—	Marigold
"The Alarmist"	2020	—	—	Marigold
"Morningtime (Amperland, NY)"	2020	—	—	Amperland, NY
"Orange"	2021	—	—	11:11
"Alaska"	2021	—	—	11:11
"Respirate"	2022	—	—	11:11
"Habitat"	2022	—	—	11:11
"Need 2"	2023	—	12	Mixtape Two

== Videography ==
=== Music videos ===
List of music videos, showing year released and directors
Title	Year	Director(s)
"Then Again"	2016	Evan Stephens Hall
"Size of the Moon"	2017	Will Arbery
"Phase"	2019	Colin Read
"Endless"	2020	Brian Paccione
"Habitat"	2022	Brian Paccione

=== Concert films ===
List of concert films, showing year released and directors
Title	Year	Director(s)
Amperland, NY	2021	Kenna Hynes
Montclair: Live at the Wellmont Theater	2023	Brian Paccione
