= List of songs recorded by Pinegrove =

The American rock band Pinegrove has recorded songs for five studio albums, as well as three extended plays. This list comprises the band's recorded catalog, which consists of 61 songs.

== Songs ==
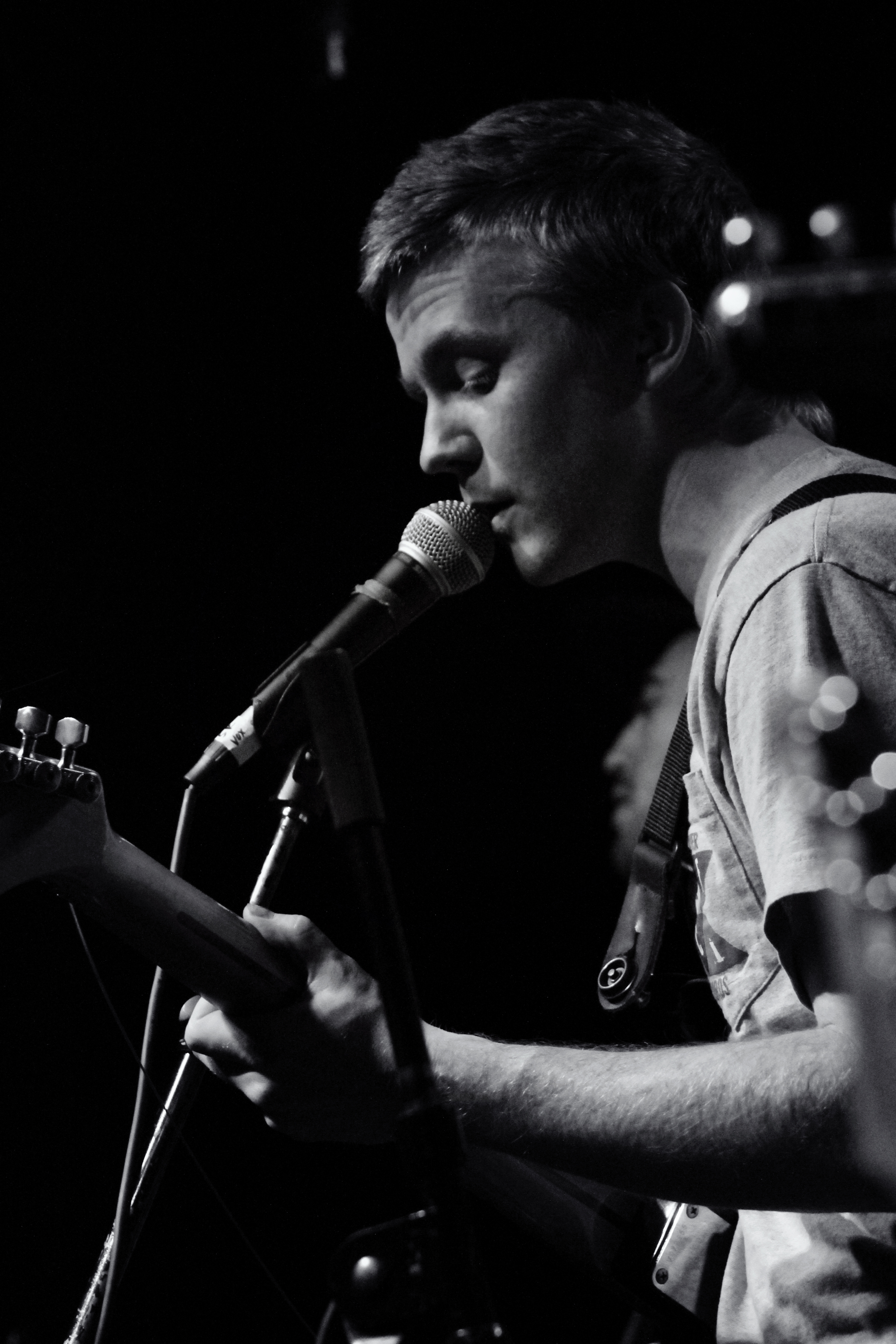
Singer-songwriter Evan Stephens Hall performing in 2016.

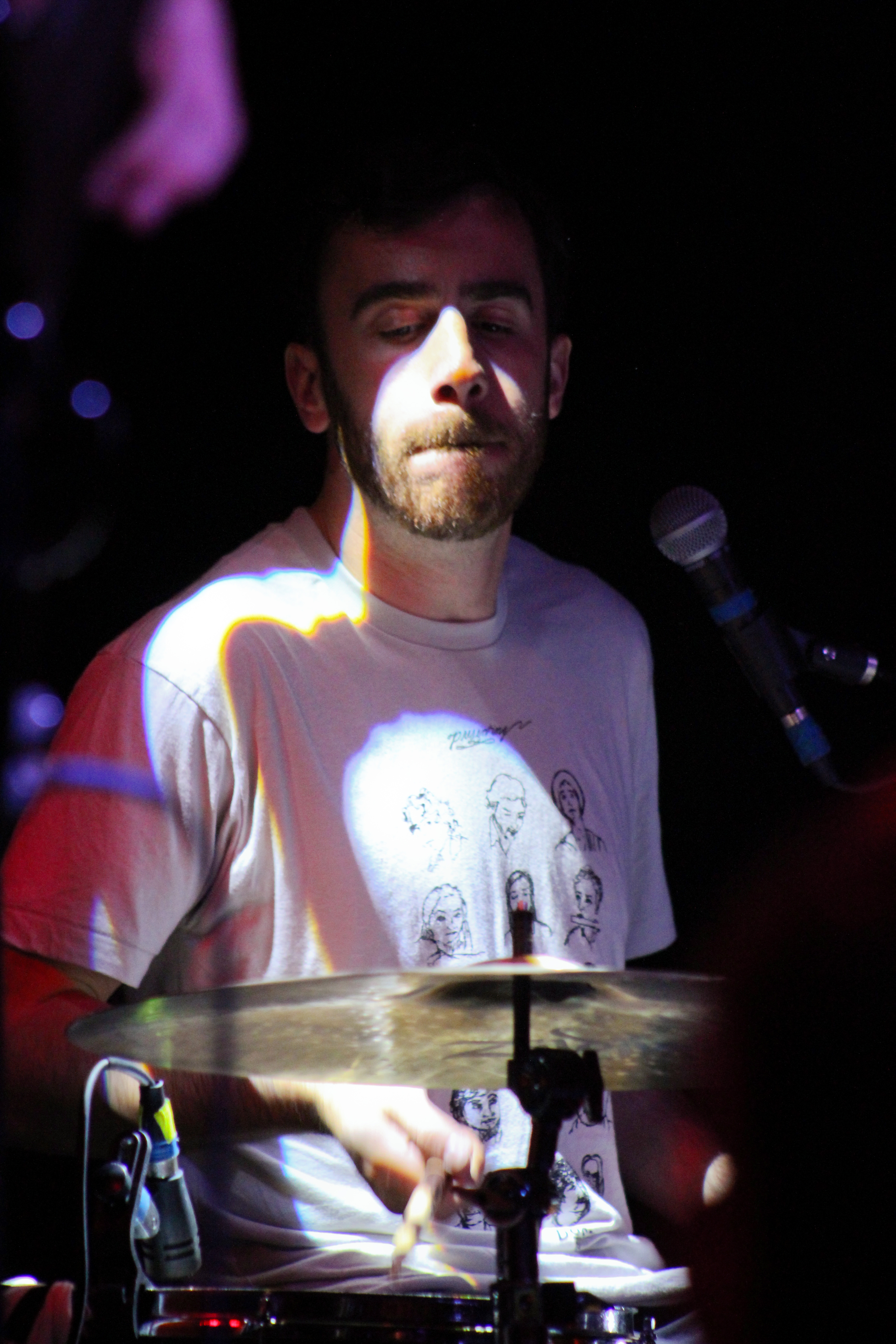
Drummer Zack Levine performing in 2016.

Keydan
| † | Indicates single release |

Name of song, originating album, and year released.
| Song | Year | Album | Ref. |
|---|---|---|---|
| "11th Hour" | 2022 | 11:11 | |
| "&" | 2013 | & | |
| "Alaska" | 2021 | 11:11 | |
| "Alcove" | 2020 | Marigold | |
| "Amulets" | 2018 | Skylight | |
| "Angelina" (Note: Song was later re-recorded for Skylight.) | 2014 | Everything So Far | |
| "Aphasia" (Note: Demo version available on an expanded edition of Cardinal.) | 2016 | Cardinal | |
| "Cadmium" | 2016 | Cardinal | |
| "Cyclone" | 2020 | 11:11 | |
| "Darkness" | 2018 | Skylight | |
| "DAYS" | 2010 | Mixtape One | |
| "Dotted Line" | 2020 | Marigold | |
| "Easy Enough" | 2018 | Skylight | |
| "Endless" | 2020 | Marigold | |
| "Flora" | 2020 | 11:11 | |
| "Give Up" | 2020 | Non-album single | |
| "Habitat" | 2022 | 11:11 | |
| "Hairpin" | 2020 | Marigold | |
| "Intrepid" | 2018 | Skylight | |
| "Iodine" | 2022 | 11:11 | |
| "Light On" | 2018 | Skylight | |
| "Marigold" | 2020 | Marigold | |
| "Mather Knoll" | 2012 | Meridian | |
| "Moment" | 2020 | Marigold | |
| "Morningtime" | 2012 | Meridian | |
| "Namesake" | 2013 | & | |
| "Need" | 2014 | Mixtape Two | |
| "Need 2" | 2014 | Mixtape Two | |
| "Neighbor" | 2020 | Marigold | |
| "New Friends" | 2014 | Everything So Far | |
| "No Drugs" (Note: Demo version available on an expanded edition of Marigold.) | 2020 | Marigold | |
| "Old Friends" | 2016 | Cardinal | |
| "On Jet Lag" | 2010 | Mixtape One | |
| "Orange" | 2021 | 11:11 | |
| "Over My Shoulder" | 2012 | Meridian | |
| "Overthrown" | 2014 | Mixtape Two | |
| "Palisade" | 2012 | Meridian | |
| "Paterson & Leo" (Note: Song was later re-recorded for Skylight.) | 2018 | Skylight | |
| "Peeling Off the Bark" | 2012 | Meridian | |
| "Phase" | 2020 | Marigold | |
| "Portal" | 2018 | Skylight | |
| "Problems" (Note: An additional recording of this song was released as a non-album single in 2015.) | 2014 | Mixtape Two | |
| "Recycling" (Note: Song was later re-recorded for Meridian.) | 2010 | Mixtape One | |
| "Respirate" | 2022 | 11:11 | |
| "Rings" | 2018 | Skylight | |
| "Rose" (Note: "Rose" was uploaded only to the band's SoundCloud in 2012; it is not available on any other platforms.) | 2012 | Non-album single | |
| "Size of the Moon" (Note: Song later re-recorded for Cardinal.) | 2014 | Mixtape Two | |
| "Skylight" | 2018 | Skylight | |
| "So What" | 2022 | 11:11 | |
| "Spiral" | 2020 | Marigold | |
| "Sunday" | 2012 | Meridian | |
| "Swimming" | 2020 | 11:11 | |
| "Thanksgiving" | 2018 | Skylight | |
| "The Alarmist" | 2020 | Marigold | |
| "The Metronome" (Note: Song was later re-recorded for Meridian.) | 2010 | Mixtape One | |
| "Then Again" | 2016 | Cardinal | |
| "Unison" | 2013 | & | |
| "V" | 2013 | & | |
| "Visiting" | 2016 | Cardinal | |
| "Waveform" (Note: Demo version available on an expanded edition of Cardinal.) | 2016 | Cardinal | |
