= Pinegrove on Audiotree Live =

Live album by Pinegrove
- Released: May 27, 2016
- Recorded: April 30, 2016
- Studio: Audiotree (Chicago, Illinois)
- Genre: Americana; indie rock
- Length: 27:45
- Label: Audiotree Music

Pinegrove chronology
Cardinal (2016)	Pinegrove on Audiotree Live (2016)	Elsewhere (2017)

Pinegrove on Audiotree Live is the first live album by American rock band Pinegrove, released May 27, 2016 on Audiotree Music. The group, which formed in 2010, developed a following with their mix of Americana and emo. The performance was filmed and released through Audiotree, a Chicago, Illinois–based music company.

== Background ==
Audiotree, an American record label and music discovery platform, was founded in Chicago, Illinois in 2011. The company became known for its high-quality videos of live performances, mainly from independent musicians. Its associated YouTube channel became a popular destination for indie music fans in the 2010s. Forbes writer Melissa Daniels reports that, like all Audiotree performances, it was not further mixed in post-production; "what you hear is real," she wrote.

Pinegrove on Audiotree Live was filmed and recorded at the company's Chicago studio space on April 30, 2016. The group were interviewed by a host, though these segments were omitted from the streaming release. At the time, the quintet were in the midst of a national tour supporting the emo act Into It. Over It. Daniels noted the band were considered "breakout indie stars" at the time of their appearance.

Pinegrove frontman Evan Stephens Hall later discussed the performance:

When we recorded Audiotree, I didn’t understand that it was gonna go on our Spotify. I didn’t think people were going to consider that an official release. I just saw it as another in-studio session, which I was excited to do. And it came at the very end of a seven-week tour. I was exhausted on that particular morning and was sort of upset about something personal, and I tried to bring it, but at the end of the set, I was just like, "Alright, we’re going to Thalia Hall or wherever we played that night in Chicago." I really had no idea that it would be a thing at all, and I’m happy that it is.

== Reception ==
Sam Sodomsky of Pitchfork described it as "legendary," and "tailor-made for introducing new fans to the band." Hall has noted that the performance introduced many fans to the band for the first time.

== Track listing ==
All tracks are written by Evan Stephens Hall.

No.	Title	Length
1.	"Need 2"	3:09
2.	"Problems"	1:24
3.	"Cadmium"	3:55
4.	"Size of the Moon"	4:12
5.	"Angelina"	1:27
6.	"&"	4:00
7.	"Recycling"	4:29
8.	"Aphasia"	5:09
Total length:		27:45

== Personnel ==
- Evan Stephens Hall – vocals, guitar
- Josh Marre – guitar, backing vocals
- David Mitchell – bass
- Zack Levine – drums, backing vocals
