= Old Friends (Pinegrove song) =

Single by Pinegrove

from the album Cardinal
- Released: January 5, 2016
- Genre: Americana; indie rock
- Length: 3:28
- Label: Run for Cover
- Songwriter: Evan Stephens Hall

Pinegrove singles chronology
"New Friends" (2015)	"Old Friends" (2016)	"Cadmium" (2016)

"Old Friends" is a song recorded by American rock band Pinegrove. The song was released on January 5, 2016, through Run for Cover Records, as the lead single from the band's second studio album Cardinal. It was written by singer-songwriter Evan Stephens Hall; lyrically, the song focuses on past friendships, as well as change.

== Background ==
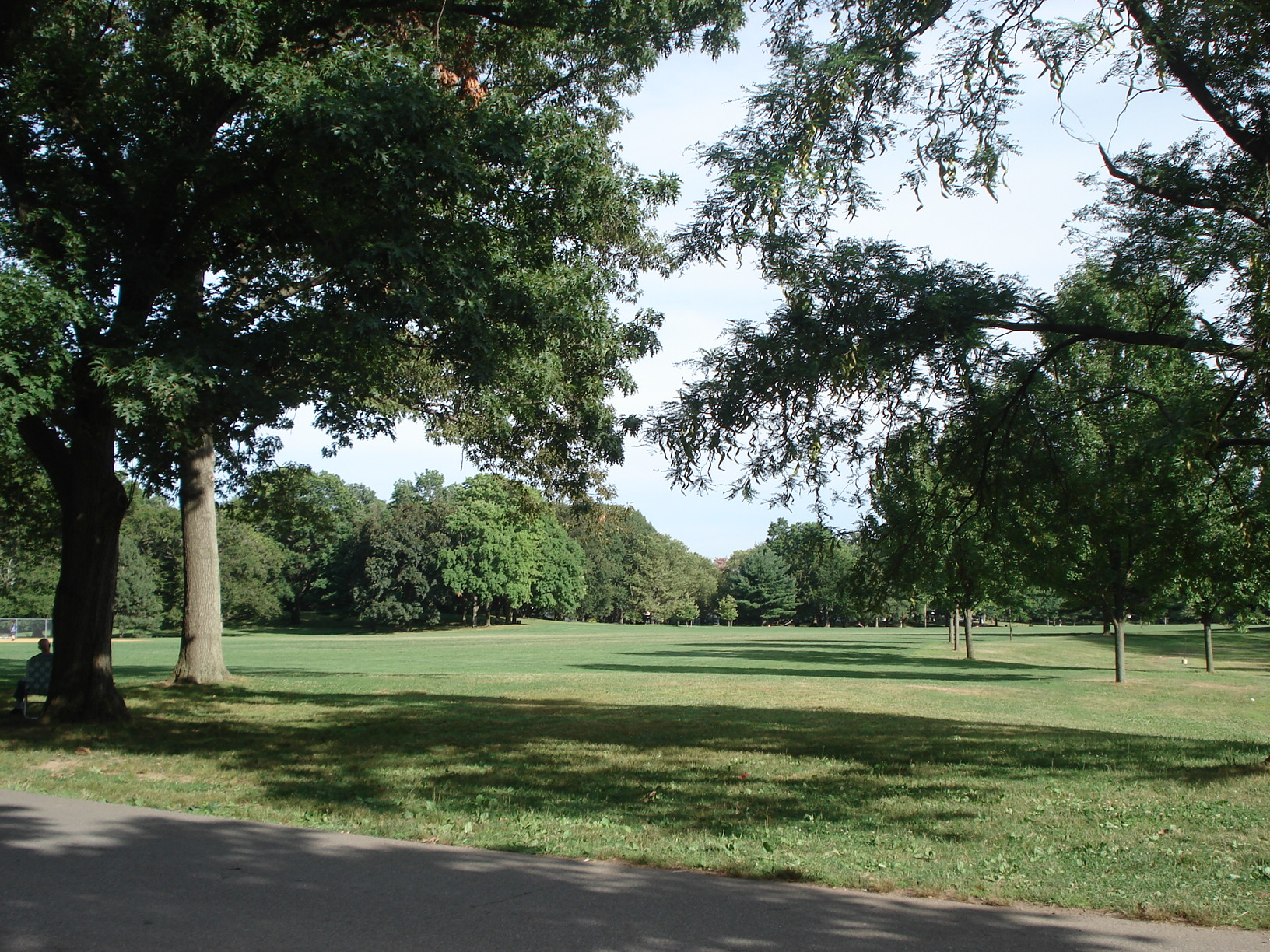
"Old Friends" was inspired by Evan Stephens Hall's walks around Brookdale Park in Montclair, New Jersey.

"Old Friends" was penned by Pinegrove frontman Evan Stephens Hall, who also performs the breadth of its instrumentation; on the track, he sings, plays guitar, percussion, banjo, keyboards, bass, and is credited with its recording and mixing. Alongside Hall, the band's other members, Nick and Zack Levine, add guitar and drums; both are credited with recording and mixing as well. In addition, Mike Levine, Nick and Zack's father, contributes lap steel guitar to the song. Hall stated in an interview that the song was developed between 2012 and 2014. Quinn Moreland, writing for Pitchfork, considered its sound as redolent of Wilco's early music.

In context with Cardinal, "Old Friends" opens the album and is thematically connected to its final track, "New Friends". Both songs center on friendship; Moreland called the companion songs "odes to the fluctuating relationships that come with young adulthood." It was, like much of Cardinal, inspired by evening walks around Brookdale Park in his hometown of Montclair, New Jersey; the song's opening lyrics detail its "familiar sidewalk cracks and dogwood trees." The lyrics are fictional, but "deeply" connected to Hall's experiences. In an interview, Hall considered the song to have "an element of staying the same while everything around you changes and wanting to be adaptable but also being a little stubborn about it."

== Release and reception ==
"Old Friends" debuted as a live acoustic rendition, recorded for Philadelphia-based Schuylkill Sessions and released online in July 2015. The studio version of the track premiered on Stereogum, an online music magazine, on January 5, 2016; in addition, the post announced the band's second album, Cardinal.

Timothy Monger, reviewing Cardinal for AllMusic, complimented the song's "easygoing" tone and "affable melody." Moreland, writing for Pitchfork, praised the song's heartfelt message, and its line "between melancholy and optimism." Collin Brennan at Consequence of Sound too praised this duality, extolling the song as a "gem": "it bears listening to with the volume turned all the way up," he wrote. Spin's Colin Joyce felt the song's abstract observations conceal its "heartbreaking" realization to "call my parents when I think of them" and "tell my friends when I love them." James Rettig, writing for Stereogum in the song's premiere post, compared its lyricism to Taylor Swift ("by way of, like, Built to Spill"), and suggested the song "takes on how stifling it can be to be tethered to your past, but how worthwhile those long-term connections can feel."

The song has been covered by singer-songwriter Kevin Devine.

== Personnel ==
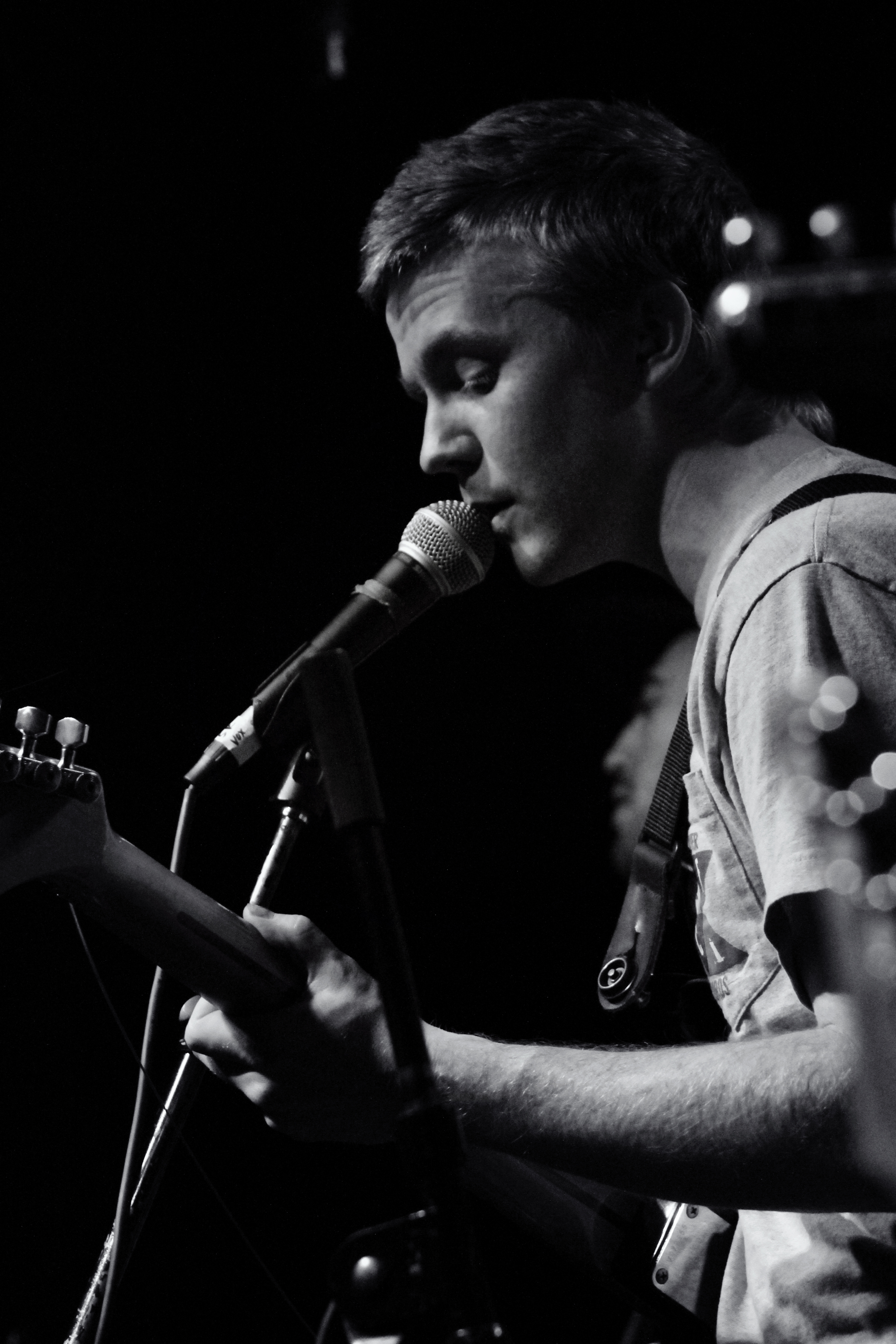
Evan Stephens Hall, the band's frontman and singer-songwriter, performing in 2016.

Credits adapted from Cardinal's liner notes.

Pinegrove

- Evan Stephens Hall – guitar, vocals, percussion, banjo, keys, bass, songwriting, recording, mixing
- Nick Levine – guitar, recording, mixing assistance
- Zack Levine – drums, recording, mixing assistance

Additional personnel

- Sam Skinner – recording, mixing
- Nandi Rose Plunkett – vocals
- Mike Levine – pedal steel

Production

- Seth Engel – additional recording
- Greg Calbi – mastering engineer
- Steve Fallone – additional mastering
