= Phase (Pinegrove song) =

Single by Pinegrove

from the album Marigold
- Released: October 30, 2019
- Recorded: May 2018–February 2019
- Studio: Amperland (Kinderhook, New York)
- Genre: Americana; indie rock
- Length: 2:31
- Label: Rough Trade
- Songwriter: Evan Stephens Hall
- Producers: Evan Stephens Hall; Sam Skinner

Pinegrove singles chronology
"Moment" (2019)	"Phase" (2019)	"The Alarmist" (2020)

"Phase" is a song recorded by American rock band Pinegrove. The song was released on October 30, 2019 through Rough Trade Records, as the second single from the band's fourth studio album Marigold (2020). It was written by singer-songwriter Evan Stephens Hall; lyrically, the song examines insomnia and anxiety.

It became their first song to chart, peaking at number 34 on Billboard's Adult Alternative Songs listing in 2020. It was also their first true music video, which depicts sleepwalking.

== Background ==
"Phase" focuses on the inability to fall asleep, and struggling with intrusive thoughts. The song's release was accompanied by a statement from Hall:

“The song Phase' is more or less about insomnia — trying to sleep but things racing in your mind, looking around your room, looking at things from the perspective of your bed, seeing all the things you could do or should be doing, enumerating tasks, making lists in your head, moving through anxieties & eventually, hopefully, into sleep.

Its music video was directed by Colin Read. In the clip, a man sleepwalks through the streets of Manhattan and steals a buskers' guitar before interrupting a band rehearsal.

== Release and reception ==
"Phase" debuted in live concerts by the band; the studio rendition of the track premiered accompanying an announcement of Marigold on October 30, 2019.

Jon Caramanica of The New York Times interpreted its at times apathetic lyricism a reflection of the band's difficult chapter regarding Hall's accusation of sexual coercion. Hayden Goodridge, writing for Paste, considered it a return to form creatively, while also complimenting its slide guitar playing. Jon Young of Consequence of Sound found it among the better tracks on Marigold, enjoying its "rousing" and "tender" tone.

== Personnel ==
Credits adapted from Marigold's liner notes.

Pinegrove

- Evan Stephens Hall - guitar, vocals, percussion, piano, production
- Zack Levine - drums, vocals, percussion, mixing

Additional personnel

- Josh Marré — bass guitar, guitar, lap steel guitar, vocals
- Nick Levine — guitar, pedal steel guitar, baritone guitar, vocals, mixing
- Sam Skinner - guitar, synthesizer, production, mixing
- Nandi Rose Plunkett - vocals, piano, synthesizer
- Mike Levine - pedal steel
- Doug Hall — piano, vocals

== Charts ==
Chart (2020)	Peak position
US Adult Alternative Airplay (Billboard)	34
