= Need 2 =

Single by Pinegrove

from the album Mixtape Two Everything So Far
- Released: May 29, 2014
- Genre: Folk rock; indie rock
- Length: 3:11
- Label: Run for Cover
- Songwriter: Evan Stephens Hall
- Producer: Evan Stephens Hall

"Need 2" is a song recorded by the American rock band Pinegrove. The song was first released on May 29, 2014, and later re-released as a single on June 15, 2023.

== Background ==
"Need 2" was performed, recorded, and co-mixed by Evan Stephens Hall, the chief force behind Pinegrove. In 2014, the band had released one album and several extended plays, including &, which caught the ear of a listener in Canada. This fan contacted Hall to suggest releasing a cassette of the EP, with a brand-new EP encompassing side two. Hall challenged himself to write another series of songs with the same runtime, leading to the development of "Need 2". The song opens with a field recording of birds before segueing into a droning, despondent guitar riff. In a Reddit r/IAmA, Hall mentions his satisfaction with the original recording, which was made in his bedroom, noting that while other songs in their catalogue have been re-interpreted over time, "Need 2" gets it right. In the same thread, he reveals the song is a mediation on songwriting itself; he expanded on the song's influences in a Rolling Stone piece some time later:

"I was just sort of bummed out, spaced out, bored, those classic early-Green Day tropes. And then, too, this is really a song about songwriting, ultimately, and just trying to spur myself on. [...] I was also reading a lot of Lydia Davis at the time, who’s known for flash fiction, I guess you could say, or prose poetry. So I was interested in writing songs that just had a single idea in them. And there are few lyrics in this song. It's pretty much just like, 'OK, and here I am, a human on this Earth; everything's a little bit fucked right now, and yet I am compelled to make things. Why is that? Isn't that strange? Why do I seem to need to?'"

"Need 2" debuted as a part of that digital EP, Mixtape Two, first self-released on Bandcamp on May 29, 2014. At the time, Hall aimed to be conversational in his lyricism, more direct and to-the-point than concerned with interlocking themes, as in his past work. With Mixtape Two, he said: "That was a real turning point. It allowed me to move towards simplicity. Because complexity is a little bit of a defense mechanism." "Need 2" was later included as a part of the band's early-career compilation, Everything So Far, first self-released on CD-R and cassette in 2014 and later widely released through Run for Cover in 2015.

== Release and reception ==
Jeff Ihaza from Rolling Stone viewed the song as "palpably moody".

The song was the subject of a viral TikTok dance in 2023 dubbed the "Pinegrove Shuffle". In the aftermath of the song's exposure, the band uploaded a lyric video of the song to YouTube, edited by Rena Johnson; they also released a digital single of the song with three different versions of the song (a slow version, a sped-up version, and a "hyperspeed" version), owing to a larger TikTok trend of uptempo remixes of popular songs.

== Personnel ==
Credits adapted from Mixtape Two on Bandcamp.

Pinegrove

- Evan Stephens Hall – guitar, vocals, songwriting, production, mixing

Production

- Nick Levine – mixing
- Zack Levine – mixing
- Sam Skinner – mixing, mastering

== Charts ==
=== Weekly charts ===
Weekly chart performance for "Need 2"
Chart (2023)	Peak position
US Hot Rock & Alternative Songs (Billboard)	12

=== Year-end charts ===
Year-end chart performance for "Need 2"
Chart (2023)	Position
US Hot Rock & Alternative Songs (Billboard)	62

== Certifications ==
Region	Certification	Certified units/sales
United Kingdom (BPI)	Silver	200,000^{‡}
^{‡} Sales+streaming figures based on certification alone.
