= Cadmium (song) =

Single by Pinegrove

from the album Cardinal
- Released: January 27, 2016
- Genre: Americana; indie rock
- Length: 4:12
- Label: Run for Cover
- Songwriter: Evan Stephens Hall

Pinegrove singles chronology
"Old Friends" (2016)	"Cadmium" (2016)	"Size of the Moon (Live)" (2017)

"Cadmium" is a song recorded by the American rock band Pinegrove. It was released on January 27, 2016, by Run for Cover Records, as the second single from the band's second studio album, Cardinal. It was written by the singer-songwriter Evan Stephens Hall.

== Background ==
"Cadimum" was written by Pinegrove's frontman, Evan Stephens Hall, who also sings, plays the guitar and adds percussion to the track. Alongside Hall, siblings Nick and Zack Levine contribute vocals, guitar and drums, while Adan Carlo Feliciano played bass guitar. Hall, Nick, Zack and Sam Skinner are credited with recording the material; all assisted in mixing as well.

"Cadmium" was inspired by the book I Send You This Cadmium Red by John Berger and John Christie, which includes a scene in which one character sends a letter simply composed of a square. Hall at that time was sending letters to a friend on the West Coast, and they eventually began exchanging shapes instead of words. The cover art of Cardinal, as well as several lyrics on the album, refer to the color, either directly or by metaphor, most notably in "Cadmium".

== Release and reception ==
Run for Cover issued "Cadmium" as the second single from Cardinal on January 27, 2016.

Ian Cohen at Pitchfork considered "Cadmium" as indicative of the album's overarching themes, specifically, "the failure of words to express what [Hall's character] really wants". James Rettig at Stereogum was positive in his impression of the single, writing, "Hall's revelations about communication are met with crisp affirmations from the rest of his band; each time the music drops out sounds like a step on the path to aligning what you say and how you feel." Jessica Goodman of The Line of Best Fit described the "cathartic" tune as a "twanging, chiming, pleading anthem".

== Personnel ==
Credits adapted from Cardinal's liner notes.

Pinegrove

- Evan Stephens Hall – guitar, vocals, percussion, songwriting, recording, mixing
- Zack Levine – drums, recording, mixing assistance

Additional personnel

- Adan Carlo Feliciano – bass guitar
- Nandi Rose Plunkett – vocals
- Nick Levine – guitar, recording, mixing assistance
- Sam Skinner – recording, mixing

Production

- Seth Engel – additional recording
- Greg Calbi – mastering engineer
- Steve Fallone – additional mastering
