= Cadmium (disambiguation) =

Cadmium is a chemical element with the symbol Cd and atomic number 48.

Cadmium may also refer to:

- Cadmium (album), album by Sky
- "Cadmium" (song), song by Pinegrove
- Cadmia (Latin for cadmium), an alchemical substance

== See also ==
- Cd (disambiguation)
