= Skylight (Pinegrove album) =

2018 indie rock album

Studio album by Pinegrove
- Released: September 28, 2018
- Genre: Americana, indie rock
- Length: 30:14
- Label: Self-released
- Producer: Evan Stephens Hall, Sam Skinner

Pinegrove chronology
Elsewhere (2017)	Skylight (2018)	Marigold (2020)

Skylight is the third studio album by Pinegrove, self-released on September 28, 2018. The album was produced by the band's frontman, singer-songwriter Evan Stephens Hall, as well as guitarist Sam Skinner. It was recorded at a home the band lived in in upstate New York in mid-2017. Pinegrove had risen to fame on the heels of its sophomore record, Cardinal, released on independent label Run for Cover. In November 2017, Hall posted a statement on the band's Facebook detailing accusations of "sexual coercion" against him. In response, the band canceled a tour and the planned release of Skylight, entering a hiatus.

The album eventually saw release with little promotion in September 2018 on Bandcamp. It was self-released by the band as they had split from Run for Cover during the interim. Skylight received positive reviews from contemporary music critics. Though initially exclusive to streaming platforms, the album was released physically in February 2019. Its LP release was bundled with an additional disc containing an acoustic rendition of the album, dubbed Skylight II.

== Background ==
Pinegrove formed in 2010 in Montclair, New Jersey. The group, fronted by singer-songwriter Evan Stephens Hall, spent their early years performing at DIY shows and self-releasing their music. The group signed to the independent label Run for Cover in 2015, which re-released their initial material as Everything So Far. Their debut album, Cardinal, arrived in early 2016, and received acclaim from music critics. In the following year, the band's stardom grew as they toured extensively and headlined festivals such as the Newport Folk Festival. By mid-2017, the band were working on new music, which became Skylight. The album was recorded in Kinderhook, New York at a home where the band lived at the time. The band promoted the new album with the release of the lead single "Intrepid" that November.

Later that month, Hall posted a message on the band's Facebook regarding an allegation against him of "sexual coercion". The letter came at the height of the Me Too movement, and Hall announced the band would take an immediate hiatus, canceling a planned tour and the release of Skylight. More information regarding the band surfaced in a September 2018 feature on Pitchfork, which announced the impending release of Skylight two days later. Keyboardist Nandi Rose Plunkett exited the band during this period to focus on her project Half Waif.

== Release and reception ==
Professional ratings
Review scores
Source	Rating
AllMusic	4/5 stars
Pitchfork	7.5/10

Skylight was released on Bandcamp on September 28, 2018, with profits initially going to various charities, including Musicares, the American Foundation for Suicide Prevention, and the Voting Rights Project. It became available on streaming services several days after, and was released physically on compact disc, cassette, and vinyl in February 2019. Pinegrove self-released Skylight, and parted ways with Run for Cover Records, which had initially planned to release the album prior to Hall's announcement. Spin's Nina Corcoran noted the album arrived with little promotion, writing, "In effect, one must go out of one’s way to find this album, or even to know it exists at all."

Skylight received positive reviews. Corcoran praised the album as lyrically dense, commenting, "Skylight showcases Pinegrove's growth as musicians and the significant steps they’ve taken to hone their sound." Uproxx's Philip Cosores considered it a more mature offering than its predecessor, while noting that "it's a record that’s inherent strength could have easily catapulted the band to the next level of their career had the circumstances surrounding it been different." Pitchfork's Quinn Moreland gave the album a 7.5 out of 10, writing that the album "focuses on atmosphere and abstraction [...] these 11 songs move patiently and often disregard verse-chorus song structures in favor of loose vignettes." Timothy Monger at AllMusic characterized Skylight as a "beautifully written and wholly engaging successor to Cardinal, building on that album's searching emotional tone with sharper songwriting and curious allusions to deep self-reflection and bettering one's path which, in hindsight, seems to address the issue that blocked its path to release."

== Track listing ==
Skylight I

All tracks are written by Evan Stephens Hall

No.	Title	Length
1.	"Rings"	3:54
2.	"Portal"	2:28
3.	"Intrepid"	3:30
4.	"Paterson & Leo"	2:08
5.	"Angelina"	1:37
6.	"Thanksgiving"	1:05
7.	"Easy Enough"	2:01
8.	"Darkness"	4:33
9.	"Skylight"	4:19
10.	"Amulets"	1:00
11.	"Light On"	3:38
Total length:		30:14

Skylight II

No.	Title	Length
1.	"Rings Acoustic"	4:10
2.	"Portal Acoustic"	2:23
3.	"Intrepid Acoustic"	3:28
4.	"Paterson & Leo Acoustic"	1:35
5.	"Angelina Acoustic"	1:37
6.	"Thanksgiving Acoustic"	1:09
7.	"Easy Enough Acoustic"	2:13
8.	"Darkness Acoustic"	4:30
9.	"Skylight Acoustic"	5:04
10.	"Amulets Acoustic"	1:12
11.	"Light On Acoustic"	3:29
Total length:		30:51

== Personnel ==
Musicians

- Evan Stephens Hall - guitar, vocals, percussion
- Nick Levine - guitar, pedal steel
- Zack Levine - drums, percussion
- Josh Marré - guitar, dobro, lap steel, vocals
- Sam Skinner - guitar
- Nandi Rose Plunkett - synth, keyboard, vocals
- Adan Carlo Feliciano - bass
- Doug Hall - piano & vocals on Light On

Production

- Engineering - Sam Skinner with Pinegrove
- Mixing - Sam Skinner, Evan Stephens Hall, Zack Levine
- Producer - Evan Stephens Hall, Sam Skinner
- Mastered - Greg Calbi at Sterling Sound
- Cover art - Evan Stephens Hall

== Charts ==
Chart (2018)	Peak position
US Heatseekers Albums (Billboard)	15
US Independent Albums (Billboard)	38
