= Meridian (album) =

Studio album by Pinegrove
- Released: February 29, 2012
- Genre: Indie rock, alternative country, math rock
- Length: 34:12
- Label: Self-released
- Producer: Evan Stephens Hall; Sam Skinner

Pinegrove chronology
Mixtape One (2010)	Meridian (2012)	& (2013)

Meridian is the debut studio album by American rock band Pinegrove, self-released on February 29, 2012. Pinegrove, formed in Montclair, New Jersey two years earlier, spent its early years self-recording its music at home. Meridian offers eight songs, including fan favorite "Recycling", that showcase its mix of alternative country and emo. All of its contents were composed by the band's frontman, singer-songwriter Evan Stephens Hall. He and drummer Zack Levine founded the group. Meridian also features contributions from occasional band members Nick Levine, Aidan Feliciano, and Nandi Rose Plunkett.

The album received positive responses from the small following the band had developed. The LP was later repurposed into the band's 2014 compilation Everything So Far, which serves as an anthology of the group's early work.

== Background ==
Pinegrove was formed in 2010 in Montclair, New Jersey by singer-songwriter Evan Stephens Hall and drummer Zack Levine. The group spent its early years performing DIY concerts in basements while self-booking small tours, and uploading its music to online platform Bandcamp. "In those days we'd finish up a project & put it up on bandcamp that night," Hall said later. Its first release, Mixtape One, was released in January 2010.

Most of the material present on Meridian was, like all early material, recorded at home in Montclair. Hall wrote much of the material from an autofictional perspective, as though he were conversing with a future version of himself, encouraging himself to overcome struggle, or issues he was working through. The album contains two fan favorites, "The Metronome" and "Recycling", both of which remain staples of the band's live setlist while most others have since been retired. K.C. Libman, writing for the Phoenix New Times, calls it an album "full of bleating pleas over lush and intricate instrumentals." The group issued a pre-release single, "Over My Shoulder", on November 27, 2011.

== Composition ==
Meridian has been categorized as a math rock album. "There are definitely elements of rock, R&B, and maybe sometimes math," Hall confirmed, but suggested that post-country was a better signifier: "I think post-country is exactly the type of music we are trying to make [...] I mainly think I try to write American music. Music that feels like it's from somewhere." In a Reddit AMA, Hall described "The Metronome" as "about liking someone unrequitedly who is also friends with all of your friends." "Mather Knoll" refers to a hillock outside Mather Hall, a dormitory at Kenyon College in Ohio, which Hall attended. "Recycling" takes it name from a recycling plant Hall worked at through college. "Morningtime" references the proverbial "pine grove", a grid of pine trees located on a nature reserve at Kenyon.

== Reception ==
The group uploaded a teaser video to YouTube promoting its impending release on February 15, 2012; it was produced by animator David Masnato and the band. The album debuted on Bandcamp on February 29, 2012, and pressed very limited copies of the album on cassette to sell at shows. "I like cassette as a format because it forces the listener, from sheer inconvenience, to listen to the whole thing, because it’s really such a pain to skip around. So it emphasizes the album format, which I appreciate," Hall said later. In 2014, the group compiled a cassette anthology of early material, Everything So Far, which includes Meridian within its track listing. Everything So Far was issued on vinyl and CD in April 2017, marking the first wide physical release of Meridian.

The group were largely unknown at the time of its release, and few reviews were published. Spin contributor Rachel Brodsky later wrote that the LP was received "breathlessly in their microcosm of listeners." One of its only reviews was on fansite Maimed and Tamed, and a user-submitted review to the website Sputnikmusic, linked to in the aforementioned Spin piece.

== Track listing ==
All tracks are written by Evan Stephens Hall.

Meridian track listing
No.	Title	Length
1.	"Palisade"	3:20
2.	"The Metronome"	3:20
3.	"Mather Knoll"	3:50
4.	"Over My Shoulder"	4:00
5.	"Peeling Off the Bark"	3:58
6.	"Morningtime"	4:53
7.	"Recycling"	4:35
8.	"Sunday"	6:11
Total length:		34:12

== Personnel ==
- Evan Stephens Hall – guitar, vocals
- Nick Levine – guitar
- Zack Levine – drums
- Aidan Feliciano – bass guitar
- Nandi Rose Plunkett – vocals
- Steve Skinner – mastering
