= Everything So Far =

Compilation album by Pinegrove
- Released: 2014
- Recorded: 2010–2014
- Genres: Americana; indie rock
- Length: 74:04
- Labels: Seagreen; Run for Cover

Pinegrove chronology
Mixtape Two (2014)	Everything So Far (2014)	Cardinal (2016)

Everything So Far is the first compilation album by American rock band Pinegrove. It was initially self-released by the band in 2014, and later released on cassette as a tour-only exclusive by Seagreen Records in December 2014. Everything So Far serves as an anthology the band's early material, from self-released extended plays to the band's first proper album, Meridian (originally released in 2012). Following Pinegrove's signing to independent record label Run for Cover, it was re-released with updated cover art on October 9, 2015. It has since seen re-released on vinyl and compact disc.

== Background ==
Pinegrove first issued Everything So Far in 2014. The first edition was a self-released burned CD-R with hand-drawn artwork on each disc, as well as unique cardboard sleeves coated with acrylic paint. The track listing was updated with an additional song, the newly-recorded "Problems", for its December 2014 release on Boston-based cassette label Seagreen, and copies were sold on tour dates during that period. In 2015, Pinegrove signed to Run for Cover, which re-released Everything So Far in October of that year with an altered track listing. In 2017, they re-released it for the first time on vinyl and compact disc, including a 16-page booklet featuring lyrics, photos, and an introductory note by frontman Evan Stephens Hall.

== Reception ==
Professional ratings
Aggregate scores
Source	Rating
Metacritic	74/100
Review scores
Source	Rating
AllMusic	4/5 stars
The Guardian	3/5 stars

Gwilym Mumford at The Guardian considered it a nice introduction to the group, commenting, "As with such completist compilations there’s a fair chunk of filler here, and over time its 21 songs begin to congeal into each other a shade, but as an introduction to the band’s many charms, it’s solid enough." Timothy Monger at Allmusic said that "Ranging from lo-fi rock epics to strummed acoustic numbers that blend lonesome rural tones with desperate suburban ennui, Everything So Far is a testament to a band that sounded original out of the gate."

== Track listing ==
All tracks are written by Evan Stephens Hall.

Everything So Far track listing
No.	Title	Original Release	Length
1.	"New Friends"		3:19
2.	"Angelina"		1:41
3.	"Problems"	Mixtape Two (2014)	1:20
4.	"Need"	Mixtape Two (2014)	1:50
5.	"Overthrown"	Mixtape Two (2014)	1:33
6.	"Size of the Moon"	Mixtape Two (2014)	4:07
7.	"Need 2"	Mixtape Two (2014)	3:11
8.	"Namesake"	& (2013)	3:07
9.	"V"	& (2013)	2:40
10.	"&"	& (2013)	4:03
11.	"Unison"	& (2013)	4:14
12.	"Palisade"	Meridian (2012)	3:20
13.	"The Metronome"	Meridian (2012)	3:20
14.	"Mather Knoll"	Meridian (2012)	3:50
15.	"Over My Shoulder"	Meridian (2012)	4:00
16.	"Peeling Off the Bark"	Meridian (2012)	3:58
17.	"Morningtime"	Meridian (2012)	4:53
18.	"Recycling"	Meridian (2012)	4:35
19.	"Sunday"	Meridian (2012)	6:11
20.	"On Jet Lag"	Mixtape One (2010)	3:36
21.	"Days"	Mixtape One (2010)	4:25
22.	"Untitled"		0:51
Total length:			74:04

== Personnel ==
Adapted from Everything So Far's liner notes.

Pinegrove

- Evan Stephens Hall – guitar, vocals, percussion, cover design, mixing, photography
- Nick Levine – guitar, bass guitar, banjo, cover design, mixing, photography
- Sam Skinner – bass guitar, keyboards, mixing, photography, mastering on tracks 2 to 7
- Zack Levine – drums, percussion, mixing, photography
- Nandi Rose Plunkett – vocals, photography
- Adan Carlo – bass guitar, photography

Additional musicians

- Jane McKendry – additional vocals on "Days"

Production

- Bryan Dubay – additional photography
- Kayla Tamney – additional photography
- Lyndsey Matoushek – additional photography
- Doug Hall – mastering on "Days" and "On Jet Lag", additional vocals on "Days"
- Greg Calbi – mastering on "New Friends"
- Steve Fallone – additional mastering on "New Friends"
- Steve Skinner – mastering on tracks 8 to 19

== Charts ==
Chart performance for Everything So Far
Chart (2017–2026)	Peak position
UK Album Downloads (Official Charts)	93
UK Independent Albums Breakers (Official Charts)	15
UK Record Store (Official Charts)	39
UK Vinyl Albums (Official Charts)	40
