= Elsewhere (Pinegrove album) =

Live album by Pinegrove
- Released: January 20, 2017
- Genre: Americana; indie rock
- Length: 30:16
- Label: Run for Cover

Pinegrove chronology
Cardinal (2016)	Elsewhere (2017)	Skylight (2018)

Elsewhere is the second live album by American rock band Pinegrove, released January 20, 2017 on Run for Cover. The album follows their breakout record, Cardinal, which was released a year prior and attracted acclaim from music critics. Pinegrove performed nearly 200 shows in the year between, and celebrated their success with Elsewhere. The group also recorded a session for Audiotree Live, which was released on streaming services as a standalone live release preceding the creation of Elsewhere.

The album was released on Bandcamp, utilizing the platform's name-your-price option. All proceeds are donated to the Southern Poverty Law Center. It was also issued on cassette by Run for Cover, which was released in March 2017.

== Background ==
Elsewhere documents Pinegrove's live performances in 2016, a year in which the band performed nearly 200 concerts. Its recordings are culled from the band's tour with Kevin Devine, Petal, and Julien Baker. On its Bandcamp release page, the band's frontman, Evan Stephens Hall, gave insight into the album's creation:

This release is intended as a thank you letter to everybody who supported us in any way. [...] This tour took us across the United States through the days leading up to the 2016 US election, election day, [and] the aftermath. We felt consequently that it's an especially good time to do what we can to promote love [and] equality. As a small gesture of commitment to the cause, this album is available for free or donation, [and] all profits will be donated to the Southern Poverty Law Center.

The album was released on January 20, 2017, the day of the Inauguration of Donald Trump. The album's title is derived from a lyric in the song "Visiting": "City to city / Montclair and elsewhere."

== Reception ==
Sam Sodomsky of Pitchfork dubbed the release "lovable," writing, "all of Pinegrove's songs feel bigger, tighter, and more controlled, without losing the edge that made them stand out in the first place. More than anything, Elsewhere is a testament to just how good a live band Pinegrove has become." The New York Times's Joe Coscarelli mentioned the album, referring to the band at this period as a "stalwart live act".

== Track listing ==
All tracks are written by Evan Stephens Hall.

No.	Title	Recording date	Length
1.	"Visiting"	Seattle, 11/16/16	3:18
2.	"Angelina"	Pittsburgh, 12/7/16	1:43
3.	"Old Friends"	Boston, 11/29/16	3:45
4.	"Aphasia"	Detroit, 12/1/16	5:21
5.	"Recycling"	Boston, 11/29/16	4:49
6.	"Cadmium"	Nashville, 11/22/16	4:00
7.	"Size of the Moon"	Boston, 11/29/16	4:21
8.	"New Friends"	Seattle, 11/16/16	2:59
Total length:			30:16

== Personnel ==
- Evan Stephens Hall – vocals, guitar
- Nandi Rose Plunkett – vocals, keyboards, percussion
- Josh Marre – guitar, vocals
- Adan Carlo – bass
- Sam Skinner – guitar, mixing, and mastering
- Zack Levine – drums, vocals

Production

- Megan Benavente – recording engineer on tracks 1, 2, 4, 6, 8
- Adam Straus – recording engineer on tracks 3, 5, 7
