= Marigold (Pinegrove album) =

Studio album by Pinegrove
- Released: January 17, 2020
- Recorded: May 2018–February 2019
- Studio: Amperland (Kinderhook, New York)
- Length: 37:29
- Label: Rough Trade
- Producers: Evan Stephens Hall; Sam Skinner

Pinegrove chronology
Skylight (2018)	Marigold (2020)	Amperland, NY (2021)

Singles from Marigold
- 1. "Moment" Released: August 28, 2019; 2. "Phase" Released: October 30, 2019; 3. "The Alarmist" Released: January 14, 2020

Marigold is the fourth studio album by Pinegrove, released through Rough Trade Records on January 17, 2020. The album was produced by the band's frontman, singer-songwriter Evan Stephens Hall, as well as guitarist Sam Skinner. As with the band's previous album, Marigold was recorded and mixed at Amperland, a rural farmhouse occupied by the group in upstate New York.

Marigold is the band's first full-length on Rough Trade, with whom they signed in 2019.

== Background ==
Pinegrove formed in 2010 in Montclair, New Jersey, and rose to prominence in the mid-2010s on the strength of their debut album, Cardinal (2016), as well as its follow-up effort, Skylight (2018). Marigold was recorded between May 2018 to February 2019, and followed for Hall "a period of intense self-reflection". As with its predecessor, the LP was recorded at the band's home studio, Amperland, a rural farmhouse shared by Hall and Nick Levine located in Kinderhook, a town in upstate New York. Pitchfork writer Jenn Pelly called Amperland a "spacious, light-filled house" in a "a small, sleepy country town a few hours north of Manhattan." Writer Mark Moody describes it "the same stone's throw distance from the Hudson River as The Band's Big Pink." A press release accompanying the album's announcement dubbed it an "urgent, multivalent meditation". "The Alarmist", a semi-acoustic song set in 6/8 time, was described by Hall as "the negotiation of space between two people — balancing comfort and closeness with a need for independence." "Moment", likewise, represents "a way of thinking about gratitude in the context of chaos or tedium." "Phase" was inspired by insomnia, and the anxieties and thoughts a person cycles through when unable to sleep. "Alcove" was inspired by a trip to visit Hall's extended family in California. Journalist Kelefa Sanneh describes the penultimate song, "Neighbor", as an allegory for deceased animals, and the closing title track as a "meditative six-minute instrumental [...] during which the band cycles slowly between chords."

The band released "Moment", the album's lead single, and announced their new partnership with Rough Trade, on August 28, 2019. Two months later, the band issued a second single, "Phase", and announced the LP proper and its accompanying tour. Shortly before the album's release, the band released a third advance track, "The Alarmist". In promotion of the album, Pinegrove will embark on a tour across North American in February 2020, accompanied by Lake and Whitney Ballen, followed by a European tour between March and April 2020, alongside Buck Meek and Katy J Pearson.

== Reception ==
Professional ratings
Aggregate scores
Source	Rating
AnyDecentMusic?	7.4/10
Metacritic	76/100
Review scores
Source	Rating
AllMusic	4/5 stars
Clash	8/10
Consequence of Sound	B
Exclaim!	7/10
Mojo	4/5 stars
NME	3/5 stars
Paste	8.1/10
Pitchfork	6.6/10
Rolling Stone	3.5/5 stars
Uncut	8/10

Marigold has received positive notices from contemporary music critics. At Metacritic, which assigns a normalized rating out of 100 to reviews from mainstream critics, the album has an average score of 76 out of 100, which indicates "generally favorable reviews" based on 15 reviews. Mark Moody, reviewing for the magazine Under the Radar, complimented the band's musical progression, calling it Pinegrove's "tightest recorded moments to date on display [...] Marigold unfolds with a feeling of more substance than what came before it." Bud Scoppa of Uncut extolled Marigold as a "vibrantly empathetic experience" aided by its "mournful pedal steel, keening harmonies and thumping analogue rhythms," while Jenny Bulley of Mojo felt it captured the "guileless spirit of mid-'90s alt rock." A Rolling Stone blurb likened the album's sound to the Promise Ring, and praised its "heartwarming" nature. Sanneh, in a profile of the band for The New Yorker, described the LP as "noticeably more stoic," singling out "The Alarmist" for praise.

Timothy Monger from AllMusic observed that Marigold "offers no major surprises or alterations in the band's sound, just quality songwriting and a rather remarkable consistency." Though Jon Young, writing for Consequence of Sound, considered Hall's lyricism self-absorbed, he felt Marigold showcased the group "weaving a lovely tapestry of electric guitars shaded by occasional streaks of alt-country." Reporter Bobby Olivier for NJ.com panned the album, suggesting it sounded "boring" and would be met with "measured appreciation but limited passion." NME contributor Jordan Bassett too found the album "boring," writing that the band's "flashy radicalism [has been] muted into a more subtle, less immediate aesthetic."

== Track listing ==
All tracks are written by Evan Stephens Hall, except "Alcove", written by Evan Stephens Hall with Josh Marré.

Marigold track listing
No.	Title	Length
1.	"Dotted Line"	4:20
2.	"Spiral"	0:56
3.	"The Alarmist"	4:01
4.	"No Drugs"	2:48
5.	"Moment"	3:10
6.	"Hairpin"	3:10
7.	"Phase"	2:30
8.	"Endless"	3:26
9.	"Alcove"	2:47
10.	"Neighbor"	4:11
11.	"Marigold"	6:09
Total length:		37:29

Marigold – Japanese edition (bonus tracks)
No.	Title	Length
12.	"No Drugs" (Skylight Sessions)
13.	"Phase" (Acoustic)

== Personnel ==
- Evan Stephens Hall – guitar, vocals, piano, percussion, production, co-mixing
- Nick Levine – guitar, pedal steel, baritone guitar, vocals, co-mixing
- Zack Levine – drums, vocals, percussion, co-mixing
- Josh Marré – bass guitar, guitar, lap steel, vocals
- Sam Skinner – guitar, synthesizer, production, mixing
- Nandi Rose Plunkett – vocals, piano, synthesizer
- Doug Hall – piano, vocals
- Michael William Levine – pedal steel

== Charts ==
Sales chart performance for Marigold
Chart (2020)	Peak position
Scottish Albums (Official Charts)	53
US Billboard 200	176
US Independent Albums (Billboard)	16
US Top Rock Albums (Billboard)	25

== See also ==
- List of 2020 albums
