= Brookdale Park =

County park in New Jersey

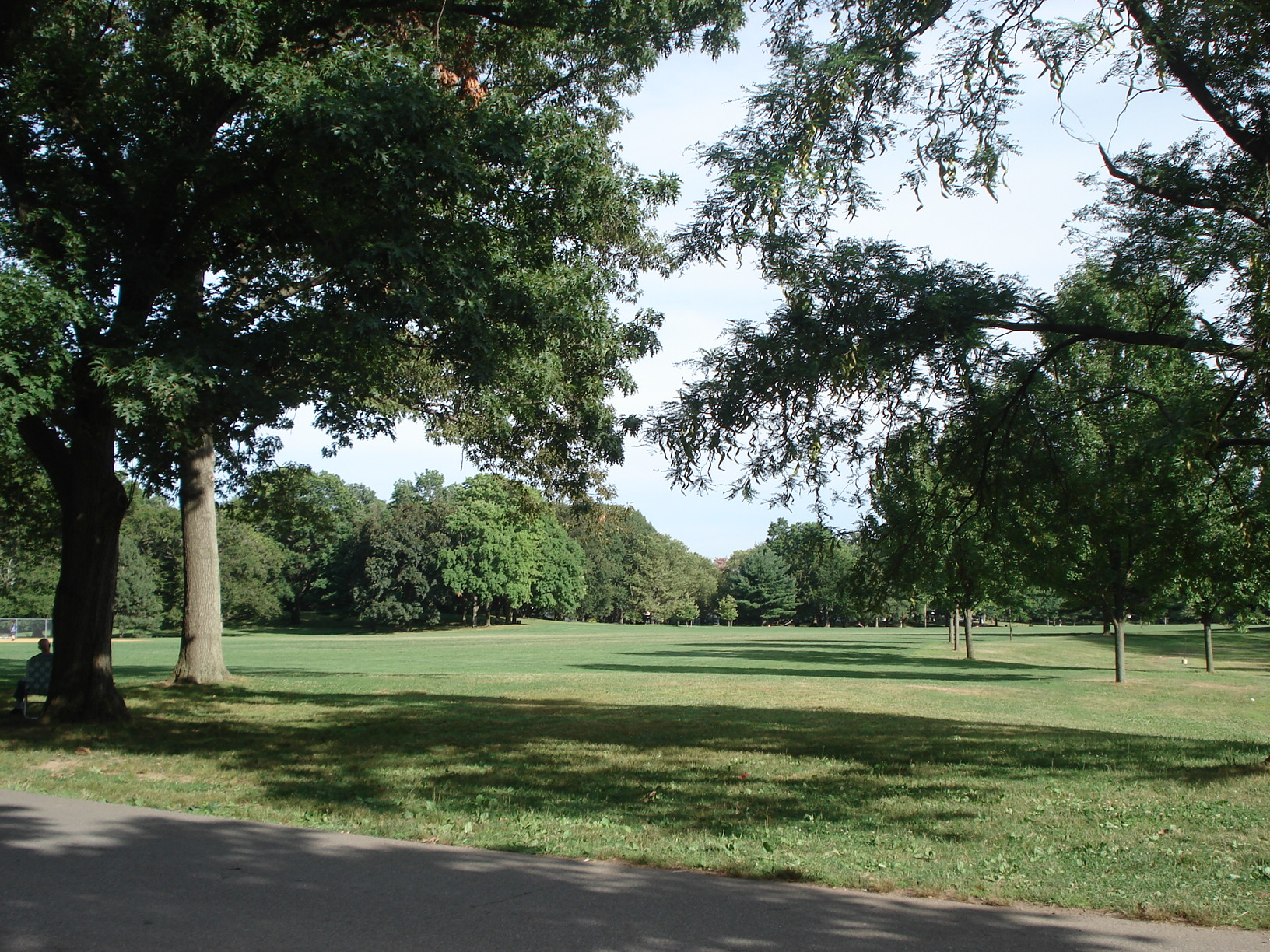
- Brookdale's Meadow
- Interactive map of Brookdale Park
- Type: Public Park
- Location: Montclair, New Jersey, and Bloomfield, New Jersey
- Coordinates: 40.833900°N 74.189200°W
- Area: 121.41 acres (49.13 ha)
- Created: 1931
- Operator: Essex County
- Open: All year
- Parking: Two lots, about 40 spaces each

Brookdale Park is a county park located in the townships of Bloomfield, New Jersey, and Montclair. Designed by the Olmsted Brothers landscape design firm, 78 acres (320,000 m^{2}) are in Bloomfield; Brookdale Park is part of the Essex County park system. It is partially forested and partially lawns, with paths going through.

== Overview ==
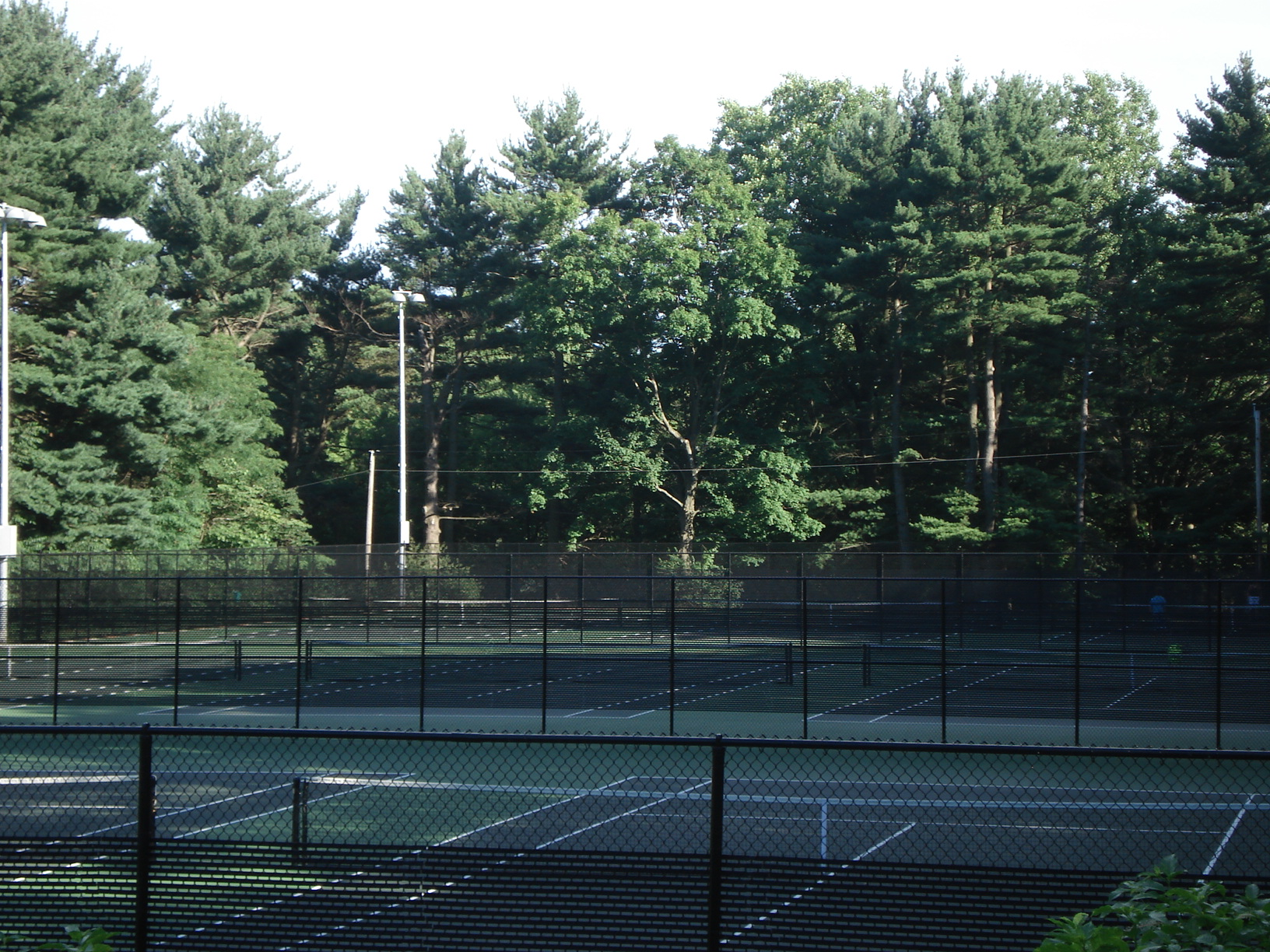
Tennis Courts

Going through the park is a circular, one way road, with three roads leading out of the park. There are many entrances for pedestrians, and there are two parking lots of approximately forty spots each. The road goes around parts of the park that have many athletic fields, park buildings, and other facilities. In the southern end of this area is the great meadow, and on the northern side there are the playgrounds, baseball/softball fields, and the stadium with the grandstand, track, and turf soccer field.

On the outside of the roadway there are many paths through the wood of stately trees that is the western half of the park. This part of the park is mostly in Montclair. Many minor facilities and areas are in the Western half. On this side there is a road entrance, the Rose Garden, the Tennis Courts, and the Dog Park. In the south there is another car entrance. In the northwestern corner there is a smaller field and the Archery range.

== History ==
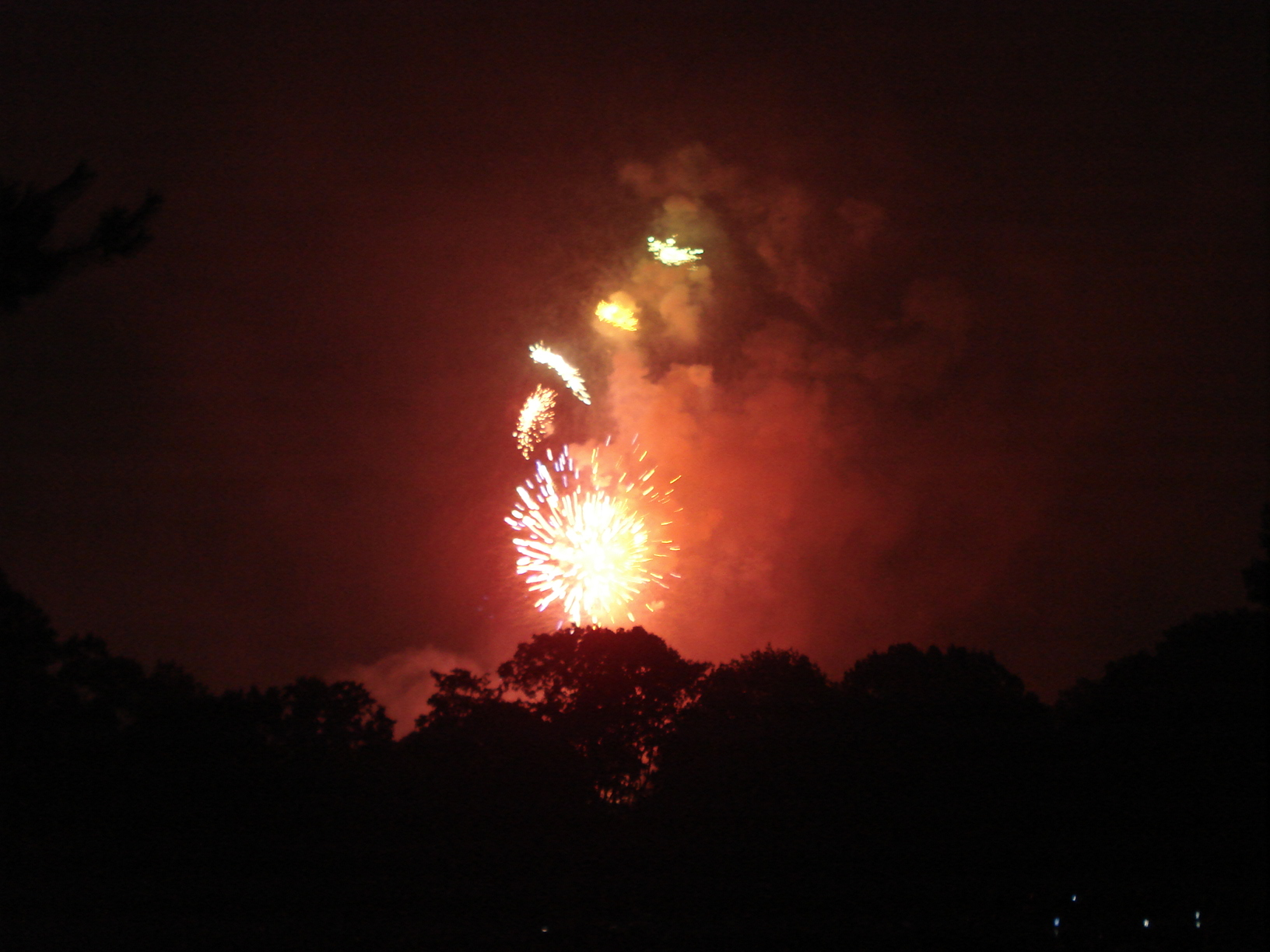
Independence Day fireworks from the Rose Garden

Before Brookdale was a park, the area was used by the First Nations Lenape Native Americans, later known as the Delaware, as a planting/gathering ground. In the late 17th century, Dutch pioneers took over the area, farming rhubarb on it, and put their houses there. This was the beginning of what would grow into Speertown and then be merged with Cranetown to make Montclair. The Brookdale area was originally called Stonehouse Plains by the Dutch.

Land started to be purchased in 1928 and all the land, 121.41 acres (0.4913 km^{2}) in total, were purchased by 1931. The Frederick Law Olmsted Firm was chosen as the firm to design the park, and they completed most of the park by 1930 but the Great Depression slowed work down. It was finished in 1937. This firm is well known for designing much of the National Mall in Washington, D.C., and Central Park in New York City.

Old timers recall the park being the site of the area's coal/wood ash dump. Off Grove Street and down what is now Chester Road, the dirt lane saw horse-drawn ash wagons carrying the discarded ashes and clinkers of coal-burning furnaces collected from homes in the surrounding towns. As coal was replaced by oil and then gas as a heating fuel, the dump became part of the future Essex County park site.

On January 15, 2023 at 11:30 pm, a fatal one-car crash occurred on the downhill left bend of West Circuit Drive. An SUV left the roadway striking a lamp post, an exercise beam and a tree at high speed. Three minors in the car were injured and taken to local hospitals. One boy, 16-year-old Nathan Latifi, died in the accident. All four occupants were students at Glen Ridge High School.

== Amenities ==
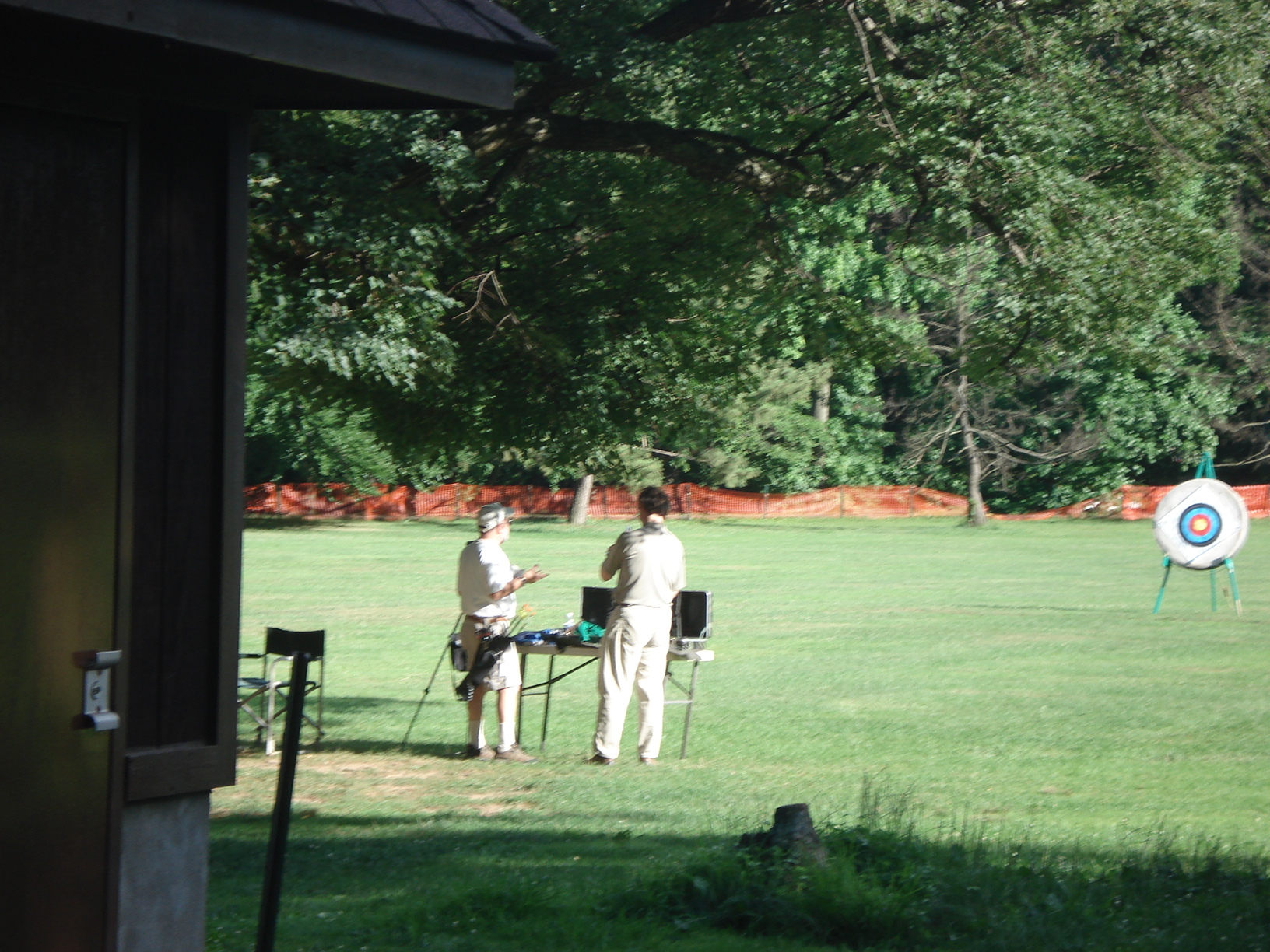
Archery Field and storage house

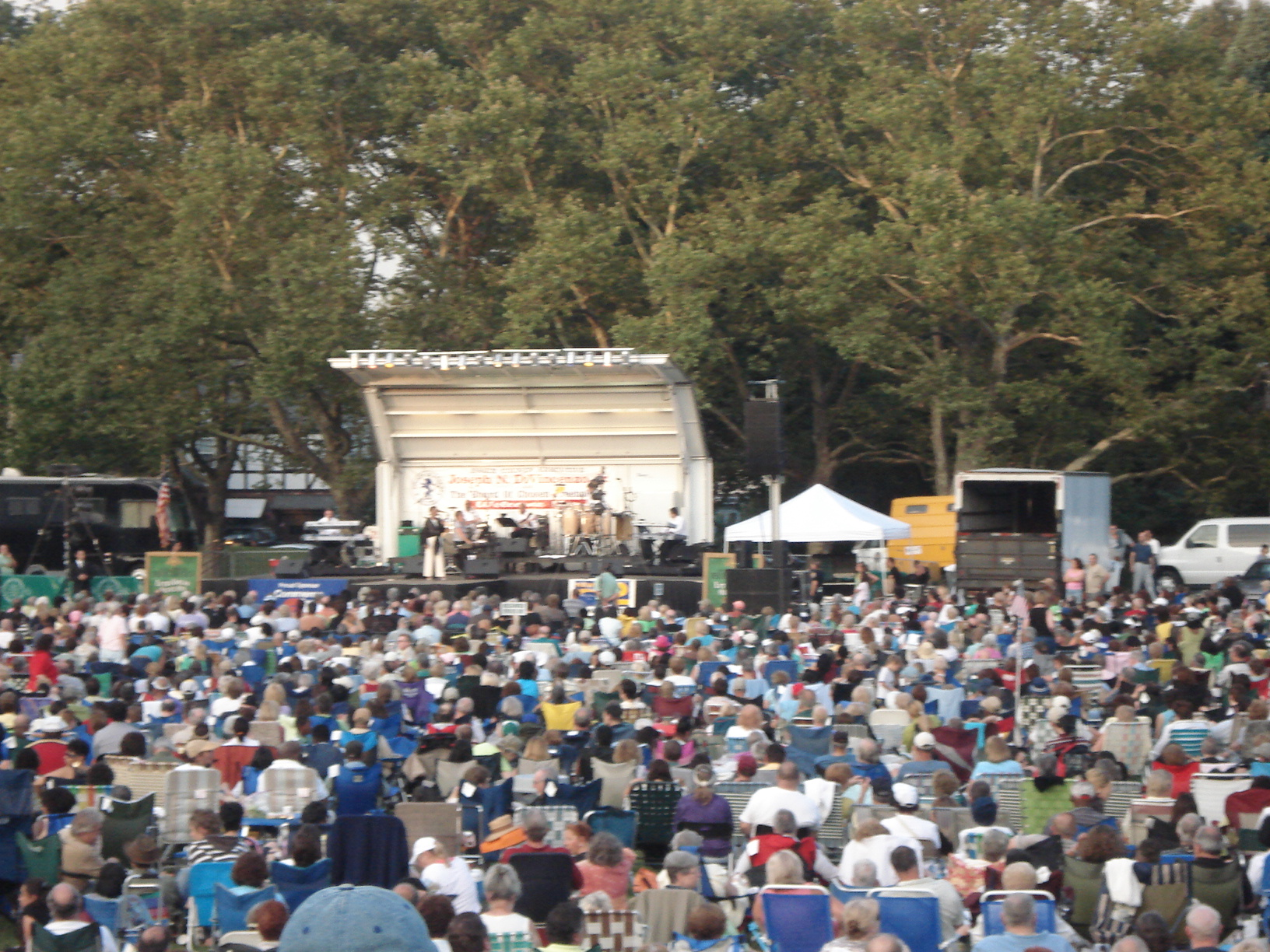
Free Public Concert in Brookdale

- 1½ mile fitness course
- Softball/baseball fields
- Archery field
- Picnic grounds
- Bike and running races
- Grandstand
- Restrooms
- Interpretive trail
- Playgrounds
- Annual arts and crafts festival
- 11 tennis courts
- Formal rose garden with over 100 different species
- Summer concerts and Fourth of July celebrations
- Fireworks displays
- Dog park
- Soccer fields
- A block away from Yantacaw Brook Park
- Mountain bike trail

== Gallery ==
Brookdale Park Gallery

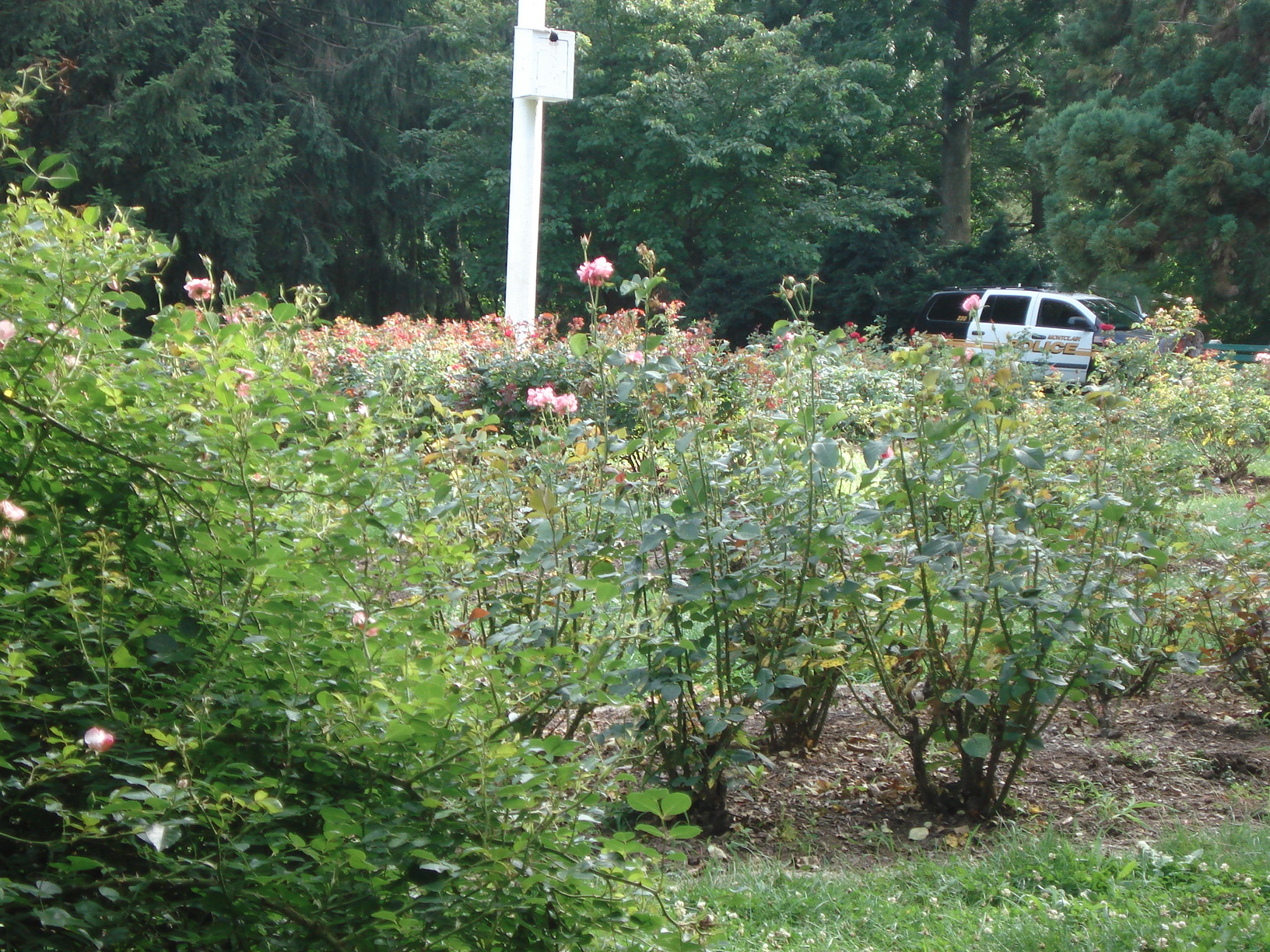
Brookdale Rose Garden

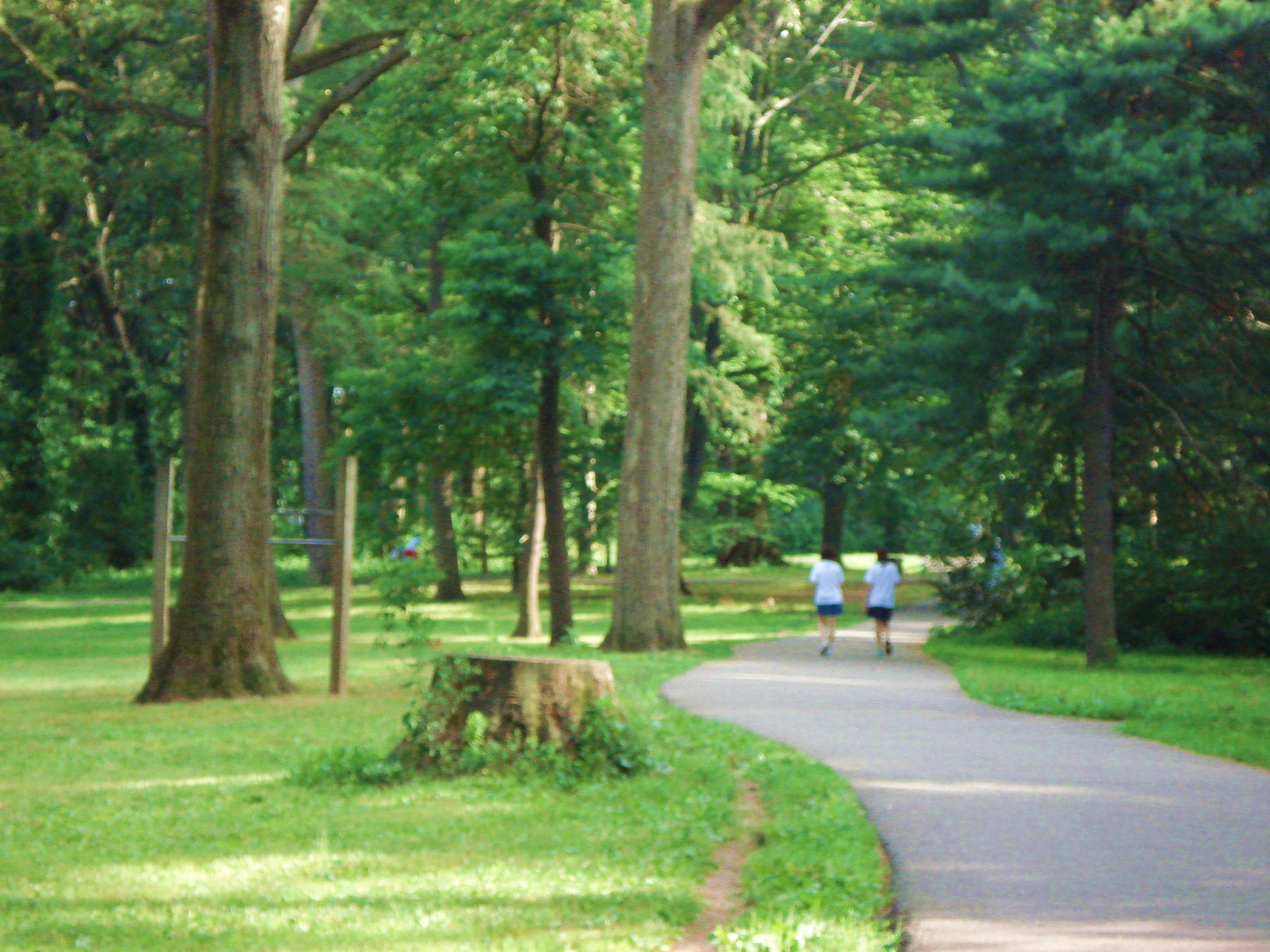
A path around the perimeter of the park

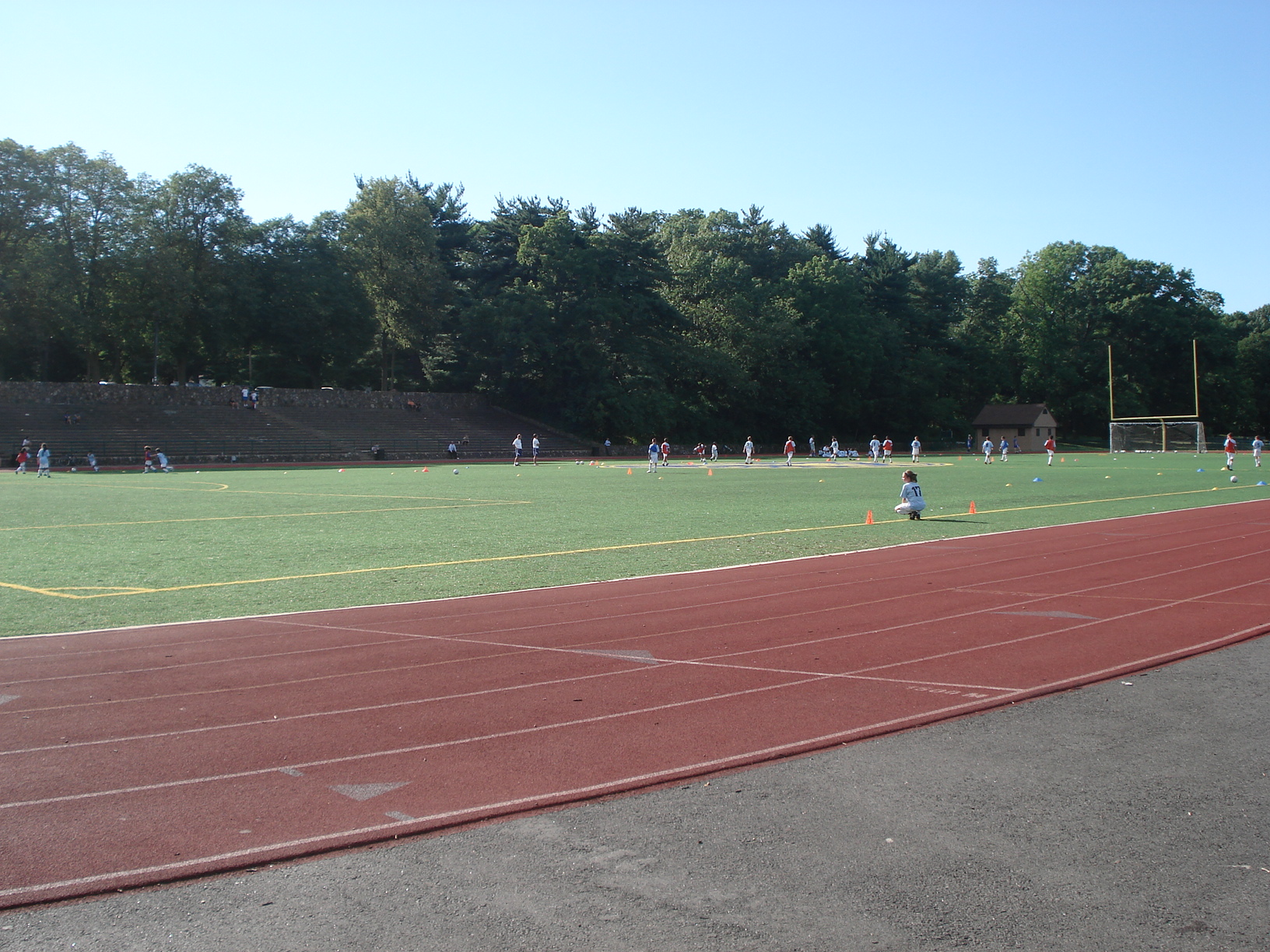
The running track, grand stand, and turf soccer field

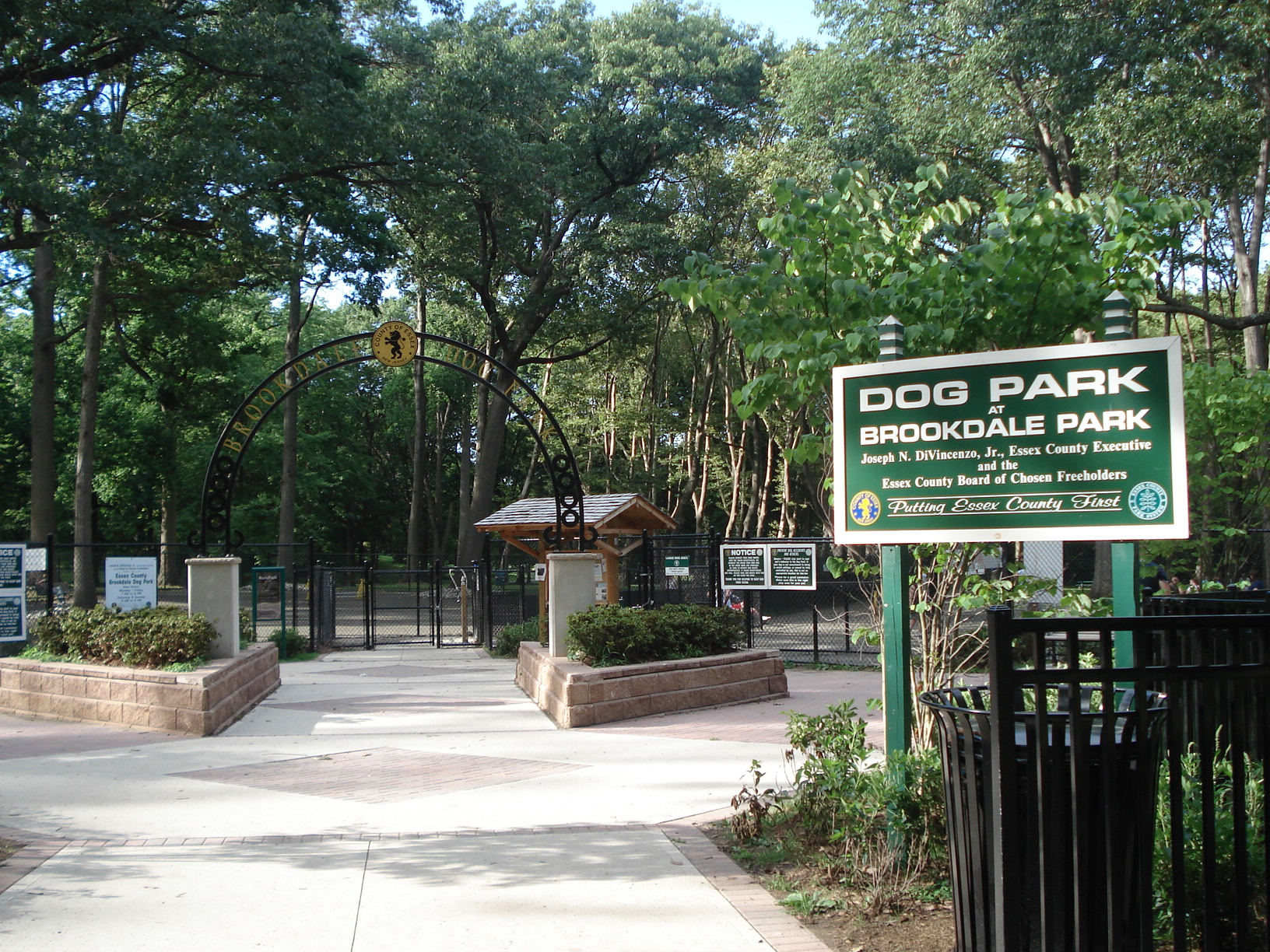
The entrance/waiting area at the dog park

Footnote:
