= Cardinal (Pinegrove album) =

Studio album by Pinegrove
- Released: February 12, 2016
- Genre: Americana; indie rock
- Length: 30:45
- Label: Run for Cover

Pinegrove chronology
Everything So Far (2014)	Cardinal (2016)	Elsewhere (2017)

Singles from Cardinal
- 1. "Old Friends" Released: January 5, 2016

Cardinal is the second studio album by American rock band Pinegrove, released February 12, 2016 on Run for Cover. Pinegrove formed in Montclair, New Jersey in 2010, and spent their early years self-releasing their music and performing at DIY shows. Their first record, Meridian, was released in 2012, and later compiled into the mixtape Everything So Far (2014). In the early 2010s, the members relocated from their hometown of Montclair to Brooklyn, New York. The band's frontman, singer-songwriter Evan Stephens Hall, however, decided to return home, where he and drummer Zack Levine produced Cardinal.

Cardinal was recorded in the duo's parents' basements in Montclair. Hall wrote the lyrics for the album, which are semi-autobiographical and touch on themes of love, space, and distance. The album's cover art, also designed by Hall, intends to capture these subjects via two interconnected squares. Pinegrove signed to independent record label Run for Cover to release Cardinal, which was issued on February 12, 2016. It received acclaim from music critics, and was featured on many year-end "best of" lists by national media. To promote the album, Pinegrove toured extensively in both the U.S. and Europe. Likewise, an expanded edition of Cardinal was released only in Australia, featuring additional content.

== Background ==
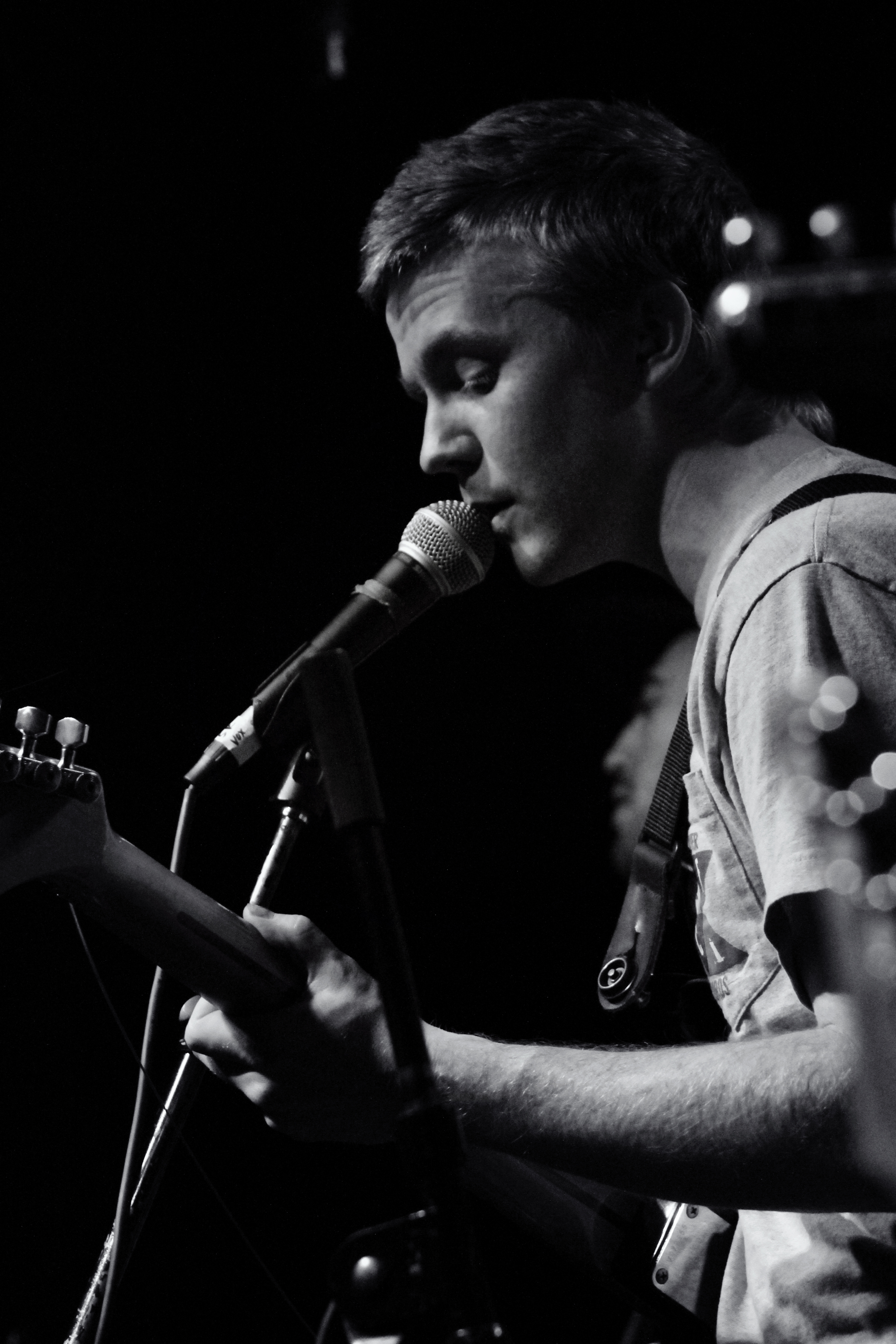
Evan Stephens Hall, the band's frontman and singer-songwriter, performing in 2016.

Pinegrove was formed in 2010 in Montclair, New Jersey by singer-songwriter Evan Stephens Hall and drummer Zack Levine. The two had known each other since their childhood, and both grew up playing music. Their first project was a grunge band named Dogwater in their high school days. Pinegrove's first album, Meridian, was self-released in 2012. Following its release and the members' graduation from college, Pinegrove relocated to Brooklyn, New York, considering it a necessary move to garner more notoriety. Hall eventually returned to Montclair and lived at his parents' home, where he felt more comfortable writing music. In 2014, Pinegrove released a compilation album, Everything So Far, comprising their early material.

Cardinal was recorded in Levine and Hall's parents' basements in Montclair, with additional recording taking place at the Owlery in Chicago, Illinois. Following the album's completion, Hall shared the album with friends and family, including Cam Boucher of the band Sorority Noise. Boucher encouraged Hall to connect with Run for Cover Records, which eventually signed the band in 2015.

== Composition and artwork ==
"Aphasia"
A sample of "Aphasia". The song exemplifies the album's mix of indie rock and country elements, and also showcases the quiet/loud dynamic present on the album.

The sound of the album is a blend of indie rock, pop, and country elements. Reviewers also noted strains of heartland rock, Americana, pop punk, and emo music in its stylistic origins. This led tastemakers to include Pinegrove among a wave of "emo revival" acts, and while Hall stopped short of labeling the group, he acknowledged Cardinal could be "lyrically confessional, emotionally direct, and emotive vocally, frequently." In response, Hall clarified the band's mission: "emo points inwards and it's our aim to point outwards." Aside from the standard guitar, bass guitar, and drums, Cardinal incorporates pedal steel guitar and banjos as well. Writer Collin Brennan, in his review for Consequence of Sound, said Cardinal "evokes the stars and the woods and the vast open spaces of America." Reviewers frequently cited Wilco as a point of reference for the music on Cardinal, though Hall narrowed down the band's lineage to My Morning Jacket and Bon Iver. Lyrically, Hall was also inspired by the novelists Virginia Woolf and David Foster Wallace.

"Old Friends" opens the record, and Hall considered it to have "an element of staying the same while everything around you changes and wanting to be adaptable but also being a little stubborn about it." "Cadmium" was inspired by the book I Send You This Cadmium Red by John Berger and John Christie, which includes a scene wherein one character sends a letter simply composed of a square. Hall at that time was sending letters to a friend on the West Coast, and the two eventually began exchanging shapes instead of words. "Aphasia" is titled after "a neurological speech disorder affecting one’s ability to communicate." "Size of the Moon" previously appeared on the band's 2014 release Mixtape Two in an acoustic iteration. On Cardinal, the song is aided by the full band and expanded. The last song of the album, "New Friends", creates a bookend with the first track. The song is about dedicating too much of oneself to a sole relationship while neglecting the others that are also important. Both of Levine and Hall's parents are musicians, and appear on the album. Doug Hall contributes piano on "Waveform" and Mike Levine adds lap steel to "Old Friends", "Then Again", and "Aphasia".

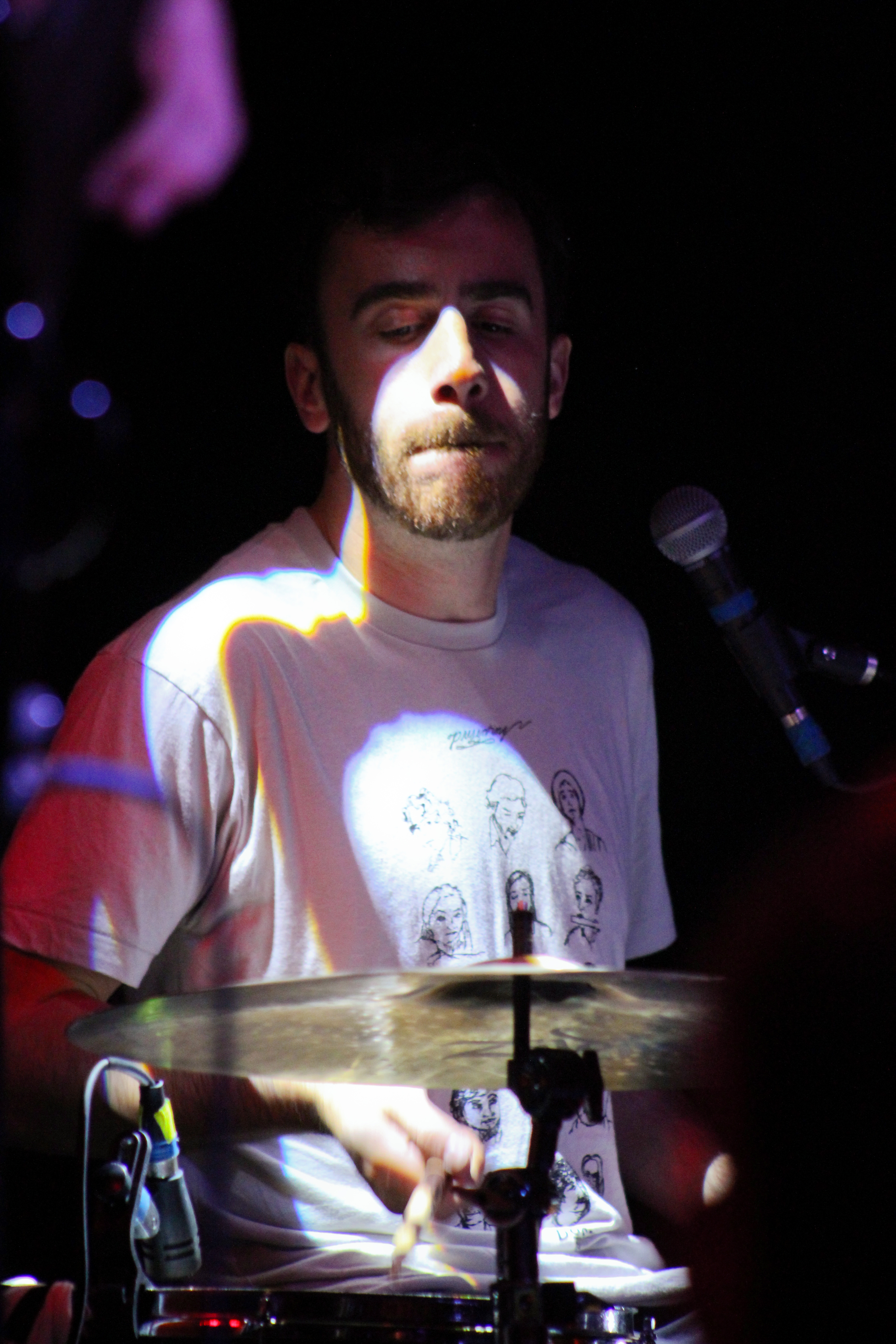
Zack Levine, the group's co-founder and drummer, performing in 2016.

Cardinal is a semi-autobiographical work, though Hall was careful not to depict his friends or family without their consent. "On the one hand you’re always looking for interesting content that speaks to the human condition but on then on the other, your friends don’t really want to be objectified like that," he said in an interview not long after the album's release. When creating the album, Hall would walk around Montclair's Brookdale Park on a nightly basis. His return to his hometown inspired the album thematically, as well as the concept of distance and space. Love is a main component of the album's contents as well: "These are love songs, but more broadly than romantic love. These are about platonic and familial love, and about approaching everyone you know, but especially everyone you don’t know with respect," Hall said.

The cover art of Cardinal, designed by Hall, depicts two red squares intertwined on a gray background. It reflects Hall's interest in simple colors and shapes, imagery which defined the band since the beginning. In addition, several lyrics on the album reference the color red either directly or through metaphor, most notably in "Cadmium" and "Waveform". Likewise, the album's title references the color of a cardinal, which Hall interpreted as a harbinger of creativity. Hall's inspiration for the cover included the writer George Saunders. "I sort of imagined that square number one in the lower left-hand side is a letter that I’m writing and then the second squares shows that I’m sending it off and my words are traveling."

== Release ==
Professional ratings
Aggregate scores
Source	Rating
Metacritic	84/100
Review scores
Source	Rating
AbsolutePunk	9.5/10
AllMusic	4/5 stars
Consequence of Sound	B+
DIY	4/5 stars
Exclaim!	8/10
Kerrang!	4/5
Pitchfork	8.0/10
Spin	8/10

Cardinal was announced on January 5, 2016, via Stereogum. On the same day, the band released the single "Old Friends", the first song on the album. An expanded edition was released in Australia in July 2016, including two live recordings (dubbed Schuylkill Sessions) and demos. To promote the album, Pinegrove embarked on a U.S. tour opening for the emo acts Into It. Over It. and the World Is a Beautiful Place & I Am No Longer Afraid to Die, and headlined for the first time nationally between June and August 2016, supported by Sports, Ratboys, and Half Waif. In all, the band played over 200 shows in 2016. They set off for a European trek supporting Cardinal in February 2017. A number of the songs on Cardinal are present on Elsewhere, a Bandcamp-only live album released in January 2017.

Cardinal was critically well-received, garnering acclaim from several prominent critics and music publications. Pitchfork's Ian Cohen wrote that "Cardinal feels like one big determined push outward, an album-length fight against solipsism without losing your sense of self in the process." Collin Brennan at Consequence of Sound described it as an album "that keeps one foot in the past but occasionally looks toward the future with loud guitars, uplifting choruses, and a prevailing sense that life is best listened to with the volume turned all the way up." Colin Joyce, writing for Spin, dubbed the record "emotionally direct and endearing," and commented, "It feels bold, somehow, to make a record like this." Josh Terry of the Chicago Tribune was effusive, opining that "With Cardinal, I don't think there's a more confident display of a new songwriting talent in recent memory."

== Accolades ==
Publication	Accolade	Year	Rank	Ref.
The A.V. Club	The A.V. Club's Top 50 Albums of 2016	2016	4	
American Songwriter	Top 50 Albums of 2016	2016	44	
Consequence of Sound	Top 50 Albums of 2016	2016	30	
Paste	The 50 Best Albums of 2016	2016	14	
Pitchfork	The 20 Best Rock Albums of 2016	2016	—N/a	
Pitchfork	The Best Albums of 2016	2016	46	
The Skinny	Top 50 Albums of 2016	2016	20	
Stereogum	The 50 Best Albums of 2016	2016	24	
NPR	Best 50 Albums of 2016	2016	38	

== Track listing ==
All tracks are written by Evan Stephens Hall.

No.	Title	Length
1.	"Old Friends"	3:28
2.	"Cadmium"	4:12
3.	"Then Again"	2:39
4.	"Aphasia"	4:31
5.	"Visiting"	3:07
6.	"Waveform"	4:31
7.	"Size of the Moon"	4:47
8.	"New Friends"	3:16
Total length:		30:45

Expanded edition bonus tracks
No.	Title	Length
9.	"Paterson + Leo"	1:45
10.	"Waveform" (demo)	4:39
11.	"Aphasia" (demo)	4:05
12.	"Old Friends" (Schuylkill session)	3:42
13.	"New Friends" (Schuylkill session)	3:05
Total length:		47:41

== Personnel ==
Pinegrove

- Evan Stephens Hall - guitar, vocals; percussion (tracks 1, 2, 3, 4, and 7), banjo (tracks 1, 5, and 7), (keys tracks 1 and 7) bass (track 1)
- Nick Levine - guitar; vocals (tracks 2, 5, and 7), bass (track 3), banjo (track 8)
- Zack Levine - drums; percussion (tracks 2, 3, 4, and 7)

Additional personnel

- Sam Skinner - bass (tracks 4, 5, 6, 7, and 8), keys (track 7)
- Nandi Rose Plunkett - vocals
- Adan Carlo Feliciano - bass (track 2)
- Mike Levine - pedal steel (tracks 1, 3, and 4)
- Doug Hall - piano (track 6)

== Charts ==
Chart (2016)	Peak position
US Heatseekers Albums (Billboard)	7
US Independent Albums (Billboard)	24
US Top Rock Albums (Billboard)	36
