= Pinegrove (band) =

American rock band

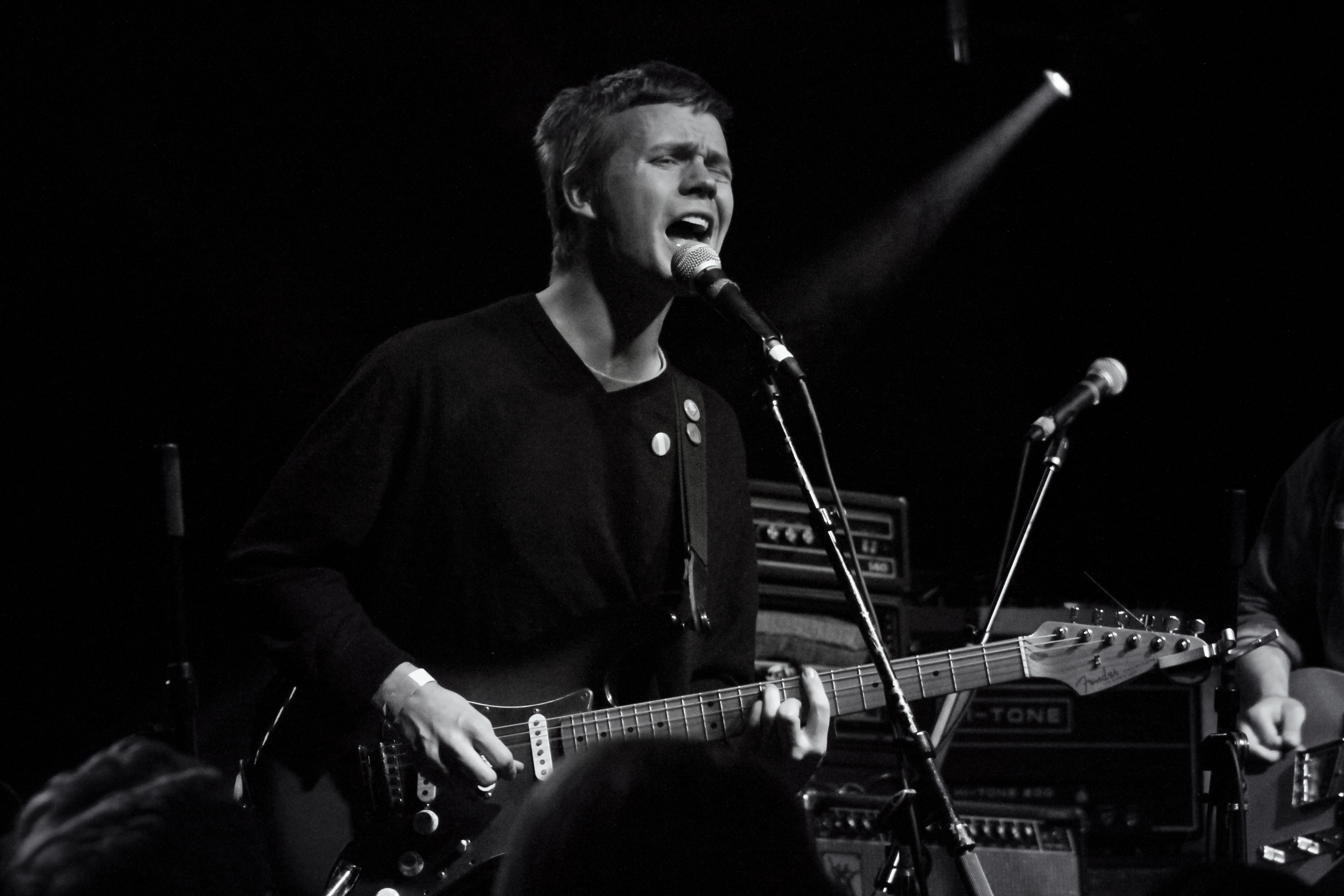
- Evan Stephens Hall, the band's frontman and singer-songwriter, performing in 2016.

Background information
- Origin: Montclair, New Jersey, U.S.
- Genres: Alternative country; emo; Midwest emo; indie rock; Americana
- Years active: 2010–2023 (hiatus)
- Labels: Run for Cover; Rough Trade
- Members: Evan Stephens Hall; (see "Personnel" section)
- Website: pinegroveband.com

Pinegrove is an American rock band formed in Montclair, New Jersey in 2010 by singer-songwriter Evan Stephens Hall and drummer Zack Levine. The band's musical style, which uses instruments such as the banjo and pedal steel guitar, is commonly described as a mix between alt-country and emo. Pinegrove's early years were spent self-releasing music – including their debut album, Meridian (2012) – and performing do-it-yourself (DIY) house shows.

After signing to independent record label Run for Cover, the group issued an anthology of their early work, titled Everything So Far (2015). Their second studio album, Cardinal (2016), represented a breakthrough, gathering a devoted fan listenership and appearing on many music critics' top-10 year-end lists. After recording its successor, Skylight, Pinegrove took a year-long hiatus after Hall was accused of sexual coercion by a person with whom he toured. The album saw proper release independently in 2018, and was followed by several sold-out tours. The band signed to British label Rough Trade for their next efforts, including Marigold (2020) and 11:11 (2022). The group announced a hiatus following Levine's exit from the group in 2023.

Pinegrove is known for their literary lyricism and loyal following of fans, which refer to themselves as "Pinenuts". The band's name comes from a prominent pine tree row on a nature reserve at Kenyon College, where Hall attended college. They are known for their geometric iconography, specifically using square shapes, and usage of the ampersand (&) in artwork and merchandise. Pinegrove is also recognized for their alignment with progressive causes, including charitable contributions to civil rights organizations.

== History ==
=== Early years (2010–2014) ===
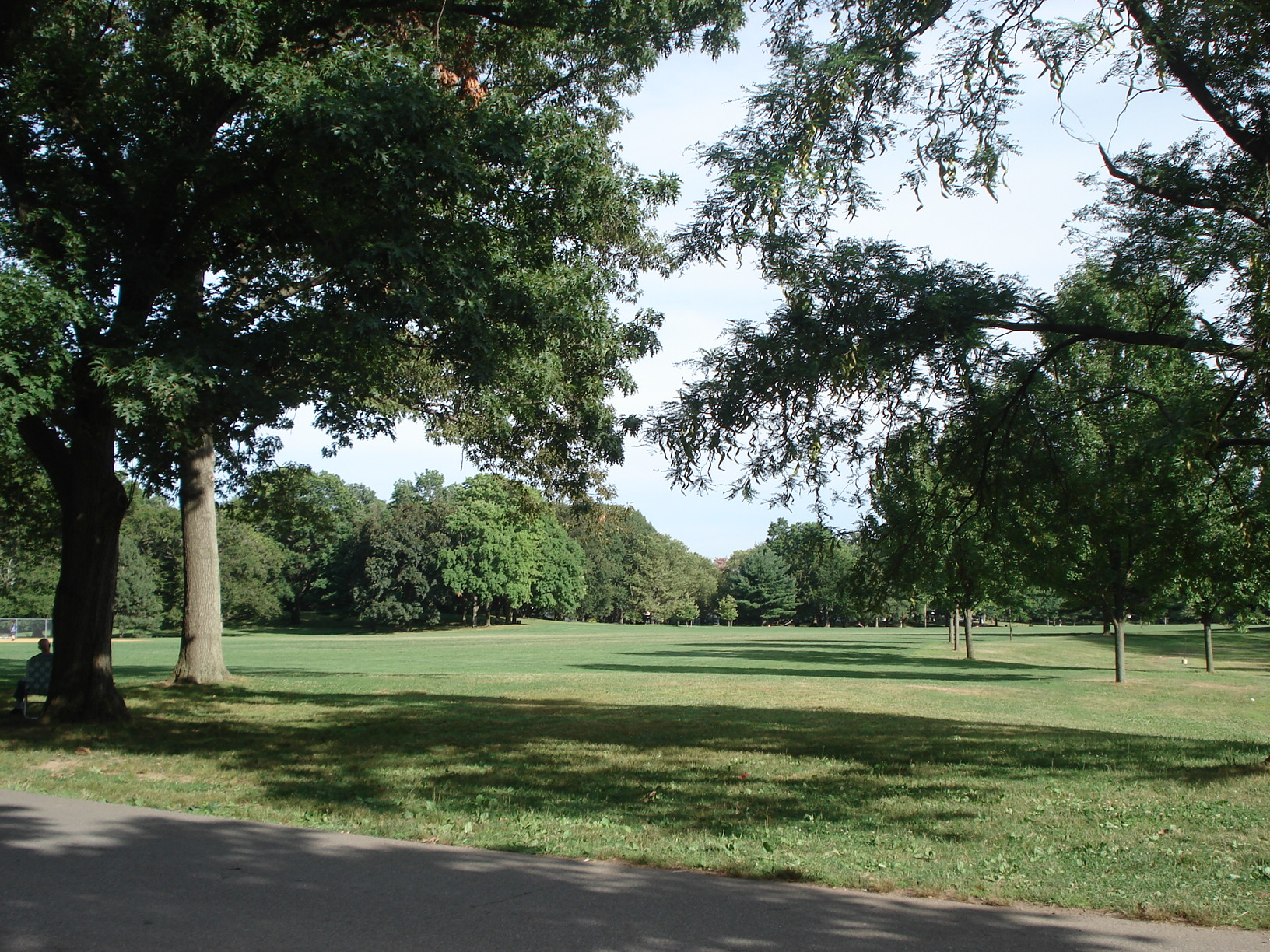
A meadow in Brookdale Park in Montclair, New Jersey, alluded to in several Pinegrove songs.

Pinegrove was formed in Montclair, a township in New Jersey, in 2010. Singer-songwriter Evan Stephens Hall and drummer Zack Levine met in childhood, during which their fathers played in a cover band together. The former two first began playing music together at seven years old, forming their first band, the Pug Fuglies, in the sixth grade. During the next grade, the duo began playing together in Dogwater, an experimental grunge band, which they focused on throughout high school. Hall went on to attend Kenyon College in Gambier, Ohio; the name of Pinegrove refers to the Brown Family Environmental Center, a nature reserve located in the Kokosing River valley. Hall frequented the land for introspection. One spot contained a region of pine trees, referred to as the "pinegrove" by students, that Hall felt was particularly important; its grid was visually geometrical, a concept often explored by Hall, as well as repetitious, which Hall related back to music.

Pinegrove's lineup has been variable over the course of its career; Levine and Hall are considered the band's core members. Since its inception, the band has also included guitar contributions from Levine's younger sibling, Nick Levine, as well as Josh Marré. Sam Skinner has co-produced each Pinegrove album and performed bass, and Aidan Carlo Feliciano and David Mitchell have also served as bassists. Throughout its history, the band has also featured vocals from musician Nandi Rose Plunkett, who has since ceased touring with them but continues to contribute to studio recordings. Plunkett, who met Hall at Kenyon College, leads her own synth-pop project called Half Waif, which Zack Levine and Carlo also play in. Levine explained in an interview that "[t]he full-time band structure [of Pinegrove] dissipated somewhat, based on who" was available to tour with the band.

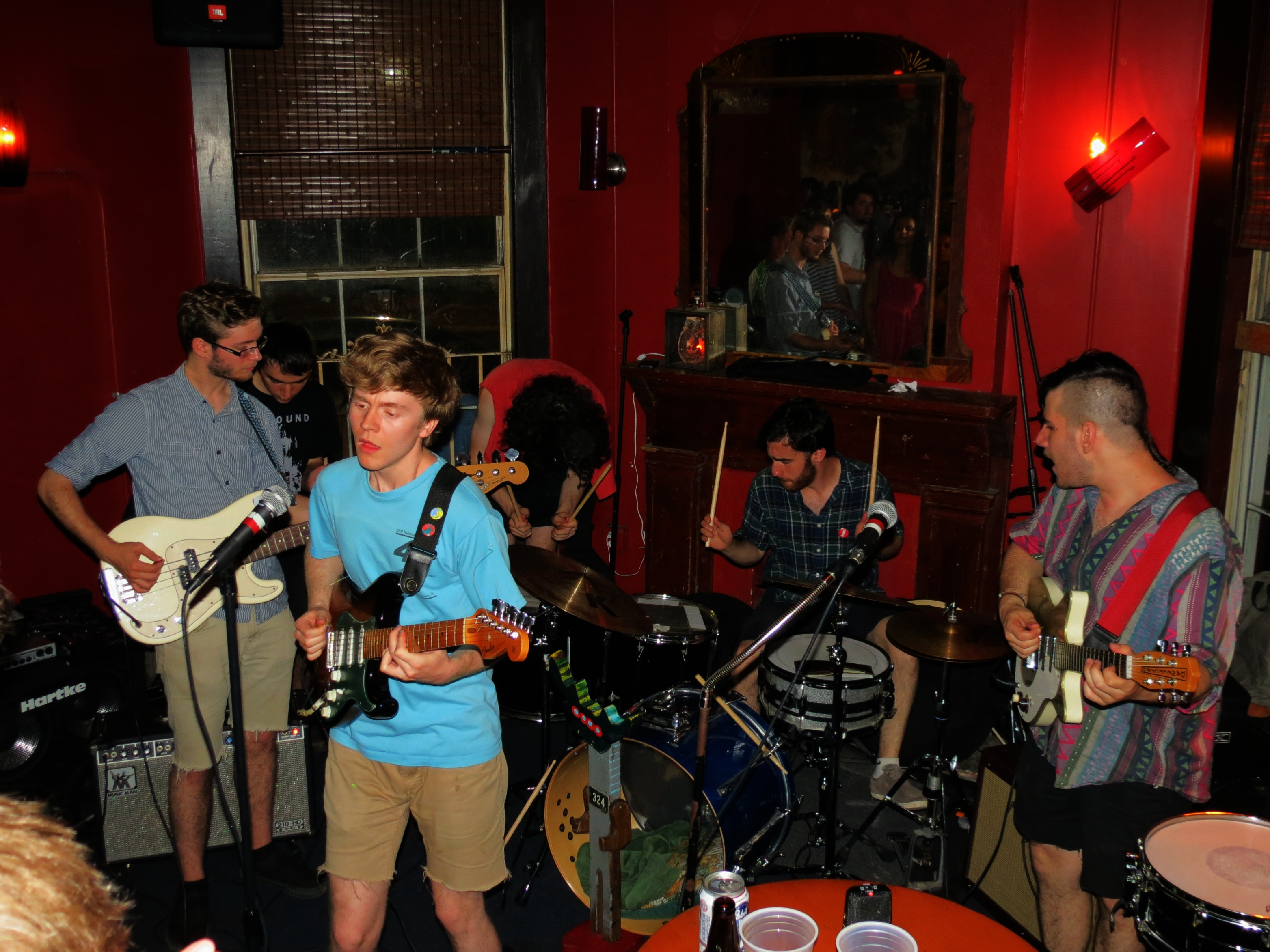
Pinegrove performing in New Orleans in 2014.

Pinegrove spent its early years performing DIY concerts in basements around Montclair and surrounding areas. Many of their early tours were booked by the members themselves and performed to "no one," according to the band. Hall posted the band's debut extended play (EP), titled Mixtape One, on online music platform Bandcamp in January 2010. Bandcamp was instrumental in the band's early career, with the group using it as an official website and merchandise store. The group followed it up with Meridian, their first album, released in February 2012. Spin contributor Rachel Brodsky writes that the LP was received "breathlessly in their microcosm of listeners," prompting the band to relocate east of the Hudson to Brooklyn, New York City, in hopes of garnering more notoriety. Hall spent nine months in the borough and returned home to Montclair, viewing it a more peaceful space to write music.

The band followed the release with & (2013), then Mixtape Two in 2014, upon which Hall observed listeners began to connect more strongly with the band. All of the aforementioned releases were re-configured into the track listing for their 2014 compilation, Everything So Far, which serves as an anthology of the band's early material. That same year, Pinegrove re-recorded their song "Problems" for Topshelf Records' 2014 digital sampler. After several years of self-releasing their music, the band signed to Boston-based independent label Run for Cover Records (RFC) in October 2015. The group were connected with the label by Cam Boucher of the band Sorority Noise. In addition, the group received help from booking agent Greg Horbal, whom the group met through Dexter Loos, a drummer who had worked with fellow Montclair acts Tawny Peaks and Philadelphia musician Alex G. RFC re-released Everything So Far with updated cover art that same month.

=== Breakthrough and mainstream success (2016–2019) ===
Cardinal, the band's second album, was recorded leisurely in Levine and Hall's parents' basements in Montclair over a period of four years. Upon its February 2016 release, the LP represented a breakthrough: it attracted wide critical acclaim, and the band began to amass a devoted fan listenership, which adopted the nickname "Pinenuts". With a new following and an increased national profile, Pinegrove began to sell out venues across the country. After a tour supporting Into It. Over It., they embarked on their first headlining tour of the U.S. between June and August 2016, supported by Sports, Ratboys, and Half Waif. The group recorded a live session for Audiotree that was released as a live album digitally; a Pitchfork review described its fan reception as "legendary." In December 2016, the band recorded a set on NPR's Tiny Desk Concerts featuring the tracks, "Need", "Angelina", "Old Friends", and "Waveform". Cardinal appeared on many critics' "best of" year-end lists; in all, the group played over 200 shows that year in support of the LP. Chris DeVille, writing for Stereogum, summarized the band's word-of-mouth rise to fame: "the project [has] evolved from a collegiate distraction to a hard-touring underground institution [...] Pinegrove are one of the greatest bands in the world right now." RFC physically issued Everything So Far in April 2017 for the first time; in support, the group embarked on another U.S. tour. The group also released another live album, Elsewhere, on the day Donald Trump was inaugurated as President in 2017; all sales were committed to civil rights advocacy.

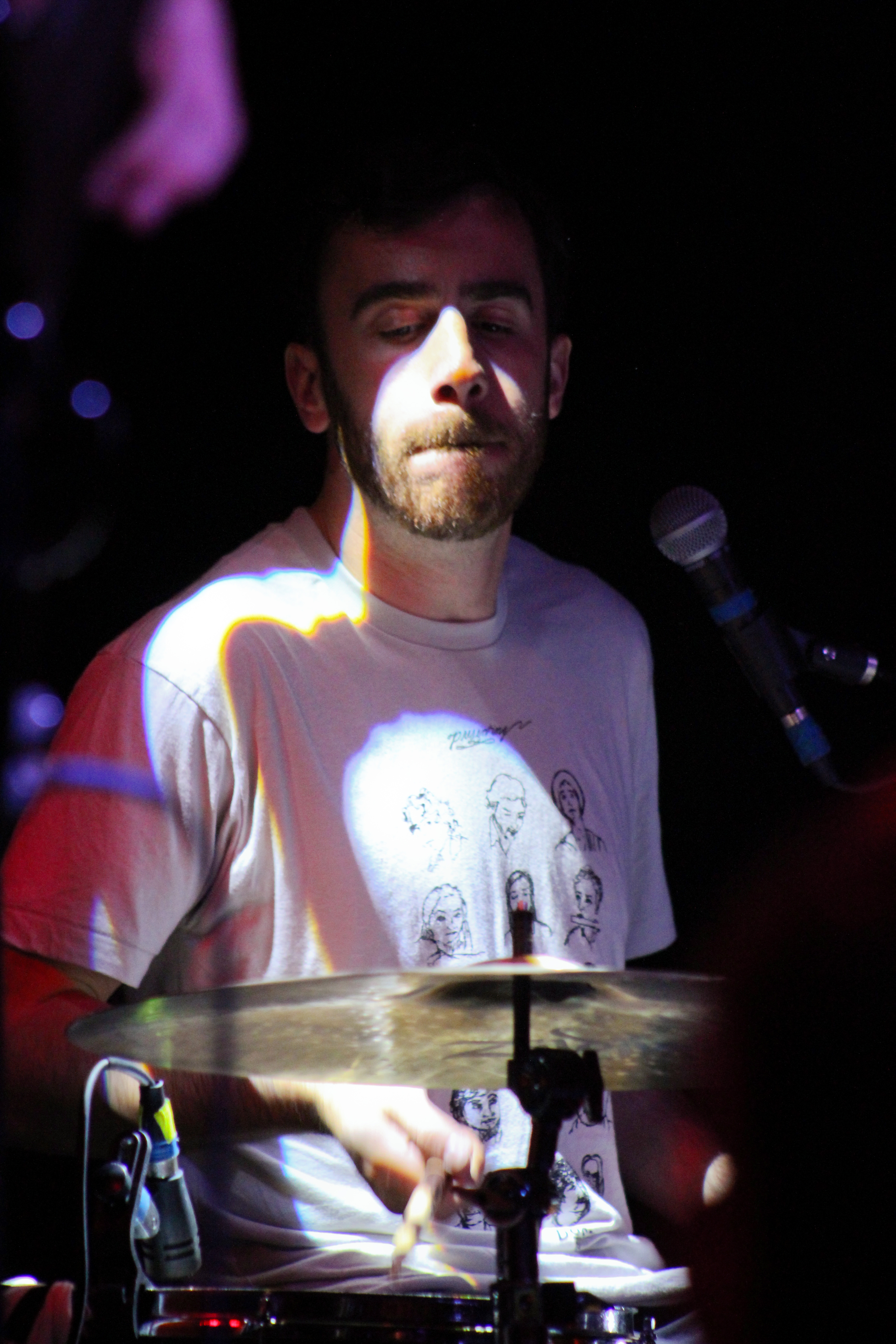
Zack Levine performing in 2016.

In 2017, Hall and Levine began to rent a rural farmhouse in Kinderhook, a town in upstate New York. The space, which the band named Amperland, functions as a studio and home, and was on lease to the members until 2020. The group recorded their third album, Skylight, at the property midway through the year. The band launched a ten-part documentary series about the making of the LP, titled Command + S. Afterwards, they toured the U.S. again between September and October 2017, supported by Florist and Lomelda, with further dates added for November and December, with Saintseneca and Adult Mom set to open. Skylight was completed that October; in early November, RFC issued its lead single, "Intrepid", and began sending advance copies to critics. The band were widely regarded as on the verge of stardom; according to journalist Kelefa Sanneh, the band at this moment "seemed poised to enlarge its audience significantly."

On November 21, 2017, Hall posted a lengthy statement on the band's Facebook page in which he described and responded to an allegation of "sexual coercion" from an unnamed woman, later revealed to be a member of the band's touring entourage. The band canceled the aforementioned dates for December and further removed tour dates overseas in the new year, which were set for March. Aside from an update confirming an indefinite hiatus, Pinegrove dropped out of the public eye altogether, shelving Skylight indefinitely and remaining silent for nearly a year. The controversy stalled the band's growing momentum, and complicated their relationship with fans. Its timing came at the height of the broader Me Too movement. Due to the uncertain nature of the allegations, many media outlets found the statement vague or confusing. More information surfaced in an April 2018 account in Spin, detailing the role of mental health organization Punk Talks in the controversy: the Philadelphia-based nonprofit was involved in facilitating Hall's statement, and had done so "without [the accuser's] knowledge, support or permission", as the accuser did not want the story to go public or a public statement to be made. A longer report by Jenn Pelly of Pitchfork was published that September, offering more details and announcing the band's return. The group's extended hiatus was at the request of Hall's accuser, with whom he came to a resolution via a private mediator.

Skylight saw independent release that month on Bandcamp; the group mutually parted ways with RFC after other artists on the label voiced concern about its association with Pinegrove. A small series of tour dates commenced between November and December 2018 domestically and abroad, which sold out. A physical release of Skylight followed in February 2019, promoted with a sold-out nationwide tour with Another Michael. The reaction to the band's "comeback" was described as muted, with many fans uneasy but mainly supportive. Overseas dates followed that April with Tom the Lion and Snow Coats, followed by a Midwestern/East Coast-focused U.S. tour, with Stephen Steinbrink and Boyscott. Much of these concerts were similarly sold out; AllMusic biographer Timothy Monger suggested the band "regained some of their lost momentum."

=== Later years and hiatus (2020–2023) ===
Later that year, the band signed to seminal indie label Rough Trade, based in England, to distribute their next full-length, 2020's Marigold. Like its predecessor, Marigold was recorded at Amperland, the band's farmhouse recording studio in Kinderhook. The band toured across the U.S. and Europe to support the release, assisted by Lake and Big Thief's Buck Meek. Their 2020 touring itinerary was stalled by the COVID-19 pandemic; they were set to perform at several festivals, including Bonnaroo and Governors Ball. During the pandemic, the band released Amperland, NY, a dual live album/film that "reimagines" songs throughout the group's discography, recorded live at the Kinderhook home. The accompanying film, directed by Kenna Hynes, is adapted from a "surreal" short story by Hall with the band acting out "tall tales". The film's premiere screening featured a Q&A with the band moderated by actress Busy Philipps, and benefitted the environmental action group The Sunrise Movement.

The band's next studio material, 11:11, was released on January 28, 2022. It too was recorded in upstate New York, between the Building in Marlboro and at Levon Helm Studios in Woodstock. It was co-produced by Skinner and Hall as usual, but the band brought in veteran producer Chris Walla, formerly of Death Cab for Cutie, to mix the album. It was preceded by the singles "Orange" and "Alaska". The band announced a slew of 2022 tour dates, including a large North American leg and a handful of European dates in the first half of the year. In 2023, the band issued a concert film, Montclair: Pinegrove Live at the Wellmont Theater, recorded the night of their hometown show at the Wellmont Theater a year prior. The movie was shot and directed by Brian Paccione.

The band hinted at a slowdown of activity in the early 2020s, with each of its members pursuing individual callings. In April 2023, the band announced that founding drummer Zack Levine would be departing the group. Hall posted that the band would exist "on a more casual basis," in what was widely interpreted as a hiatus, with no active plans for performing. "Pinegrove is not over, but it seems this era is [...] Thanks for coming to see us play through the years," the post read.

In June 2023, Pinegrove's song "Need 2" gained traction on TikTok. This uptick was caused by a user with the handle @garrettlee39 performing a unique dance set to the song, which came to be coined the "Pinegrove shuffle". In an interview with Rolling Stone, Hall described the original video as "very strange and mesmerizing". He did, however, reiterate that the band's newfound virality would not impact their hiatus:

I mean, we’re all in our thirties. We’ve got other things that we want to be doing, and I’m going to be studying English in a grad program in the fall. So there are a lot of things that I’m doing my best to finish up before I go, but I’m really excited to do this. I’m sort of viewing it as a sabbatical. It’s going to help me tell stories better.

== Imagery and following ==
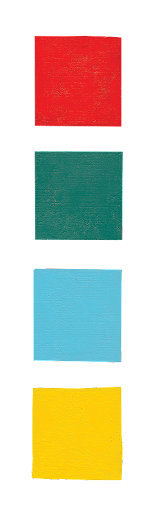
The group have frequently used square shapes on album art and merchandise.

Pinegrove's fan base, which refer to themselves as "Pinenuts", has been described as "vaguely religious" by Sanneh, and "cultish and symbolic," by Pelly. The group frequently uses square imagery in its album artwork and merchandise. Interlocking squares are featured prominently in the artwork for Cardinal, the band's breakthrough effort. The imagery reflects Hall's interest in simple colors and shapes. Pelly summarized the dual squares as representing "an ethic of tolerance and coexisting perspectives." Hall says the iconography stands as "a symbol for art, especially self-aware art because it is just the frame." Likewise, the band has frequently referred to the ampersand (&), a logogram that is the namesake of a song and EP by the band, as well as a pun for their home studio, Amperland. Hall has called ampersands "deliberately beautiful," and feels that they can be taken as a metaphor for the human condition. This interpretation stems from advice Hall received from a professor during a seminar on James Joyce in college:

Whenever there is an opportunity for multiple layers of reading, like when you read something and there are several different suggestions that the text provides, it's never either/or, it's always and. These layers live on top of each other and in unison with each other. They are all different ways to look at a thing. And so I extrapolated that a little bit as a way to experience the world. It's a reminder to keep an open mind, it's a reminder that life is messy and complex and there's something very elegant about a concise symbol that can still refer to the messiness of the world.

Fans, including actress Kristen Stewart, are known to tattoo the ampersand on their bodies; this is often referred to as a "Pinegrove tattoo".

Pinegrove have consistently aligned themselves with progressive causes throughout their career. All Bandcamp sales of the band's back catalog were donated to Planned Parenthood for a period, with profits from the live album Elsewhere devoted to the civil rights nonprofit Southern Poverty Law Center. All profits made from the band's third album, Skylight, were spread across three charities: the Voting Rights Project, the American Foundation for Suicide Prevention, and MusiCares. The band have also contributed to the Trevor Project, and to groups protesting construction of the Dakota Access Pipeline at the Standing Rock Indian Reservation. For Hall, these causes were not especially political in nature: "I do consider myself politically progressive, but I feel like our message [as a band] isn't a politicized one—it's a humanist one."

== Musical style and influences ==
Pinegrove's sound has frequently been referred to as a mix between alt-country, an offshoot of modern country music, and emo, a rock genre characterized by an emphasis on emotional expression. The group has toured with acts commonly labeled emo, such as The World Is a Beautiful Place & I Am No Longer Afraid to Die, while original label RFC is known for its association with fourth-wave emo bands. Pelly of Pitchfork notes "this affiliation makes sense: Their music is open-hearted, communal, earnest, lyrical, with a discernible ease." Cardinal's success led tastemakers to include Pinegrove among a wave of "emo revival" acts, and while Hall stopped short of labeling the group, he acknowledged his work could be "lyrically confessional, emotionally direct, and emotive vocally, frequently." In response, Hall clarified the band's mission: "emo points inwards and it's our aim to point outwards." The group also has been categorized as indie rock, math rock, and Americana; Hall himself once described the band as the "midpoint between math rock and Americana."

Musically, Pinegrove augments the standard guitar/drums/bass lineup with instruments such as banjo and pedal steel guitar. The group's style has been compared to fusion genre fore-bearers the Weakerthans, as well as Wilco, Built to Spill, "Gillian Welch, and early Death Cab for Cutie." Hall has listed My Morning Jacket and Bon Iver among the band's more direct musical influences; an early profile of the band narrativizes Hall and Levine's love of My Morning Jacket's live album Okonokos as the catalyst for starting their music careers. For Hall as a songwriter, his influences are split between music and literature; he has cited artists such as Stephen Steinbrink and Phil Elverum as inspirations, as well as writers George Saunders, William Faulkner, and Virginia Woolf. To this end, Hall has referred to Pinegrove as "language-arts rock."

== Personnel ==
Current members

- Evan Stephens Hall – lead vocals, guitar (2010–present)

Former members

- Zack Levine – drums, backing vocals (2010–2023)
- Sam Skinner – guitar, banjo, keyboards (2010–2023)
- Nick Levine – guitar, pedal steel, backing vocals (2010–2020)
- Aidan Carlo Feliciano – bass (2010–2017)
- Nandi Rose Plunkett – synthesizer, keyboards, backing vocals (2010–2017)
- Josh Marré – guitar, dobro, lap steel, backing vocals (2016–2022)
- David Mitchell – bass (2016–2017)
- Megan Benavente – bass, backing vocals (2017–2023)

== Discography ==
- Meridian (2012)
- Everything So Far (2014)
- Cardinal (2016)
- Skylight (2018)
- Marigold (2020)
- 11:11 (2022)
