= Jodi (musician) =

Indie rock musician

Jodi is the stage name of American indie rock musician Nick Levine. Levine is a former member of the band Pinegrove.

== History ==
Levine was a founding member of alternative country band Pinegrove, remaining a member of the band up until their 2020 album Marigold. In 2017, Levine released an EP titled "Karaoke." After departing Pinegrove, Levine announced plans to release their debut solo album. The album, titled Blue Heron, was released on July 16, 2021. It was named Stereogum's "Album of the Week" upon release and an "Album You Should Listen To" by Pitchfork, despite only giving the album a 5.8/10.
