= Supermodel (Måneskin song) =

Single by Måneskin

from the album Rush!
- Released: 13 May 2022
- Genre: Pop rock
- Length: 2:28
- Label: Epic; Sony
- Songwriters: Damiano David; Victoria De Angelis; Thomas Raggi; Ethan Torchio; Max Martin; Justin Tranter; Rami Yacoub; Sylvester Sivertsen
- Producers: Martin; Yacoub; Sly

Måneskin singles chronology
"Mammamia" (2021)	"Supermodel" (2022)	"If I Can Dream" (2022)

Music video
- "Supermodel" on YouTube

"Supermodel" is a song by Italian rock band Måneskin. It was released on 13 May 2022 through Epic Records and Sony Music, as the second single of their third studio album, Rush! (2023). It was written by Måneskin members Damiano David, Victoria De Angelis, Thomas Raggi and Ethan Torchio, alongside Justin Tranter and the song's producers Max Martin, Rami Yacoub and Sylvester Sivertsen. It is a California-inspired pop rock track with a grunge intro. Inspired by the group's stay in Los Angeles, they created a fictional character named "Supermodel", and the song talks about her life–what she does for a living, how she spends her life and that she would not love anyone back. The single was mostly met with positive reviews; however, in a review posted by Jenesaispop, Max Martin's production was deemed as damaging to the band's personality.

"Supermodel" was released ahead of the band's interval performance in the final of the Eurovision Song Contest 2022 in Turin, where they debuted the song live. Additionally, they performed it on The Tonight Show Starring Jimmy Fallon one week later. To further promote the track, its music video was published on 31 May. Directed by Bedroom Projects and Ben Chappel, the video pays homage to 1990s cinema, while its plotline involves the titular "Supermodel", portrayed by Nina Marker, who stole De Angelis' purse. The band is seen trying to capture her to reclaim the stolen object. Commercially, the single peaked within top ten of five countries, and charted at number 11 in Italy, where it was certified platinum.

== Background and development ==
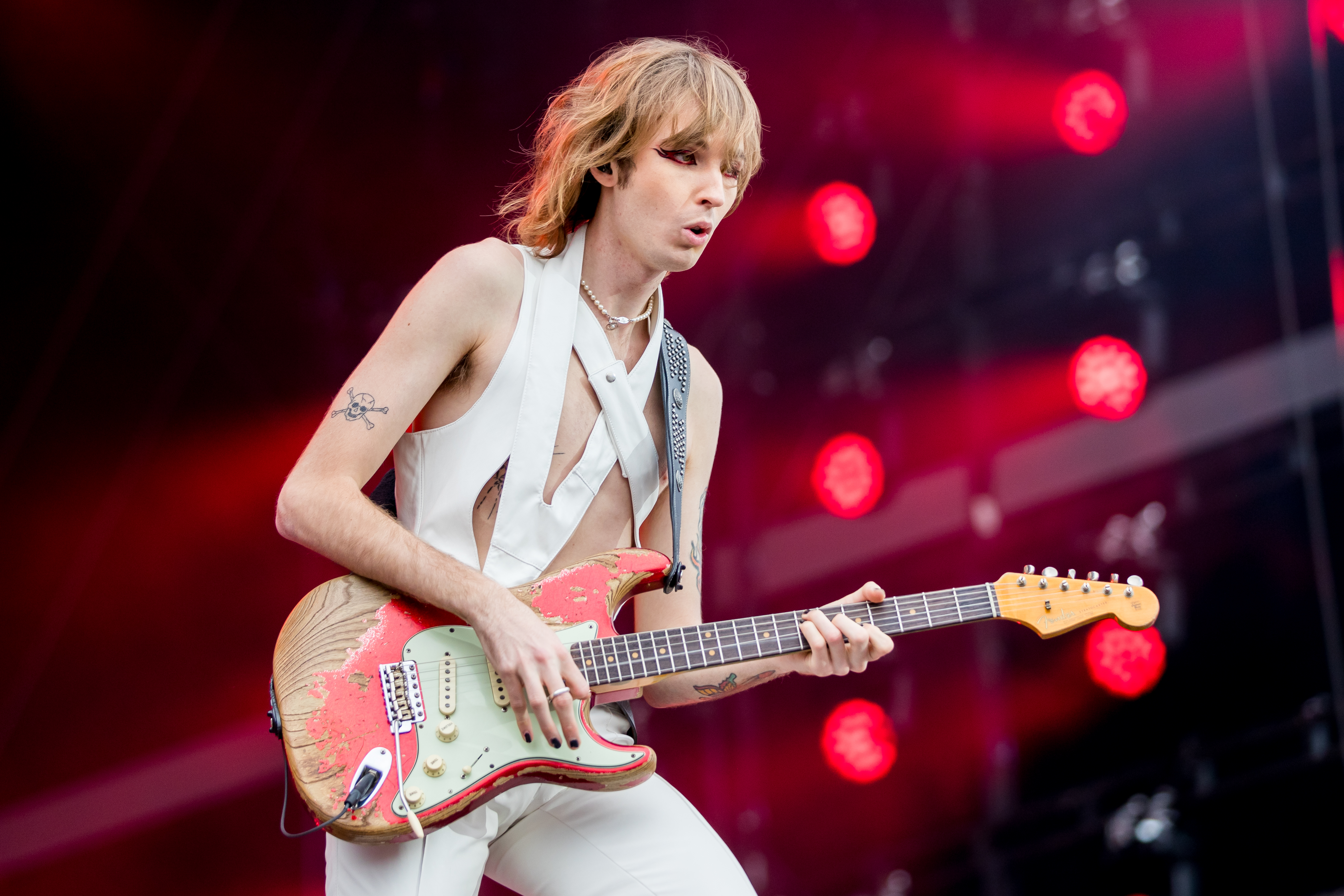
Måneskin's guitarist Thomas Raggi (pictured), said that they were inspired by "California vibe" while creating the song, which was noticed by music critics.

Following Måneskin's win at the Eurovision Song Contest 2021 with the song "Zitti e buoni", the band achieved global success. In February 2022, they moved to Los Angeles to record their third studio album. In the city, they met many people obsessed with an idea of "celebrity" status or trying really hard to dress up for parties. According to the group's frontman, Damiano David, the band members were thinking that this obsession with status and appearance must be an exaggeration made by TV and movies, but it turned out to be real. This caused them to wonder whether or not these types of people are happy, leading to the creation of a fictional character called "Supermodel".

"Supermodel" was written by the members of Måneskin, Justin Tranter, and the song's producers Max Martin, Rami Yacoub, and Sly. Måneskin first met Martin after their performance in Los Angeles in November 2021, and decided to work with him. In an interview with Billboard, David described experience of working with Martin as "cool", and said that he and his team "never tried to force us to do something that we didn't want to do [instead] he basically wanted to understand how we work and how we're used to making music and what makes us happy about music." "Supermodel" came from a jamming session that the band had, when the producer asked "How can I help you to make it global?". The song depicts the life of its titular character, as well as is a criticism of people the group has encountered in Los Angeles. The band's frontman admitted in an interview with BBC, that "Supermodel" is not one of their "deepest" songs, but it is a "good fun"; while the group's guitarist, Thomas Raggi, said that he took inspiration from "California vibe" for Variety.

== Music and lyrics ==
"Supermodel" is a pop rock song, that starts with a grunge intro, compared to Nirvana's "Smells Like Teen Spirit" (1991). Music critics noted that the track has a California sound to it, while Dominika Pawłowska from Eska Rock likened it to the sound of Red Hot Chili Peppers. Following the intro, Damiano starts singing with "sultry" vocals, backed-up by fast-paced rhythm, and Victoria De Angelis' "three-dimensional" bass, whilst the chorus has been described as "adrenaline-pumping" by Panorama's Gabriele Antonucci. Bria McNeal of Nylon opined that the track is "catchy"; while Jenesaispop's Paul Bacon noted that its "2000's-sounding guitars" are reminiscent of Maroon 5. Writing for Rockol, Claudio Cabona opined that "Supermodel" is a "mix between Ed Sheeran flow and Red Hot Chili Peppers guitar style".

The lyrics of "Supermodel" focus on the titular character. David describes this "'90s supermodel" as a girl with a religious background, which she gave up to pursue a more exciting lifestyle. Later in the first verse, he sings that she has a new friend―"a drag queen named The Virgin Mary". In the pre-chorus, the singer warns the listener that the character, "won't love [them] back", even if they develop feeling towards her. The chorus sees Damiano chanting "Hey, don't think about it, hey, just let it go / 'Cause her boyfriend is the rock n' roll / Savor every moment till she has to go / 'Cause her boyfriend is the rock n' roll". The second verse, talks about "Supermodel" life's dark side; that she works "around the clock", steals "your Basquiat", and she earns money through OnlyFans.

== Critical reception ==
Julien Goncalves of Pure Charts called the song "electric", while Kerrang!'s Emily Carter described it as "glistening". Writing for NME, Sam Moore dubbed the track "lively". In an article published in Gazzetta del Sud, it was opined that "'Supermodel', with a typically Californian sound and a contagious modern rock groove, is the new, extraordinary proof of maturation by a band in unstoppable evolution, which continues from time to time to define its own inimitable rock n' roll identity." On the similar note, a writer from the HuffPost dubbed the song's characteristics, as proof of Måneskin's maturation. Doris Daga of Vogue Scandinavia said that it is a "perfect track to get the party started". In an Elle article, the song's title has been dubbed as "unequivocal". Jenesaispop posted an ambivalent review of "Supermodel", with Bacon praising its "straight-to-the-point lyrics" and David's charisma, and how his "suggestive cadence blends with the always effective Max Martin", while Jordi Bardají criticized the lyrics, which he deemed as "clichéd" and outdated, opining that Max Martin's production dilutes the band's personality, adding that "'Supermodel' is far from being the song that the public wants from Måneskin."

== Release and commercial performance ==
Måneskin announced the release of "Supermodel" on 4 May 2022 through their social media. On the next day, they shared a video containing the song's snippet and the music video's behind-the-scenes content, with the caption "Fancy a party?". The band continued teasing the single in the following days with various pictures and videos on Instagram, one clip featuring the song's first verse with footage of David eating fruits and drinking champagne in a bathtub. "Supermodel" was released for digital download and streaming on 13 May, it was also sent to Italian airplay, through Epic Records and Sony Music. On 17 May, Arista Records sent the single to the US alternative radio stations. Commercially, "Supermodel" landed at number 11 in Italy and was certified platinum by Federazione Industria Musicale Italiana for selling over 100 thousand copies. It peaked within the top ten in seven other countries: Bulgaria, Croatia, Finland, Greece, Lithuania, Poland, as well as in the Flanders region of Belgium. In the United States, the song managed to enter various charts including Hot Rock & Alternative Songs at number 14 and the Mainstream Top 40 at number 38. Additionally, the track managed to chart at number 114 on the Billboard Global 200.

== Music video ==
=== Background and inspiration ===
The band fighting over a purse with "Supermodel" in the music video.

Following the release of "Supermodel", Måneskin announced that its music video would be published in few weeks, while they were teasing it through social media. The video was filmed in London and shot on 16 mm film. Directed by Bedroom and Ben Chappell, the video features the titular character of "Supermodel" played by Danish fashion model Nina Marker. The band pays homage to their most favorite movies of the 1990s, as well as portray the song's character in the clip. They also said that they "worked closely with the directors and Ben [Chappell] to recreate frame shots and sequences from our favourite '90s films", admitting that they had fun during the shooting and "playing funny scenes that reminded us of a detective B-movie". Chappell commented that the idea for the clip came from a "week of sitting around the pool in LA with the band thumbing through '90s Vogue magazines and talking about our favourite '90s movies", adding that they tried to "sneak in as many small references as we could throughout the video." Bedroom listed that the main inspirations for the video were: Run Lola Run (1998), Reservoir Dogs (1992), Hitchcock (2012), while the idea of the "MacGuffin of the mysterious purse" was reminiscent of Marnie (1964) and Pulp Fiction (1994). They also noted that 1950s Hollywood provided inspiration as well. The visual was uploaded to the group's YouTube channel on 31 May 2022. During the video shoot, David injured his ankle.

=== Synopsis and reception ===
The music video showcases 1990s-stylised parties. The titular character, "Supermodel", runs away from the first party, and from Måneskin at whole, since she stole a purse from De Angelis. The band members try to catch her and reclaim the purse. Will Lavin of NME commented that the visual is "cinematic", adding that "it captures the song's fierce mood and playful lyrics as a series of catastrophic events unfold". Writing for Pure Charts, Théau Berthelot likened the video to Stanley Kubrick's 1999 movie Eyes Wide Shut.

== Live performances ==
On 14 May 2022, Måneskin premiered the song live at the PalaOlimpico in Turin, Italy as an interval act in the final of the Eurovision Song Contest 2022. The performance follows the band's win at the previous year's contest with the song "Zitti e buoni". During the performance, David had an injured ankle, which occurred during the shooting of the music video. The band additionally performed a short rendition of their cover of Elvis Presley's "If I Can Dream", later included as part of the soundtrack to the 2022 film Elvis. NME's Will Richards and Rebekah Gonzalez of KISS-FM dubbed the live rendition of "Supermodel" as "electric". On 20 May, the band performed the song on The Tonight Show Starring Jimmy Fallon, with host Jimmy Fallon filling in for bassist De Angelis due to her illness. Fallon wore a blonde wig, colourful eyeliner, and a red and black jacket to portray De Angelis. On 28 August, the band performed the song at the 2022 MTV Video Music Awards, during which a wardrobe malfunction caused most of the performance to be interrupted on the televised broadcast of the event.

== Credits and personnel ==
- Måneskin – songwriting
  - Damiano David – vocals
  - Victoria De Angelis – bass
  - Thomas Raggi – guitar
  - Ethan Torchio – drums
- Max Martin – songwriting, production
- Rami Yacoub – songwriting, production
- Sylvester Sivertsen – songwriting, production
- Justin Tranter – songwriting
- Jeremy Lertola – engineering
- Luca Pellegrini – engineering
- Sam Holland – engineering
- Spike Stent – mixing

== Charts ==
=== Weekly charts ===
2022 weekly chart performance
Chart (2022)	Peak position
Austria (Ö3 Austria Top 40)	24
Belarus Airplay (TopHit)	2
Belgium (Ultratop 50 Flanders)	4
Belgium (Ultratop 50 Wallonia)	21
Bulgaria Airplay (PROPHON)	4
Canada Hot 100 (Billboard)	100
Canada Rock (Billboard)	10
CIS Airplay (TopHit)	4
Croatia International Airplay (Top lista)	4
Czech Republic Airplay (ČNS IFPI)	5
Czech Republic Singles Digital (ČNS IFPI)	19
Estonia Airplay (TopHit)	22
Finland (Suomen virallinen lista)	9
France (SNEP)	48
Germany (GfK)	49
Global 200 (Billboard)	114
Greece International (IFPI)	2
Hungary (Single Top 40)	14
Hungary (Stream Top 40)	20
Ireland (IRMA)	41
Israel International Airplay (Media Forest)	3
Italy (FIMI)	11
Japan Hot Overseas (Billboard Japan)	7
Kazakhstan Airplay (TopHit)	10
Latvia Streaming (LaIPA)	17
Lithuania (AGATA)	3
Netherlands (Dutch Top 40)	15
Netherlands (Single Top 100)	29
New Zealand Hot Singles (RMNZ)	27
Poland Airplay (ZPAV)	4
Portugal (AFP)	132
Russia Airplay (TopHit)	3
San Marino Airplay (SMRTV Top 50)	15
Slovakia Airplay (ČNS IFPI)	28
Slovakia Singles Digital (ČNS IFPI)	32
Sweden (Sverigetopplistan)	23
Switzerland (Schweizer Hitparade)	18
Ukraine Airplay (TopHit)	117
UK Singles (Official Charts)	43
US Hot Rock & Alternative Songs (Billboard)	13
US Rock & Alternative Airplay (Billboard)	5
US Pop Airplay (Billboard)	34

2026 weekly chart performance
Chart (2026)	Peak position
Lithuania Airplay (TopHit)	88

=== Monthly charts ===
Monthly chart performance for "Supermodel"
Chart (2022–2023)	Peak position
Belarus Airplay (TopHit)	2
CIS Airplay (TopHit)	3
Estonia Airplay (TopHit)	37
Kazakhstan Airplay (TopHit)	31
Russia Airplay (TopHit)	3

=== Year-end charts ===
2022 year-end chart performance for "Supermodel"
Chart (2022)	Position
Austria (Ö3 Austria Top 40)	71
Belgium (Ultratop 50 Flanders)	37
Belgium (Ultratop 50 Wallonia)	86
CIS Airplay (TopHit)	24
Croatia (HRT)	35
France (SNEP)	190
Italy (FIMI)	57
Lithuania (AGATA)	21
Netherlands (Dutch Top 40)	85
Poland (ZPAV)	31
Russia Airplay (TopHit)	28
US Hot Rock & Alternative Songs (Billboard)	37

2023 year-end chart performance for "Supermodel"
Chart (2023)	Position
Belarus Airplay (TopHit)	51
CIS Airplay (TopHit)	130
Russia Airplay (TopHit)	149

2024 year-end chart performance for "Supermodel"
Chart (2024)	Position
Estonia Airplay (TopHit)	94

== Certifications ==
Certifications for "Supermodel"
Region	Certification	Certified units/sales
Austria (IFPI Austria)	Platinum	30,000^{‡}
Brazil (Pro-Música Brasil)	Platinum	40,000^{‡}
Canada (Music Canada)	Gold	40,000^{‡}
France (SNEP)	Diamond	333,333^{‡}
Hungary (MAHASZ)	Platinum	4,000^{‡}
Italy (FIMI)	2× Platinum	200,000^{‡}
Poland (ZPAV)	Platinum	50,000^{‡}
Spain (Promusicae)	Gold	30,000^{‡}
Switzerland (IFPI Switzerland)	Gold	10,000^{‡}
United Kingdom (BPI)	Silver	200,000^{‡}
United States (RIAA)	Gold	500,000^{‡}
Streaming
Greece (IFPI Greece)	Gold	1,000,000^{†}
Sweden (GLF)	Gold	4,000,000^{†}
^{‡} Sales+streaming figures based on certification alone.^{†} Streaming-only figures based on certification alone.

== Release history ==
Release dates and formats for "Supermodel"
Region	Date	Format(s)	Label	Ref.
Various	13 May 2022	Digital download; streaming	Epic	
Italy	13 May 2022	Radio airplay	Sony	
United States	17 May 2022	Alternative radio	Arista	
