= Me & You Together Song =

Single by the 1975

from the album Notes on a Conditional Form
- Released: 16 January 2020
- Genre: Dream pop; pop rock; jangle pop
- Length: 3:27
- Label: Dirty Hit; Polydor
- Songwriters: Matthew Healy; George Daniel; Adam Hann; Ross MacDonald
- Producers: Matthew Healy; George Daniel; Jonathan Gilmore

The 1975 singles chronology
"Frail State of Mind" (2019)	"Me & You Together Song" (2020)	"The Birthday Party" (2020)

Music video
- "Me & You Together Song" on YouTube

"Me & You Together Song" is a song by English band the 1975 from their fourth studio album, Notes on a Conditional Form (2020). The song was released on 16 January 2020 through Dirty Hit and Polydor Records as the third single from the album. It was written by band members Matty Healy, George Daniel, Adam Hann and Ross MacDonald. Production of the song was handled by Daniel and Healy alongside Jonathan Gilmore. Inspired by Amy Watson, Chelsea Pollard and the idealism of a teenage romance, Healy conceived the song as part of the soundtrack to German, a film he planned on creating. Although the film did not come to fruition, the 1975 continued to work on the song, channeling the sound of their former band Drive Like I Do.

"Me & You Together Song" is a melancholic and sonically nihilistic dream pop and pop rock power ballad produced in a retro style that emulates rock music in the 1990s and early 2000s. It has a nostalgic soft rock instrumentation, composed of echoing, jangly pop rock guitars, dreamy guitar riffs, rumbling bass, clanging keyboards and bouncy, thunderous drums. The song's lyrics detail Healy's unrequited love for a female friend, describing the stages and moments that led to his lifelong affection for her. Thematically, it explores unrequited affection, rejection and heartbreak. The song's composition and lyrics drew comparisons to the soundtracks of 1990s romantic comedy films, Blink-182, Hanson, the Goo Goo Dolls and the New Radicals.

"Me & You Together Song" received positive reviews from contemporary music critics. Reviewers praised the song's nostalgic sound, lovelorn lyrics, and return to the more rock-oriented sound of their earlier work. It later appeared on several year-end lists. The song was a moderate commercial success, both internationally and in the 1975's native United Kingdom. It peaked at number five on the U.S. Billboard Hot Rock & Alternative Songs chart, number 17 on the U.S. Billboard Alternative Airplay chart, number 21 in New Zealand, and number 46 in Ireland. Domestically, the song reached number 35 in Scotland and number 35 on the UK Singles Chart. A music video directed by Bedroom was released on 6 February 2020. An homage to 1990s-era videos, it depicts various couples kissing in interconnected bedrooms while the 1975 performs at a house party. A second music video, shot in a black and white panoramic style, was released on 6 May 2020.

== Background ==
"A lot of our hardcore fans emotionally relate to our EPs and see them as our first albums, so it's nice that we've ended up back there [...] I think the whole record is like that, and ["Me & You Together Song"] is a stark example of that idea."

— Healy, on the song's nostalgia.

"Me & You Together Song" was originally conceived for the soundtrack of German, a film Healy planned on making. He wrote the song with Amy Watson and Chelsea Pollard in mind, attempting to capture the idealism of a teenage romance. He used humour in its lyrics to convey his sincerity, finding it difficult to be "soppy" and instead used gags to express his affection. Healy also sought to incorporate the dream-like, hazy and "quite broken and deconstructed" qualities of their early EPs into the song. Elaborating further, the singer said: "Our favourite music is music that's kind of inherently beautiful. It's not pretty but kind of fractured or a bit jangly or overly distorted". In October 2019, Healy previewed the song on Zane Lowe's Beats 1 show and described it as "really lovely" but sad. He also revealed his apprehensiveness about releasing it as a single, worrying that fans would not understand the album's overall sound since it was not finished at the time. In an interview with Lowe's colleague Matt Wilkinson, Healy said the band sought to emanate the sound of their early music–performed under the moniker Drive Like I Do–specifically the "purity" of their early lyrical expressions. On 7 January 2020 the singer announced the song's release on Instagram for the following week. On the day of the song's official release, 16 January 2020, the 1975 performed "Me & You Together Song" on the BBC Radio 1 show Annie Mac's Hottest Record in the World.

== Music and lyrics ==
"Me & You Together Song"
A 20-second sample of "Me & You Together Song", where Healy fantasizes of creating a domestic life with his love.

Composed in the styles of dream pop and pop rock, "Me & You Together Song" is a power ballad that runs for a length of three minutes and twenty-seven seconds (3:27). According to sheet music published at Musicnotes.com by Sony/ATV Music Publishing, "Me & You Together Song" is set in the time signature of common time with a tempo of 108 beats per minute. The track is composed in the key of A major, with Healy's vocals ranging between the notes of F#3 to E4. It follows a chord progression of D–Dsus2/F#–Bm7–Dsus2/A–D/G–Dsus2/F#–D/G–Dsus2/F#–Dsus2/E–D/E. It incorporates elements from a variety of different genres including shoegaze, post-Britpop, indie pop, indie rock, pop rock, pop punk and jangle pop. The song features a nostalgic and retro soft rock production evocative of 1990s rock music, composed of echoing, jangly pop rock guitars, dreamy guitar riffs, rumbling bass, clanging keyboards and bouncy, thunderous drums. "Me & You Together Song" has a unique song structure, with Mitch Mosk of Atwood Magazine describing it as "a three and a half minute chorus" and Brendan Wetmore of Paper commenting that the song was "full-blast and full-volume".

"Me & You Together Song" is a melancholic and sonically nihilistic love song that deals with unrequited affection, rejection and heartbreak. Lyrically, it describes falling in love with a friend who does not feel the same. Healy details their first interaction ("I can't remember when we met because she didn't have her top on / I improvised a little bit, she said my references were 'spot on'"), building up the courage to ask her on a date ("I said 'can I take you for a drink?' / She said 'oh god, I'll have to think'"), an outing at the Hyde Park Winter Wonderland ("We went to Winter Wonderland / And it was shit but we were happy"), and dreaming of creating a domestic life together ("I had a dream where we had kids / You would cook and I'd do the nappies"). In the chorus, Healy sings: "I've been in love with her for ages / And I can't seem to get it right / I fell in love with her in stages, my whole life". The singer also addresses his sexuality in the lines "I'm sorry that I'm kinda queer, it's not as weird as it appears / It's 'cause my body doesn't stop me / Oh, it's okay, lots of people think I'm gay / But we're friends, so it's cool, why would it not be?".

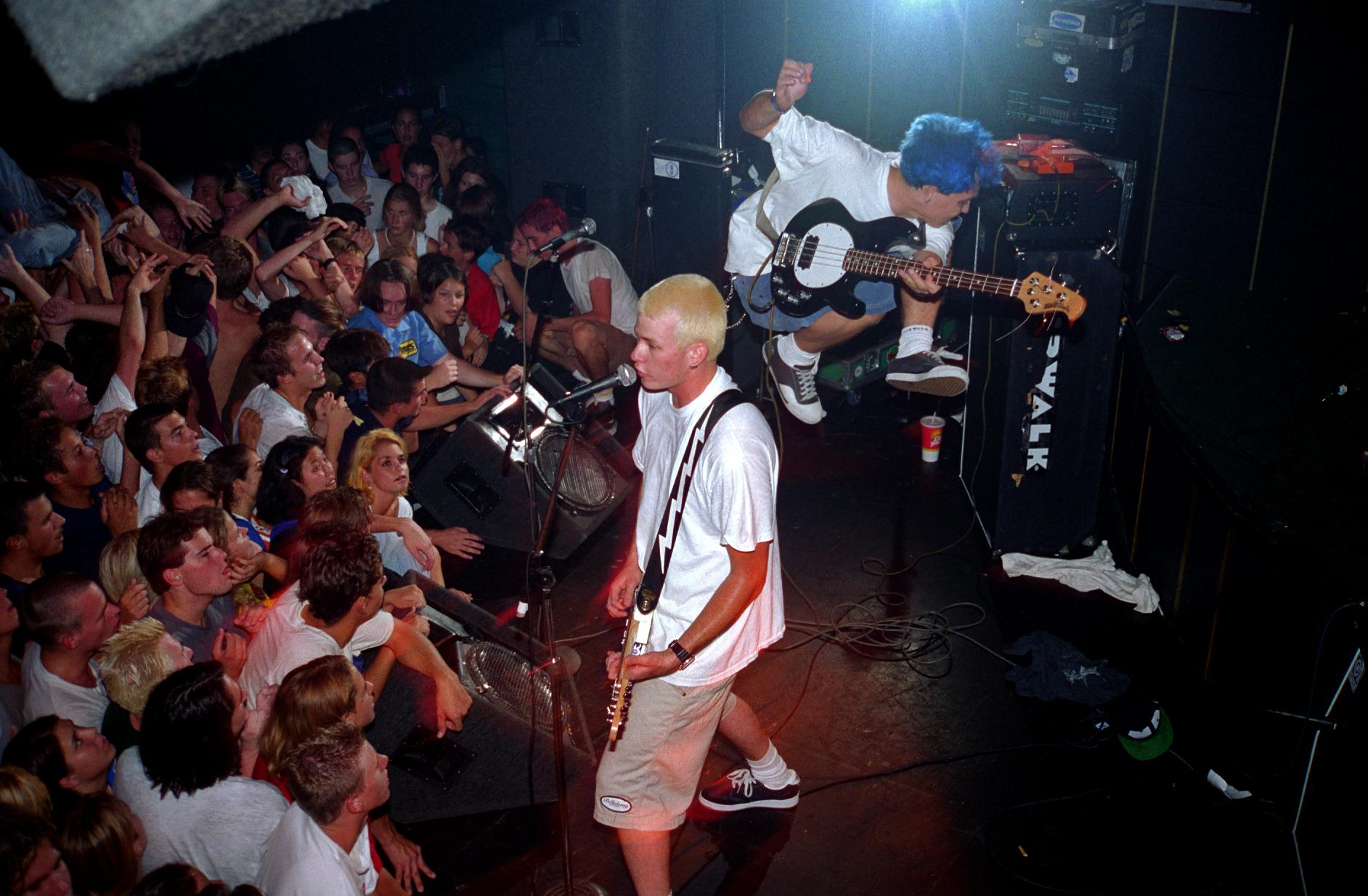
Critics compared the song to 1990s and early 2000s rock bands, such as Blink-182 (pictured).

Ross Horton of musicOMH compared the track to Blink-182 and the Goo Goo Dolls. Ben Neisen of Atwood Magazine observed similarities to 1990s "supermarket rock" songs such as Spin Doctors' "Two Princes" (1993), Hanson's "MMMBop" (1997), the New Radicals' "You Get What You Give" (1998), and Tal Bachman's "She's So High" (1999). Gil Kaufman of Billboard described "Me & You Together Song" as "buoyant" and "dreamy", commenting that the song's lyrics describe "a series of scenes from a cinematic love story". Ryan Leas of Stereogum said "Me & You Together Song" contained a "shimmery, autumnal pop sound that feels like it could've soundtracked the credits of some '90s rom-com about twentysomethings in the city". Wetmore noted that despite the song's outwardly upbeat sound, it was filled with longing that "[makes] love and longing a point of contention rather than celebration". Similarly, Stephen Ackroyd of Dork said that "Me & You Together Song" was not a traditional love song. Instead, Ackroyd wrote that it dealt with the idea of a potential relationship told through intense, passionate moments and sad recollections of a lost lover. Jessica Goddard of Platform observed a dual meaning in the song, saying: "On the surface, the song resembles a love letter to an unknown person, however, the single is actually about frontman Matty Healy's inner conflict with his sexuality and how it is perceived by others".

== Reception ==
Upon the release of "Me & You Together Song", Contemporary music critics reacted favourably to its nostalgic production, heartfelt lyrics, and return to a more rock-oriented sound. It later appeared on several year-end lists. Larry Fitzmaurice of Entertainment Weekly deemed "Me & You Together Song" an album highlight and said it is "one of the finest slices of jangly guitar since defunct Liverpool indie-pop heroes the La's were still an active concern". In an Atwood Magazine roundtable review of Notes on a Conditional Form, Erica Garcia deemed the song an album highlight, while Mosk praised the "simple, effective storytelling". Smith of NME deemed "Me & You Together Song" a "winner", complimenting the songwriting and further calling it "devastatingly sincere [...] a satisfying and well-rounded listen". Elly Watson of DIY declared "Me & You Together Song" one of the band's finest songs. In his review of the parent album, Sam Sodomsky of Pitchfork called "Me & You Together Song" a "Britpop rom-com" and cited it as an example of Healy using "familiar, unglamorous intimacy" to portray relationships in his lyrics. The editorial staff at Wonderland included the song in their "Wonderlist"–a weekly highlights playlist–praising its summer vibes and commending the 1975 for "[heading] back to their roots with this simplified jangly ode to pure teen mates-turned-love".

Salvatore Maicki of The Fader called it "a jangly return to form". Sowing Season of Sputnikmusic noted similarities between the song and the band's own "It's Not Living (If It's Not with You)" (2018), commenting that it "swells with warmth and optimism". Chelsea Holecek of Soundigest compared "Me & You Together Song" to the 1975's eponymous debut studio album (2013), specifically the singles "Girls" (2013) and "Chocolate" (2013). She wrote that the song is "full of soul and real feelings" and commended the band for "traveling back to their original roots" and "their willingness to try something new". Ben Boddez of the Vancouver Weekly said "Me & You Together Song" is evocative of the band's early work and allowed the group to "flex their stadium-sized muscles", calling it "delightfully jangly" and "starry-eyed". Andrew Sacher of BrooklynVegan commented that the song evokes the band's work as Drive Like I Do. Dana Tetenburg of Euphoria echoed Sacher's Drive Like I Do comparison, commenting that its bright and "bubbly" composition is reminiscent of a teenage mixtape in an early 2000s film.

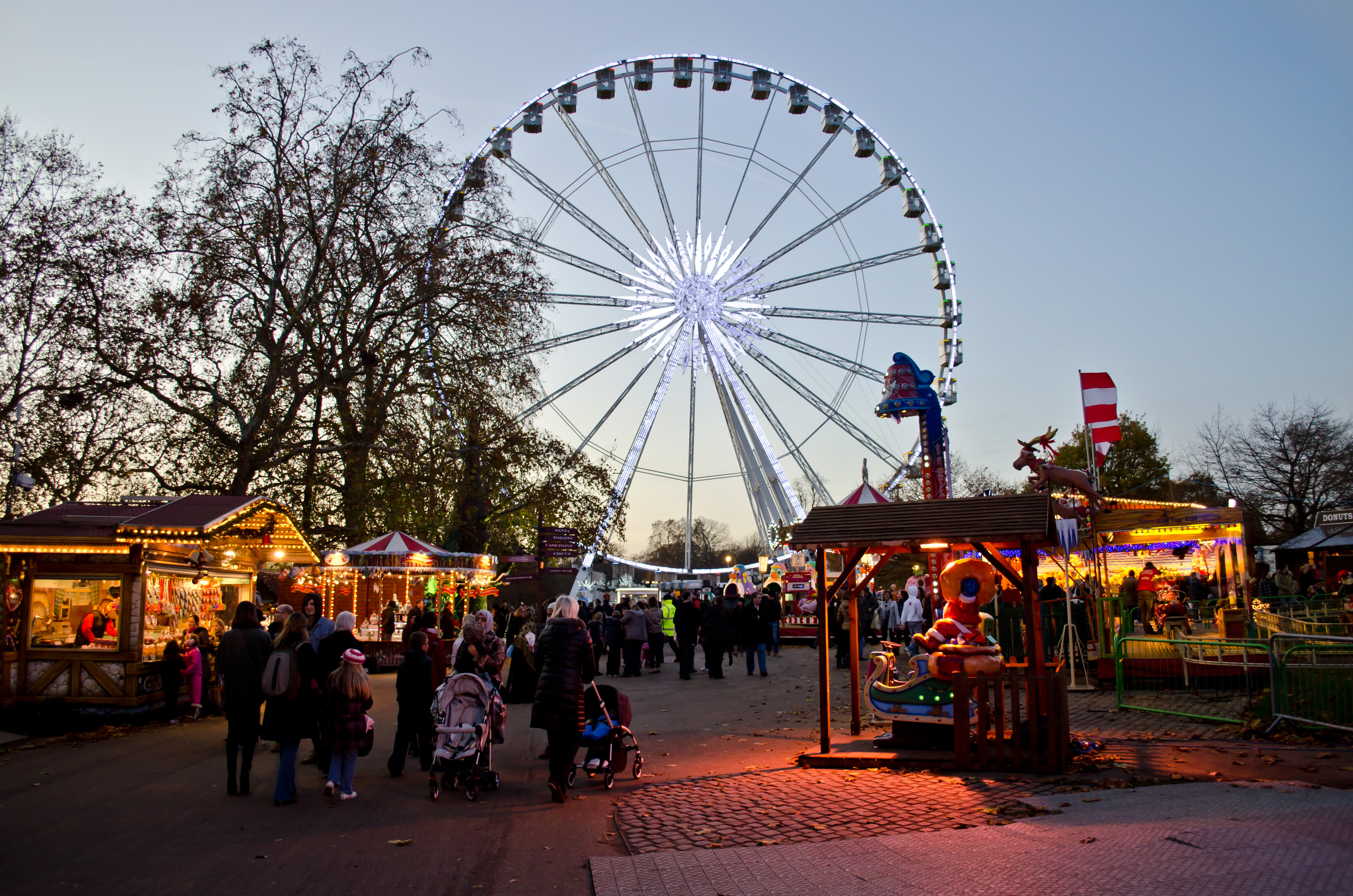
Several critics praised the song's reference to the Hyde Park Winter Wonderland (pictured).

Colin Lodewick of Pitchfork praised the "sparkling" production, comparing the song to "a storybook dream set inside a snow-globe [...] where the idea of having kids doesn't require contemplation of the disaster-struck world they may inhabit in the future". Jacob Reyes of the Dallas Observer commented that "Me & You Together Song" revisits the sound of early 2000s rock music, commenting that the lyrics: "could easily be the set up of a quirky high school comedy where the cool kids wore cargo pants and applied an excessive amount of gel in their hair." In his review of the song, Trey Alston of MTV News said: "If this were the mid-2000s, Adam Sandler would be chasing a lover's taxi to tell the woman inside that he loves her with this playing in the background". Joe Rivers of No Ripcord called the song a "peppy pop-rock number that seems to have come directly from the 10 Things I Hate About You [(1999)] soundtrack". Dan Stubbs of NME called the song "cutesy-pie" and complimented the "Winter Wonderland" line, saying it would be "keenly felt by anyone who's entered Hyde Park's festive circle of hell". Ben Allen of GQ deemed the Winter Wonderland reference one of the best lines from Notes on a Conditional Form, saying: "Have you ever been to Winter Wonderland? [...] It is, and we can't emphasize this enough, the worst [...] So for him to have had fun at Winter Wonderland with this girl… boy, she must have been the one".

Commercially, "Me & You Together Song" performed modestly on worldwide music charts. In the 1975's native United Kingdom, the song peaked at number 35 on the UK Singles Chart and number 30 in Scotland. Internationally, the song reached number five on the US Billboard Hot Rock & Alternative Songs chart, ranking at number 97 for its year-end edition. Elsewhere, it peaked at number 21 in New Zealand and number 46 in Ireland.

=== Year-end lists ===
Year-end lists for "Me & You Together Song"
Publication	Accolade	Rank	Ref.
Atwood Magazine	2020 Songs of the Year	—N/a	
Rachel Aroesti (The Guardian)	Albums and Tracks of 2020	—N/a	
Chris DeVille (Stereogum)	Stereogum's 60 Favorite Songs Of 2020	7	
Billboard	The 25 Best Rock Songs of 2020	6	
Cosmopolitan	Best Love Songs Of 2020	—N/a	
Rolling Stone India	Top 100 Songs Of 2020	60	
Kate Solomon (The Guardian)	Albums and Tracks of 2020	—N/a	
Thrillist	The Best Songs of 2020	—N/a	
Vanyaland	20 Favorite National Songs of 2020	—N/a	

== Music video ==
Scene from the "Me & You Together Song" music video. The attire of Healy and the guests, along with the furniture, wall colour, and posters drew comparisons to 1990s romantic comedy films.

A music video for "Me & You Together Song", directed by Bedroom, was released on 6 February 2020. Filmed in a retro style reminiscent of 1990s music videos, it includes homages to 1990s culture such as mix CDs, boomboxes, Converse, rooms covered in band posters, and retro T-shirts. The music video begins with a young woman inserting a CD mixtape into her boombox before dancing on her bed. The video pivots to a house party as the song progresses, while scenes of the band performing are interspersed. The bedrooms are shown to be interconnected, while at the same time the partygoers begin locking eyes with each other. As the couples in the bedrooms and the party begin making out, the 1975 are shown performing in the house and the partygoers gather around them. As the video concludes, the entire apartment in which the video takes place is shown to be built on a sound stage. Fellow Dirty Hit labelmate Beabadoobee makes a cameo in the video.

Evan Minsker of Pitchfork called the video a "rom-com throwback". Koltan Greenwood of the Alternative Press praised the video for "perfectly" capturing the nostalgia of the 1990s, saying everyone remembers "spotting [their] crush from across the dance floor", crashing over coffee tables, and "the first kiss shared with the one you love while you're trying to stay quiet in a separate room". Daniel Kreps of Rolling Stone complimented the "colourful" visuals, while Rhian Daly of NME called it nostalgic and said it "plays out like a '90s throwback". A second music video, filmed in black and white, was released on 6 May 2020. It features the 1975 performing in front of a stark white backdrop while a camera circles around the group, creating a panoramic effect.

== Credits and personnel ==
Credits adapted from Notes on a Conditional Form album liner notes.

- Matthew Healy – composer, producer, guitar, vocals
- George Daniel – composer, producer, programming, drums, keyboards
- Adam Hann – composer, guitar
- Ross MacDonald – composer, bass
- Jonathan Gilmore – producer, recording engineer
- Robin Schmidt – mastering engineer
- Mike Crossey – mixer

== Charts ==
=== Weekly charts ===
Weekly chart performance for "Me & You Together Song"
Chart (2020)	Peak position
Ireland (IRMA)	46
New Zealand Hot Singles (RMNZ)	21
Scottish Singles Sales (Official Charts)	30
UK Singles (Official Charts)	35
US Hot Rock & Alternative Songs (Billboard)	5
US Rock & Alternative Airplay (Billboard)	25

=== Year-end charts ===
2020 year-end chart performance for "Me & You Together Song"
Chart (2020)	Position
US Hot Rock & Alternative Songs (Billboard)	97

== Certifications ==
Certifications and sales for "Me & You Together Song"
Region	Certification	Certified units/sales
United Kingdom (BPI)	Silver	200,000^{‡}
^{‡} Sales+streaming figures based on certification alone.

== See also ==
- The 1975 discography
- List of songs by Matty Healy
