= Habitat (song) =

Single by Pinegrove

from the album 11:11
- Released: January 26, 2022
- Genre: Americana; indie rock
- Length: 6:56
- Label: Rough Trade
- Songwriter: Evan Stephens Hall
- Producers: Evan Stephens Hall; Sam Skinner

Pinegrove singles chronology
"Respirate" (2022)	"Habitat" (2022)

"Habitat" is a song recorded by the American rock band Pinegrove. The song was released on January 26, 2022, through Rough Trade, as the fourth single from the band's fourth studio album 11:11. It was written by singer-songwriter Evan Stephens Hall.

== Background ==
Much of 11:11 consists of concise, mid-tempo songs, save for its opener, "Habitat", which runs six minutes long. Hall intended for the song to function as an overture, introducing the listener to the album's concepts. It is both the oldest and most recent song recorded for the album: the song has roots in a mid-2010s demo that Hall re-discovered and wrote new lyrics to reflect his present feelings. The back half of "Habitat" is technically a different song according to the song's tablature, available on the band's website, titled "Precipice"; this piece was written in the studio to complement the original song. This section ends with Hall "Never forget, the t-shirt says/With no mask on." In a statement, Hall spoke on the song's meaning: "'Habitat' collages imagery from across the 2020's [sic]—monuments to the past torn down, vandalized, & thrown to the waves, making much needed room for new symbols to ornament our world with." In the song's opening lyrics, over acoustic guitar, Hall sings: "It’s so still, how’d you do that? You settled down my habitat." The song intermittently shifts to "angrier blasts of grungy guitar and drums." The song uses field recording of birds, as well as in-studio noise, such as "shifting feet, buttons or pedals, and amplifier hum."

In an interview, Hall expounded on these themes within "Habitat":

"Habitat" ended up being about all of the falling-apart homes in New York state; there are a lot of affluence that's coming to the area, but you go a little further and half of the town is boarded up. There are brand new cop cars driving around the town and buildings are literally caving in – so I think there's a serious contradiction there that needs to be addressed. I renovated that song to fit the present moment, and I like that song a lot because I feel like I was able to talk about how emotional it actually feels to see these policy decisions in practice. It's not some dry, technocratic thing: it’s people’s lives and their communities, and you can see it. That song talks about more than that, though — it’s also about time, and how big moments can stretch across the span of our history. It made me think of our civil rights movement in 2020, and how that started here with the murders of George Floyd and Breonna Taylor but ultimately funneled around the world because of the energy in that moment.

== Release and reception ==
Rough Trade issued "Habitat" as the fourth single from 11:11 on January 26, 2022, two days before the release of the album. That same day saw the debut of the song's music video, directed by Brian Paccione.

Ben Salmon at Paste interpreted the song as ruminating on American decline. Marcy Donelson of AllMusic praised Hall's "simultaneously poetic and direct way with words."

== Credits ==
Credits adapted from the album's liner notes.

Locations

- Recorded at Levon Helm Studios (Woodstock, New York); The Building (Marlboro, New York); Mex Tex Studios (Woodstock, New York); additional remote recording in home settings

Personnel

Pinegrove

- Evan Stephens Hall – additional engineering, drums, guitar, percussion, photography, production, songwriting, synthesizer, vocals
- Zack Levine – additional engineering, percussion, drums
- Joshua F. Marré – additional engineering, guitar, nylon string guitar, processed guitar, slide guitar
- Sam Skinner – accordion, bowed bass strings, electric bass, engineering, guitar, keyboards, organ, piano, production, songwriting, synthesizer, triangle
- Megan Benevente – additional engineering, electric bass

Additional musicians

- Nandi Rose – additional engineering, vocals
- Sammy Maine – photography, vocals
- Chris Walla – additional engineering, guitars, keyboards, mixing, tambourine
- Doug Hall – organ, synthesizer, piano

Technical

- João Carvalho – mastering
