= Intrepid (song) =

Single by Pinegrove

from the album Skylight
- Released: November 1, 2017
- Recorded: 2017
- Studio: Amperland (Kinderhook, New York)
- Genre: Americana; indie rock
- Length: 3:30
- Label: Run for Cover
- Songwriter: Evan Stephens Hall
- Producers: Evan Stephens Hall; Sam Skinner

Pinegrove singles chronology
"Cadmium" (2016)	"Intrepid" (2017)	"Moment" (2019)

"Intrepid" is a song recorded by American rock band Pinegrove. The song was released on November 1, 2017 through Run for Cover Records, as the lead single from the band's third studio album Skylight (2018). It was written by singer-songwriter Evan Stephens Hall; lyrically, the song examines love and distance in a global context.

"Intrepid" was widely acclaimed by contemporary music critics. It was their final single on Run for Cover, as the group exited the label the next year.

== Background ==
"Intrepid" is a "careful" meditation on relationships; specifically, it has been interpreted as about the "struggles and personal growth that come with long distance relationships." A press release accompanying the song's debut included a statement from Hall:

One of the things this album explores is the emotional and creative experience of geometric space. "Intrepid", in particular, considers distance and the outer rim of the magnet's pull; how the size of the world can bring our personal relationships into focus.

Timothy Monger at AllMusic characterized the song as "moody and slow-building." It uses a soft-loud sonic dynamic; midway through the song, it shifts from a quieter sound to an explosive, shouting chorus. The recording of the song was documented in the band's web series, Command + S, chronicling the making of Skylight.

== Reception ==
"Intrepid" was teased in live concerts prior to its official debut; they shared the song on social media platforms shortly after posting the last portion of their aforementioned Command + S series on November 1, 2017.

"Intrepid" was widely praised. Pitchfork's Sasha Geffen designated it "Best New Track", calling it a "powerful dose of catharsis." Billboard's Rob Arcand observed that "the track comes loaded with all the sort of ringing wordplay and unfettered enthusiasm that made their breakout Cardinal so memorable." Lars Gotrich at NPR extolled its "all-or-nothing performance, exploded just as far your eye can see the universe." Spin contributor Arielle Gordon considered it an advancement of their sound, commenting, "The winding, melodic guitar compliments [sic] the standard emo chord progressions in a back and forth that keeps the song feeling fresh until its subdued ending."

== Personnel ==
Credits adapted from Marigold's liner notes.

Pinegrove

- Evan Stephens Hall – guitar, vocals, percussion, production, mixing, cover art
- Zack Levine – drums, percussion, mixing

Additional personnel

- Josh Marré — guitar, dobro, lap steel guitar, vocals
- Nick Levine – guitar, pedal steel guitar
- Sam Skinner – guitar, engineer, mixing, production
- Nandi Rose Plunkett – vocals, keyboards, synthesizer
- Adan Carlo Feliciano – bass guitar
- Greg Calbi – mastering
