= The Birthday Party (song) =

Single by the 1975

from the album Notes on a Conditional Form
- Released: 19 February 2020
- Genre: Folk; country
- Length: 4:38
- Label: Dirty Hit; Polydor
- Songwriters: Matthew Healy; George Daniel; Adam Hann; Ross MacDonald
- Producers: Matthew Healy; George Daniel

The 1975 singles chronology
"Me & You Together Song" (2020)	"The Birthday Party" (2020)	"Jesus Christ 2005 God Bless America" (2020)

Music video
- "The Birthday Party" on YouTube

"The Birthday Party" is a song by English band the 1975 from their fourth studio album, Notes on a Conditional Form (2020). The song was released on 19 February 2020 by Dirty Hit and Polydor Records as the fourth single from the album. It was written by band members Matty Healy, George Daniel, Adam Hann and Ross MacDonald, while production of the song was handled by Daniel and Healy. Contributions are featured from Bob Reynolds, who plays the alto and tenor saxophone, and Rashawn Ross, who plays the trumpet and flugelhorn. The brass arrangements were composed by John Waugh, who performs the saxophone alongside Reynolds and Ross. The song originated from a jam session in Los Angeles, California, and was intended to be released as the lead single from the album, ultimately being replaced by "People" (2019).

"The Birthday Party" is an acoustic-driven folk and country ballad. The instrumentation blends gentle guitars, hazy drums, a lazy mid-tempo drum groove, flickering banjos, a xylophone and orchestral flourishes. In addition to the main genres, the song also draws from Britpop, electronic music, Americana, indie pop and country rock. It has an unconventional song structure, omitting a chorus in favour of a conversational, spoken word stream of consciousness delivery. The lyrics follow Healy's mundane experiences at a house party, recounting a series of awkward and uninteresting encounters he has with the other guests. Thematically, the song explores society's relationship with intoxication, the challenges of sobriety and issue avoidance.

"The Birthday Party" received generally mixed reviews from contemporary music critics. Praise was directed at the vulnerable lyrics and sonic experimentation, with some reviewers deeming it a highlight of Notes on a Conditional Form. Others were more negative, particularly about a line in the song that references allegations of sexual coercion levied against Pinegrove frontman Evan Stephens Hall. Commercially, the song achieved moderate success on worldwide music charts. It peaked at number 23 on the US Billboard Hot Rock & Alternative Songs chart, number 27 on the New Zealand Hot Singles chart, number 69 on the UK Singles Chart and number 86 in Ireland. An accompanying animated music video, directed by Ben Ditto and Jon Emmony, was released on 19 February 2020. The video follows Healy's journey through Mindshower—a digital detox centre—as he encounters various internet memes in a forest. The visual was well received by critics, with Pitchfork including it on their 20 Best Music Videos of 2020 list.

== Background and release ==
"I try and make art out of the boring, sad parts of my life, because it's better than them being boring and sad."

— Healy, on creating "The Birthday Party".

Speaking to Brendan Wetmore of Paste, Healy and Daniel revealed that "The Birthday Party", specifically the whispered vocal delivery, was heavily influenced by their earlier music recorded under the monicker of Drive Like I Do. The members also noted inspiration from Bright Eyes and Elliot Smith, with Healy telling Wetmore: "What was amazing about Bright Eyes was that he was kind of in an emo band, kind of pre-cursor band, then he was also part of a folk singer-songwriter kind of scene. He was kind of like, in between." Following the song's completion, the singer said it was the album's first track the 1975 was satisfied with and the "first thing that [they] got excited about". The song was originally intended to be released as the first single from Notes on a Conditional Form. However, after going on tour, the band wrote "People" (2019) and decided to make it the lead single instead. On 18 February 2020, the 1975 announced on Twitter that "The Birthday Party" would debut live on Zane Lowe's Beats 1 Radio show at 5 PM, followed by the music video one hour later. Following the release of "People", "Frail State of Mind" and "Me & You Together Song", "The Birthday Party" was officially released as the fourth single from Notes on a Conditional Form on 19 February 2020.

== Recording ==
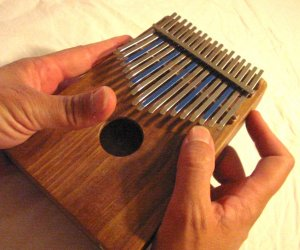
The synths used in "The Birthday Party" were created by combining a music box with a kalimba (pictured).

In August 2020, Healy and Daniel joined Hrishikesh Hirway for an episode of Song Exploder, where they deconstructed "The Birthday Party". The pair told Hirway that typically, either Healy or Daniel will brainstorm a basic song idea before bringing it to each other. However, the creation of "The Birthday Party" originated during an impromptu jam session in Los Angeles, California. It began with Healy playing a C-sharp on an acoustic guitar. He had an idea of making the bass "move around [the chord]", so MacDonald developed a repetitive bassline, followed by Daniel's layering in the drums. The band was focused on keeping the instrumentation "soft", wanting to maintain a "simple" and "pure" aesthetic. Daniel created an arpeggio using a Teenage Engineering OP-1, recording three octaves on a piano and importing it into the sampler. The result was a "clumsy" arpeggio performed in free time; caused from the sampler playing different pitches at varying speeds. To achieve their desired country western sound, Healy experimented with playing a slide guitar and a banjo. Next, Daniel layered in "trippy" and "psychedelic" synths, created by combining samples of a kalimba and a music box. Then, Healy and Daniel added conversational background atmospherics to give the song an intimate texture.

Thematically, Healy had an idea to make "The Birthday Party" about the social minutiae of house parties. He wanted to explore the different perspectives someone would have in their early, mid and late twenties. This idea was later scrapped, with Healy saying he had to write about "what it's like now, because my career has been what it's been like to be at a house party at 20, 25, and 29". Having relapsed and ended a long-term relationship shortly before creating the song, Healy sought to channel his emotions into the lyrics. The singer decide to frame the narrative of the song at a fictional house party, exploring the various conversations he would have. The female voices heard in "The Birthday Party" were planned to be recorded by an actual choir, but the 1975 chose to keep Healy's distorted vocals instead, finding them amusing. The band struggled to complete the song and wanted to create a single chorus as a "grand finale". They tried several versions but were unsatisfied with all of them, going on to dismiss the chorus idea and chose to add an instrumental finale instead, inviting John Waugh to create the brass arrangements. Unlike the softer aspects of the song, the 1975 wanted to make the saxophone "strangely aggressive". Lastly, Healy intended for the final lines of the song ("I depend / On my friends / To stay clean") to serve as a placeholder. He deemed them "depressing", but later decided the lyrics sounded like a natural conclusion to the final version of the song.

== Music and lyrics ==
"The Birthday Party"
A 27-second sample of "The Birthday Party" showcasing the song's unconventional structure and stream of consciousness lyrical delivery.

Musically, "The Birthday Party" is an acoustic-driven folk and country ballad, and has a length of four minutes and thirty-eight seconds (4:38). According to sheet music published at Musicnotes.com by Sony/ATV Music Publishing, "The Birthday Party" is set in the time signature of common time with a slow tempo of 67 beats per minute. The track is composed in the key of D major, with Healy's vocals–sung in his lower register–ranging between the notes of A2 and B3. It follows a chord progression of D–Em7sus–D/F#–Gsus2–A7sus. The song also draws from Britpop, electronic music, Americana, indie pop and country rock. The instrumentation uses gently-rolling guitars, hazy drums, a lazy mid-tempo drum groove, gentle, plucked, flickering banjos, a xylophone, orchestral flourishes and smooth saxophones. Bob Reynolds performs the alto and tenor saxophone, and Rashawn Ross plays the trumpet and flugelhorn. It has an unconventional impressionist song structure, with Healy delivering the lyrics in a conversational, spoken word stream of consciousness that details an internal monologue, characteristically found in country music. Ben Boddez of the Vancouver Weekly compared the song to the works of Father John Misty, while Kyle Kohner of Riff Magazine called "The Birthday Party" a "glitch-folk dreamscape", and Ryan Leas of Stereogum described it as a "deconstructed internet country ballad".

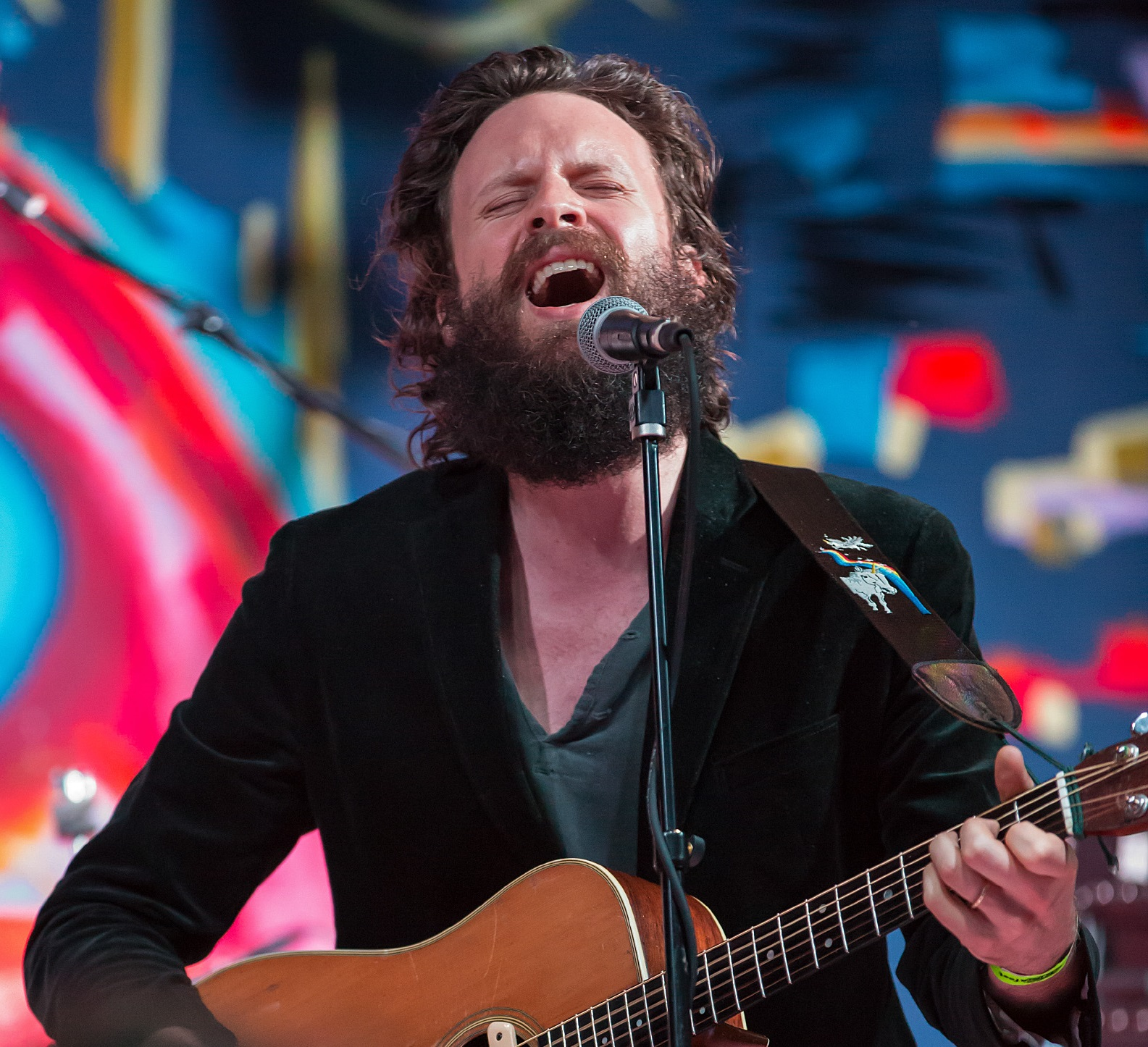
"The Birthday Party" drew comparisons to the work of Father John Misty (pictured).

Lyrically, Leas classified "The Birthday Party" as a "free-associative journey through relationships and sobriety", while fellow Stereogum writer Chris DeVille noted it "explores the quest to stay pure when hard drugs and illicit sex beckon and your favorite new band has been cancelled". The song is told through the perspective of Healy at a house party, recounting a series of awkward and uninteresting encounters he has with its various guests. Thematically, it deals with society's relationship with intoxication, the challenges of sobriety and issue avoidance. Paul Schrodt of Slant Magazine said the song sees "[Healy] amusingly coping with his ongoing addiction issues at a lame gathering". Barricade Magazine critic Shahin Rafikian identified underlying themes of friendship, intimacy, sociality and "admiration of life" in the track's lyrics. Ludovic Hunter-Tilney of the Financial Times wrote: "Like many a rock star before him, weak willpower is [Healy's] real frailty. Unlike those predecessors, however, he's self-aware."

"The Birthday Party" begins with country guitar slides and faintly strummed banjo chords. Healy sings about staying sober ("Now I'm clean it would seem") and wanting to attend a party ("Let's go somewhere I'll be seen"). At the party, Healy encounters a friend named Greg, who tells him: "I seen your friends at the birthday party / They were kinda fucked up before it even started". Greg mentions they were planning on attending a Pinegrove show but didn't know "about all the weird stuff" so they left. The line explicitly references the allegations of sexual coercion levied against Pinegrove frontman Evan Stephens Hall. A choir of robotic women asks Healy if he wants to "come and get fucked up?", but the singer rebuffs their advances, saying he is faithful to his "missus". The women respond by suggesting he take Adderall, claiming it will stop him from cheating. Next, he engages in a mundane conversation with a woman named Mel who tells Healy about her friend from Cincinnati, also named Matty. The singer mocks the partygoers perceived wealth ("Then drink your kombucha and buy an Ed Ruscha") and bemoans attending the gathering ("Look, the fucking state of it / I came pretty late to it"). As the song concludes, Healy reveals he only attended the party so his friends could ensure he does not relapse: "I depend / On my friends / To stay clean / As sad as it seems."

== Critical reception ==
Following its release, "The Birthday Party" was met with a mixed response from contemporary music critics. Deeming it the best track on the album, Rachel Hunt of The Diamondback praised the song's upbeat, witty and catchy nature, saying listeners "get an in-depth look into Matty Healy's inner dialogue concerning his love-hate relationship with fame and his shallow interactions with people". Gigwise declared "The Birthday Party" the 16th best song of 2020. Boddez deemed it an album highlight. He praised the thematic connections to "Frail State of Mind", humorous lyrics and "charming" vocals. Callie Ahlgrim and Courteney Larocca of Insider deemed "The Birthday Party" an album highlight, praising the "airy, chilled-out" production and sharp, perceptive lyrics. El Hunt of NME praised the 1975 for subverting genre expectations, calling it a "strange" and "slightly unwieldy experience". Similarly, Caitlyn McGonigal of Ascribe Magazine praised the song's sonic experimentation and the band's versatility, saying: "If there's a way to blend sounds together, they'll give it a try; if there isn't, then they'll invent a way to do it."

Ali Shutler and Stephen Ackroyd of Dork called the song genuine and sincere, saying it gives Notes on a Conditional Form a "warm, beating heart". Ross Horton of musicOMH called the song "lovely" and "heart-on-sleeve" sincere. Issy Murray of Exeposé praised the vulnerability of the lyrics, noting they provide an "intimate" insight into Healy's mind. Joe Rivers of No Ripcord praised the track for rewarding those who listened closely to the lyrics, saying it is "simply a woozy meander" on the surface, but a deeper listen reveals the true meaning: "the difficulty of resisting temptation". Leas called the song a "blearier-eyed update" of "Sincerity Is Scary" (2018), saying it contains more nuanced soundscapes than previous releases, "coming together in a kind of wan, late-night document of listless twentysomething life". Schrodt called the song "disarmingly blunt, even sobering". Matt Collar of AllMusic lauded Healy's "ability to convey seemingly earnest and diaristically candid emotions".

Rolling Stone writer Claire Shaffer gave the song a negative review, calling the "Pinegrove" line bizarre and awkward, while also criticising the length, saying: "did we really need a five-minute track to remind us that small talk at parties can be boring?" Similarly, Lizzie Manno of Paste called the line "cynical" and noted the 1975 failing to take a stance on the controversy, using it to show their knowledge of pop culture instead. Steven Hyden of Uproxx deemed the song a derivative and transparent Pinegrove homage, and also criticized the "Pinegrove" line. Matthew Dunn of Atwood Magazine said: "Healy wants us to know that he is aware of the Pinegrove sexual-assault allegations, but then, he just kind of [leaves it]." In her review of Notes on a Conditional Form for The A.V. Club, Annie Zaleski said several songs, including "The Birthday Party", contain topics which deserve deeper thought, specifically Healy's references to sobriety. In a separate "Ask A Music Critic" column for Uproxx, Steven Hyden gave the song a scathing review, calling it "a pale imitation of the emo-leaning folk of Pinegrove's own records, utterly weak and directionless". He derided the "Pinegrove" line, labelling it an attempt to fortify a brand image that portrayed the band as clever and relevant, "more akin to personal identity curation than (exceedingly half-baked) commentary". Commercially, "The Birthday Party" peaked at number 69 on the UK Singles Chart, number 86 in Ireland, number 23 on the US Billboard Hot Rock & Alternative Songs chart and number 27 on the New Zealand Hot Singles chart.

== Music video ==
=== Background and release ===
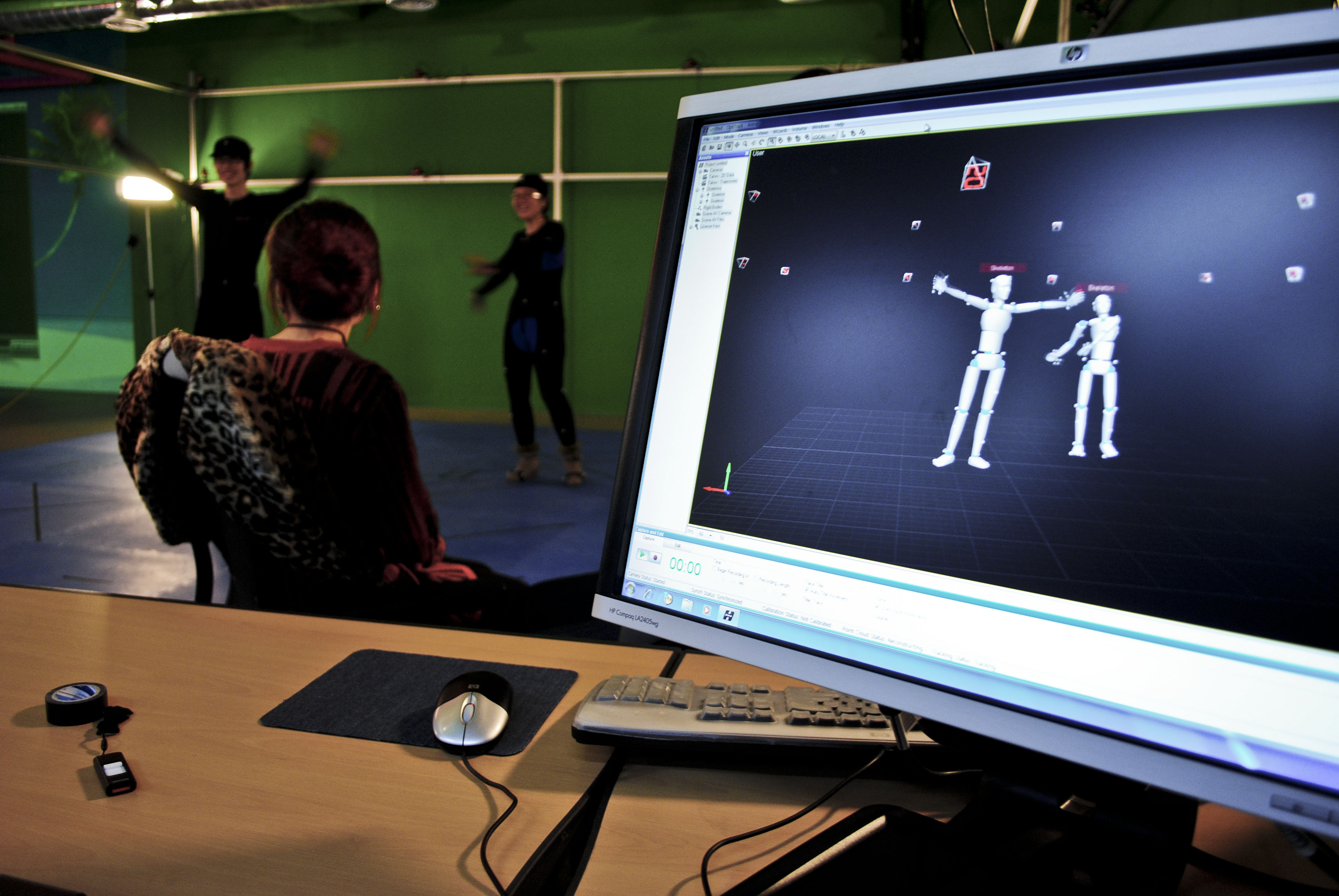
The 1975 filmed the visual using facial and body motion capture.

The music video for "The Birthday Party" was co-directed by Ben Ditto and Jon Emmony, with the latter also serving as the digital artist. Discussing his collaboration with the band, Ditto said: "It was truly inspiring to work with [t]he 1975 on this project, combining digital craft with true emotion and a subversive and multilayered narrative." The director said he and Healy shared a fascination with the "underbelly" of the internet and how it impacts modern life. They wanted to create a video that addressed this impact and showcased the 1975 "in a revolutionary way". Emmony worked alongside Mimic Productions to digitally recreate the band. They developed detailed 3D facial scans–including mouth movements–of each member using the same technology utilized in Avatar (2009). Then, Emmony and Mimic Productions filmed body and facial motion capture scenes over a three-day period.

Healy was inspired by computer philosopher Jaron Lanier, who postulated that humans need to domesticate the internet and create their own rules for using it. Healy was also inspired by incel culture. Specifically, the singer was fascinated by how internet memes, created with insidious intent on websites such as 4chan and Reddit, are quickly disseminated into mainstream culture. Speaking with Alex Peters of Dazed, Healy said: "[...] you'll see memes that actually originate from really dark, deep places, the underbelly of the internet but are now fodder for the masses." The band wanted to explore where memes such as Lil Miquela would go to relax, resulting in the idea of a digital detox centre located outside in nature. On 17 February 2020, a "digital detox" website, Mindshower.ai, was launched. The page contained a countdown, directions to press and booking emails, and messages such as "I am doing my mind and my life!", "I feel comfort and respect", "I go!" and "Peace back!" A Twitter account for the website was also created and Healy posted a photo on Instagram captioned, "MIND SHOWER". The music video for "The Birthday Party" was officially released on 19 February 2020.

=== Synopsis ===
The video begins with a title card reminiscent of the Care Bears. An animated Healy enters Mindshower—a digital detox centre—where he is introduced to a transparent floating figure. The singer hands the figure his cellphone before being transformed into an outfit resembling white pyjamas. A neon doorway appears, similar to the "box" used for the artwork on the 1975's EPs, their eponymous debut studio album (2013) and I Like It When You Sleep, for You Are So Beautiful yet So Unaware of It, revealing a new world populated by "meme-people". Healy encounters a group of "meme-people" including Pepe the Frog, Wojak and a Chad doing yoga. A 3D illustration of a smiley face with sunglasses, is shown as the sun. He is then shown surrounded by Derpina, a group of crying cats, Neckbeard and Earthchan–an anime-style globe anthropomorphized as a woman—lounging on a giant mushroom. Next, Healy sings alongside the Stonks character.

In the forest, an incel Virgin rapidly nails posters to the trees that read "looking for goth gf" above a photo of the Danny Phantom character Sam Manson. As the camera pans, a Pedobear emerges from behind a tree stump, while Dat Boi is shown riding his unicycle. Healy then appears in the clouds with Distracted Boyfriend before singing with Shrek, Momo and Ermahgerd Girl. The singer visits a pond in the forest, revealed to be a blue screen of death, and falls in. Once inside, his eyes glow red, resembling the Terminator, and he begins to floss. Next, Healy and the other members of the 1975 are shown performing in the sky. Scenes of the Virgin finding his "goth gf" and Healy kissing a clone of himself are shown and the remaining "meme-people" collapse in a circle as the band performs. As the video concludes, Healy skips off towards the moonlight while Tide Pods rain from the sky. The moon itself is revealed to be Moon Man, a meme used by the alt-right and labelled as a hate symbol by the Anti-Defamation League.

=== Critical reception ===
Koltan Greenwood of Alternative Press called the music video captivating and a "wild ride", observing a dystopian theme that deals with the divisive effects of social media: isolation and narcissism. His colleague Grant Sharples called the video bizarre and brilliant, ranking it at number 8 on his list of 10 Music Videos From the 1975 That Should Get Their Own Movies. DIY said the visual is surreal and praised its strange tone. Consequence of Sound writer Wren Graves gave the video a positive review, calling it "certainly impressive, even if it lingers in the Uncanny valley". Pitchfork included the video on their list of the 20 Best Music Videos of 2020, comparing it to the television show Black Mirror. Heran Mamo of Billboard called the music video "every sad meme lover's dream", noting the video serves as a commentary on how genuine human connection is impossible through technological means. Cosmopolitan writer Dyan Zarzuela felt it is a commentary on internet culture and extolled the "super trippy" visuals.

== Credits and personnel ==
Credits adapted from Notes on a Conditional Form album liner notes.

- Matthew Healy – composer, producer, banjo, guitar, vocals
- George Daniel – composer, producer, drums, vibraphone, keyboards, synthesizer
- Adam Hann – composer, guitar
- Ross MacDonald – composer, bass
- Lemar Guillary – trombone
- Bob Reynolds – alto saxophone, tenor saxophone
- Rashawn Ross – flugelhorn, trumpet
- John Waugh – saxophone
- Mike Crossey – mixer
- Jonathan Gilmore – recording engineer
- Robin Schmidt – mastering engineer

== Charts ==
Chart performance for "The Birthday Party"
Chart (2020)	Peak position
Ireland (IRMA)	86
New Zealand Hot Singles (RMNZ)	27
UK Singles (Official Charts)	69
US Hot Rock & Alternative Songs (Billboard)	23

== See also ==
- The 1975 discography
- List of songs by Matty Healy
