= Geneva Glen Camp =

- Established: 1922; 104 years ago
- Coordinates: 39.61577°N 105.24098°W
- Budget: $2.5 million (2021)
- Website: genevaglen.org

Geneva Glen Camp is a co-educational, non-profit, residential summer camp located in Indian Hills, Colorado. Geneva Glen Camp is accredited by the American Camp Association.

== Location ==
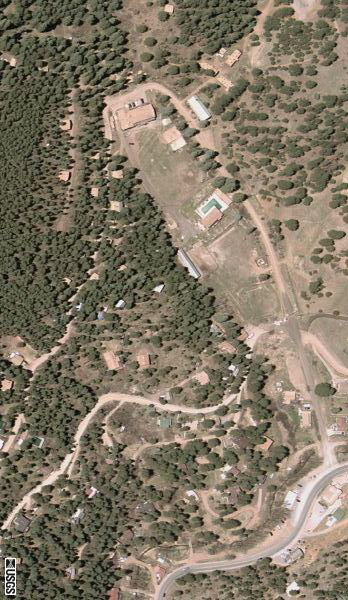
Overhead image of the camp

Geneva Glen Camp is located in the foothills about 20 miles (32 km) southwest of Denver, Colorado on nearly 500 acres (200 ha) of coniferous forest.

=== Geneva Glen columbine ===
An unusual variety of columbine flower is named after the camp. The spurless Geneva Glen columbine (Aquilegia caerulea daileyae Estw.) has an all-blue star flower and lacks the traditional white cup in the middle. While it was documented as early as 1894 in nearby Evergreen, the variety is named for the camp after being documented adjacent to the camp director's cabin in 1931.

== History ==
Geneva Glen Camp was established in 1922 on 100 acres (40 ha) donated by developer George Olinger to the International Sunday School Association. The camp was intended to be used for high school and college-aged youth and training for Sunday school teachers. Geneva Glen became the third of the association's camps, joining camps on Geneva Lake in Wisconsin and Geneva Point in New Hampshire.

The Denver Council of Churches assumed the camp's mortgage in 1930. Through the 1930s, the camp hosted 3- and 4-day camps for local youth organizations such as 4-H.

By the 1950s, Geneva Glen Camps ran interdenominational summer camp programs for boys and girls ages 8 – 15, later expanded to ages 7 – 17. The nonprofit organization Geneva Glen Camp, Inc. operates the camp.

== Camp programs ==
Geneva Glen Camp serves about 240 campers in each of its two-week sessions. The camp offers themed sessions including (in order) Seedlings & Stardust, Myths & Magic, American Heritage, Knighthood 1, Knighthood 2, and World Friendship, as well as several family sessions. Each session has different activities for campers to participate in including archery, horseback riding, swimming, arts & crafts, rifles, BB guns, and hiking. During the off-season, Winter Workshop is a four-day three night session offered in December for veteran campers in 9th - 11th grades.

== Notable alumni ==
- Evan Stephens Hall, singer-songwriter
