= 11:11 (Pinegrove album) =

Studio album by Pinegrove
- Released: January 28, 2022
- Studios: Levon Helm Studios (Woodstock, New York); The Building (Marlboro, New York)
- Genres: Americana; emo; indie rock
- Length: 38:58
- Label: Rough Trade
- Producers: Evan Stephens Hall; Sam Skinner

Pinegrove chronology
Amperland, NY (2021)	11:11 (2022)

Singles from 11:11
- 1. "Orange" Released: August 25, 2021; 2. "Alaska" Released: November 11, 2021; 3. "Respirate" Released: January 6, 2022; 4. "Habitat" Released: January 26, 2022

11:11 is the fifth studio album by Pinegrove, released through Rough Trade Records on January 28, 2022. The album was produced by the band's frontman, singer-songwriter Evan Stephens Hall, as well as guitarist Sam Skinner. It is the final album to feature drummer Zack Levine, who left the band in April 2023. For their next effort, the group eschewed their typical home settings for a proper studio for the first time, aiming for a less restrained approach to recording. To this end, they enlisted their first outside collaborator to mix the album—Chris Walla, best known for his work with Death Cab for Cutie.

Much of the album was tracked at two upstate New York locations, with some remote work necessary as a result of the COVID-19 pandemic. Lyrics on the album touch on those hardships, but mainly center on environmental issues and governmental inaction. Its palindromic title returns to the band's interest in symmetry, with its green-colored artwork harkening back to its ecological themes. Upon its release, it received favorable reviews, with critics complimenting its lyrical messages and musicianship.

== Background ==
The album was largely recorded at a pair of upstate New York facilities: the Building in Marlboro and at Levon Helm Studios in Woodstock, an 18-acre complex named for the former drummer of the Band. It was the group's first proper "studio" recording, as all previous releases were recorded in home settings. The band began recording the album in September 2020, in the midst of the ongoing COVID-19 pandemic. Hall, Levine, and Skinner convened at Levon Helm to record basic tracks, with several other contributors stopping by for a day at a time to contribute.11:11 is the first album by the band to feature contributions from bassist Megan Benavente, who recorded her sections remotely from Los Angeles. She digitally sent the team her improvisational bass parts, which the band "cobbled together [into] something very interesting and melodic," according to Hall.

While previous Pinegrove releases were mixed by Sam Skinner, the band sought a "messier" approach to the sonic texture of 11:11, in contrast to more polished production of the past. To this end, they enlisted producer and former Death Cab for Cutie member Chris Walla, who oversaw mixing of the album at his Seattle studio. In a press statement, Hall summarized the album's themes: "It spends equal time on optimism, community, reaffirming our human duty to look out for one another even in the absence of the people we expect to do those things. What if we have to be our own salvation?"

The band issued "Orange", the first single from 11:11, on August 25, 2021; an album announcement and pre-order took place on November 11 (or 11:11), alongside the release of second single "Alaska".

== Themes and artwork ==
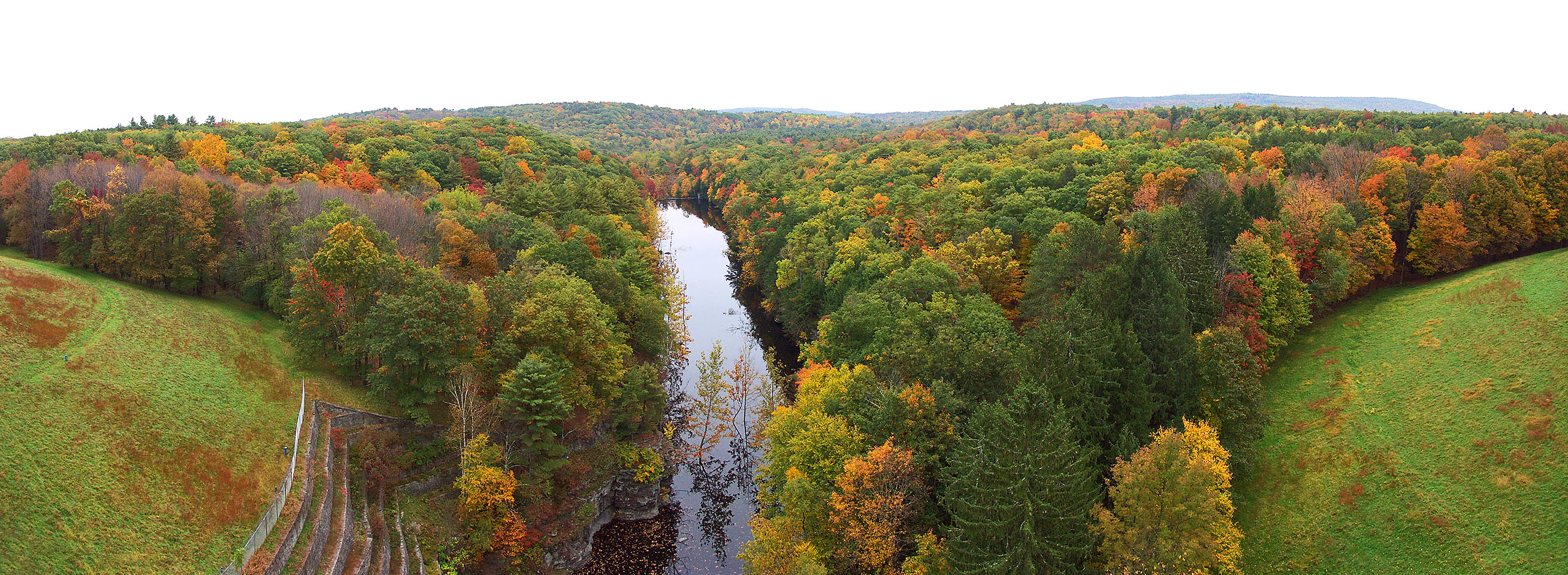
Throughout the album, Hall makes reference to nature; pictured is the Ashokan Reservoir in New York.

Singer-songwriter Evan Stephens Hall composed 11:11 at what he called "a real inflection point in my life, where politics became less of a discrete and separate category and more of a superimposition over every aspect of living." Specifically, Hall had grown frustrated with political inaction with regard to racial unrest, mismanagement of the pandemic, and the climate crisis. Consequently, much of 11:11 focuses thematically on the natural world, both celebrating its beauty and destruction at the hands of humanity.

Much of 11:11 consists of concise, mid-tempo songs, save for its opener, "Habitat", which runs six minutes long. Hall intended for the song to function as an overture, introducing the listener to the album's concepts. "Alaska" takes place on an airplane operated by a sleeping pilot, flying diagonally across America. The narrator describes grids of trees and cornfields repeating like numerical patterns. Hall described the song as a pre-emptive mourning of these landscapes in the context of escalating climate change. He likened the "strangely liminal space" of an aircraft cabin "a metaphor for how time has felt" during the pandemic. "Orange" more directly tackles these issues, with its title referring to the smoke-filled hue given to skies over the state of Oregon due to wildfires. It expresses frustration at government passivity, with Hall calling "to affirm community, to step in and help one another cope in the absence of our government, and take seriously the need to organize for a better world." Hall mulls over the pandemic's effect on everyday life in "Respirate", while "Flora" finds the narrator taking a walk in the woods, observing that "nothing's shining like I feel like it should."

The album's title is a palindrome, and its cover artwork depicts the title superimposed between squares; both concepts reflects the band's long-held interest in symmetry and geometry. While previous Pinegrove album artwork follow primary colors (according to a color wheel), the sleeve of 11:11 marks a move towards secondary colors, in this case green. Hall adopted the concept from fans speculating online in the lead-up to the album's release, recognizing that it creatively worked within themes the album already explores, namely the climate crisis. Madeline Crone at American Songwriter felt that the visual of the title itself evokes a row of pine trees.

== Reception ==
Professional ratings
Aggregate scores
Source	Rating
Metacritic	73/100
Review scores
Source	Rating
AllMusic	4/5 stars
Paste	7.8/10
Pitchfork	7.1/10
PopMatters	6/10
Under the Radar	7.5/10 stars

11:11 was met with generally favorable reviews. At Metacritic, which assigns a normalized rating out of 100 to reviews from professional publications, the album received an average score of 73, based on nine reviews.

Marcy Donelson at AllMusic gave it four stars, writing, "Throughout shifts in tempo, density, and electrification, Hall's bittersweet melodies are as affecting as his internal rhymes." Paste's Ben Salmon specifically praised its harmonies and slide guitar work, considering 11:11 an addition to Pinegrove's "impressive catalogue" of "reliably twangy, heart-on-sleeve rock 'n' roll." Mark Moody at Under the Radar called it the group's "most urgent" and focused collection, while Hayden Merrick of PopMatters complimented its "urgency and sincerity," considering its focus on nature a welcome respite from emo's typical subject matter. Pitchfork reviewer Peyton Thomas found the album "open-armed [and] inclusive, with instrumentation echoing comfort-food folk and the rootsier elements of recent indie rock."

== Track listing ==
All tracks are written by Evan Stephens Hall, except "Let", written by Evan Stephens Hall with Sam Skinner.

11:11 track listing
No.	Title	Length
1.	"Habitat"	6:55
2.	"Alaska"	2:05
3.	"Iodine"	5:10
4.	"Orange"	4:29
5.	"Flora"	2:47
6.	"Respirate"	2:50
7.	"Let"	3:25
8.	"So What"	2:31
9.	"Swimming"	3:31
10.	"Cyclone"	2:57
11.	"11th Hour"	2:18
Total length:		38:58

== Personnel ==
Credits adapted from the album's liner notes.

Locations

- Recorded at Levon Helm Studios (Woodstock, New York); The Building (Marlboro, New York); Mex Tex Studios (Woodstock, New York); additional remote recording in home settings

Personnel

Pinegrove

- Evan Stephens Hall – additional engineering, cover painting, design, drums, guitar, percussion, photography, production, songwriting, synthesizer, vocals
- Zack Levine – additional engineering, percussion, drums
- Joshua F. Marré – additional engineering, guitar, nylon string guitar, processed guitar, slide guitar
- Sam Skinner – accordion, bowed bass strings, co-mixing on "Orange" and "11th Hour", electric bass, engineering, guitar, keyboards, organ, piano, production, songwriting, synthesizer, triangle
- Megan Benevente – additional engineering, electric bass

Additional musicians

- Nandi Rose – additional engineering, vocals
- Sammy Maine – photography, vocals
- Chris Walla – additional engineering, guitars, keyboards, mixing, tambourine
- Doug Hall – organ, synthesizer, piano

Technical

- João Carvalho – mastering
- Mira Moore – design

== Charts ==
Chart performance for 11:11
Chart (2022)	Peak position
UK Independent Albums (Official Charts)	35
US Heatseekers Albums (Billboard)	3
US Top Album Sales (Billboard)	29
