= Bedroom (video directors) =

British music video director duo

Soren Harrison and Amir Hossain
- Other name: A Bedroom Project
- Occupation: Directors
- Years active: 2018–present
- Known for: Music videos

Bedroom is the British music video direction team of Soren Harrison and Amir Hossain. They have directed videos for acts that include The 1975's "Me & You Together Song", Arlo Parks's "Pegasus" (ft. Phoebe Bridgers), and Måneskin's "Supermodel". They credit all work as "A Bedroom Project", and many of the artists they work with create music in the bedroom pop genre.

The duo also directed ten videos for Beabadoobee, with whom Harrison was in a relationship until 2022. Harrison is the inspiration for her songs "Soren" and "Horen Sarrison". Harrison co-wrote her song "Care", for which Bedroom directed the video.

Harrison and Hossain met at secondary school in West London and began making videos together when they were both aged 13. As well as music videos, they have directed videos for brands like Converse, ASOS, and Doc Martens.

== Filmography ==
=== Music videos ===
Year	Title	Artist(s)	Ref.
2018	"Susie May"	Beabadoobee	
2018	"Dance With Me"	Beabadoobee	
2018	"If You Want To"	Beabadoobee	
2018	"Disappear"	Beabadoobee	
2019	"She Plays Bass"	Beabadoobee	
2019	"I Wish I Was Stephen Malkmus"	Beabadoobee	
2020	"Me & You Together Song"	The 1975	
2020	"Care"	Beabadoobee	
2020	"Sorry"	Beabadoobee	
2020	"Worth It"	Beabadoobee	
2020	"Together"	Beabadoobee	
2020	"Rest Up"	Boy Pablo	
2020	"Leave Me Alone!"	Boy Pablo	
2020	"Wachito Rico"	Boy Pablo	
2021	"Too Good"	Arlo Parks	
2021	"I Don't Wanna Know"	Willow Kayne	
2021	"Opinion"	Willow Kayne	
2022	"Supermodel"	Måneskin	
2022	"Vest & Boxers"	Lava La Rue	
2022	"Plastic Purse"	Chloe Moriondo	
2023	"Pegasus"	Arlo Parks featuring Phoebe Bridgers	
2023	"Blades"	Arlo Parks	
2024	"Eyes Wide Shut"	Alfie Templeman	
2024	"Darkest Lullaby"	Kasabian	
2025	"Guilty"	Teddy Swims	
2025	"Off The Rails"	Benee	
