= Jesus Christ 2005 God Bless America =

Single by the 1975

from the album Notes on a Conditional Form
- Released: 2 April 2020
- Recorded: 2019
- Genre: Folk; acoustic
- Length: 4:24
- Label: Dirty Hit; Polydor
- Songwriters: Matthew Healy; George Daniel; Adam Hann; Ross MacDonald
- Producers: Matthew Healy; George Daniel

The 1975 singles chronology
"The Birthday Party" (2020)	"Jesus Christ 2005 God Bless America" (2020)	"If You're Too Shy (Let Me Know)" (2020)

Official audio
- "Jesus Christ 2005 God Bless America" on YouTube

"Jesus Christ 2005 God Bless America" is a song by English band the 1975 from their fourth studio album, Notes on a Conditional Form (2020). The song was written by band members Matty Healy, George Daniel, Adam Hann and Ross MacDonald, while Daniel and Healy handled the song's production. It was released on 2 April 2020 by Dirty Hit and Polydor Records as the fifth single from the album. The song features guest vocals from singer-songwriter Phoebe Bridgers. Healy re-wrote the song several times, focusing on the prison–industrial complex and the religious oppression of young people, while the final version was created as a patchwork from each iteration. After meeting Bridgers, the band invited her to record vocals for the song, turning it into a duet.

Musically, "Jesus Christ 2005 God Bless America" is a minimalist folk and acoustic ballad containing elements of lo-fi, emo and alternative country music. The song features a soft, sparse and stripped-down production, composed primarily of Acoustic guitars, electronic textures, quiet drums, distorted horns, saxophones, brass flourishes and synthesized strings. Lyrically, it is written from the perspective of two closeted religious individuals struggling with an internal conflict between religion, sexual orientation, and personal identity. The song explores themes of heartbreak, faith, sexuality, love, vulnerability, defeat and fragility.

"Jesus Christ 2005 God Bless America" was released to positive reviews from contemporary music critics, who praised the song's emotionally-charged lyrics, composition and the inclusion of Bridgers. Commercially, the single peaked at number 11 on the New Zealand Hot Singles chart, number 38 on the US Billboard Hot Rock & Alternative Songs chart, number 83 in Ireland and number 88 on the UK Singles Chart. To promote "Jesus Christ 2005 God Bless America", the band commissioned Spanish dancer and choreographer Candela Capitán to create a short art film as part of the Artists Respond to NOACF online exhibition. Upon release, the video incited controversy due to its explicit nature and was quickly removed from Facebook and Instagram.

== Background and recording ==
"It hints towards things, that's what's interesting about it [...] It's about America, and the things I drive past there, I love America and spend so much time looking out on its coolness and its beauty, but there's also bits that make me shiver a little bit. It's about those things."

— Healy, during an interview with Ben Homewood of Music Week.

In April 2017, the 1975 announced Music for Cars, the follow-up record to their second studio album, I Like It When You Sleep, for You Are So Beautiful yet So Unaware of It (2016), which was set to be released in 2018. In August 2017, Healy teased "Jesus Christ 2005 God Bless America" on his Instagram account as part of the album. However, in May 2018, Healy announced that Music for Cars would now represent an "era" composed of two studio albums. The first, A Brief Inquiry into Online Relationships (2018), was released in November of the same year and did not include "Jesus Christ 2005 God Bless America". The band recorded the majority of the second album, Notes on a Conditional Form, in 2019 during their Music for Cars Tour, intending to release it in May 2019. Ultimately, Notes on a Conditional Form was released on 22 May 2020.

"Jesus Christ 2005 God Bless America" went through several iterations and rewrites before the group arrived at the final version. Healy told Ben Homewood of Music Week that the original version, which focused on a singular subject, was scrapped. He rewrote the song to focus on the prison–industrial complex. Dissatisfied, Healy reworked the song again to address the effects of religious oppression on young people "regardless of sexuality". Ultimately, Healy told Homewood that he created the final version using his favourite lines from each iteration. In this regard, the singer viewed "Jesus Christ 2005 God Bless America" as the "ultimate [Notes on a Conditional Form] song"; having been composed through a patchwork of various notes. Healy contrasted the song with "Love It If We Made It" (2018) from A Brief Inquiry into Online Relationships (2018). The singer noted that unlike the explicit messaging presented in "Love It If We Made It" (2018), he deliberately made "Jesus Christ 2005 God Bless America" more ambiguous with its subject matter. In April 2019, the 1975 performed the song live on the Las Vegas radio station KXTE.

Bridgers, a fan of the 1975 and Daniel's friend, began exchanging "mutually appreciative" Instagram messages with Healy. Having written the final version of "Jesus Christ 2005 God Bless America", the 1975 invited Bridgers to help record textures and harmonies for the song. In an October 2019 interview with Salvatore Maicki of The Fader, the singer revealed she was travelling to England to record with the band, saying: "We haven't met before, we have only internet-ted. I know him a little bit and I'm excited. I love their turnaround time, it's fucking great. That's, like, true punk rock". Speaking to Carolina Gonzalez of Vogue regarding his collaboration with Bridgers, Healy said their work came about organically, and told Jeremy Gordon of The Face that she contributed a "country-emo Americana element". Having heard the final version with Bridgers' vocals, the band was so impressed that they decided to work with the singer on three additional songs for Notes on a Conditional Form (2020): "Then Because She Goes" (2020), "Roadkill" (2020) and "Playing on My Mind" (2020). On 30 March 2020, Healy announced that "Jesus Christ 2005 God Bless America" would be released as the album's fifth single on 2 April 2020.

== Music and lyrics ==
"Jesus Christ 2005 God Bless America"
A 24-second sample of "Jesus Christ 2005 God Bless America" showcasing the song's final chorus, with Healy and Bridgers singing in harmony.

"Jesus Christ 2005 God Bless America" has a length of four minutes and 24 seconds. Musically, it is a minimalist folk and acoustic ballad that incorporates elements of lo-fi, emo and alternative country music. Dork writer Martyn Young described the song as "very much lo-fi country in the vein of artists like Bright Eyes", while Jordan Blum of PopMatters called the track an "existential folk duet". "Jesus Christ 2005 God Bless America" features a soft, sparse, stripped-down production containing gentle, windy atmospherics and electronic textures composed primarily of vocals and acoustic guitars. Its instrumentation is built on quiet drums, "distant and haunting" distorted horns and saxophones, brass flourishes, and synthesized strings. NME contributor Ali Shutler called it the band's simplest song since "Nana" (2016) from I Like It When You Sleep, for You Are So Beautiful yet So Unaware of It (2016), and felt the song's sparseness "allows the weighty lyrics room to fully flex". Rachel Hunt of The Diamondback noted the track's production and religious themes were similar to "If I Believe You" (2016) from I Like It When You Sleep, for You Are So Beautiful yet So Unaware of It (2016) and shared the same social criticism explored in "Love It If We Made It" (2018) from A Brief Inquiry into Online Relationships (2018). Jessie Atkinson of Gigwise called it "full mid-noughties, sad-girl folk" and compared the single's blend of folk and electronic music to the works of Bon Iver, Owl City, and Benjamin Francis Leftwich.

"Jesus Christ 2005 God Bless America" deals with themes of heartbreak, faith, sexuality, love, vulnerability, defeat and fragility. It is sung from the perspective of two closeted religious individuals struggling with an internal conflict between religion, sexual orientation, and personal identity. Lyrically, it revolves around Christianity's suppression of queer identities. The song opens with gentle, strumming guitars and muted horns as Healy discusses his love for Jesus, his mortality, and his existence. Healy tries convincing himself of his devotion to the Church, despite feeling unaccepted, singing: "I'm in love with Jesus Christ / He's so nice / I'm in love I'll say it twice / I'm in love (love)". Lines such as "I'm in love with a boy I know / But that's a feeling I can never show" describe the need to hide his sexuality. Bridgers, who is openly bisexual, performs the third verse and reveals her attraction to a female neighbour, describing the shame of a love interest that feels forbidden: "I'm in love with the girl next door / Her name's Claire / Nice when she comes 'round to call / Then masturbate the second she's not there". Healy and Bridgers perform the final chorus together, sarcastically thanking Jesus for saving them: "Fortunately, I believe, lucky me / I'm searching for planes in the sea, and that's irony / Soil just needs water to be, and a seed / So if we turn into a tree, can I be the leaves?"

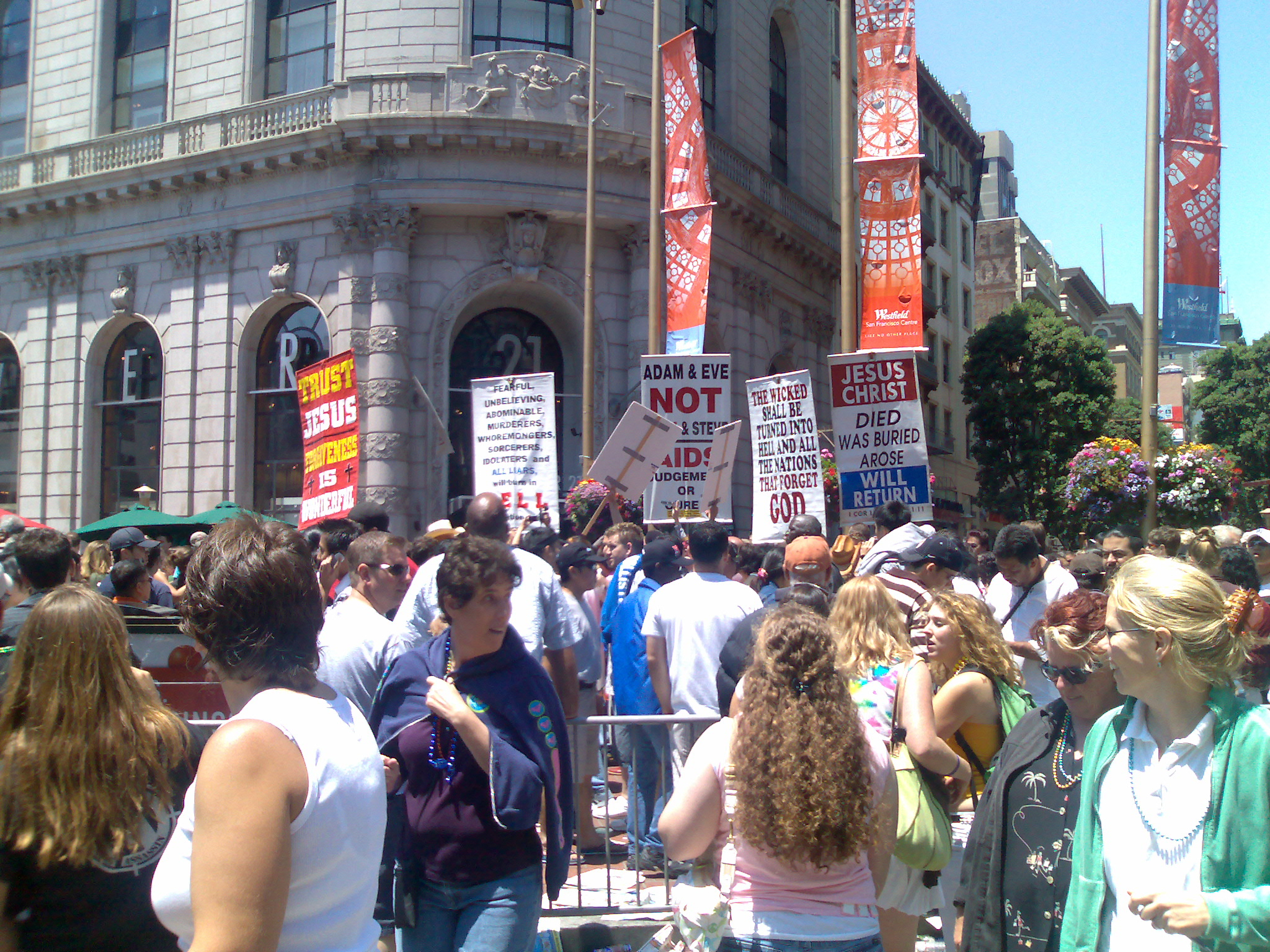
Some reviewers drew parallels between the song's title and widespread LGBT rights opposition in the United States during 2005.

Dan Stubbs of NME found the overall theme of "Jesus Christ 2005 God Bless America" to be a "search for a higher power, a conflict with a non-binary identity and a desire to be a small part of a bigger thing." Patricia Kolbe of Barricade said the track addressed the disharmony between faith, sexuality, and identity. Hunt opined that "Jesus Christ 2005 God Bless America" represented "an existential realization that societal desires will forever be at odds with religion", while Consequence of Sound writer Ben Kaye felt it explored the dissonance between faith and love. Genius writer Kevin Loo described it as an "exploration of what it would be like to be trapped in faith while suppressing your sexuality." Loo viewed the song as an expression of the pain and confusion experienced by religious devotees who felt ostracized because of their sexual orientation. Gem Stokes wrote for Euphoria that the track was about the conflict between sexuality and the propagation of religion, with Healy attempting to empathize with religious believers despite being an atheist himself. This opinion was shared by Gigwise's Dillon Eastoe, who saw it as envying the faith of religious followers and the freedom it affords them. Regarding the song's title, both Loo and Kolbe interpreted it as a reference to the widespread homophobia, LGBT rights opposition, and anti-LGBT policies prevalent throughout the United States in 2005.

== Reception ==
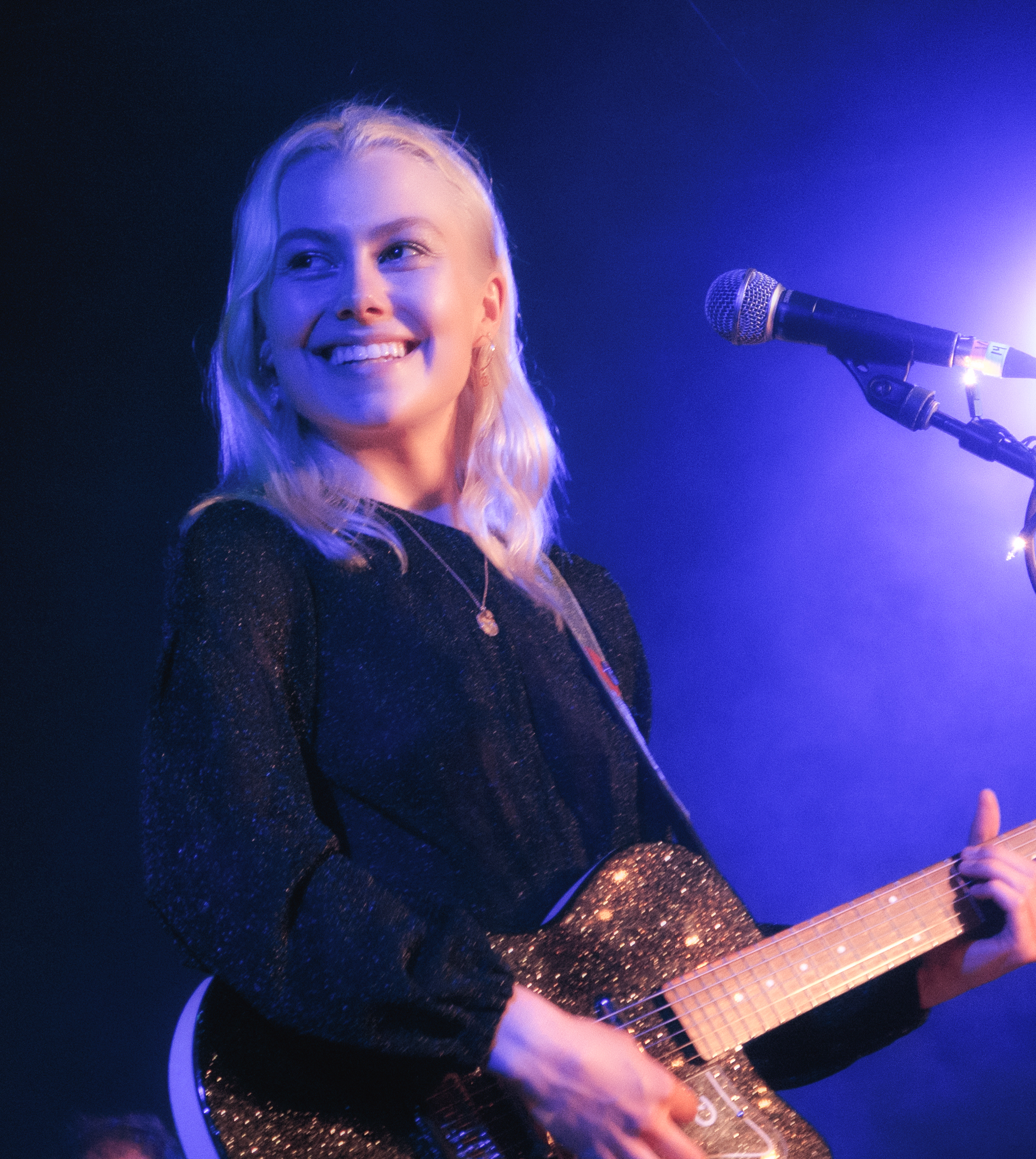
The inclusion of Bridgers was deemed a highlight by several critics.

Following the release of "Jesus Christ 2005 God Bless America", several contemporary music critics praised the emotionally-charged lyrics. Mitch Mosk of Atwood Magazine called it an "achingly poignant" number, noting the confessional nature of the lyrics were similar in character to Bruce Springsteen and Elliott Smith. Consequence of Sound writer Ben Kaye praised the lyrical vulnerability of "Jesus Christ 2005 God Bless America", calling it "a crushing acoustic number". Ali Shutler of NME declared it "[the 1975's] most heartfelt, emotional turn yet". He compared the song's stark and personal sound to Bruce Springsteen's "Nebraska" (1982), calling it "haunting" and beautiful, and saying the track was "made for the comforting embrace of headphones". Martyn Young of Dork referred to the single as "one of [the band's] most important and deeply beautiful moments". In his review of Notes on a Conditional Form, Andrew Sacher of BrooklynVegan highlighted Healy's emotional openness, saying: "[his] words can shake you to your core". Sophia Andrade of The Harvard Crimson said the song's lyrics were "characteristically cutting and clever with an added vulnerability that sets the song apart from the poppier numbers that appear to make up the majority of the upcoming album." Callie Ahlgrim of Insider said the personal-sounding nature of "Jesus Christ 2005 God Bless America" reminded her of similar gentle and tender qualities displayed in "Nana" (2016) and "Be My Mistake" (2018).

Several reviewers highlighted the stripped-down soundscape of "Jesus Christ 2005 God Bless America". Reviewing the track for Soundigest, Kiku Gross said: "Typically, 'stripped-back' or 'simple' is not how The 1975 are ever described. Lush, opulent, self-indulgent, even, but never minimalist or simple." She opined that the band's experimentation created one of their most personal and authentic songs, providing an honest look into Healy's mind. In her review of "Jesus Christ 2005 God Bless America" for The Diamondback, Rachel Hunt praised the "heart-wrenching production" and Healy's vocal performance, saying it "brings listeners quietly to their knees". Patricia Kolbe of Barricade called "Jesus Christ 2005 God Bless America" her favourite song on Notes on a Conditional Form, writing it was the "stripped, vulnerable track we need to help us through our inner struggles and the comforting embrace that reminds us that it will be okay." Paste reviewer Alex Jones wrote that the song sounded "particularly stripped" among the maximalist pop and pop-punk of previous Notes on a Conditional Form singles. Daniel Kohn of Spin said the song further expanded the group into new sonic territory, a sentiment shared by Sacher, who used "Jesus Christ 2005 God Bless America" as an example of the band successfully incorporating guitar-oriented sub-genres into their repertoire. In his review of Notes on a Conditional Form, Dan Stubbs of NME said the song was pleasantly unexpected. Trey Alston of MTV News said the song's "delicate beauty will put a smile on your face".

The inclusion of Bridgers in "Jesus Christ 2005 God Bless America" was also well received by several critics. Ahlgrim opined that the singer provided "Jesus Christ 2005 God Bless America" with added gravity and authenticity, praising the pair's harmonies and calling Bridgers "extremely worthy of the first-ever lyrical feature on a 1975 album". This opinion was echoed by Hunt, who felt Bridgers gave the song an added layer of dimension and melancholy. Caroline Edwards of Riot called the harmonizing of Healy and Bridgers' vocals "chilling" and "magical", comparing it to "a hearty bowl of soup: perfectly comforting and good for the soul." Similarly, Young said the inclusion of Bridgers gave the track additional resonance and emotional depth, praising her "rich and yearning vocals" for providing a "lovely" contrast to Healy's hushed tones. Shahlin Graves of Coup De Main praised the inclusion of "the supremely talented" Bridgers and classified "Jesus Christ 2005 God Bless America" as a "must-listen". Jones regarded Bridgers' verse as the song's highlight, stating the "track really shines once [her] aching voice is introduced". Courtney Larroca of Insider said the vocals of Healy and Bridgers "[intertwined] beautifully", and Kolbe found that Bridgers' "delicate vocals" harmonized with Healy's hushed tones and complimented one another "wonderfully". "Jesus Christ 2005 God Bless America" peaked at number 88 on the UK Singles Chart, number 83 in Ireland, number 38 on the US Billboard Hot Rock & Alternative Songs chart and number 11 on the New Zealand Hot Singles chart.

== Promotion and music video ==
In February 2020, Healy headlined a solo acoustic show in Australia to raise money for the 2020 Australian bush fires, where he performed "Jesus Christ 2005 God Bless America". To promote Notes on a Conditional Form, The 1975 and Ben Ditto commissioned 15 artists to create art videos for 15 songs on the album, focusing on themes of technology, hope, love, anxiety and violence. The artists used various mediums to create their films including 3D modelling, artificial intelligence, generative animation, motion-capture animation, performance and robotics. The videos were scheduled to be released over a three-month period, culminating in a free online exhibition entitled Artists Respond to NOACF. Spanish dancer and choreographer Candela Capitán was commissioned to create an art film for "Jesus Christ 2005 God Bless America". Upon release, the video was mired in controversy due to its explicit nature and quickly removed from Facebook and Instagram. Speaking on the controversy, Capitán said: "Their young audience understood the song as a praise to God and my video as a consecration to pornography [...] I felt really disappointed. It wasn't about the band liking my work, it was about how money and power always win when there's a loss of followers and views at stake." The video was later released by Capitán in October 2020, omitting the audio from "Jesus Christ 2005 God Bless America".

== Credits and personnel ==
Credits adapted from Notes on a Conditional Form album liner notes.

- Matthew Healy – composer, producer, guitar, vocals
- George Daniel – composer, producer, keyboards, synthesiser, programming
- Adam Hann – composer
- Ross MacDonald – composer, double bass
- Phoebe Bridgers – additional vocals
- Ben Lester – pedal steel
- Rashawn Ross – trumpet
- John Waugh – saxophone
- Jonathan Gilmore – recording engineer
- Robin Schmidt – mastering engineer
- Mike Crossey – mixer

== Charts ==
Chart (2020)	Peak position
Ireland (IRMA)	83
New Zealand Hot Singles (RMNZ)	11
UK Singles (Official Charts)	88
US Hot Rock & Alternative Songs (Billboard)	38

== See also ==
- The 1975 discography
- List of songs by Matty Healy
