= Nina Marker =

Danish fashion model (born 1997)

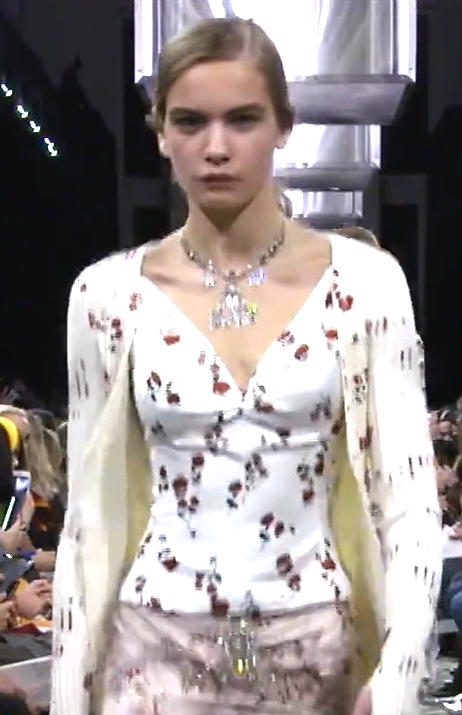
- Marker walks at the Paco Rabanne Fall Winter 2019–20 show
- Born: Nina Cornelia Marker; 10 December 1997 (age 28); Copenhagen, Denmark
- Occupation: Model
- Partner: Anton Thiemke
- Modeling information
- Height: 1.74 m (5 ft 8 1/2 in)
- Hair color: Brown
- Eye color: Green
- Agency: The Society Management (New York City); Model Management (Hamburg); Munich Models (Munich); Elite Model Management (worldwide)

Nina Cornelia Marker (born 1997) is a Danish fashion model who speaks frequently on neurodevelopmental disorders and mental health issues. A top-ranked runway model who has worked internationally with luxury brands such as Chanel and Versace, she is known within the industry for her "refreshingly unpretentious approach" to her work and more broadly in her Instagram profile.

== Early life ==
Marker was born in Copenhagen, Denmark. She struggled in school and was diagnosed with Asperger syndrome, a form of autism, after seeking help for depression when she was 15 years old.

== Career ==
Marker was scouted while riding the subway on the way to McDonald's. In 2014, she won the Copenhagen round of the Elite Model Look competition. Her major break came as a runway model for Anthony Vaccarello's collection for Saint Laurent. She has appeared on catwalks at the New York, London, Paris, and Milan fashion weeks, and has modeled for brands such as Chanel, Dolce & Gabbana, Fendi, Stella McCartney, and Versace.

In September 2017, as one of the top models at Milan Fashion Week, she gained international attention when she posted a photograph of herself on Instagram wearing a t-shirt that said, "Bee Kind, I Have Autism". In the message to her followers, she wrote, "It's possible for us to be successful and have a good time...Stay safe and protect your mind." The post quickly went viral on social media, particularly among family and friends of children with Aspergers and other neurodevelopmental disorders, and caused a stir in the fashion world.

Marker was subsequently featured in the American edition of Vogue magazine, and has since spoken regularly about mental health issues, sharing her frustration in school, which she says was ill-equipped to deal with her condition. In 2021, she told Vogue Business that she constantly needs to remind people how her neurodivergence affects her on set, where there are many stimuli that could lead to sensory overload, because of misconceptions that her "normal" appearance means she is neurotypical. She works with her agents at The Society and Elite to ensure that she has breaks between jobs to allow her to decompress, and that her travel plans are arranged to minimize stress and avoid possible triggers. She practices yoga to improve her ability to cope with work pressures.

Vogue listed Marker as a breakout model for the Spring 2018 season, describing her as "delivering confidence and attitude aplenty", and said that "by using her social media platforms to raise awareness about autism in the midst of everything, Marker made her impact on and off the runway".

As of 2022, Marker is ranked on the Models.com Money List of models with commercial clients.
