= 1990s in film =

The decade of the 1990s in film involved many significant developments in the industry of cinema. Numerous feature-length movies were specifically filmed and/or edited to be displayed not only on theater screens but also the smaller TV screens, like showing more close-ups and less wide shots during dialogue scenes. Moreover, the home video market grew into being a major factor on the total revenue of a theatrical film, often doubling the amount. An example of both cases is Batman: Mask of the Phantasm, which was initially intended as a direct-to-video release.

== Trends ==
- These particular ten years are notable for milestone advancements in CGI technology, seen in such motion pictures as Terminator 2: Judgment Day, Jurassic Park, and Forrest Gump courtesy of Industrial Light & Magic. 1995's Toy Story by Pixar became the first feature film to be completely computer-animated, heralding the use of 3D graphics as a tool for filmmakers to achieve new visuals on-screen.
- Stemming from the tail end of the 1980s, the mainstream successes of low-budget auteurs like Quentin Tarantino, Robert Rodriguez, Kevin Smith, Paul Thomas Anderson, Gus Van Sant, Richard Linklater, Steven Soderbergh, and the Coen brothers; alongside the increased prominence of independent and mini-major movie studios such as New Line Cinema, Miramax Films, and Gramercy Pictures; gave rise to a boom period of highly profitable indie films that include Pulp Fiction, Fargo, Boogie Nights, Good Will Hunting, The Big Lebowski, and The Blair Witch Project.
- The Disney Renaissance began in late 1989 with The Little Mermaid, reached peak popularity with The Lion King in 1994, and ended in 1999 with Tarzan. During its influential run, the mass appeal of animated musicals got exceptionally rejuvenated (as opposed to The Rescuers Down Under in 1990, which contains no original songs and has been generally deemed a commercial disappointment even compared to its 1977 predecessor), resulting in supposed emulations from similar production companies. However, merely three of said attempts proved to be lucrative, namely The Nightmare Before Christmas by Skellington, Anastasia by Fox, and The Prince of Egypt by DreamWorks. Around six months prior to the decade's conclusion, Comedy Central's South Park: Bigger, Longer & Uncut prospered in part through parodying the conventions of this trend.
- The influence of MTV continued as an influx of stylish music video directors, mostly from Propaganda Films, was given opportunities to helm significant titles. David Fincher, Alex Proyas, Michael Bay, Spike Jonze, Dominic Sena, Simon West, Gore Verbinski, Antoine Fuqua, and others contributed to the silver screen's aesthetics with The Crow, Bad Boys, Seven, Dark City, Being John Malkovich, Fight Club, and so on.
- 1988's Die Hard and the subsequent Die Hard 2 established what became a common plot scenario for many 1990s action films, which is the matchup of an everyman hero against a colorful villain who is threatening the lives of innocents in an isolated setting, though with certain variations. Features of this kind, and the sequels that followed some of them, are often referred to as "Die Hard on a _____": Under Siege (battleship), Cliffhanger (mountain), Speed (bus), The Rock (prison island), Con Air (prison plane), Air Force One (presidential plane), and so forth.
- A resurgence of disaster films dominated the box office with blockbusters such as Twister, Independence Day, Titanic, and Armageddon.
- Several leading figures of 1980s to mid-1990s Hong Kong action cinema migrated to Hollywood with varying success: Jackie Chan, Jet Li, Chow Yun-fat, Michelle Yeoh, John Woo, Yuen Woo-ping, Tsui Hark, Ringo Lam, etc. Updating martial arts and gunfight choreography in American motion pictures with such releases as Broken Arrow, Face/Off, Tomorrow Never Dies, Lethal Weapon 4, Rush Hour, and The Matrix. Three Western world directorial debuts of established Eastern filmmakers were for Jean-Claude Van Damme star vehicles, though these collaborations only performed moderately en masse at the global market.
- Wes Craven's Scream revitalized the declining interest in slasher films through satirizing the subgenre with characters that are well-versed in its clichés. Leading to studios capitalizing especially on the high school to college age demographic with the likes of I Know What You Did Last Summer, Scream 2, Urban Legend, and I Still Know What You Did Last Summer. The three biggest hits among all these movies were written or adapted by Kevin Williamson, who also co-wrote the sci-fi horror The Faculty, which targeted the same audience as well.

== Highest-grossing films ==
List of worldwide highest-grossing films
Rank	Title	Studios	Worldwide gross	Year	Ref.
1	Titanic	Paramount Pictures/20th Century Fox	$1,843,201,268	1997	
2	Star Wars: Episode I – The Phantom Menace	20th Century Fox	$924,317,558	1999	
3	Jurassic Park	Universal Pictures	$914,691,118	1993	
4	Independence Day	20th Century Fox	$817,400,891	1996	
5	The Lion King	Walt Disney Studios	$763,455,561	1994	
6	Forrest Gump	Paramount Pictures	$677,387,716	1994	
7	The Sixth Sense	Walt Disney Studios	$672,806,292	1999	
8	The Lost World: Jurassic Park	Universal Pictures	$618,638,999	1997	
9	Men in Black	Sony Pictures/Columbia Pictures	$589,390,539	1997	
10	Armageddon	Walt Disney Studios	$553,709,788	1998	
11	Terminator 2: Judgment Day	TriStar Pictures	$519,843,345	1991	
12	Ghost	Paramount Pictures	$505,702,588	1990	
13	Aladdin	Walt Disney Studios	$504,050,219	1992	
14	Twister	Warner Bros./Universal Pictures	$494,471,524	1996	
15	Toy Story 2	Walt Disney Studios	$485,015,179	1999	
16	Saving Private Ryan	Paramount Pictures/DreamWorks Pictures	$481,840,909	1998	
17	Home Alone	20th Century Fox	$476,684,675	1990	
18	The Matrix	Warner Bros.	$463,517,383	1999	
19	Pretty Woman	Walt Disney Studios	$463,406,268	1990	
20	Mission: Impossible	Paramount Pictures	$457,696,359	1996	
21	Tarzan	Walt Disney Studios	$448,191,819	1999	
22	Mrs. Doubtfire	20th Century Fox	$441,286,195	1993	
23	Dances with Wolves	Orion Pictures	$424,208,848	1990	
24	The Mummy	Universal Pictures	$415,933,406	1999	
25	The Bodyguard	Warner Bros.	$411,006,740	1992	
26	Robin Hood: Prince of Thieves	Warner Bros.	$390,493,908	1991	
27	Godzilla	TriStar Pictures	$379,014,294	1998	
28	True Lies	20th Century Fox	$378,882,411	1994	
29	Toy Story	Walt Disney Studios	$373,554,033	1995	
30	There's Something About Mary	20th Century Fox	$369,884,651	1998	
31	The Fugitive	Warner Bros.	$368,875,760	1993	
32	Die Hard with a Vengeance	20th Century Fox/Cinergi Pictures	$366,101,666	1995	
33	Notting Hill	Universal Pictures	$363,889,678	1999	
34	A Bug's Life	Walt Disney Studios	$363,398,565	1998	
35	The World Is Not Enough	Metro-Goldwyn-Mayer Pictures	$361,832,400	1999	
36	Home Alone 2: Lost in New York	20th Century Fox	$358,994,850	1992	
37	American Beauty	DreamWorks Pictures	$356,296,601	1999	
38	Apollo 13	Universal Pictures/Imagine Entertainment	$355,237,933	1995	
39	Basic Instinct	TriStar Pictures	$352,927,224	1992	
40	GoldenEye	MGM/United Artists	$352,194,034	1995	
41	The Mask	New Line Cinema	$351,583,407	1994	
42	Speed	20th Century Fox	$350,448,145	1994	
43	Deep Impact	Paramount Pictures/DreamWorks Pictures	$349,464,664	1998	
44	Beauty and the Beast	Walt Disney Studios	$346,317,207	1991	
45	Pocahontas	Walt Disney Studios	$346,079,773	1995	
46	The Flintstones	Universal Pictures	$341,631,208	1994	
47	Batman Forever	Warner Bros.	$336,529,144	1995	
48	The Rock	Walt Disney Studios	$335,062,621	1996	
49	Tomorrow Never Dies	MGM/United Artists	$333,011,068	1997	
50	Seven	New Line Cinema	$327,311,859	1995	

== Accolades ==
The following films received the most acclaim at the Academy Awards during the 1990s.

Year	Ceremony	Most nominations	Most awards	Best Picture
1990	63rd	Dances with Wolves (12)	Dances with Wolves (7)	Dances with Wolves
1991	64th	Bugsy (10)	The Silence of the Lambs (5)	The Silence of the Lambs
1992	65th	Howards End and Unforgiven (9)	Unforgiven (4)	Unforgiven
1993	66th	Schindler's List (12)	Schindler's List (7)	Schindler's List
1994	67th	Forrest Gump (13)	Forrest Gump (6)	Forrest Gump
1995	68th	Braveheart (10)	Braveheart (5)	Braveheart
1996	69th	The English Patient (12)	The English Patient (9)	The English Patient
1997	70th	Titanic (14)	Titanic (11)	Titanic
1998	71st	Shakespeare in Love (13)	Shakespeare in Love (7)	Shakespeare in Love
1999	72nd	American Beauty (8)	American Beauty (5)	American Beauty

== List of films ==
- 1990 in film
- 1991 in film
- 1992 in film
- 1993 in film
- 1994 in film
- 1995 in film
- 1996 in film
- 1997 in film
- 1998 in film
- 1999 in film

== See also ==
- Film, History of film, lists of films
- Popular culture: 1990s in music, 1990s in television
