= Evan Stephens Hall =

American singer-songwriter and musician (born 1989)

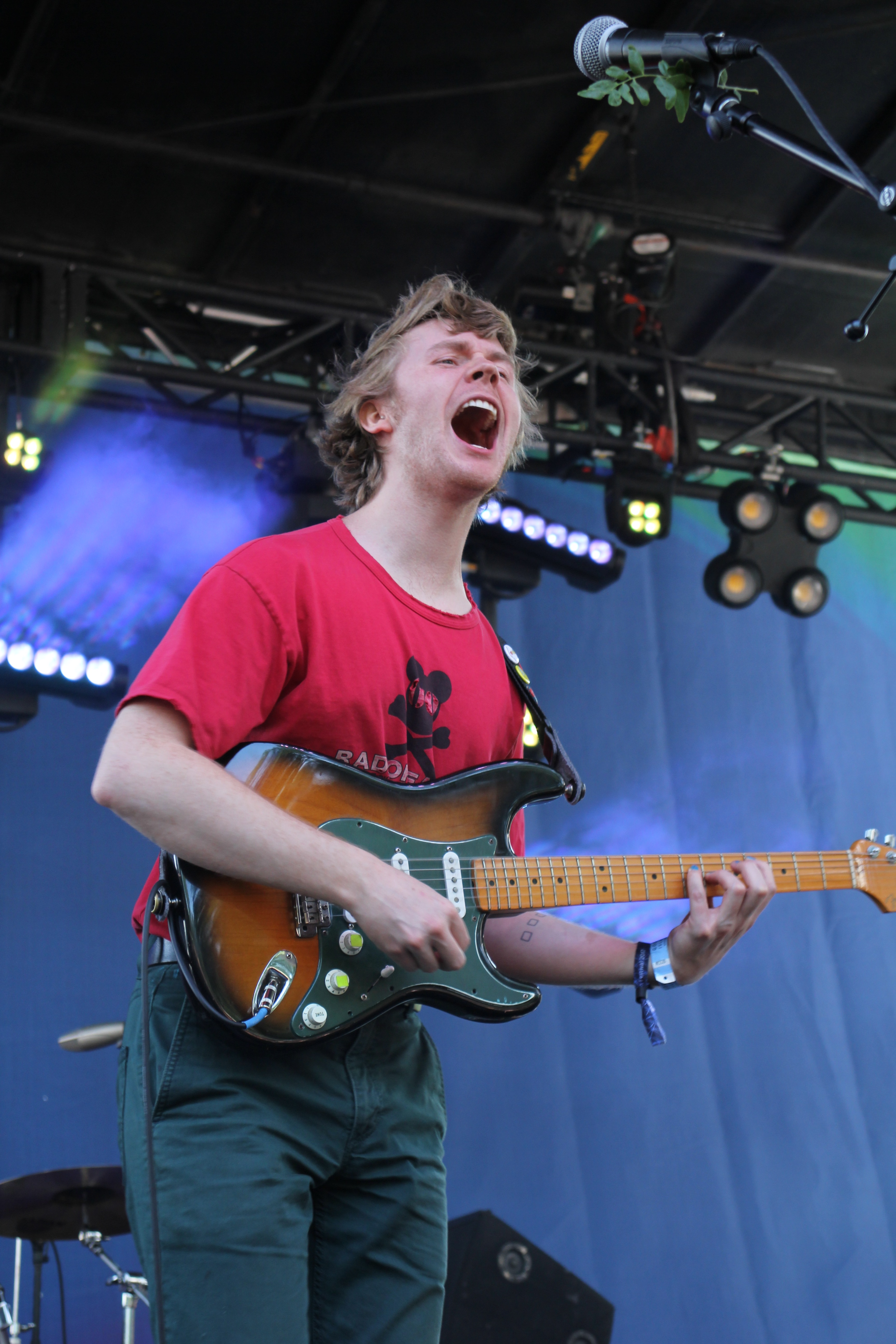
- Hall performing with Pinegrove in 2017
- Born: May 6, 1989 (age 37); New York City, U.S.
- Education: Kenyon College (BA)
- Occupations: Singer; songwriter; musician
- Parents: Doug Hall; Tracy Stephens
- Musical career
- Genres: Alt-country; emo; indie rock
- Instruments: Vocals; guitar; bass guitar; drums
- Years active: 2010–present
- Labels: Run for Cover; Rough Trade

Evan Stephens Hall (born May 6, 1989) is an American singer-songwriter and musician. Hall is best known as the lead singer & guitarist of indie rock band Pinegrove. Born in New York City, Hall grew up the son of a musician father, and took instrument lessons locally. During his time at Ohio's Kenyon College, Hall co-founded Pinegrove with drummer and childhood friend Zack Levine.

Pinegrove rose to fame in the mid-2010s with its breakthrough album, Cardinal (2016), which attracted broad critical acclaim. The band has released five studio albums so far; the most recent being 11:11, which was released in January 2022.

== Early life ==
Hall was born on May 6, 1989, in New York City, to Tracey Stephens and Doug Hall. In June 1992, the family moved to Montclair, New Jersey. Hall's mother briefly operated a women's shelter and was involved in social work, but now works as an interior designer. Hall's father works in commercial music; he is best known for composing the jingle for financial company J.G. Wentworth. Hall's interests growing up included skateboarding—he aspired to be a professional skateboarder as an adult, but suffered a concussion in his teens that sidelined his interest. Hall spent several years camping at Geneva Glen, a co-educational summer camp located in Indian Hills, Colorado; he was later hired as a counselor in the years before founding Pinegrove.

Hall was friends with Pinegrove drummer Zack Levine growing up, and the two attended the local public schools together through Montclair High School. Both boys’ fathers are in a cover band together—Julie's Party, a roots rock outfit covering acts like Bonnie Raitt and Little Feat. Hall grew up taking lessons at Montclair Music Studio, first learning the drums, then bass, and lastly the guitar. He and Levine began playing music together at seven years old, forming their first band, the Pug Fuglies, in the sixth grade. The following year, the duo began playing together in Dogwater, a grunge band, which they focused on throughout high school. During that time, the duo played many shows at Montclair's Serendipity Cafe and expressed the positive impact playing their music in a welcoming and encouraging space had on them.

After graduating from high school in 2007, Hall attended Kenyon College in Gambier, Ohio, from which he graduated in 2011, majoring in creative writing with an emphasis in poetry. During his tenure there, he also developed a love of semiotics and modernist literature. He worked at a recycling plant through college, which became the namesake of the Pinegrove song "Recycling".

== Music career ==
=== Pinegrove ===
While at Kenyon College, Hall co-founded Pinegrove with Levine. The group built a grassroots following in the early 2010s with extended plays and do-it-yourself house concerts. They issued their debut album, Meridian, in 2012 via online music platform Bandcamp. Viewing a move necessary to gain notice, the band relocated to Brooklyn, New York. Hall had a difficult experience in New York; in an interview, he remarked that "everything in my life was falling apart during that period." He found the frenetic nature of the city unenjoyable and worked excessively to make ends meet. After nine months, Hall returned to his parents' home. For the next several years, he lived at home in Montclair, working part-time at a bookstore and focusing on songwriting.

He distilled this productive writing period into Cardinal, Pinegrove's 2016 breakthrough album. During this era, the band signed to Run for Cover Records, an independent record label from Boston known for associating with fourth-wave emo acts. Cardinal was widely successful, acclaimed by critics for its tone and sincerity. Pinegrove quickly developed a large following of fans and played over 200 shows that year. The band headlined several nationwide tours, consistently selling out mid-sized venues. The band "seemed poised to enlarge its audience significantly" at this moment. In November 2017, Hall posted a lengthy statement to the band's Facebook regarding an accusation of "sexual coercion" against him. Further reports revealed that Hall had a brief relationship with a member of the band's touring team who accused him of using "verbal and contextual pressure" sexually. Philadelphia-based mental health nonprofit Punk Talks was involved in facilitating Hall's statement, having done so "without [the accuser's] knowledge, support or permission". The situation—resolved via a private mediator between the two—resulted in Pinegrove taking a year-long hiatus at the accuser's request.

Skylight—the band's third full-length—saw release in 2018, and received a muted but positive reaction from fans. The band continued to tour, selling out a nationwide tour between February and March 2019. Later that year, the band announced they had signed to British indie label Rough Trade for their next effort, 2020's Marigold.

In April 2023, Pinegrove announced that Zack Levine would depart the band, and that the remaining members would continue "on a more casual basis". Hall further noted, "I might do solo performances here and there. But we have no plans to perform as a band right now. We’re gonna chill a bit, take some time to finish up odds and ends,” marking the beginning of an indefinite hiatus.

=== Solo career ===
In 2017, Hall contributed a solo cover of Green Day's "Burnout" to Earth Day: A Tribute to Green Day, a tribute album; all proceeds went to the Hurricane Maria Community Relief & Recovery Fund.

== Musical style and songwriting ==
Hall's influences on his songwriting are split between music and literature, owing to his tenure at Kenyon studying English. On the sonic side, Hall has cited Stephen Steinbrink, Ben Lerner, Greta Kline, and Phil Elverum as inspirations. Hall's earliest musical influences included alternative rock mainstays such as Radiohead, Green Day, and Nirvana. In terms of literature, he has also noted novelists James Joyce, William Faulkner, Virginia Woolf, and David Foster Wallace, as influences on his work, as well as the short story author George Saunders. Hall has specifically cited Woolf's The Waves and Wallace's Infinite Jest as inspirations, commenting that "they made me feel ambitious, in that they have such a specific worldview, and made me question what I have to offer."

Hall has referred to Pinegrove as "language-arts rock." As a songwriter, Hall has emphasized simplicity and immediacy, viewing complexity as a defense mechanism in art. To this end, Hall has depicted himself as a "student of pop music," praising famed hitmaker Max Martin as "arguably the best songwriter of our time." He aims for a conversational tone in his lyricism, believing it expresses meaning more directly. His lyrics frequently touch on themes of communication, loneliness, and more general concepts such as color and geometry.

== Discography ==
With Pinegrove

- Meridian (2012)
- Everything So Far (2015)
- Cardinal (2016)
- Skylight (2018)
- Marigold (2020)
- 11:11 (2022)

As Evan Stephens Hall

- Earth Day: A Tribute to Green Day (2017) (song: "Burnout")

With Tawny Peaks

- In Silver River (2014)
